= Mr. Unbelievable =

- Theatrical release poster
- Unbelievable先生
- Directed by: Ong Kuo Sin
- Written by: Ong Kuo Sin
- Produced by: Melvin Ang; Lim Teck; Ong Kuo Sin; Toong Soo Wei; Sock Ling
- Starring: Chen Tianwen; Liu Lingling; Marcus Chin; Roy Li; Jaime Teo; Tosh Zhang
- Edited by: Heng
- Music by: Gary Leo
- Production companies: mm2 Entertainment; Clover Films; Byleft Productions; NB Productions
- Distributed by: mm2 Entertainment; Clover Films; Shaw Organisation
- Release date: 3 December 2015
- Running time: 94 minutes
- Country: Singapore
- Languages: Mandarin; Hokkien; English
- Budget: S$1 million
- Box office: S$560,000

Mr. Unbelievable (Chinese: Unbelievable先生; pinyin: Unbelievable xiānshēng) is a 2015 Singaporean musical comedy film directed by Ong Kuo Sin, and starring Chen Tianwen as the titular protagonist. The film commemorates Singapore's 50th birthday or SG50, and was based on the viral song "Unbelievable" and was released in cinemas in Singapore on 3 December 2015, and in Malaysia on 14 January 2016. It also marks the third on-screen reunion of Chen Tianwen, Liu Lingling, Roy Li and Hayley Woo after their previous collaborations in the Singaporean long drama series 118 and 118 II, where both of the installments theme songs were sung by popular local celebrity and film director Jack Neo. Secondly, it also marks another on-screen reunion of Liu Lingling and Zhang Xinxiang after their previous collaboration in the local drama known as Portrait of Home and 118. Thirdly, it also marks another on-screen reunion of Liu Lingling and Jaime Teo after their previous collaboration in I Not Stupid Too TV Series, also directed by Jack Neo. Moreover, it also marks another on-screen reunion of Chen Tianwen, Tosh Zhang and Zhang Xinxiang after their previous collaborations in the Lion dance movies The Lion Men and The Lion Men: Ultimate Showdown, another movie franchise also directed by Jack Neo once again. Furthermore, it also marks another on-screen reunion of Chen Tianwen and Tosh Zhang after their previous collaborations in the Ah Boys to Men film series either, including Ah Boys to Men, Ah Boys to Men 2 and Ah Boys to Men 3: Frogmen, also directed by Jack Neo either. At the same time, it also marks another on-screen reunion of Chen Tianwen, Tosh Zhang, Hayley Woo and Gadrick Chin after their previous collaboration together in Jack Neo's Naval Diving Unit movie known as Ah Boys to Men 3: Frogmen. Also, Chen Tianwen and Gadrick Chin would later collaborate again as enemies in the movie known as Take 2, which was executive produced by Jack Neo once again either and directed by Ivan Ho. Furthermore, this film is also another combination of storylines in the 1960s and 1980s respectively from Jack Neo's kampong and HDB Flat movies known as Long Long Time Ago, Long Long Time Ago 2, The Diam Diam Era and The Diam Diam Era Two.

== Plot ==
Eric Kwek Hock Seng, a getai performer and taxi driver, is born on 9 August 1965, the day Singapore declared its independence, and the date where Singaporeans would celebrate National Day together, and is abandoned as a baby in a basket with a flower and broccoli by his mother on 25 December 1965 during Christmas Day. He is then taken in by Master Lo Man to join his singing troupe known as Luo's Family Singing and Dancing Ensemble (罗氏歌舞团). In the year 1982, Lo Man trains Eric to perform in the getai business, and through the years, he becomes one who is a patriotic Singaporean, and is hugely supportive of national campaigns. When Lo Man's getai business becomes unable to keep up with the times, and also because of the Speak Mandarin Campaign, he decided to add English lyrics to Chinese and Hokkien songs, much to the dismay to Lo Man, his friends and disciples Ah FeFei and Ah Hua, and frequent getai-goers. At the same time, his poor command of the English language made it worse, resulting in certain phrases, such as "stunned like vegetable", sounding relatively wonky. However, his new disciple and forever-loyal fan, Lawrence, is extremely supportive of this decision, as he is encouraged by his mother to listen to Eric's songs. To show his strong will and persistence to fulfil his dreams, Eric is determined to go on an unbelievable musical journey, even at the age of 50 years old. With the help of Lawrence, Ah Fei, Ah Hua and girlfriend and later wife Man Li, Eric managed to become a sensation through his song "Unbelievable".

== Cast ==
- Chen Tianwen as Eric Kwek Hock Seng, a 50-year-old getai performer and taxi driver
  - Genghis Chan as his baby self
- Liu Lingling as Man Li, a beer promoter at a kopi tiam and Eric's love interest (Her name is a parody of Huang Qing Yuan's most popular song)
- Marcus Chin as Master Lo Man, master of the singing troupe and Eric's adoptive father (His name is a parody of Lo Mang)
- Roy Li as Ah Fei, Lo Man's disciple
- Jaime Teo as Ah Hua, Lo Man's daughter and disciple, and Eric's childhood lover
- Tosh Zhang as Lawrence, a part-time actor, Eric's disciple and forever-loyal fan
- Hayley Woo as Omega Cui, a singer and Eric's competitor
- Hong Huifang as a Samsui woman who is a fan of Eric and Master Lo Man's music
  - Ezann Lee as her younger self
- Zhang Wei as the getai show organiser/boss
- Zhang Xinxiang as Man Li's boss at the kopi tiam
- Jim Lim as a television director
- Daren Tan as television protagonist
- Silver Ang as competition host
- Gadrick Chin as Daniel Cui, Omega Cui's Father
- Chua Jin Sen (also known as Dr Jia Jia) as Kid at Kopi tiam whom is Eric's fan

== Production ==
The huge success of Chen's "Unbelievable" music video, which garnered 3.2 million views on Facebook and YouTube prompted director Ong Kuo Sin to come up with a feature film and provide a background story for it. The film was shot in 15 days starting from 14 September 2015.

To sing Hokkien songs in the film, Jaime Teo had to watch online videos to brush up on the dialect.

== Reception ==
Yip Wai Yee of The Straits Times gave the film 2 out of 5 stars, attributing it to Chen's portrayal of his teenage character "unconvincing", and that "to milk (the original music video) and drag it into a full-length feature film makes the nonsense go on for far too long".

Marcus Goh of Yahoo! Movies called it "intentionally cheesy and corny, which works well given the subject matter of the film and the different language mediums it spans". At the same time, "it definitely appeals to the older crowd, but there are elements for the younger audience".

Jocelyn Lee of The New Paper rated the film a 2 out of 5 stars, as it "is hindered by a thin plot, and relies on slapstick humour, making it utterly forgettable".

== Box office ==
The film collected $25,000 on its opening day, making it the biggest opener among Singaporean films, excluding Chinese New Year films.
