= Ah Boys to Men (film series) =

Singaporean film series

Ah Boys to Men 新兵正传
- Directed by: Jack Neo
- Written by: Jack Neo; Link Sng
- Produced by: Jack Neo; Melvin Ang; Lim Teck
- Edited by: Yim Mun Chong
- Music by: Tosh Zhang
- Production companies: J Team Productions; mm2 Entertainment; Clover Films
- Distributed by: Golden Village Pictures; Clover Films
- Release dates: 8 November 2012 (Ah Boys to Men); 1 February 2013 (Ah Boys to Men 2)
- Country: Singapore
- Languages: English; Mandarin; Hokkien; Malay; Tamil
- Budget: S$3 million

Ah Boys to Men is a Singaporean satirical military comedy film series written and directed by Jack Neo. Co-produced by Neo's J Team Productions and mm2 Entertainment, the project made history as Singapore's first theatrical "duology" (two-part film). Although developed and filmed as a single unified project, the production was split into two parts, after distributors advised keeping each feature around 100 minutes long to avoid increased expenditure and scheduling complications.

Sharing a budget of S$3 million, Ah Boys to Men and its sequel, Ah Boys to Men 2, became the most expensive films in Singaporean cinema history and marked Neo's first venture into the military genre. The production also made history as the first feature film permitted to shoot at the military-sensitive Pulau Tekong, home to Basic Military Training Centre. Furthermore, the film was released in the Dolby Atmos format, becoming the first Asian movie to showcase the technology.

== Production ==
=== Development ===
The project was conceived in 2012 with the support of The Singaporean Ministry of Defence (MINDEF), which initially wanted Jack Neo to adapt the 2010 educational documentary Every Singaporean Son about Basic Military Training into a feature to commemorate the 45th anniversary of National Service (NS).

Research took around two and a half months. After this research phase, Neo explained to MINDEF that the documentary footages would be difficult to adapt. He proposed crafting an entirely new feature film instead, noting that the last local feature on NS Ong Keng Sen's film Army Daze, which was adapted from Michael Chiang's adapted theatre play, was released in 1996. Neo pointed out that he aimed to create a more realistic depiction of NS in his film. Ever since his own time as a National Service recruit in the 1970s, when he was influenced by Taiwanese army films, Neo had wanted to direct a military-themed project but could not find the right opportunity.

Ah Boys to Men became Jack Neo's first military-themed film and, according to the director, "his most ambitious project". After MINDEF approved his proposal, Neo co-wrote the script with Link Sng. Neo, Lim Teck, and Leonard Lai served as producers, while Neo's wife, Irene Kng, served as executive producer. Co-produced by Neo's JTeam Productions and mm2 Entertainment, the film make history as Singapore's first "duology" (two parts film). The production team decided to split the film into two parts after distributors advised keeping each feature around 100 minutes long to avoid increased expenditure and scheduling complications. Both films shared a budget of S$3 million.

According to Neo, MINDEF did not interfere with the writing or script editing process, citing a scene where recruits smuggle bakkwa during basic training as an example. This creative liberty was possible because Neo did not receive direct funding from MINDEF. Instead, the production was funded under the Media Development Authority's Production Assistance grant, and by several investors and sponsors such Toast Box, Bee Cheng Hiang, and KPMG. However, the production received full support from MINDEF to shoot the film, gaining access to locations, vehicles, equipment, weapons, and on-site consultants.

=== Casting ===
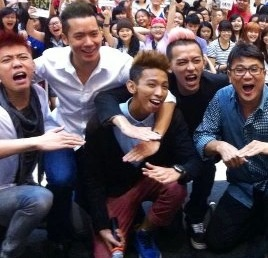
(Left to right) Actors Wang Weiliang, Joshua Tan, Ridhwan Azman, Tosh Zhang, and director Jack Neo at a roadshow in Chinatown

Casting for both films began in March 2012. JM Artiste Management (a collaboration between mm2 Entertainment and J Teams Productions) managed the casting. To cater to Neo's vision wanting fresh faces, casting team used social media for casting and contacted several bloggers to audition. Neo wanted to cast bloggers for their popularity and getai singers to create a new platform for them.

At least 500 auditioned for the lead roles. The auditions resulted in a lineup of rookie actors and digital personalities selected, such as Joshua Tan, Tosh Zhang, Maxi Lim, Noah Yap, Wang Weiliang, Ridhwan Azman, and Charlie Goh. For most of the lead cast, the film served as their debut feature.

Joshua Tan, originally from Melbourne, Australia, previously encountered a similar situation faced by his character in real life, when plans with his girlfriend were derailed by his mandatory National Service. Tan, an undergraduate at Monash University in Melbourne, Victoria, Australia, had to defer his studies to film Ah Boys to Men and Ah Boys to Men 2.

Maxi Lim had previously worked on local television series and short films. film Ah Boys to Men is his feature-length film debut. Wang Weiliang is getai singer by profession under the mentorship of Wang Lei. Wang auditioned for the role without prior preparation. Noah Yap had to defer his theatrical studies at the Nanyang Academy of Fine Arts to film Ah Boys to Men and Ah Boys to Men 2. It was reportedly Yap's "unconventional hairdo hair" that made Neo see potential in him. In the first Ah Boys to Men movie, he played a recruit. His nickname is a parody of Ip Man, a popular chinese martial artist portrayed by Donnie Yen. Ridhwan Azman was studying event management at the Institute of Technical Education Bishan Campus and had to quit his studies to film the two parts. Previously, he was a finalist in the Chinese singing competition Campus SuperStar.

Tosh Zhang portrayed 2SG Alex Ong, a stern platoon sergeant in charge of Ninja Company and Ken's platoon (known as Platoon 2, Section 2). Neo offered Zhang the role after viewing his vlogs, praising him as an eloquent, musically talented, and capable all-rounder. Initially planning to pursue film studies at Deakin University in Melbourne, Victoria, Australia, Zhang deferred his enrollment to film the project and subsequently turned down his place at the university. Following the release of Ah Boys to Men, Zhang won The New Paper's 2012 Breakout Star award, and he later received a nomination at the 2015 Kids' Choice Awards.

Cast members underwent a two-day Basic Military Training familiarization course to prepare for filming, which Tosh Zhang described as "as tough as what [they] really went through during national service".

Veteran actors Richard Low, Irene Ang, Yoo Ah Min, and Chen Tianwen were cast in supporting roles. Several prominent businessmen in Singapore, such as Kenny Yap, executive chairman of Qian Hu Corporation, and Douglas Foo, chairman of Sakae Holdings, were also invited to make cameo appearances as reservists in the war scene. Blogger Qiu Qiu made a special appearance in part one as Ken's girlfriend. Blogger mrbrown made a special appearance in part two, marking his first film role. Speaking at a press conference for the sequel, he described the shoot as three days of physical torture, noting that he ran more during filming than he had during his entire army life.

=== Filming and effects ===
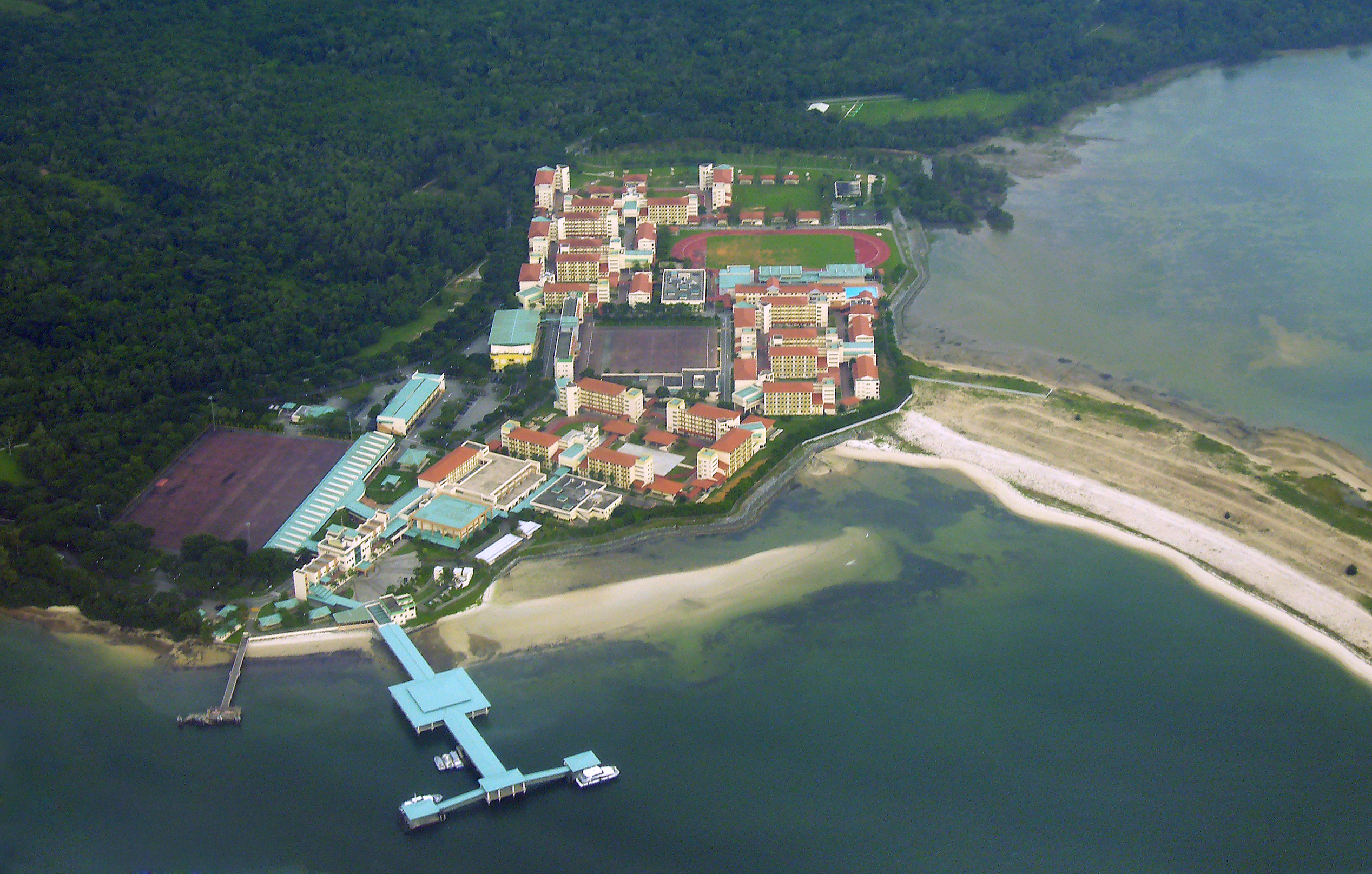
Basic Military Training Centre (BMTC) at Pulau Tekong (pictured in 2011)

Ah Boys to Men and its sequel were shot simultaneously during principal photography from July to September 2012, totaling seventy days. Thirty-five days of filming took place in Pulau Tekong, the site of the Basic Military Training Centre, making Ah Boys to Men the first film permitted to shoot there. The crew also filmed at Sembawang Air Base and Pasir Laba Camp.

Computer-generated imagery (CGI) was used to create the explosions for the opening scenes, where many landmarks in Singapore were destroyed. The visual effects were done by Vividthree Productions. Neo insisted on using real weapons and pyrotechnics for the shooting of the CGI-war sequences, despite the high cost, to provide the audience "new experience". Aerial shots required the use of Spidercams and cameras strapped onto remote control planes. Unmanned aerial vehicles were also used for filming, which Prime Minister Lee Hsien Loong acknowledged in his 2012 National Day Rally.

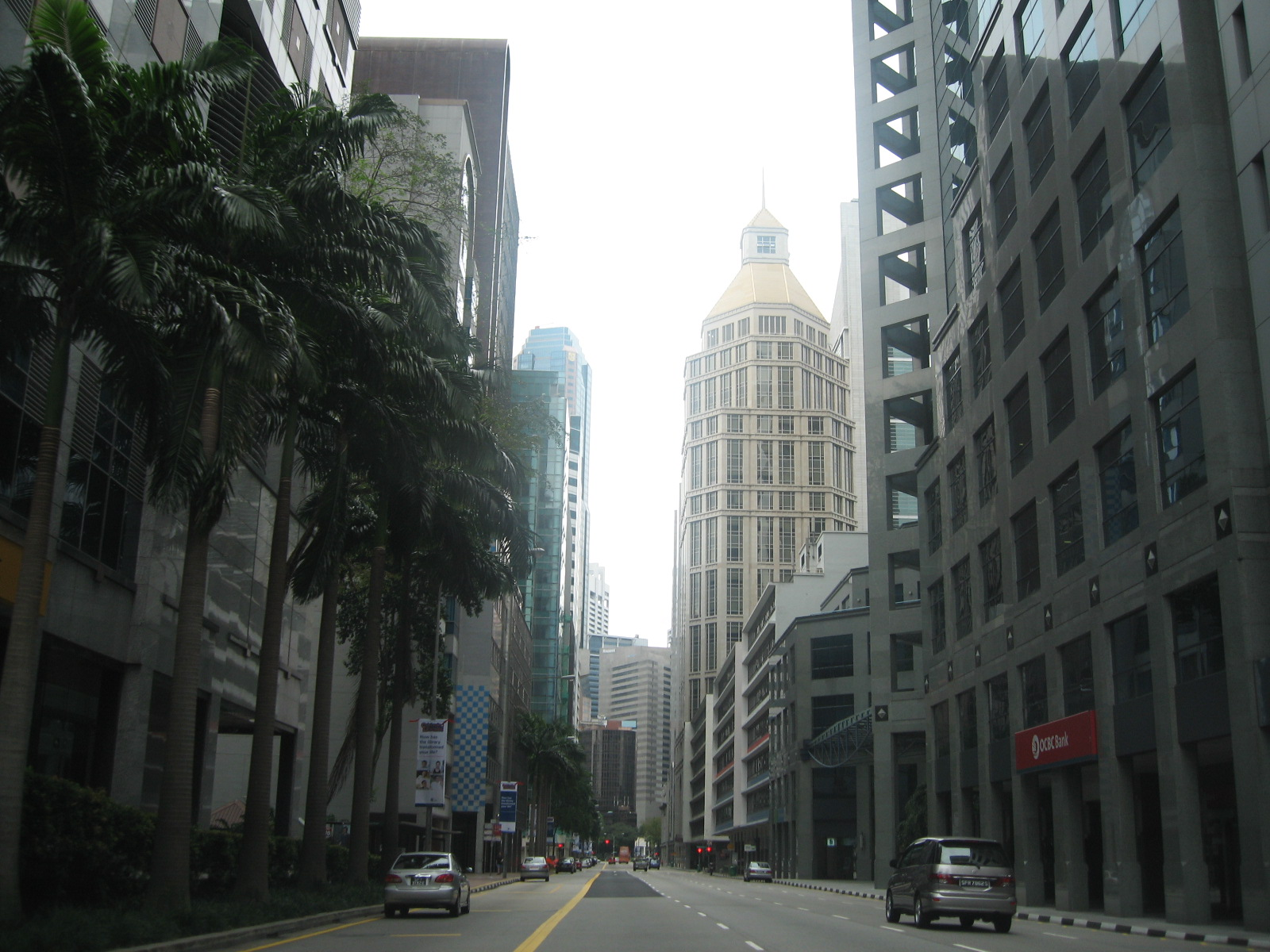
Robinson Road (pictured in 2006) was one of the film's practical locations

== Films ==
=== Ah Boys to Men (2012) ===
The film revolves around a group of army recruits in National Service in Singapore. Neo had wanted to shoot an army-themed film since his army days, but could not find a suitable chance to do so.

=== Ah Boys to Men 2 (2013) ===
The film focuses more on the unity of the protagonists, as well as tapping more on hot social topics like foreign talent in Singapore. It gave "a stronger story than its predecessor", and had a "more meaty" drama aspect, according to Neo. Other themes for the sequel include "sacrifice, love, family and patriotism".

== Characters ==
Character	Description	Actor	Appearances	
Character	Description	Actor	Part 1	Part 2
Main characters
REC Ken Chow	A spoilt teenager who dislikes the Army and is reluctant to enlist as he wants to study abroad with his girlfriend.	Joshua Tan	Main	Main
REC Aloysius Jin a.k.a. "Wayang King"	One of Ken's bunk mates and a nerd stereotype. Ambitious in nature, he aims to be among the best and get into Officer Cadet School (OCS) so as not to disappoint his mother; his "wayang" behaviour is also encouraged by his mother as well.	Maxi Lim	Main	Main
REC Bang "Lobang" Lee Onn	A street-smart and witty recruit, who according to Neo, "really nailed the portrayal of a slightly rebellious but very funny caricature".	Wang Weiliang	Main	Main
2SG Alex Ong	A stern platoon sergeant in charge of Ninja Company and Ken's platoon known as Platoon 2, Section 2.	Tosh Zhang	Main	Main
REC Man In Ping a.k.a. IP Man	One of Ken's bunk mate.	Noah Yap	Main	Main
REC Ismail Mohammed	One of Ken's bunk mates.	Ridhwan Azman	Main	Main
Recurring characters
REC Muthu Shanmugaratnam	One of Ken's bunk mates	Aizuddin Nasser	Recurring	Recurring
REC Tan Wei Ming	One of Ken's bunk mates	Charlie Goh	Recurring	Recurring
3SG Jed Heng	Section Commander of Ninja Company and Ken's platoon known as Platoon 2, Section 2	Luke Lee	Recurring	Recurring
CPT S L Tham	Officer Commanding of Ninja Company	Fish Chaar	Recurring	Recurring
Mr. Chow	Ken's father. He had a car accident at the end of part one this film because of a severe heart attack and stroke.	Richard Low	Recurring	Recurring
Mary Chow	Ken's mother. Pampers Ken and finds all methods to defer him from National Service.	Irene Ang	Recurring	Recurring
Ken's grandmother		Yoo Ah Min	Recurring	Recurring
Ken's uncle	Taught his nephew Ken on how to "geng".	Wang Lei	Recurring	Recurring
Ken's uncle's good and best friend	Also taught Ken on how to "geng".	Tony Koh Beng Hoe	Recurring	Recurring
Mr. Jin	Aloysius' father	Chen Tianwen	Recurring	Recurring
Mrs. Jin	Aloysius' mother	Ye Li Mei	Recurring	Recurring
Mayoki	IP Man's girlfriend	Sherraine Law	Recurring	Recurring
1970s Army 3SG		Justin Dominic Mission	—N/a	Recurring
3WO K W Sng	Company Sergeant Major of Ninja Company	Wilson Ng	—N/a	Recurring
Gangster Zhen Zi Dan (literally "Real Bullet", loosely a parody of Donnie Yen)	Stole Mayoki, IP Man's girlfriend.	Benjamin Mok	—N/a	Recurring
Guest characters
Amy	Ken's girlfriend, dumped Ken as she felt that he was childish.	Qiu Qiu	Guest	—N/a
LTA S T Choong	An army officer.	mrbrown	—N/a	Guest

== Crew ==
The film was directed by Jack Neo and the script was written by Neo and Link Sng. Neo, Lim Teck, and Leonard Lai served as producers, while Neo's wife Irene Kng, along with Mang, Teck, Tengku Iesta, Tengku Alaudin, Kenny Chua, William Sin, Dominic Inn, Tan Tong Hai, Eric Liang and Sky Li Yunfei, served as executive producers.

== Merchandise ==
The films collaborated with Camou Products for a variety of army-themed merchandise made from decommissioned army apparel. The items, which include bags, mobile phone covers, and wine bags, were produced by around 80 women under a South West Community Development Council social programme. Neo stated, "We can help low-income families come up with this merchandise, which many youngsters will be interested to buy. So I thought this was a win-win situation." The cast and crews actively promoted the merchandise.

Ah Boys to Men 1, a comic book titled based on the movie, was published by Marshall Cavendish. The artwork was done by James Teo. Ah Boys to Men was released in DVD on 25 January 2013, which would sell for more than 50,000 units by the following month.

== Impact ==
In an interview with Cinema Online, Jack Neo described what the Ah Boys to Men duology meant to him, calling it "a miracle" for himself and his team. The film served as the starting point for the Ah Boys to Men franchise, a series of works that ultimately contributed to the Singapore Film Society honoring the filmmaker with its Lifetime Achievement Award at a gala celebration on January 2, 2026.

The film served as a career milestone and a breakthrough for several cast members, establishing them as professional actors and surging their popularity to the point where "getting mobbed by passionate fans has become part of their everyday life." Notably, Tosh Zhang won The New Paper's 2012 Breakout Star award. Several cast members went on to become frequent collaborators with Neo, returning for future installments in the franchise. A musical theatre adaptation of Ah Boys to Men and its sequel ran in April 2014, featuring several members of the original cast.

== See also ==
- Army Daze
- Honour and Passion
- Every Singaporean Son
- Every Singaporean Son – Epilogue
- Every Singaporean Son II – The Making of an Officer
- Rookies' Diary
- The Recruit Diaries
- When Duty Calls
- When Duty Calls 2
