= Ah Boys to Men 4 =

- Theatrical release poster
- Directed by: Jack Neo
- Written by: Jack Neo; Ivan Ho
- Produced by: Charlyn Ng; Seah Saw Yam
- Starring: Tosh Zhang; Wang Weiliang; Maxi Lim; Joshua Tan; Apple Chan
- Cinematography: Saravanann
- Edited by: Yim Mun Chong
- Music by: Zheng Kai Hua; Matthew Teng
- Production companies: J Team Productions mm2 Entertainment
- Distributed by: Golden Village Pictures; Clover Films
- Release date: November 9, 2017; (Singapore)
- Running time: 135 minutes
- Country: Singapore
- Languages: English; Mandarin; Hokkien
- Budget: $2.7 Million
- Box office: $4.5 Million

Ah Boys to Men 4 (Chinese: 新兵正传IV; pinyin: xīnbīng zhèngzhuàn IV; literally: "Recruits' True Biography") is a 2017 Singaporean military comedy film directed by Jack Neo. It stars Tosh Zhang, Wang Weiliang, Maxi Lim, Joshua Tan and Apple Chan in the fourth installment. It was released in cinemas on 9 November 2017.

== Plot ==
After leaving the military following the events of Ah Boys to Men and Ah Boys to Men 2 2SG, Alex Ong, CFC Lobang, CFC Aloysius Jin and CFC Ken Chow are busy with their respective career as civilians until they are called back to serve under the Singapore Armed Forces' Armoured Formation again. They then must juggle between work and reservist duties.

== Cast ==
- Tosh Zhang as 2SG Alex Ong, Platoon Sergeant
- Wang Weiliang as CFC Bang Lee Onn a.k.a. "Lobang"
- Maxi Lim as CFC Aloysius Jin a.k.a. "Wayang King"
- Joshua Tan as CFC Ken Chow
- Apple Chan as LTA Zhang Xinyi, Platoon Commander
- Noah Yap as CFC Man In Ping a.k.a. "IP Man"
- Jaspers Lai as CPL Handsome
- Charlie Goh as CPL Tan Wei Ming
- Ryan Lian as CPL Tan Keng Long a.k.a. "Ah Long"
- Ben Logan Sng as CPL Oh Chong Eng a.k.a. "CEO"
- Kishan J. as CFC Balan
- Hafiz Aziz as 3SG Taufik
- Foo Chay Yeow as CPL Fatty
- Hanrey Low as CPL Hanrey
- Justin Dominic Misson as 2WO H C Ong, Company Sergeant Major
- Wang Lei as 1970s Army 3SG, Section Commander
- Nick Teo as CFC Richard Tan
- Cai Ping Kai as 2SG Alex Ong's Grandmother
- Chen Xiuhuan as LTA Zhang Xin Yi's Mother

== Production ==
=== Pre-production ===
In March 2017, a teaser poster posted on the official Ah Boys To Men Facebook page, hinting that the film would be “moving out soon”. It was later confirmed by Neo, who was in the midst of writing the script, envisioning it to be one centred on reservist training and the Singapore Armed Forces’ Armoured Formation unit. Neo had also carried out research by visiting military bases.

=== Casting ===
Neo confirmed that Joshua Tan, Tosh Zhang, Wang Weiliang and Maxi Lim would return to star in the movie. He had also confirmed that Noah Yap would also be returning, after being jailed for 9 months for cannabis consumption and serving his National Service. Meanwhile, auditions were held for newer cast members.

Apple Chan was cast as a female officer, after Neo noted that many soldiers in the armour units were women. She had experience in mixed-martial arts, and had to undergo the same four-day armour orientation course as her male cast members.

In order to prepare for his role, Joshua Tan had to put on 30 kg within six months.

=== Filming ===
Filming started in June 2017, and ended in September 2017. Much of it took place at Sungei Gedong Camp and Dover Road, the latter in which the HDB flats were empty due to redevelopment. A certain scene, which depicted a search-and-destroy mission against an unnamed invader, involved tons of rubber, mostly made of prop foam, and cost $270,000 to shoot. Leopard 2SG and Bionix II armoured fighting vehicles operated by Singapore Armed Forces members were used for the filming.

=== Music ===
The official theme song of the film, titled "Frontline Soldiers", was shot by Lincoln Lin and written, composed by Shigga Shay, a YouTube personality. An official music video was uploaded on YouTube on October 20, 2017.

The first original soundtrack (OST) of the film, titled "The Boys Are Back", was written, composed and performed by Tosh Zhang, a YouTube personality who is part of the cast in the film. An official music video was uploaded on YouTube on November 11, 2017.

The second original soundtrack (OST) titled "Spend My Lifetime With You" performed by Amber Davis. An official music video was uploaded on YouTube on November 21, 2017.

== Reception ==
=== Critical reception ===
John Lui of The Straits Times rated the film a 2.5 out of 5 stars, citing the usual "banter, brotherhood and bravery", despite "the absence of anything that resembles long-form storytelling", viewing it as "a series of loosely connected skits".

Gabriel Chong of MovieXclusive.com rated the film a 3 out of 5 stars, as it resonated well with "anyone and everyone who has gone through NS" and related to the "evolution of the NS experience through the years". However, "the sequel is only a continuation from the earlier films in the loosest sense of the word", and although the characters remained the same, their vocations "have been entirely switched out".

Low Kay Hwa in his website Goody Feed rated it a 4 out of 5 stars "as an NSman to another NSman" but a 3 out of 5 stars to "a person who's just there for a laugh". He felt that the Neo "showed how NSmen like us have to compromise our work commitments due to our NS commitments, and how others who won't need to serve can commit more to their work." Meanwhile, it displayed the "authenticity of the ICT culture", "from the 'first-thing-to-do-in-ICT-is-canteen-break' to the bochup-ness of NSmen." Furthermore, the film "is all about the laughs, and while there were some good ones, there isn't a memorable one in this movie."

Melanis Tai of The New Paper rated it a 2.5 out of 5 stars, as "the plot is choppy and the jokes lose out to the last three films".

=== Box office ===
The film earned $310,000 on its opening day, which is about 30 percent more than the first film in the series, Ah Boys to Men. Within four days, it crossed the $2 million mark.

== Controversies ==
A controversy sparked in May 2017 when actor Shrey Bhargava posted on Facebook calling out the offensive audition process where he was asked by the casting director to “be more Indian”. He mentioned that when he clarified what that meant, he was told to “be a full blown Indian man”.

His Facebook post went viral and polarized the nation with many offering comments in support of him and many calling him racial slurs and pointing out that he was not doing his job as an actor. He was later questioned by the police for his post, who looked into the matter and "assessed that no criminal offence was disclosed". Subsequently, in an e-mail statement to The Straits Times, mm2 Entertainment said that "it is not uncommon during auditions that casting directors decide to test the versatility of actors", even though "(Neo) is acutely aware of race sensitivity and will be sensitive and careful when dealing with such a matter."

Shrey, in an interview with The Online Citizen, pointed out that this was not the case as he was not asked to portray the role in a variety of ways. Instead he was just asked to “be more Indian”. That was all he was made to do at the audition.

Prominent theatre artists such as Alfian Sa'at and Alvin Tan voiced their support for Shrey, while Ah Boys to Men actor, Maxi Lim and blogger, Xiaxue, criticized Shrey for playing the race card in order to “gain fame”.
