= The Lion Men: Ultimate Showdown =

The Lion Men: The Ultimate Showdown
- Film poster
- 狮神决战之: 终极一战
- Directed by: Jack Neo
- Written by: Jack Neo
- Produced by: Thum
- Starring: Tosh Zhang; Wang Weiliang; Eva Cheng; Chen Tianwen; Noah Yap; Charlie Goh; Maxi Lim; Zhang Xinxiang; Jaspers Lai; Bunz Bao; Rao Zi Jie; Celyn Liew
- Cinematography: Ardy Lam
- Edited by: Yim Mun Chong
- Music by: Mo Ju Li
- Production companies: J Team Productions; Mm2 Entertainment
- Distributed by: Shaw Organisation
- Release date: 12 June 2014
- Running time: 107 minutes
- Country: Singapore
- Languages: Mandarin; Hokkien; English
- Box office: US$856,343

The Lion Men: Ultimate Showdown (simplified Chinese: 狮神决战之: 终极一战; traditional Chinese: 獅神決戰之: 终极一戰) is a Singapore action comedy film directed by Jack Neo and starring Tosh Zhang, Wang Weiliang, Eva Cheng, Noah Yap, Charlie Goh, Maxi Lim, Chen Tianwen, Zhang Xinxiang, Jaspers Lai, Bunz Bao, Rao Zi Jie and Celyn Liew. The main plot revolves around three lion dance troupes pitting themselves against one another. It also marks the fourth on-screen reunion of Maxi Lim, Noah Yap, Wang Weiliang, Tosh Zhang, Charlie Goh and Chen Tianwen after their first and second collaborations together in Neo's previous popular and well-known army and military movies known as Ah Boys to Men and Ah Boys to Men 2.

== Plot ==
Continuing from The Lion Men, this film picks up after Mikey's superb Lion Dance Performance. Shi Shen becomes jealous of Mikey, especially after he discovers Mikey's feelings for Xiao Yu. Determined to succeed, Shi Shen spends more time doing lion dance training for the upcoming major lion dance competition, thus neglecting Xiao Yu. Situation worsens when Xiao Yu is kidnapped, forcing Shi Shen and Mikey to choose between the lion dance competition and their love for Xiao Yu.

== Cast ==
- Tosh Zhang as Shi Shen/Supreme
- Wang Weiliang as Mikey
- Eva Cheng as Xiao Yu
- Chen Tianwen as Master He, the Head Master of Tiger Crane Lion Dance Association
- Noah Yap as Zhang Bu Da
- Charlie Goh as Ah Qiang
- Maxi Lim as Babyface
- Zhang Xinxiang as the Director of Flying Clouds Lion Dance Academy, later became Master of Storm Riders
- Jaspers Lai as Sam, the Leader of Black Hawk Lion Dance Troupe
- Bunz Bao as Xiao Wang Zi
- Rao Zi Jie as Tommy
- Celyn Liew as Bing

== Production ==
=== Music ===
The official theme song of this film, titled "We Are Brothers" was composed by Jack Neo, Tosh Zhang and Bunz Bao.

== Release ==
The film was released on 12 June 2014.
