= I Believe (film) =

2016 short film

- Directed by: Leroy Lim
- Written by: Dhinesh Ravichandran
- Produced by: Nikko Koh May May
- Starring: Joshua Lim; Maxi Lim
- Edited by: Zulhairi
- Release date: 20 May 2016
- Running time: 16 minutes
- Country: Singapore
- Language: English

I Believe is a 2016 Singaporean short film directed by student director Leroy Lim. Mm2 Entertainment have opted to produce Lim's first full-length film.

== Cast ==
- Joshua Lim as Peter
- Maxi Lim as Anthony
- Yap Hui Xin as Janice
- Smiley Goh as Paster Benjamin
- Derric Cheong as Peter's friend 1
- Sean Lee Kah Wai as Peter's friend 2
- Faith Toh as Anthony's mother

== Production ==
I Believe was produced with Lim's schoolmates, Nikko Koh and Dhinesh Ravichandran from LASALLE College of the Arts. Veteran filmmaker Wee Li Lin was the project mentor.
