= Kopi-O II =

- 浓浓咖啡乌
- Directed by: Lin Mingzhe 林明哲
- Starring: Cai Ping Kai; Chen Tianwen; Richard Low
- Original language: Chinese
- No. of episodes: 30

Production
- Running time: approx. 45 minutes

Original release
- Network: MediaCorp TV Channel 8
- Release: 9 July – 9 September 2002

Related
- 118; 118 II; 118 Reunion

Kopi-O II (Chinese: 浓浓咖啡乌) is the sequel to popular series Kopi-O which aired in 1985. It debuted in July 2002 and consists of 30 episodes. Veteran actors such as Cai Ping Kai, Qian Zhigang, Xiang Yun and Huang Yiliang return from the original series while many younger artistes made their early television appearances.

== Plot ==
The series chronicles the everyday lives of vendors and workers at the humble neighbourhood kopitiam, the heart of Singaporean life. People from all statuses and walks of life cross paths at the kopitiam.

Sixth Auntie lives with her eldest son Jianzhong and his wife but was later driven out by them. Her second son Shen Jianyi is disabled so she moves in with her youngest son Shen Jianren who is the Head Master of his very owned Lion Dance Association. Besides being the lion dancer, he conceals his identity by running a western food stall with his wife Yuyan at the neighbourhood kopitiam. He shares the kopitiam with several other vendors, each with their own stories and hidden secrets.

== Cast ==
- Choy Peng Hoy (Cai Pingkai) as "Sixth Auntie" 六婶
- Chen Tianwen as Shen Jianren 沈健仁
- Richard Low as Chen Mingcai 陈明财, sells chicken rice
- Bryan Chan as Shen Jianyi 沈健义
- Liu Qiulian as Wu Yuyan 吴玉燕, Jianren's wife
- Tracer Wong as Wang Aizhen 王爱珍, Mingcai's wife
- Li Yinzhu as Xiuzhu 秀珠, sells fish porridge and noodles
- Zen Chong as Hong Fuxing 洪福星, Xiuzhu's grandson
- Joey Ng as Pauline 林佩玲, Fuxing's girlfriend
- Qian Chi Kang 钱治钢 as Hong Jintu 沈金土, Jinbao's father
- Huang Yiliang as Wenjuan 文隽
- Nick Shen as Hong Jinbao 洪金宝, Jintu's son
- Yang Lina
- Vivian Lai as Stella aka shuyun aka xiaoyun, Jinhua's daughter
- Xiang Yun as Hong Jinhua 洪金花, Stella's mother
- Liang Tian as Hong Tian 洪天, Fuxing's biological father
- Le Yao as Randy 陈丽珊
- John Wong Teck Yenn as Shui Lian 水莲
- Ang Puay Heng
