= Tosh Zhang =

Singaporean actor and singer (born 1989)

- Born: Tosh Zhang Zhiyang; 23 May 1989 (age 37); Singapore
- Education: Republic Polytechnic
- Occupations: Actor, Musician
- Years active: 2012–present

Chinese name
- Simplified Chinese: 张智扬
Transcriptions
Standard Mandarin
- Hanyu Pinyin: Zhāng Zhì Yáng
- Musical career
- Also known as: Tosh13, Tosh Rock

Tosh Zhang Zhiyang (born 23 May 1989) is a Singaporean actor and musician. Zhang is most well-known for his catchy songs which garnered millions of views on YouTube and for playing the role of 'Sergeant Ong' in the record-breaking Ah Boys to Men movie series by director Jack Neo.

== Early life ==
At 12, Tosh fell in love with hiphop culture through breakdancing and he was eventually recruited to join breakdancing crew Radikal Forze in his teenage years. Tosh began his journey into show business around 2010 when he started vlogging on YouTube with Tosh13 as his username.

== Career ==
Tosh started his media career with the films Ah Boys to Men (2012) and Ah Boys to Men 2 (2013).

=== Business ===
Tosh has since started a shop with friends in Queensway Shopping Centre called Cream Capsule, which opened on 30 January 2021. The shop sells various types of street clothing among other accessories.

== Discography ==
=== Singles ===
Year	Title	Album	Notes
2012	Recruit's Anthem	Non-album single	Theme song for Ah Boys to Men
2013	Brothers	Non-album single	Theme song for Ah Boys to Men 2
2014	我们的故事	Non-album single	Theme song for The Lion Men
2014	我们。兄弟 We Are Brothers	Non-album single	Theme song for The Lion Men: Ultimate Showdown
2015	Who Else	Non-album single	Theme song for Ah Boys to Men 3: Frogmen
2015	I'm Sorry 对不起	Non-album single	Feat Wang Weiliang
2015	What More Can I Say	Non-album single	
2015	给我一个吻 Can I Have A Kiss	Non-album single	Remix
2016	放映爱	Non-album single	Theme song for My Love, Sinema
2017	团圆FUN	Non-album single	2017 Chinese New Year Song
2017	Frontline Soldiers	Non-album Single	Theme song for Ah Boys to Men 4
2017	The Boys Are Back	Non-Album Single	Featured at the end of Ah Boys to Men 4
2018	Wihayo	Non-album Single	
2018	Mungkin Nanti (Cover) feat. Noah Yap	Non-album Single	From Original Indonesian Song 'Mungkin Nanti' by Peterpan
2018	呆在家	Non-album Single	

== Filmography ==
=== Film ===
Year	Title	Role	Notes	Ref.
2012	Ah Boys to Men	Second Sergeant Alex Ong		
2013	Ah Boys to Men 2	Second Sergeant Alex Ong		
2014	The Lion Men	Shi Shen/Supreme		
2014	The Lion Men: Ultimate Showdown	Shi Shen/Supreme		
2015	Ah Boys to Men 3: Frogmen	Third Warrant Officer Alex Ong		
2015	Mr. Unbelievable	Lawrence		
2016	Long Long Time Ago	Third Sergeant Alex Ong	Cameo	
2016	My Love Sinema	陈自强 Ah Kheong		
2017	Ah Boys to Men 4	Second Sergeant Alex Ong		
2019	So Bright 2	小迪		

=== Television series ===
Year	Title	Role	Notes	Ref.
2014	World at Your Feet	Ah Wei (special appearance)		
2016	Marco Polo	Bai		
2019	The Wedding Survival Handbook	Shun		
2022	It's All Your Fault!	Peter		

=== Variety / Television show ===
Year	Title	Network	Notes	Ref.
2015	Mission S-change	StarHub TV	Host	
2017	Let's Go Dating	Mediacorp Channel 8	Host	
2017	Meet the MP	Mediacorp Channel 5	Tosh Rock; also performer of theme song 'Meet the MP'	

=== Theater ===
Year	Title	Role	Notes	Ref.
2014	Ah Boys to Men: The Musical	Second Sergeant Alex Ong		

== Awards and nominations ==
Year	Award	Category	Nominated work	Result	Ref.
2017	Vancouver Golden Panda International Film Festival	Best Actor	My Love, Sinema	Nominated	
