= The Landlady Singer =

2023 Singaporean television series

- Promotional banner
- Traditional Chinese: 包租婆要當歌手
- Simplified Chinese: 包租婆要当歌手
- Literal meaning: "The landlady wants to be a singer"
- Hanyu Pinyin: Bāo zū pó yào dāng gē shǒu
- Genre: Musical; Comedy
- Written by: Link Sng
- Directed by: Hu Heyi
- Starring: Liu Lingling; Wang Weiliang; Xenia Tan; Wang Yuqing; Lin Youfa
- Country of origin: Singapore
- Original language: Mandarin
- No. of seasons: 2
- No. of episodes: 8

Production
- Producers: Jarell Siek, Jan Lee, Clarissa Soon
- Running time: 30 minutes
- Production companies: mm2 Entertainment; Mediacorp

Original release
- Network: Channel 8
- Release: 17 October 2023 – 2023

The Landlady Singer (Chinese: 包租婆要当歌手) is a 2023 Singaporean musical comedy series starring Liu Lingling, Wang Weiliang, Xenia Tan, Wang Yuqing and Lin Youfa. It airs every Tuesday, from 17 October 2023, at 8pm on Mediacorp Channel 8.

== Synopsis ==
Wanting to earn extra cash to visit her son in London, Ying-jie decides to rent out her spare rooms to A-wei, a deliveryman, and Jiexi, a timid young woman. Ying-jie's nephew, Uncle Jian, moves in as well as his house is under renovation. Gradually unable to withstand the lifestyle habits of her new tenants, Ying-jie sets to chase them out of her house. However, despite their differences, the four eventually forms a bond through music and they decide to join a music competition as a quartet.

== Cast ==
- Liu Lingling as Ying-jie
- Wang Weiliang as A-wei
- Xenia Tan as Jiexi
- Wang Yuqing as Uncle Jian
- Lin Youfa as Neighbour Wang

== Production ==
The series was directed by Hu Heyi.

Four songs were re-interpreted for the cast to sing. The music and scores were supervised and produced by local musician Bunz.
