= Chen Tianwen =

Singaporean actor

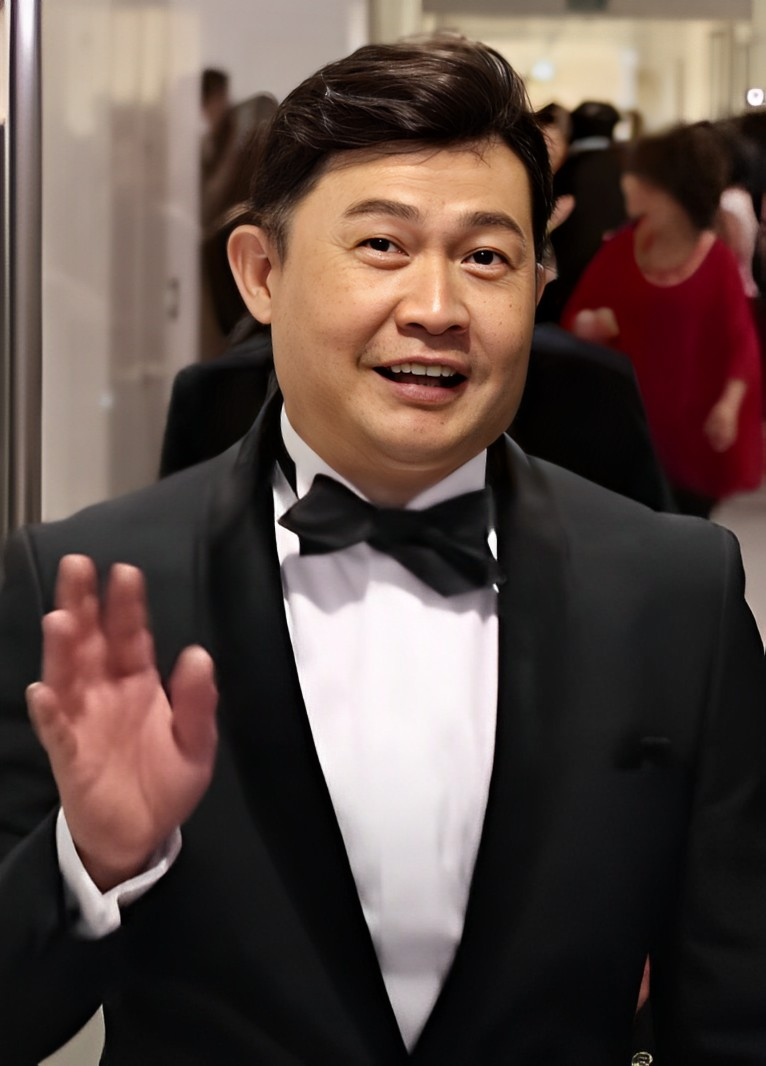
- Chen at the Star Awards 2017
- Born: 28 May 1963 (age 63); Singapore
- Occupation: Actor
- Years active: 1984–present
- Spouse: Bao Xiaohui (m. 2014)
- Children: 1
- Awards: Star Awards 1997: Top 10 Most Popular Male Artistes

Chinese name
- Traditional Chinese: 陳天文
- Simplified Chinese: 陈天文
- Hanyu Pinyin: Chén Tiānwén

Chen Tianwen (born 28 May 1963) is a Singaporean actor.

== Career ==
Chen joined the Singapore Broadcasting Corporation after completing the 5th artiste drama training class and made his debut in 1984. He is contracted to Mediacorp, starring in many Chinese-language Singaporean dramas shown on MediaCorp Channel 8 since the 1990s. He has also starred in Singaporean movies including Ah Boys to Men, Ah Boys to Men 2, Ilo Ilo, The Lion Men, The Lion Men: Ultimate Showdown, Ah Boys to Men 3: Frogmen, Mr. Unbelievable, Lulu the Movie and Take 2.

Chen holds a black belt in taekwondo and his martial arts background led to him being cast in many Wuxia dramas in the 1990s and as characters with fight scenes in other drama series. He is also a member of the Singapore Celebrity Soccer Team.

The Straits Times remarked that Chen's "much-praised understated turn" in the Cannes Film Festival award-winning film Ilo Ilo put him in the spotlight once again.

In 2015, as part of an episode of Channel 5 dramedy Spouse For House, Chen's parody music video titled "Unbelievable", was "lauded" for the nonsensical line "I so stunned like vegetable" [sic], drawing the attention of Time magazine. A second parody music video, "Sandcastle in My Heart", in which Irene Ang also starred, did not become as popular as the previous one. Both videos are a parody of popular Chinese MVs in the 1970s, particularly the work of Singaporean singer Huang Qing Yuan. The "Unbelievable" music video was top of YouTube's list of the top trending (non-music) videos in Singapore for 2015.

In 2021, Chen launched ready to eat meals branded as Mr Lazy Bum with three partners, including fellow actor Ye Shipin.

== Personal life ==
Chen studied at Serangoon Garden Secondary Technical School.

Chen told Channel NewsAsia that he and Bao Xiao Hui, a Mongolian, were married in May 2014. The couple had a son named Genghis Chan, who was born on 12 June 2015.

== Filmography ==
=== Film ===
Year	Title	Role	Notes	Ref.
2012	Ah Boys to Men	Mr. Jin, Aloysius' father		
2013	Ah Boys to Men 2	Mr. Jin, Aloysius' father		
2013	Ilo Ilo	Lim Teck		
2014	The Lion Men	Master He		
2014	The Lion Men: Ultimate Showdown	Master He		
2015	Ah Boys to Men 3: Frogmen	Mr. Jin, Aloysius father		
2015	Mr. Unbelievable	Eric Kwek Hock Seng		
2016	Lulu the Movie	Brad Pit		
2017	Take 2	Di Tie		
2019	When Ghost Meets Zombie	Village Head		

=== Television series ===
Year	Title	Role	Notes	Ref.
1984	The Awakening			
1984	Youth (年轻人之奎笼恋歌)	Wang Xiaoda		
1985	The Young Heroes (少年英雄)	Chen Tiezhu		
1985	Unyielding Butterflies (铁蝴蝶)	Meng Chuqiao		
1985	Man from the Past (大侠吴三奇)	Wu Sanqi		
1986	The Sword and the Song	Zhao Guangyi		
1986	First Step (踏上征途)	Li Jianhui		
1986	Men of Valour (盗日英雄传)	Yue Feng		
1987	Moving On (变迁)	Zhuang Rongguang		
1988	Ups and Downs (婚姻保险)	Deng Qianfan		
1988	Teahouse in Chinatown (牛车水人家)	Chen Defu		
1988	The Last Applause (舞榭歌台)	Shen Desheng		
1988	Airforce	Wu Hongfa		
1989	Turn of the Tide (浮沉)	Gu Yongsheng		
1989	Magic of Dance (鼓舞青春)			
1990	Navy (壮志豪情)	Xie Wenhuai		
1990	Village Hero (大吉传奇)	Zheng Tong		
1991	Legend of a Beauty (一代天骄)	Ye Feng		
1991	The Last Swordsman (最后一个大侠)	Liu Sheng Ci Lang		
1991	Private Eyes (妙探智多星)	Gao Guangyi		
1991	Behind Bars (铁狱雷霆)	Feng Lingzheng		
1992	Woman of Substance (悲欢岁月)	Hong Hui		
1993	Web of Deceit (鹤啸九天)	Zhu Zihe		
1993	The Great Conspiracy (莲花争霸)	Nan Gongjian		
1993	Endless Love (未了缘)	Yu Jiahui		
1993	Angel of Vengeance (暴雨狂花)	Wang Jiahui		
1993	Heavenly Beings (再战封神榜)	Hu Jiansheng		
1994	Silk and Romance (情丝万缕)	Shao Wenxuan		
1994	Challenger (勇者无惧)	Li Jin		
1994	Thunder Plot (惊天大阴谋)	Li Baoluo		
1994	Men on the Edge (帮会1889)	Li A-Hai		
1994	Young Justice Bao (侠义包公)	Di Qing		
1995	The Shadow Mission (地下猎人)	Lin Hanbiao		
1995	Heavenly Ghost Catcher (天师钟馗)			
1995	Heartbeat (医胆仁心)	Lin Yuanda		
1996	Life on the Line (魂断四面佛)	Superintendent		
1996	Kung Fu Master 1996 (掌门人1996)	Chen Zhi		
1997	Sword and Honour (铁血男儿)	Zheng He		
1997	The Royal Monk (真命小和尚)	Iron Bucket		
1997	The Gods Must Be Rich (财神到)	Pai Guwang		
1998	Legend of the Eight Immortals	The Evil Dragon		
1998	The Royal Monk 2 (真命小和尚之十二铜人)	Iron Bucket		
1999	From the Medical Files 2 (医生档案2)	Zhou Yuhui		
1999	Back to School (摩登状元)	Liao Guoren		
1999	Out to Win (步步为赢)	Xu Mingquan		
1999	Legends of Ne Zha (莲花童子－哪吒)	Shen Gongbao		
2000	The Legendary Swordsman	Tian Boguang		
2000	Luan Shi Pian Xia (乱世骗侠)			
2001	The Hotel	Raymond Boo		
2001	Beyond the Axis of Truth	Li Zeyuan		
2001	My Genie (我爱精灵)			
2002	Kopi-O II	Shen Jianren		
2002	No Problem! (考试家族)	Sampson		
2002	Bukit Ho Swee	Feng Sidong		
2003	A Toast of Love	Wu Guanghui		
2003	Holland V	Gao Tianxiang		
2003	Health Matters 2 (一切由慎开始2)	Lin Xiangfeng		
2004	Devil's Blues (叛逆战队)			
2004	A Child's Hope 2 (孩有明天2)			
2004	Man at Forty	Wang Shaoqi		
2004	Double Happiness	William		
2004	Double Happiness II	William		
2005	The Dragon Heroes	Xiang Hai		
2006	Love at 0°C	Liao Qunfang		
2006	CID	Li Fuzhong		
2006	Magical Hands (猜心妙手)			
2007	Kinship 2	Chen Anxin		
2007	Kinship	Chen Anxin		
2007	Mars vs Venus	Ah Wu		
2007	Let It Shine	Lin Youwei's father		
2008	Love Blossoms	Lu Gua		
2008	Love Blossoms II	Lu Gua		
2008	By My Side	Andy		
2009	Mr & Mrs Kok (妙探夫妻档)			
2009	My School Daze	Ma Guoliang		
2010	Happy Family	Dong Jingxing		
2010	New Beginnings	Chen Congming		
2010	No Limits	Ou Yingxiong		
2010	Unriddle	Chai Dexing		
2011	On the Fringe	Luo Biao		
2012	Unriddle 2	Hei Tian		
2012	Poetic Justice	Huang-ge		
2012	It Takes Two	Opposition Party Lao Cai		
2013	Sudden	Chen Huiwu		
2013	Disclosed	Zhang Youguo		
2014	Yes We Can!	Jiang Wen		
2014	118	Zhang Tiancheng		
2015	Life Is Beautiful	Albert Zhang		
2015	Spouse for House	Eric Kwek		
2016	Don't Worry, Be Healthy	Hong Maoqiang		
2016	The Dream Job	Zhang Mingde		
2016	C.L.I.F. 4	Zhao Xuewei		
2016	K.O.	Li Chengda		
2016	Hero	Guan A-li		
2016	118 II	Zhang Tiancheng		
2017	Eat Already? 2	Pineapple Head		
2018	Mind Matters	Lu Liangsheng		
2018	Life Less Ordinary	Curry Puff		
2018	VIC	Security Guard	Cameo	
2018	Heart To Heart	Wu Liang		
2019	Hello From The Other Side (阴错阳差)	Da Niu		
2019	Hello From The Other Side - Its Time (阴错阳差 – 时辰到)	Da Niu	Cameo	
2019	C.L.I.F. 5	Lucas Chew		
2019	The Good Fight (致胜出击)	Yan Dongshan		
2020	My Guardian Angels (单翼天使)	Ye Jinquan		
2020	A Jungle Survivor (森林生存记)	Dong Suncheng		
2020	Super Dad (男神不败)	Ah Jin		
2020	Mister Flower (花花公子)	Zhu Guodong		
2021	Mr Zhou's Ghost Stories@Job Haunting	Heng		
2021	Key Witness (关键证人)	Li Tianyun		
2021	Watch Out! Alexius (小心啊！谢宇航)	Li Taibai		
2021	So Old yet So Young (心里住着老灵魂)	Wu Lihao		
2022	Dark Angel (黑天使)	Fang Zhengde		
2022	Soul Doctor (灵医)	Wu Zhenhe		
2022	You Can Be An Angel 4 (你也可以是天使4)	Liu Zhihai		
2022	In Safe Hands (守护星)	Qian Caishun		
2023	Cash on Delivery	Qian		
2023	Whatever Will Be, Will Be	House owner	Dialect series & Cameo	
2025	Emerald Hill - The Little Nyonya Story (小娘惹之翡翠山)	Wu De		

== Discography ==
=== Compilation albums ===
Year	English title	Mandarin title
2009	MediaCorp Music Lunar New Year Album 09	新传媒福牛迎端年
2013	MediaCorp Music Lunar New Year Album 13	新传媒金蛇献祥福

== Awards and nominations ==
Year	Organisation	Category	Nominated work	Result	Ref
1997	Star Awards	Best Supporting Actor	The Royal Monk (as Tie Tong)	Nominated	
1997	Star Awards	Top 10 Most Popular Male Artistes	—N/a	Won	
1998	Star Awards	Top 10 Most Popular Male Artistes	—N/a	Nominated	
2000	Star Awards	Top 10 Most Popular Male Artistes	—N/a	Nominated	
2001	Star Awards	Top 10 Most Popular Male Artistes	—N/a	Nominated	
2002	Star Awards	Top 10 Most Popular Male Artistes	—N/a	Nominated	
2010	Star Awards	Unforgettable Villain	Love Blossoms II (as Lu Gua)	Nominated	
2013	50th Golden Horse Awards	Best Supporting Actor	Ilo Ilo	Nominated	
2016	Star Awards	Best Supporting Actor	118(as Zhang Tiancheng)	Nominated	
2016	Star Awards	Best Evergreen Artiste	118(as Zhang Tiancheng)	Nominated	
2016	Star Awards	Top 10 Most Popular Male Artistes	—N/a	Nominated	
2017	Star Awards	Top 10 Most Popular Male Artistes	—N/a	Nominated	
2021	Star Awards	Top 10 Most Popular Male Artistes	—N/a	Nominated	
2022	Star Awards	Top 10 Most Popular Male Artistes	—N/a	Nominated	
2022	Star Awards	Most Hated Villain	Mister Flower (as Zhu Guodong)	Nominated	
2023	Star Awards	Top 10 Most Popular Male Artistes	—N/a	Nominated	
