= Charlie Goh =

Singaporean actor and singer

- Born: 1988 or 1989 (age 37–38); Singapore
- Occupations: Actor; singer
- Years active: 2012–present
- Spouse: Pearlene Sim (m. 2017)

Chinese name
- Traditional Chinese: 吴清樑
- Simplified Chinese: 吴清樑
- Hanyu Pinyin: Wú Qingliáng

Charlie Goh Seng Liang (born September 1988) is a Singaporean actor and singer. Goh came to attention upon the local box-office successes of Ah Boys to Men movie series by director Jack Neo.

== Career ==
Goh obtained his real estate license in 2023.

== Personal life ==
Goh is married to Pearlene Sim.

== Filmography ==
=== Film ===
Year	Title	Role	Notes	Ref.
2012	Ah Boys to Men	Recruit Tan Wei Ming		
2013	Ah Boys to Men 2	Recruit Tan Wei Ming		
2014	The Lion Men	Ah Qiang		
2014	The Lion Men: Ultimate Showdown	Ah Qiang		
2015	Ah Boys to Men 3: Frogmen	Corporal Tan Wei Ming		
2017	Ah Boys to Men 4	Corporal Tan Wei Ming		
2022	Ah Girls Go Army	Lieutenant C Y Song		
2022	The Betrothal Ceremony (Guo Da Li)	Ryan	Short film	

=== Television series ===
Year	Title	Role	Notes	Ref.
2013	Crimewatch	Ah Chye		
2014	World at Your Feet	Cheng Jin	Special appearance	
2015	Tanglin	Eddie Tong		
2017	The Lead	Jack	Cameo	
2018–2022	KIN	Matthew Quah		
2018	KIN: Matthew's Story	Matthew Quah		
2018	The Fifth Floor	Nick		
2020–2022	128 Circle	Ethan		
2023	Silent Walls	Wu Tianhua		
2023	The Sky Is Still Blue	Dr. Loh		
2023	All That Glitters	George		
2026	Spooky in Love	Danny Tan	Cameo (3 episodes)	

== Awards and nominations ==
Year	Organisation	Category	Nominated work	Result	Ref
2024	Star Awards	Top 10 Most Popular Male Artistes	—N/a	Nominated	
