= Maxi Lim =

Singaporean actor

- Born: 12 March 1987 (age 39); Singapore
- Education: Temasek Polytechnic
- Occupation: Actor
- Spouse: Liz Teo (m. 2020; div. 2024)
- Children: 1

Chinese name
- Traditional Chinese: 林俊良
- Simplified Chinese: 林俊良
- Hanyu Pinyin: Lín Jùnliáng

Maxi Lim Jun Liang (born 12 March 1987) is a Singaporean actor.

== Early life and education ==
Lim graduated from Temasek Polytechnic with a diploma in interactive media design.

== Career ==
Lim is best known for playing the comical and eager-to-please "Wayang King" in hit local movie Ah Boys to Men series. He reprised in role in a 2014 musical adaptation of the movie.

== Personal life ==
Lim married actress Liz Teo on 29 March 2020. They announced that they are expecting a child in September. On 29 August, Teo given birth to a baby boy named Reign. In January 2024, they announced their separation.

== Controversies ==
In December 2020, news of Lim's wedding allegedly breaching COVID-19 rules surfaced.

== Filmography ==
=== Film ===
Year	Title	Role	Notes	Ref
2010	Left Hook	Fighter	Short film	
2011	Stories	Henchman	Short film	
2011	The Invisible Monster	Bert	Short film	
2011	Silence on Set	Edmund	Short film	
2011	Sanzaru		Short film	
2011	Band of Mischief	Albert	Short film	
2011	Allegiance	Qiang	Short film	
2012	The Truth	Allen	Video short	
2012	Ah Boys to Men	Recruit Aloysius Jin		
2013	Ah Boys to Men 2	Recruit Aloysius Jin		
2013	Purple Light	Wei Jie	Short film	
2014	The Lion Men	Babyface		
2014	The Lion Men: Ultimate Showdown	Babyface		
2014	Dill Doe		Short film	
2015	Ah Boys to Men 3: Frogmen	3rd Sergeant Aloysius Jin		
2016	I Believe	Anthony	Short film	
2017	Take 2	Jian Ren		
2017	Ah Boys to Men 4	Corporal First Class Aloysius Jin		
2022	Ah Girls Go Army	Captain Aloysius Jin		
2024	Money No Enough 3	Police Officer at Roadblock		

=== Television series ===
Year	Title	Role	Notes	Ref
2012	In Cold Blood: Parental Abuse	Joshua		
2013	Serangoon Road	Gao Yi		
2014	World at Your Feet	Jiang Shui		
2015	Sealed with a Kiss	Du Junjie		
2015	The Dream Makers II	Jack		
2018–2022	Kin	Loh Ah Hock		
2020	Best Friends Forever (致2020的我们)			
2023	Oppa, Saranghae!	Ouyang Didi		

=== Radio show ===
Year	Title	Network	Notes
2015	Ning @ Night	Y.E.S. 93.3FM	DJ

== Theater ==
Year	Title	Role
2014	Ah Boys to Men: The Musical	Aloysius Jin

== Awards and nominations ==
Year	Award	Category	Nominated work	Result
2014	5th Singapore Short Film Awards	Best Performance	Dill Doe	Nominated
