= Joshua Tan =

Australian actor based in Singapore (born 1990)

- Born: 19 August 1990 (age 36); Australia
- Education: Monash University
- Occupations: Actor, singer
- Spouse: Tay Zoen (m. 2022)

Chinese name
- Traditional Chinese: 陳偉恩
- Simplified Chinese: 陈伟恩
Transcriptions
Standard Mandarin
- Hanyu Pinyin: Chén Wěi Ēn

Joshua Tan Wei En (born 19 August 1990) is an Australian actor and singer based in Singapore.

== Career ==
Tan has become a local celebrity after the successes of Ah Boys to Men movie series as Ken Chow by director Jack Neo.

== Personal life ==
Tan was born in Melbourne, Australia but was raised in Singapore. He has a degree from Melbourne's Monash University. He married Zoen Tay on 26 December 2022.

== Filmography ==
=== Film ===
Year	Title	Role	Notes	Ref
2012	Ah Boys to Men	Recruit Ken Chow		
2013	Ah Boys to Men 2	Recruit Ken Chow		
2014	Hong Baos and Kisses	Xavier Tan		
2015	Ah Boys to Men 3: Frogmen	3SG Ken Chow		
2016	Long Long Time Ago	Corporal Ken Chow	Cameo	
2016	Young & Fabulous	Hao Ren		
2017	Ah Boys to Men 4	Corporal First Class Ken Chow		

=== Television series ===
Year	Title	Role	Notes	Ref
2015	Lion Mums	Marcus Lim		
2016	A Selfie's Tale	Hans Lee Hao Nan		
2017	Lion Mums 2	Marcus Lim		
2018	You Can Be An Angel 3	Ray Lee Yingjie 李英杰		
2019	How Are You?	Ouyang Ming 欧阳明		
2019	Lion Mums 3	Marcus Lim		
2020	Best Friends Forever	Ouyang Jie 欧阳杰		
2020	How Are You 2	Ouyang Ming 欧阳明		
2021-22	Lion Mums 4	Marcus Lim		
2022	Little Women	Hotel receptionist	Cameo	
2023	Mr Zhou's Ghost stories @ Job Haunting II	Ah Qiang 阿强		

=== Variety ===
Year	Title	Role
2017	Super 100	Himself

=== Theater ===
Year	Title	Role	Ref
2017	Flying Through Time	Tiger	

== Awards and nominations ==
Year	Ceremony	Category	Nominated work	Result	Ref
2021	Star Awards	Top 10 Most Popular Male Artistes	—N/a	Nominated	
