= Zhang Xinxiang =

Singaporean actor and businessman (born 1967)

- Born: Teo Boon Seong; 27 April 1967 (age 59); Singapore
- Occupations: Actor; businessman
- Years active: 1989−present
- Spouse: Zheng Xiuzhu (m. 1991)
- Children: 2

Current stage name
- Traditional Chinese: 張信祥
- Simplified Chinese: 张信祥
- Hanyu Pinyin: Zhāng Xìnxiáng

Birth name
- Traditional Chinese: 張文祥
- Simplified Chinese: 张文祥
- Hanyu Pinyin: Zhāng Wénxiáng

Former stage name
- Traditional Chinese: 張汶祥
- Simplified Chinese: 张汶祥
- Hanyu Pinyin: Zhāng Wénxiáng

Zhang Xinxiang (born Teo Boon Seong on 27 April 1967), formerly known as Zhang Wenxiang, is a Singaporean actor and businessman.

== Early life and career ==
The eldest son in his family, Zhang began acting in 1989 − his first full-time job after completing his mandatory military service. He went through Singapore Broadcasting Corporation (SBC)'s auditions and attended their training classes while juggling a side job as a waiter for a few months before being offered a two-year contract by SBC. He left the TV station in 1995 to focus on his mini-mart business and returned to sign a two-year contract with the station in 2004. He has since become a freelancer.

Zhang owns the boutique shop Nana, with its outlets located in the malls The Arcade and International Plaza.

== Personal life ==
In April 1991, Zhang married his girlfriend of 4 years, Zheng Xiuzhu, at the age of 24. They have two children. Preferring to keep a low profile outside of his acting career in later years, Zhang has declined to talk more about his family in interviews, citing that he is "more than happy to talk about [his] work or projects and [doesn't] think people are interested to know about [his] personal life anyway".

Zhang formerly used the Chinese stage name 张汶祥 (Zhāng Wénxiáng). In late 2016, Zhang changed his Chinese stage name to Zhang Xinxiang (张信祥).

== Filmography ==
Zhang has appeared in numerous television series and films.

=== Television series ===
- Finishing Line (1990)
- Journey's End (1990)
- Two Of Us (1990)
- Enchanted Eyes (1990)
- Crime & Passion (1990)
- Ladies In Action (1991)
- Modern Romance (1991)
- Fiery Passion (1991)
- The Last Swordsman (1991)
- Lady Steel (1991)
- Terms Of Endearment (1992)
- The Male Syndrome (1992)
- The Brave Ones (1992)
- The Great Conspiracy (1993)
- The Wilful Siblings (1993)
- Heaven's Will (1993)
- Young Justice Bao (1994)
- The Challenger (1994)
- Heavenly Ghost Catcher (1995)
- The Teochew Family (1995)
- The Last Rhythm (1995)
- The Golden Pillow (1995)
- Morning Express (1995)
- King of Hades (1995)
- Ah Xue (1995)
- Triad Justice (1996)
- Three In One Love (1996)
- Tales of the Third Kind (1996)
- Looking for Stars (2000)
- Cash Is King (2002)
- Tonight I Will Tell I (2002)
- Holland V (2003)
- Love Is Beautiful (2003)
- Timeless Gift (2004)
- Room in My Heart (2004)
- Family Combo (2004)
- Family Combo II (2005)
- Portrait of Home (2005)
- You Are the One (2005)
- A Million Treasures (2006)
- Lady of Leisure (2006)
- Dear, Dear Son-In-Law (2007)
- Kinship (2007)
- Happily Ever After (2007)
- The Greatest Love of All (2007)
- Table of Glory (2009)
- The Promise (2009)
- The Ultimatum (2009)
- The Promise (2010)
- Devotion (2011)
- Code of Honour (2011)
- Unriddle (2011)
- Game Plan (2012)
- The Quarters (2012)
- Alien (2012)
- The Enchanted (2013)
- C.L.I.F. 2 (2013)
- Sudden (2013)
- Marry Me (2013)
- 118 (2014)
- Against the Tide (2014)
- The Journey: Our Homeland (2015)
- The Queen (2016)
- The Truth Seekers (2016)
- Trapped Minds (2016)
- Eat Already? 4 (2018)
- Doppelganger (2018)
- Tree in the River (2018)
- My Agent Is A Hero (2018)
- The Little Nyonya (2020)
- My Mini-me and Me (2021)
- Dark Angel (2022)
- Soul Detective (2022)
- Oppa, Saranghae! (2023)
- The Sky is Still Blue (2023)
- Silent Walls (2023)
- Kill Sera Sera (2024)

=== Film ===
- Body Puzzle (2002)
- Twilight Kitchen (2003)
- One Last Dance (2006)
- Love 50% (2010)
- Taxi! Taxi! (2013)
- Everybody's Business (2013)
- The Lion Men (2014)
- The Lion Men: Ultimate Showdown (2014)
- Standing in Still Water (2014)
- Mr. Unbelievable (2015)
- Paper House (2017; short film)

== Awards and nominations ==
Year	Award	Category	Nominated work	Result	Ref
1995	Star Awards 1995	Best Supporting Actor	Young Justice Bao	Nominated	
1996	Star Awards 1996	Best Supporting Actor	The Golden Pillow	Nominated	
2004	Star Awards 2004	Best Comedy Performer	Family Combo	Nominated	
2004	Star Awards 2004	Best Supporting Actor	Timeless Gift	Nominated	
2005	Star Awards 2005	Best Comedy Performer	Family Combo II	Nominated	
