= Let's Go Dating =

- 我们去相亲
- Genre: Variety
- Presented by: Youyi; Wang Weiliang; Tosh Zhang; Teddy Tang
- Country of origin: Singapore
- Original language: Mandarin

Production
- Running time: 30 minutes (with advertisements)

Original release
- Network: Mediacorp Channel 8
- Release: January 31, 2017

Related
- Closet Secrets

Let's Go Dating (Chinese: 我们去相亲) is a variety programme produced by The Moving Visuals Co. for Mediacorp Channel 8. It is hosted by a rotating team of presenters composed of two from a team of the four hosts Youyi, Wang Weiliang, Tosh Zhang and Teddy Tang.

== See also ==
- Mediacorp Channel 8
