= Wesley Wong =

Hong Kong actor

- 黃愷傑
- Born: 7 January 1987 (age 39); British Hong Kong
- Education: University of Southern California; Beijing Film Academy
- Occupations: Actor; Singer
- Years active: 2013–present
- Height: 1.78 m (5 ft 10 in)
- Mother: Angie Chiu

Chinese name
- Traditional Chinese: 黃愷傑
- Simplified Chinese: 黄恺杰
Transcriptions
Standard Mandarin
- Hanyu Pinyin: Huáng Kǎijié
Yue: Cantonese
- Jyutping: wong^{4} hoi^{2}git^{6}

Wesley Wong (Chinese: 黃愷傑; born 7 January 1987) is a Hong Kong actor and singer.

== Background ==
His father is Melvin Wong, and his mother is Angie Chiu, both are Hong Kong TVB stars. His mother is famous for her elegance and femininity that does not age, and also has two other sons from her previous marriage.

Wesley Wong received his Bachelor's degree in Business Administration at University of Southern California and Master's degree in Acting at Beijing Film Academy.

== Personal life ==
Wong married Chinese actress Tang Chang (汤畅) in 2025.

== Filmography ==
=== Film ===
Year	Title	Role
2013	Sorry, I Love You	Trey
2015	Ah Boys to Men 3: Frogmen	Hei Long Shek Hak Long
2015	Massagist	
2018	Pacific Rim: Uprising	Ou-Yang Jinhai
