= My Love Sinema =

- Directed by: Tan Ai Leng
- Produced by: Irene Ang
- Starring: Tosh Zhang; Cheryl Wee; Jeff Wang
- Production company: FLY Entertainment
- Release date: 8 September 2016
- Running time: 92 minutes
- Country: Singapore
- Language: Mandarin
- Budget: $1.5 million

My Love Sinema (Chinese: 放映爱), is a 2016 Singaporean drama film directed by Tan Ai Leng. The film is set in the 1950s, and later transitions to modern day.

== Plot ==
Twenty-year-old Kheong moves from a Malay kampung to Singapore to train as a film projectionist. There, he meets Wei, a young Chinese teacher and a leftist radical. He soon falls in love with her.

== Cast ==
- Tosh Zhang as Kheong
- Cheryl Wee as Wei
- Jeff Wang as Brother Lee
- Zen Chong
- Nora Miao
- Cherry Ngan

== Release ==
The film was originally meant to be released on 29 August 2016. The film released in theatres in Singapore on 8 September. It was also screened in Japan on 8 September. The film was released in theatres in Japan on 8 September.

== Reception ==
John Lui of The Straits Times rated the film two-and-a-half stars out of five, praising the part of the film set in the 1950s, while criticising the third act, writing "In a third-act blunder, the movie lurches forward in time to a mind-numbingly hysterical set of events in the present day, filled with silly coincidences and overstuffed bits in which as many actors as possible say as many lines as possible." Luo Yingling rated the film two stars out of five, criticising the acting.
