= Kenny Yap =

Kenny Yap Kim Lee
- 叶金利
- Education: Singapore Polytechnic; Ohio State University
- Occupation: Business executive
- Employer: Qian Hu Corporation
- Known for: Qian Hu Corporation
- Title: Executive Chairman
- Awards: Singapore Youth Award for Entrepreneurship (1998); International Management Action Award (2000); 50 Stars of Asia (2001); Yazhou Zhoukan Young Chinese Entrepreneur Award (2002); Ernst & Young Services Entrepreneur Award (2003)

Kenny Yap Kim Lee (Chinese: 叶金利; pinyin: Yè Jīnlì), popularly known as “Kenny the Fish”, is the executive chairman of Qian Hu Corporation, an ornamental fish specialist company founded in Singapore.

Yap was conferred the Singapore Youth Award for Entrepreneurship in 1998. He also received Spring Singapore’s International Management Action Award 2000. He was named one of the 50 stars of Asia by Business Week in 2001, and went on to receive the Yazhou Zhoukan Young Chinese Entrepreneur Award 2002 and the Ernst & Young Services Entrepreneur Award 2003, among other accolades.

== Education ==
Yap graduated with a Diploma in Mechanical Engineering from Singapore Polytechnic in 1985. He later graduated from Ohio State University with a 1st Class Honours degree in Business Administration.

== Career ==
Reflecting on his family's early challenges in fish-farming, including the death of thousands of expensive tropical fish, Yap told Forbes in 2010: "We basically had no idea what we were doing." That was when the family was starting out in fish-farming 25 years earlier.

By 2010, the Qian Hu Corp, of which Yap was the executive chairman, was one of the biggest exporters of tropical fish in the world and operated a dozen stores around Asia.

== Quote ==
- "We knew that we were small fish. Small fish have to swim together to survive. Without my four brothers and two cousins, I don’t think there would be a Kenny Yap." — Kenny Yap
