= Noah Yap =

Singaporean actor and singer

- Born: Noah Yap Rong Yew; 4 November 1993 (age 32); Singapore
- Occupations: Actor, singer
- Years active: 2012–present

Chinese name
- Traditional Chinese: 葉榮耀
- Simplified Chinese: 叶荣耀
Transcriptions
Standard Mandarin
- Hanyu Pinyin: Yè Róng Yào

Noah Yap Rong Yew (born 4 November 1993) is a Singaporean actor and singer.

== Early life & Education ==
Noah Yap was born to Tony Yap, a sports facilities construction firm owner, and Alice Ong Cheng Hui on 4 November 1993. Coming from a Christian family, Noah was given his biblical name, as he was born premature. He has a brother named Sean. Yap completed his secondary education at Bendemeer Secondary School and quit studying theatre studies at Nanyang Academy of Fine Arts in 2013 to pursue his acting career which started in 2012.

== Career ==
Yap's entertainment career got kickstarted in 2012 when he appeared in Ah Boys to Men and started his YouTube channel. In the first Ah Boys to Men movie, he played a recruit, IP Man whose girlfriend broke up with him while he undergoes the three-month basic military training. Yap would continue to reprise the character in the subsequent sequels and the musical in the franchise.

In 2014, Yap enlisted in Singapore Armed Forces. Unlike his character in the Ah Boys to Men series, he suffers from asthma and was unable to serve his national service in a combat role. He eventually auditioned into the Music and Drama Company as an emcee. Sometime in 2015, Yap was arrested by the military police on suspicions of drug consumption. MDC took him out from his shows for eight months. On 2 March 2016, Yap was sent to the detention barracks for the consumption of cannabis.

After his sentence was served and on completion of his national service obligations, he partook in his agency's, Fly Entertainment's anti-drug campaign.

== Filmography ==
=== Film ===
Year	Title	Role	Notes	Ref
2012	Ah Boys to Men	Recruit In Ping a.k.a. IP Man		
2013	Ah Boys to Men 2	Recruit In Ping a.k.a. IP Man		
2014	The Lion Men	Zhang Bu Da		
2014	The Lion Men: Ultimate Showdown	Zhang Bu Da		
2017	Ah Boys to Men 4	Corporal First Class In Ping a.k.a. IP Man		
2018	23:59: The Haunting Hour	Recruit Tan		
2018	Wonderful! Liang Xi Mei	Kidnapper		
2025	We Can Save The World!!!	Ryan		

=== Television ===
Year	Title	Role	Notes	Ref
2014	World at Your Feet	Guang Huo		
2018	Happy Can Already! 4	Recruit		
2019	Kin (TV series)	Rickson Ang		
2022	I Want to be a Tow Kay	Lau Qing Han 流冷汗		
2022	Genie in a Cup	Zhou Runfa 周潤發		
2022	Love at First Bite	Gordon		

=== Theatre ===
Year	Title	Role	Notes	Ref
2014	Ah Boys to Men: The Musical	In Ping a.k.a. IP Man		
