= The Lion Men =

The Lion Men 狮神决战
- Theatrical release poster
- Directed by: Jack Neo
- Written by: Jack Neo
- Produced by: Thum
- Starring: Tosh Zhang; Wang Weiliang; Eva Cheng; Noah Yap; Charlie Goh; Maxi Lim; Chen Tianwen; Zhang Xinxiang; Jaspers Lai; Bunz Bao; Rao Zi Jie; Celyn Liew
- Cinematography: Ardy Lam
- Edited by: Yim Mun Chong
- Music by: Mo Ju Li
- Production companies: J Team Productions mm2 Entertainment
- Distributed by: Shaw Organisation
- Release date: 30 January 2014
- Running time: 130 minutes
- Country: Singapore
- Languages: Mandarin; Hokkien; English
- Box office: US$1,668,380

The Lion Men (Chinese: 狮神决战) is a Singapore action comedy film directed by Jack Neo and starring Tosh Zhang, Wang Weiliang, Eva Cheng, Noah Yap, Charlie Goh, Maxi Lim, Chen Tianwen, Zhang Xinxiang, Jaspers Lai, Bunz Bao, Rao Zi Jie and Celyn Liew. The main plot revolves around three lion dance troupes pitting themselves against one another. It also marks the third on-screen reunion of Maxi Lim, Noah Yap, Wang Weiliang, Tosh Zhang, Charlie Goh and Chen Tianwen after their first and second collaborations together in Neo's previous movies Ah Boys to Men and Ah Boys to Men 2.

== Plot ==
Shi Shen is the top performer in the Tiger Crane Lion Dance Association, but feels restricted by Master He's traditional mindset. He decides to take a group of disciples and forms his own lion dance troupe known as Storm Riders, which fuses hip hop and rock with lion dance movements.

A major Lion Dance Competition is coming up and Mikey is groomed to be Shi Shen's successor. However, he has a huge fear of heights. The situation worsens when both Shi Shen and Mikey fall for Master He's daughter named He Xiao Yu.

== Cast ==
- Tosh Zhang as Shi Shen/Supreme
- Wang Weiliang as Mikey
- Eva Cheng as He Xiao Yu, Master He's daughter
- Noah Yap as Zhang Bu Da
- Charlie Goh as Ah Qiang
- Maxi Lim as Babyface
- Chen Tianwen as Master He, the Head Master of Tiger Crane Lion Dance Association
- Zhang Xinxiang as the Director of Flying Clouds Lion Dance Academy, later became Master of Storm Riders
- Jaspers Lai as Sam, the Leader of Black Hawk Lion Dance Troupe
- Bunz Bao as Xiao Wang Zi one shi shen followers and best friends of shi shen and Tiger Crane
- Rao Zi Jie as Tommy
- Celyn Liew as Bing
- Vincent Tee as the Head Master of Black Hawk Lion Dance

Troupe

- Zachary tiong
- Muneera Sheenaz as Coco
- Keelin Tan
- Aden Tan
- Yap Huixin as
- Yutaki ong
- Hellven Chua
- Hanrey Low
- Irwin Fua
- Veracia Yong
- Rovin S/O Rajenthran
- Md Shabil Samsul

== Production ==
Development of this film was first announced in June 2013 as an untitled project hailed as the "breakthrough action movie" of director Jack Neo. In August 2013, the film's title was revealed during its opening ceremony, with Neo adding that he had been thinking of such a film premise for "quite some time ago". The budget of the film is estimated to be around $4 million. To prepare for the film, the stars had to undergo real life lion dancing training sessions.

== Release ==
The film was released on 30 January 2014, during the Chinese New Year's Eve.
