= Wang Weiliang =

Singaporean comedian (born 1987)

- Born: 11 October 1987 (age 39); Singapore
- Education: Montfort Secondary School
- Occupations: Comedian; host; actor; singer; businessman
- Agent: Fly Entertainment
- Musical career
- Also known as: Lobang
- Genres: Hokkien pop; Mandopop
- Instrument: Vocals

Chinese name
- Traditional Chinese: 王偉良
- Simplified Chinese: 王伟良
- Hanyu Pinyin: Wáng Wěiliáng

Wang Weiliang (born 11 October 1987) is a Singaporean comedian, host, actor, singer and businessman. A getai performer-turned-actor, Wang grew prominence with the box-office successes of the Ah Boys to Men film series by director Jack Neo.

== Early life ==
At 14, he dropped out of Montfort Secondary School to help with his family's household expenditure. A former teen gangster, his previous jobs included pasar malam hawker and alarm clock salesman.

He served national service as a storeman in 4 SIR (4th Battalion, Singapore Infantry Regiment).

Wang said the main reason he is in the showbiz is because of his mother. He said: "My mother is like my girlfriend. We are very close. I'm still standing on stage today because of the pride I see on her face. I relish it. I fell wayward for 10 years, and she took care of me all those 10 years. I told myself I would never break her heart again because, no matter what I'd done wrong in the past, my mother would still say, 'you are still my son.'"

== Career ==
Speaking predominantly in Hokkien and Mandarin, Wang debuted as a getai singer in 2009 before trying his hand as a getai host in 2011, after local veteran getai performer and mentor Wang Lei gave him a stage costume.

In 2012, he was picked to star in Ah Boys to Men as the street smart Bang "Lobang" Lee Onn by director Jack Neo, and has gained popularity and fame due to its success. He also starred in and sang the original soundtrack "牵着我" for The Lion Men (2014), another Singaporean action movie also directed by Jack Neo.

In 2014, he received rave reviews for reprising his role as the street-smart recruit Bang "Lobang" Lee Onn in Ah Boys to Men: The Musical.

== Business venture ==
In May 2023, Wang opened a music school named Seed Music at Pearl Hill.

== Filmography ==
=== Film ===
Year	Title	Role	Notes
2012	Ah Boys to Men	Recruit Bang "Lobang" Lee Onn	
2013	Ah Boys to Men 2	Recruit Bang "Lobang" Lee Onn	
2014	The Lion Men	Mikey	
2014	The Lion Men: Ultimate Showdown	Mikey	
2015	Ah Boys to Men 3: Frogmen	3SG Bang "Lobang" Lee Onn (aka Lobang)	
2016	Long Long Time Ago	Corporal Bang "Lobang" Lee Onn	Cameo
2017	Lucky Boy	Lin Yu	
2017	Ah Boys to Men 4	CFC Bang "Lobang" Lee Onn	

=== Television series ===
Year	Title	Role	Notes
2014	World at Your Feet	Ah Liang	Special appearance
2020	It's All Your Fault!	Li Zhiping	
2023	The Landlady Singer	A-wei	

=== Variety and reality shows ===
Year	Title	Notes
2015	The Getai Challenge	Host
2015	Mission S-change	Host
2016	BENGpire	Host
2017	Let's Go Dating	Host
2020	Songs We Love	Special guest

== Theatre ==
Year	Title	Role
2014	Ah Boys to Men: The Musical	Bang "Lobang" Lee Onn

== Awards and nominations ==
Year	Ceremony	Award	Nominated work	Result
2018	Star Awards	Top 10 Most Popular Male Artistes	—N/a	Nominated
