= Ah Boys to Men 3: Frogmen =

- Theatrical release poster
- Directed by: Jack Neo
- Written by: Jack Neo; Ivan Ho
- Produced by: Ong Thiam Seng
- Starring: Wang Weiliang; Maxi Lim; Joshua Tan; Charlie Goh; Tosh Zhang; Jaspers Lai; Wesley Wong
- Cinematography: Xu Ji Wei
- Edited by: Yim Mun Chong
- Music by: Zheng Kai Hua; Matthew Teng
- Production companies: J Team Productions mm2 Entertainment
- Distributed by: Golden Village Pictures
- Release date: 19 February 2015
- Running time: 148 minutes
- Country: Singapore
- Languages: English; Mandarin; Cantonese; Hokkien
- Budget: $2.85 million
- Box office: $7.8 million

Ah Boys to Men 3: Frogmen (simplified Chinese: 新兵正传III：蛙人传; traditional Chinese: 新兵正傳III：蛙人傳; pinyin: Xīnbīng Zhèngzhuàn III: Wārénzhuàn; literally: "Recruits' True Biography") is a 2015 Singaporean military comedy film produced and directed by Jack Neo. It stars Wang Weiliang, Maxi Lim, Joshua Tan, Charlie Goh, Tosh Zhang, Jaspers Lai and Wesley Wong in the third installment. It was released in cinemas on 19 February 2015. The film raked in $2.83 million at the box office within four days, making it the first Asian film with the highest ever box office takings in its opening weekend in Singapore.

== Plot ==
The film explores what might have happened when the boys have been assigned to Singapore's Naval Diving Unit (NDU). The movie offers a peek into the intensive training regime of the NDU, which had never been revealed so far. Together, the boys must survive 40 weeks of intensive training to become Frogmen, one of Singapore's most elite military units.

== Cast ==
- Wang Weiliang as 3SG Bang "Lobang" Lee Onn
- Maxi Lim as 3SG Aloysius Jin aka Wayang King
- Joshua Tan as 3SG Ken Chow
- Charlie Goh as CPL Tan Wei Ming
- Tosh Zhang as 3WO Alex Ong
- Jaspers Lai as CPL Handsome
- Wesley Wong as 3SG Shek Hak Long aka Hei Long
- Bunz Bao as CPL Sam Hui
- Hanrey Low as CPL Henry
- Justin Dominic Misson as 2WO Lum Ber Toh, B T Lum aka No. 2
- Fish Chaar as CPT Max Chow
- Gadrick Chin as Sha Bao 傻豹
- Joey Leong as Lo Wei 罗薇, Lobang's sister
- Richard Low as Ken's father
- Irene Ang as Mary Chow, Ken's mother
- Yoo Ah Min as Ken's grandmother
- Wang Lei as Ken's uncle
- Aileen Tan as Lobang's mother
- Hayley Woo as Amy, Ken's girlfriend
- Chen Tianwen as Mr. Jin, Aloysius' father
- Ye Li Mei as Mrs. Jin, Aloysius' mother
- COL Tan Hong Teck as himself, Commanding Officer of Naval Diving Unit (Cameo)
- Yung Raja

== Production ==
The film was shot at the Naval Diving Unit in Sembawang Camp.

=== Music ===
The official theme song of the film titled "Who Else", was written, composed and performed by Tosh Zhang, a YouTube personality who is part of the cast in the film. An official music video was uploaded on YouTube on 4 February 2015.

The OST of the film, titled "Why Me", was uploaded on YouTube on 16 May 2015.

== Reception ==
The film grossed $2.8 million on its opening weekend and became the highest grossing opening weekend for an Asian movie title in Singapore.
