= Low Kay Hwa =

Singaporean novelist (born 1985)

Low Kay Hwa (born June 18, 1985) is a Singaporean novelist known for his teen romance novels. He also runs a lifestyle page for Singaporeans.

== Biography ==
Low Kay Hwa has studied in Boon Lay Primary School, Hong Kah Secondary School and Singapore Polytechnic, and he is pursuing his B.A. in English and literature from SIM University on a part-time basis.

Low published his first novel in 2003, and set up his own publishing company in 2005. He has published 12 novels. His novel A Singapore Love Story made it to Singapore's Sunday Times bestsellers lists.

== Works ==
- Destiny’s Cries (2004, The Word Press) ISBN 9810495323
- I Believe You (2005, 2012, Goody Books) ISBN 9789810536206 ISBN 9789810725822
- You Are Here (2006, Goody Books) ISBN 9810553366
- Journey (2006, 2012, Goody Books) ISBN 9789810564032 ISBN 9789810725839
- A Photogenic Life (2007, 2012, Goody Books) ISBN 9789810586874 ISBN 9789810725846
- To Forget You (2008, 2012, Goody Books) ISBN 9789810813079 ISBN 9789810725853
- Lilith (2009, 2012, Goody Books) ISBN 9789810836887 ISBN 9789810725860
- The Perfect Story (2010, 2012, Goody Books) ISBN 9789810868956 ISBN 9789810725877
- For That Day (2011, Goody Books) ISBN 9789810885229
- A Singapore Love Story (2011, Goody Books) ISBN 9789810700621
- I (2011, 2013, Goody Books) ISBN 9789810757526
- Today or Tomorrow (2014, Goody Books) ISBN 9810795769
