= Ah Boys to Men =

2012 Singaporean film by Jack Neo

- Theatrical release poster
- Directed by: Jack Neo
- Written by: Jack Neo; Link Sng
- Produced by: Leonard Lai; Jack Neo; Lim Teck
- Starring: Joshua Tan; Maxi Lim; Noah Yap; Wang Weiliang; Ridhwan Azman; Aizuddiin Nasser; Charlie Goh; Tosh Zhang
- Cinematography: Ardy Lam; Chiu Wai Yin; Amandi Wong
- Music by: Mo Ju Li
- Production companies: J Team Productions mm2 Entertainment
- Distributed by: Golden Village Pictures; Clover Films
- Release date: 8 November 2012; (Singapore)
- Running time: 110 minutes
- Country: Singapore
- Languages: English; Mandarin; Hokkien
- Budget: S$3 million (shared with Ah Boys to Men 2)
- Box office: S$6.18 million US$5,088,413

Ah Boys to Men (Chinese: 新兵正传; pinyin: Xīnbīng Zhèngzhuàn; lit. 'Recruits' True Biography') is a 2012 Singaporean military comedy film produced and directed by Jack Neo and co-written with Link Sng. It is the first installment of the Ah Boys to Men series, and stars Joshua Tan, Maxi Lim, Noah Yap, Wang Weiliang, Ridhwan Azman, Aizuddiin Nasser, Charlie Goh, and Tosh Zhang.

Commissioned by the Ministry of Defence (MINDEF) to commemorate the 45th anniversary of National Service, the film centers around a group of young army recruits under National service in Singapore. The film was co-produced by J Team Productions and mm2 Entertainment. It was Neo's first military-themed feature and the first major Singaporean military comedy since Ong Keng Sen's film Army Daze (1996). Ah Boys to Men premiered in Singapore on 8 November 2012, where it grossed a record S$6.18 million, and became Singapore's highest-grossing film until being surpassed by its sequel, Ah Boys to Men 2, in 2013.

While reviews were mixed, the film was praised for its cast performances and its authentic portrayal of National Service, though its writing and involvement of product placement drew criticism. Its strong box-office run helped build the Ah Boys to Men franchise, a series of works that contributed to the Singapore Film Society honoring Neo with its Lifetime Achievement Award in January 2026.

== Plot ==
The film opens with Singapore under a massive invasion by an unidentified foreign power, featuring airstrikes on major landmarks such as the Merlion and the Esplanade, alongside numerous civilian casualties. This sequence is subsequently revealed to be a video game played by Ken Chow, a spoiled teenager reluctant to undergo National Service. Ken intends to study abroad with his girlfriend, Amy, but his plans are halted by upcoming conscription. After being chided by Amy for his childishness, Ken vents his anger on a nearby rubbish bin. This leads to his apprehension by two nearby policemen, to Amy's embarrassment and dismay.

His parents bail him out at the police station. Back at home, Ken confesses his anxiety regarding National Service to his parents. His overprotective mother attempts to secure a deferment for him, but her efforts fail. The Chow family bids him farewell on his day of enlistment. Ken and fellow recruits are subsequently assigned to Ninja Company, Platoon 2, Section 2, where they report to their platoon sergeant, Alex Ong. Whilst queueing up for the mandatory haircut, Ken meets some of his fellow recruits—"Lobang", a charismatic ah beng; Aloysius Jin Sia-lan, an educated fellow who intends to be admitted to the Officer Cadet School and become a military officer; and "IP Man", another ah beng concerned that conscription will cause his girlfriend to break up with him. Afterwards, Ken and fellow recruits are shown making simple and goofy mistakes in their initial training.

After two weeks of training, Ken and his peers are permitted to book out (Note: Military lingo for recruits being allowed to leave camp for a weekend break) for the first time. His family hosts a lavish homecoming party, but Ken's mood sours upon seeing a photograph of Amy with another man. He angrily demands a meeting, which she does not initially agree to. During their eventual meeting, she confesses to falling for someone else and breaks up with him by the side of a highway. Convinced that Amy is merely testing him and determined to win her back, Ken plots an escape from Pulau Tekong. He attempts to induce a heat injury that would secure ten days of medical leave by dousing himself in cold water, sleeping under a ceiling fan, and deliberately stopping water intake during hot-weather training. However, he develops hyperthermia and collapses. His condition deteriorates rapidly, requiring an emergency evacuation to Singapore General Hospital.

During the meeting, Ken's father is alerted to his son's condition. He drives to the hospital in a rush, but severe stress triggers a stroke, leading to a vehicular collision. Ken awakens in the hospital, surrounded by his sisters. Overcome with guilt after realizing that his reckless actions have caused a serious accident, he is unable to face his father, who survived the crash and is recovering in a nearby ward. After his recovery, Ken returns to military training. The film concludes with a transition to preview snippets for the sequel, Ah Boys to Men 2.

== Cast ==
- Joshua Tan as REC Ken Chow
- Maxi Lim as REC Aloysius Jin Sia-lan
- Wang Weiliang as REC Bang "Lobang" Lee Onn
- Noah Yap as REC Man In Ping, known as IP Man
- Ridhwan Azman as REC Ismail Mohammed
- Aizuddiin Nasser as REC Muthu Shanmugaratnam
- Charlie Goh as REC Tan Wei Ming
- Tosh Zhang as 2SG Alex Ong, Platoon Sergeant of Ninja Company
- Luke Lee as 3SG Jed Heng, Section Commander of Ninja Company
- Richard Low as Ken's father
- Irene Ang as Mary Chow, Ken's mother
- Qiu Qiu as Amy, Ken's girlfriend
- Chen Tianwen as Mr. Jin, Aloysius' father

== Production ==
Ah Boys to Men is Jack Neo's first military-themed film. Neo served as director and co-wrote the script with Link Sng. Neo, Lim Teck, and Leonard Lai served as producers. Meanwhile, Irene Kng, Neo's wife, served as executive producer.

=== Development ===
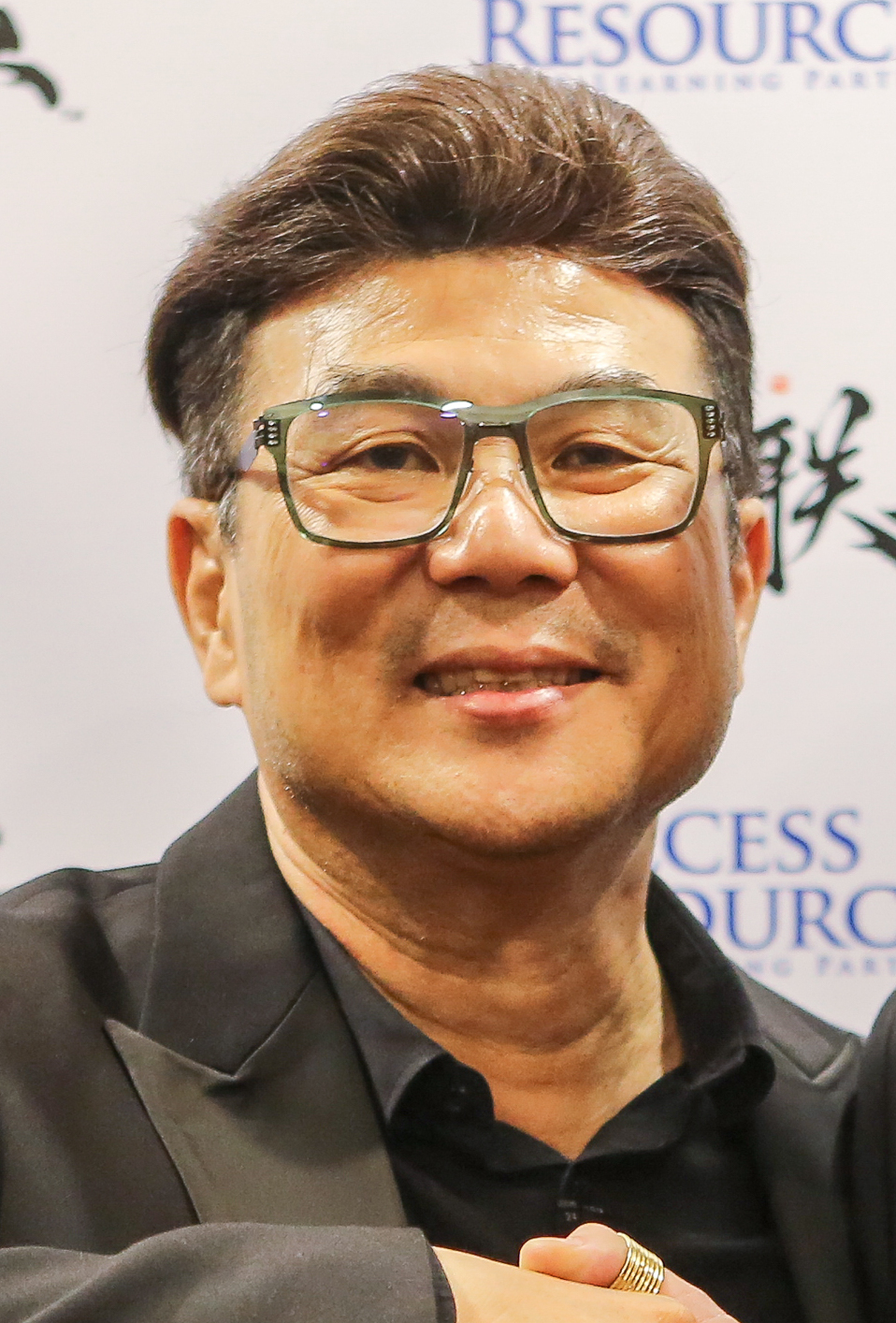
Director Jack Neo

Ah Boys to Men and its sequel Ah Boys to Men 2 were developed as a single unified project. The production team decided to split the film into two parts after distributors advised keeping each feature around 100 minutes long to avoid increased expenditure and scheduling complications. Both films shared a budget of S$3 million.

The project started in 2012 when the Ministry of Defence (MINDEF) approached Neo to adapt the documentary series Every Singaporean Son for the 45th anniversary of National Service (NS). Following two and a half months of research, Neo proposed an original fictional feature instead of a direct adaptation, aiming to offer a realistic depiction of NS not seen on screen since Army Daze (1996). He had wanted to direct a military-themed film since his own time as a recruit in the 1970s, but had previously been unable to find the right opportunity.

Funding was secured through the Media Development Authority's Production Assistance grant, and by several investors and sponsors such as Toast Box, Bee Cheng Hiang, and KPMG. Because Neo did not receive direct funding from MINDEF, the production maintained creative independence, allowing for scenes such as recruits smuggling bakkwa during basic training. Neo stated that MINDEF did not interfere with the script or editing while providing logistical support, including access to military locations, equipment, vehicles, and on-site consultants.

=== Casting ===
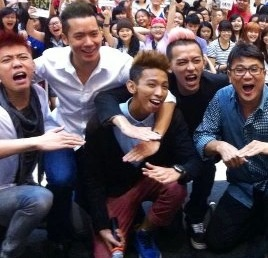
(Left to right) Actors Wang Weiliang, Joshua Tan, Ridhwan Azman, Tosh Zhang, and director Jack Neo at a roadshow in Chinatown

Casting for both films began in March 2012, with casting directors utilizing social media to contact various bloggers and digital personalities for to audition. Managed by JM Artiste Management—a collaboration between mm2 Entertainment and J Team Productions—the process saw at least 500 individuals audition for lead roles. Neo sought out popular bloggers and getai singers to feature them on a new platform.

The final lineup included debut feature performances from rookie actors and digital personalities such as Joshua Tan, Tosh Zhang, Maxi Lim, Noah Yap, Wang Weiliang, Ridhwan Azman, and Charlie Goh. They were supported by veteran actors including Richard Low, Irene Ang, Yoo Ah Min, and Chen Tianwen. Several prominent Singaporean businessmen were also invited to make cameo appearances as reservists in the opening war sequence, including Kenny Yap, executive chairman of Qian Hu Corporation, and Douglas Foo, chairman of Sakae Holdings.

=== Filming and effects ===
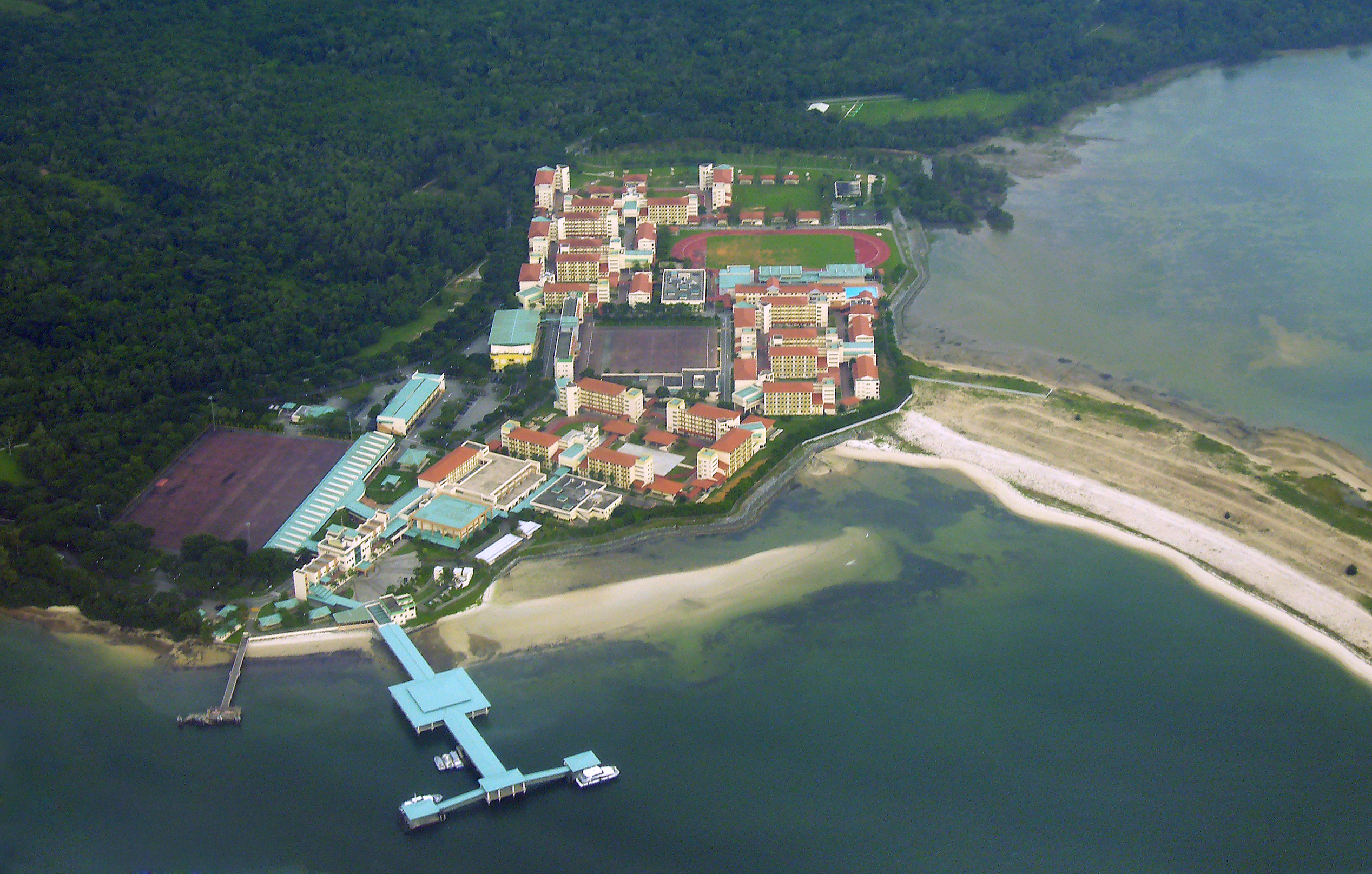
Basic Military Training Centre (BMTC) at Pulau Tekong (pictured in 2011)

Ah Boys to Men and its sequel were shot simultaneously during principal photography from July to September 2012, totalling seventy days. Thirty-five days of filming took place in Pulau Tekong, the site of the Basic Military Training Centre, making Ah Boys to Men the first film permitted to shoot there. The crew also filmed at Sembawang Air Base and Pasir Laba Camp.

Neo noted that recreating the 1970s National Service era was particularly challenging due to the difficulty of sourcing accurate period details such as uniforms, helmets, and Standard Battle Orders (SBO). Because the older designs were obsolete and the MINDEF lacked spare stock, the crew had to scour various locations to find them. For the SBO, the production staff searched shops along Beach Road before finding the last remaining batch of the vintage equipment. To achieve the exact Temasek green colour of the original uniforms, which were completely unavailable, the team purchased new uniforms and repeatedly dyed them until the precise shade was matched. Meanwhile, the helmets were sourced from an Arab Street shop that still had fifty units available, having previously sold the decommissioned gear to durian harvesters in Malaysia for use as protective headwear.

The large-scale war sequences spent a substantial portion of the budget, according to Neo. Spanning ten days of filming, the battle scenes featured numerous extras alongside armed forces fighting aggressors in an HDB complex and the central business district. Computer-generated imagery (CGI) was used to create the explosions for the opening scenes, where various landmarks in Singapore were destroyed, with visual effects handled by Vividthree Productions. Neo insisted on using real weapons and pyrotechnics for the war sequences to provide audiences with a novel experience. He argued, "A lot of people have served in the army before and know what it is like. The only thing audiences have never experienced before is what happens if there is a war in Singapore." He hoped these sequences would set the film apart from previous army-themed movies and prompt reflection on the significance of NS.

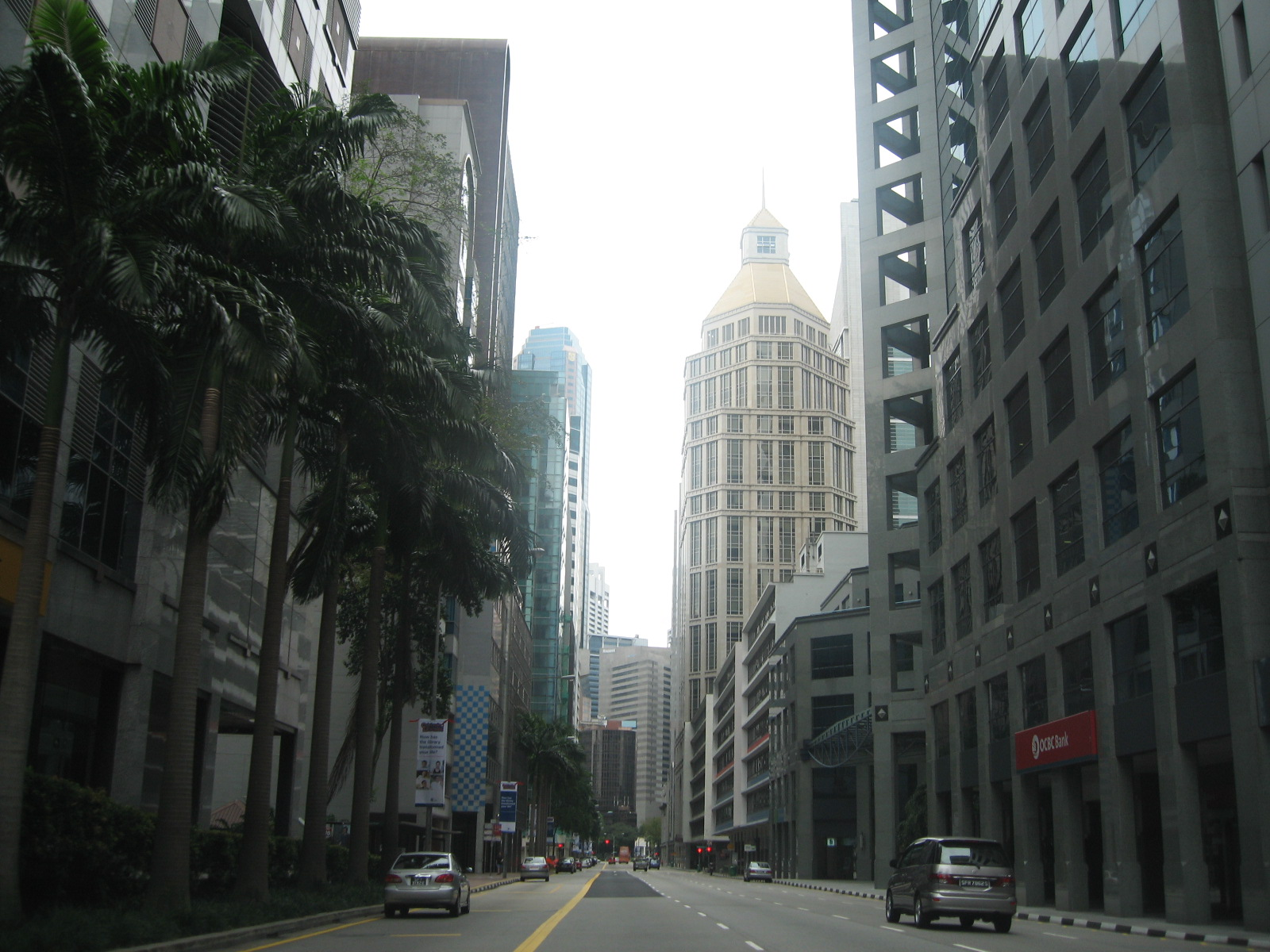
Robinson Road (pictured in 2006) was one of the film's practical locations

Producer Leonard Lai mentioned receiving full support from the Singapore Armed Forces (SAF), including access to their urban training areas with HDB mock-ups to film the war scenes. Robinson Road, located at Singapore's Central Area and financial district, also served as one of the film's practical locations, with an estimated S$100,000 spent filming there. On 19 August 2012, 300 metres (980 ft) segment of the road from Maxwell Road to the McCallum Street intersection was closed to the public for filming. This marked the first time the road was closed for filming. The production staff brought in around 10 tonnes of rubble, two Terrex ICV vehicles, and small explosives, as well as national servicemen and extras. Neo was warned beforehand that destruction of the road would incur fines.

The film features Dolby Atmos surround sound and is the first Asian film to do so. Neo noted that the technology was a good fit because audiences could hear explosions from every corner of the cinema.

=== Music ===
The official theme song, "Recruits' Anthem", was written, composed, and performed by YouTube personality and cast member Tosh Zhang. Written mostly during filming in Pulau Tekong, the track was rejected twice by Neo before being uploaded to YouTube as Ah Boys to Men's official music video on 30 October 2012, where it gained around 500,000 views within a month.

== Release ==
Film distributor Clover Films announced in March 2012 that the film's two parts would be released in late 2012 and 2013 Chinese New Year. A theatrical release of 8 November 2012 was then announced in July. Ah Boys to Men premiered on 6 November 2012 at the Golden Village Multiplex. It was first commercially released in Singapore on 8 November 2012 and in Malaysian cinemas on 20 December 2012. In December, it was announced at the Asia TV Forum & Market and ScreenSingapore 2012 conference that STAR Chinese Movies had acquired pay television rights to Ah Boys to Men in certain territories in Southeast Asia in a deal with Clover Films, one of the film's distributors and production companies, for an undisclosed price. The film and its sequel were showcased at the Hong Kong International Film & TV Market from 18 to 21 March 2013.

== Reception ==
=== Critical response ===
Ah Boys to Men received mixed reviews from critics, who generally praised the cast's performances but criticized the film's inconsistent tone, reliance on stereotypes, and heavy-handed product placement. Some reviewers called Ah Boys to Men as a coming-of-age film, a "personal drama", or a "basic rite of passage". Channel NewsAsia's Han Wei Chou complimented that the film distinguishes itself by tackling situations families with members under service may encounter, such as depicting the parents' reactions on training accidents, and recruits dealing with romantic breakups.

The performances and camaraderie of the rookie cast received positive reception from several reviewers. Critics praised the natural camaraderie among the lead actors, highlighting Wang Weiliang's comic timing. Film Business Asia's Derek Elley praised Irene Ang's depiction of a "domineering" mother and Tosh Zhang's performance as a sarcastic sergeant. In contrast, Hee En Ming of Fridae dismissed the performances as amateurish and criticized the use of recycled musical numbers. Han felt that several characters were flat stereotypes, echoed by The Straits Times's Boon Chan, who singled out the characters of Lobang and Aloysius as rare examples of well-developed roles.

The cultural themes of Ah Boys to Men yielded significant commentary. The film earned support from politician Maliki Osman, who lauded it for strengthening Singaporeans' commitment to national defence by "striking a chord" with the public. The Straits Times' William Choong argued that while the flashbacks and training culture successfully evoked nostalgia for former servicemen, the light treatment of war consequences lacked insight into the battle readiness of the Singapore Armed Forces (SAF). Elley noted that while the opening sequence suggested a high-level satirical comedy aimed at international audiences, the film ultimately pivoted toward Singlish and Hokkien puns tailored specifically to local Singaporean viewers. Several reviewers also targeted the film's uneven tone and abrupt structural shifts. Kwok Kar Peng of The New Paper felt that the opening war sequence shifted anticlimactically into basic training scenes, while Elley argued that the film lost its comic momentum in the second half by devolving into a melodrama and a moral lecture. Boon Chan observed that the film resorted to a "last-minute incident" typical of director Neo's filmography to force a change in Ken's attitude, and argued that decades-old National Service flashbacks unnecessarily bloated the runtime. However, Dylan Tan of The Business Times posited that the added dramatic weight justified the film's split into two parts.

The comedic execution divided reviewers, who found the gags derivative or problematic. Several critics described the jokes as clichéd, noting that military stereotypes like the mother's boy and the "geng king" (Note: Colloquial term for slacker) heavily repeated tropes from 1996 film Army Daze. Hee felt that the movie relied on throwaway gags in place of character-based humour. Cutaway jokes also drew mixed reactions; Today's Christopher Toh found certain sequences—including a fart joke immediately following a dark scene where families are murdered—difficult to laugh at. Furthermore, Choong noted that jokes inserted during the war sequence, alongside the abrupt transition from a soldier sacrificing his life to a computer game, demonstrated a dismissal of the actual brutality of war. Today's Vanessa Tai felt that some of the jokes, although they may accurately portray military life, were misogynistic and could compromise the image of the SAF. They cited a line that refers to women as "clothing that can be easily discarded" to console a recruit, and a segment where a sergeant teaches recruits how to tear a leaf to form the shape of female genitalia. While Gary Chua, also from Today, disagreed with Tai and defended the film as a "perfect salute" to servicemen. Neo stated in response to criticism that such sexist jokes were common within the army.

=== Box office ===
Ah Boys to Men earned S$234,000 on its opening day and became the highest-grossing film in its opening weekend, earning S$1,509,422 at the box office. It broke the record for the biggest opening weekend for a local production, a record previously held by Neo's earlier film Ah Long Pte Ltd (S$1.484 million) in 2008. Ah Boys to Men also achieved the biggest opening-day box-office result for a local film outside of the Chinese New Year season and became the first Asian movie to top the Singapore box office since November 2011. It surpassed S$5 million in earnings on 29 November 2012, becoming only the second Singaporean film to reach that milestone. At that point, it became Singapore's second-highest-grossing local film, overtaking the previous record holder Money No Enough 2 (2008), which was also directed by Neo. On 17 December 2012, Ah Boys to Men became the highest-grossing Singaporean film of all time, having taken in S$6.03 million to surpass the previous record holder Money No Enough (1998), another work of Neo.

Responding to the milestone, Neo said, "I've waited 12 years to be able to make a film that can beat Money No Enough. I'm so glad that the day has finally come." He initially stated that he and the cast would skinny dip to celebrate, though they instead participated in various charity-related events. The film earned around RM2 million in Malaysia by April 2013, and ultimately grossed S$6.18 million. Online box office revenue tracker Box Office Mojo has listed this film as the fifth-highest-grossing film of 2012 in Singapore. The film's sequel released in February 2013, Ah Boys to Men 2, would eventually break its record as the highest-grossing Singaporean film.

=== Impact ===
In an interview with Cinema Online, Jack Neo described the Ah Boys to Men duology as "a miracle" for himself and his team. The film served as the starting point for the Ah Boys to Men franchise, a series of works that contributed to the Singapore Film Society honoring the filmmaker with its Lifetime Achievement Award on 2 January 2026.

The film served as a career milestone and a breakthrough for several cast members, establishing them as actors and surging their popularity to the point where "getting mobbed by passionate fans has become part of their everyday life." Several cast members went on to become Neo's frequent collaborators, returning for future installments in the franchise. A musical theatre adaptation of Ah Boys to Men and its sequel ran in April 2014, featuring several members of the original cast.

== Themes ==
The central theme of this film is National Service in Singapore, a popular topic amongst Singaporeans. It is meant to commemorate the 45th anniversary of Singapore's NS in conjunction with MINDEF's campaign that year, From Fathers to Sons. Director Neo stated that the narrative revolves around camaraderie and family. Through a father and son relationship, the film presents two contrasting attitudes toward NS, a distinction that Dylan Tan suggested may set the film apart from the official messaging of the official campaign. Derek Elley of Film Business Asia further argued that NS operates in the film as a metaphor for the strictures of everyday life in Singapore.

While other works by Neo subtly critique local social issues, scholars Chang and Ho noted that Ah Boys to Men presents the Singapore Armed Forces favourably. They also described in their essay on civil-military relations in Asia that the film's production demonstrates the Singaporean military's cooperative relationship with civilian institutions. Likewise, Stephen Teo explained that the film reflects Neo's filmmaking approach of critiquing the city-state system as an insider and beneficiary. Teo argued that in his film, Neo depicts NS positively as an institution while offering social critique. The film also dipped into culture of taking advantage of the system, such as faking illness to avoid training.

In Ah Boys to Men, Singaporean recruits from various ethnic backgrounds build camaraderie during NS. Nasir and Turner wrote in their book chapter on NS, that film presents NS as a rite of passage that teaches the "norms of being a well-adjusted citizen." They also noted that themes of independence, masculinity, and loyalty are shared with Army Daze, another Singaporean film with similar premise. Chia-Yuan Huang explained in their paper that the film's narrative emphasizes NS as a source of multiethnic unity. Moreover, the support from MINDEF and the Media Development Authority demonstrates an exercise of "soft governance" that highlights cultural differences framed within a national narrative of harmony. Meanwhile, John Lowe posited in the Asian Studies Review that through the opening sequence, the film proposes by tapping on Asian values that conscription is necessary to protect and maintain Singapore's developed economy. This interpretation implied that the survival of Singapore relies on the state's paternalistic rule, while also framing NS as a sacrifice that masculinizes conscripts and constructs nationalism.
