= Mm2 Entertainment =

Singaporean film production company

- Type: Public
- Industry: Concert Production, Digital News, Movie Production, Cinema
- Founded: 2008
- Headquarters: Singapore
- Area served: Singapore; Malaysia; Taiwan; Hong Kong; China
- Key people: Melvin Ang (Founder, Executive Chairman); Chang Long Jong (Chief Executive Officer)
- Subsidiaries: UnUsUal Productions; mmCineplexes; Vividthree Productions; Dick Lee Asia
- Website: www.mm2entertainment.com

mm2 Entertainment is a regional film studio, production, and distribution company, headquartered in Singapore. In Singapore, it is best known for local movies such as the Ah Boys to Men, The Lion Men, and Long Long Time Ago series. The studio has a presence in Hong Kong (mm2 Hong Kong), Taipei, Shanghai, Beijing, and the United States.

mm2 Entertainment is a wholly owned subsidiary of Singapore-listed media conglomerate mm2 Asia Ltd. The content production, distribution and sponsorship business is listed as mm2 Asia's Core Content Business, with its other business pillars listed as Post and Digital Content Production (under Vividthree Holdings), Cinema operations (under mmCineplexes), and Concert & Events (under UnUsUaL Limited).

== History ==
mm2 Entertainment was founded in Malaysia in 2008 to produce and distribute Chinese-language content for Malaysian consumers. The company subsequently shifted its headquarters to Singapore, and currently has production and distribution presence in Hong Kong, Taiwan, mainland China.

In December 2014, mm2 Entertainment launched an initial public offering under the name mm2 Asia Ltd (SGX:1B0) on the Singapore Exchange's Catalist board with a placement of 37.4 million shares at $0.25 each. At the placing price, the company would be valued at $51.8 million (US$39.9 million), with a 19 time multiple of its 2013-14 net earnings, which were reported as $2.7 million.

On 7 August 2017, trading of mm2 Asia Ltd stock was transferred to the Singapore Exchange mainboard.

== Singapore Productions ==
=== Film ===
- 2010 Old Cow vs Tender Grass
- 2010 Phua Chu Kang The Movie
- 2010 Love Cuts
- 2011 The Ghosts Must Be Crazy
- 2011 The Ultimate Winner
- 2011 Perfect Rivals
- 2011 Twisted
- 2011 23:59
- 2011 Already Famous
- 2012 We Not Naughty
- 2012 Greedy Ghost
- 2012 Imperfect
- 2012 My Dog Dou Dou
- 2012 Ah Boys to Men
- 2013 Ah Boys to Men 2
- 2013 Ghost Child
- 2013 Judgment Day
- 2013 That Girl in Pinafore
- 2013 Everybody's Business
- 2014 The Lion Men
- 2014 The Lion Men: Ultimate Showdown
- 2014 The Transcend
- 2014 Seventh
- 2014 Wayang Boy
- 2014 Behind The Scene
- 2015 Bring Back The Dead
- 2015 Ah Boys to Men 3: Frogmen
- 2015 1965
- 2015 3688
- 2015 Mr. Unbelievable
- 2016 Long Long Time Ago
- 2016 Long Long Time Ago 2
- 2016 My Love Sinema
- 2016 4 Love
- 2017 The Fortune Handbook
- 2017 Take 2
- 2017 Goodbye Mr Loser
- 2017 Lucky Boy
- 2017 Wonder Boy
- 2017 Ah Boys to Men 4
- 2018 The Big Day
- 2018 23:59: The Haunted Hour
- 2018 Zombiepura
- 2019 A Journey of Happiness
- 2020 Precious Is the Night
- 2020 Number 1
- 2020 The Diam Diam Era
- 2021 The Diam Diam Era Two
- 2022 Ah Girls Go Army
- 2023 Circle Line
- 2023 The King of Musang King
- 2024 Money No Enough 3
- 2024 I Not Stupid 3
