= Huang Qing Yuan =

Singaporean singer

Huang Qing Yuan 黃清元
- Born: Huang Qiming (黄啟明); 23 July 1945 (age 80); Singapore
- Origin: Singapore
- Occupation: Singer
- Years active: 1960s–present

Huang Qing Yuan (黃清元, born 23 July 1945) Originally named Huang Qiming (黄啟明), he is a famous Singaporean singer who started singing in the 1960s. He was also known as the 'Elvis of Singapore'.

Huang started singing at age 7 when he joined a children's singing competition which he won and received two cans of soda as the prize.

In 1958, Huang joined Rediffusion Singapore's amateur singing competition and emerged runner-up, winning $150.

In 1965, Huang won the Mandarin category of Singapore's Talent Time. In 1966, he debuted his first vinyl record, Emerald Isle In The Mood (绿岛小夜曲). His next album, Man Li (蔓莉), featured the title track of the same name, which topped the charts and brought him widespread recognition.

In 1968, Huang signed with Hoover Records Pte Ltd (福华唱片有限公司) after his previous contract had ended.

He then recorded over 100 EPs and LPs which are still available in Singapore, Malaysia, Indonesia, and more.

At the 2015 Getai Awards, he received a contribution award in honour of his 40 years of getai performance.

== Personal life ==
Huang had two heart operations in the 1980s.
