= Elderly martial arts master =

Stock character

The elderly martial arts master is a mentor/teacher stock character in fiction, especially Wuxia, Chanbara, and other martial arts films. Typically an East Asian male, he is a near-invincible master of the martial arts, despite being advanced in age and presumably having a decrease in physical strength. Often he possesses the rank of sensei and is referred to as such by his student. The elderly master most often teaches either generic kung fu or an exotic style specific to the fictional period. During the films, the master often becomes close with his students, with the master becoming a guardian figure to the trainees, who are, in turn, looked upon as the master's children. Usually, when the master is captured or killed, or an iconic portrait of the deceased master has been desecrated by some villains, the students will take it upon themselves to rescue or avenge their master.

== Personality traits and mannerisms ==
A typical elderly martial arts master spends most of his time meditating in a dojo. The master is typically a serene, calm, sober and reserved old man. He represents the maturity and self-contentment that comes with age, along with the quiet confidence that comes with experience—both of life in general and of the skills and also the ideals and values that he has inherited from the martial arts. To him, his martial art is not just a way to beat people up or to act tough; rather it is—in keeping with the values and ideals generally attached to and associated with the martial arts by the Oriental societies—more a means to positively developing one's personality and way of living to cultivate values such as respect, patience, self-control, discipline and the whole lot. The master is polite towards everyone, even the mischief makers who would misbehave with him sometime in the course of the movie. He always tries to verbally prevent mischief makers or the rival martial artist (who is often young and arrogant and sees the martial arts only as a means to act tough and bully people) as far as he can, and that too politely. Only when he is forced to use his skills and left with no option, he shows how the mischief makers are no match for him—thereby demonstrating how politeness should not be mistaken for weakness. These are shown, for example, by Iroh in the Avatar: The Last Airbender, Mr. Miyagi in the Karate Kid series, Mr. Han in the new Karate Kid, Master Splinter in the Teenage Mutant Ninja Turtles series, or Yoda of Star Wars.

Some elderly masters are gruff and bad-tempered until the student earns their respect. The most well-known are Pai Mei in Kill Bill and Silver Fox in Matching Escort, although the trope originates in representations of Bodhidharma.

In many wuxia films, the elderly master has a villainous counterpart who leads a rival dojo, usually from the Wu Tang Clan. The two masters have a long-standing vendetta stemming from the evil master challenging and being humiliated by the elderly master years earlier. Examples include Hang Tui and Cho in One Armed Boxer or Grandmaster Sun Jung Chi and Yao Feng Lin in Shaolin vs Lama. Less commonly, the elderly master may be a reformed villain who finds redemption by training his protege to slay evildoers. In the anime Dororo, Hyakkimaru's master Doctor Jukei was once the shogun's executioner.

Japanese media often portrays elderly martial arts masters as lecherous. These include Happosai in Ranma 1/2 and Master Roshi in Dragonball.

== Speech ==
The master typically speaks in a very calm and composed manner. In case of the master being East Asian, as is often the case in films, he is invariably given a thick stereotypical Chinese or Japanese accent, and can only speak English without much fluency or speed. His way of speaking takes on a particularly benevolent, patient, affectionate and friend-philosopher-guide tone when he speaks with his disciple. He typically reprimands and/or castigates the protégé in his more "raw" and "immature" stage in a fatherly manner. In most film portrayals, he often controls or restrains his protégé, from getting provoked and retaliating at the "bad boy(s)", and makes the protégé realize that everything has the "right place and time" and that losing control of oneself or giving in to the provocations of the rival or enemy is not like the true martial artist he wants his disciple to become.

His speech is also full of philosophical observations, anecdotes, short parables or insights, that are mostly intended to constantly improve the insight and knowledge of the disciple in the martial arts, and also at times to improve his personality, behavior, moral values, and way of life. In the martial arts film Enter the Dragon, the old master at the beginning of the film is seen taking a walk with the hero played by Bruce Lee, where he tells his best disciple how the latter has succeeded in acquiring an intuitive skill in the art that has gone beyond the mere physical, and how it is his duty now to use that wisely and prudently in life. The master's dialogues with the protégé would often carry short recollection of his own earlier life, his fighting or career experiences, or how he had come upon a particular knowledge or insight.

== Relationship with the protégé ==
Though the master is always the benevolent father-figure, he can be very strict when it comes to the training. He does not give any false hope to the protégé when it comes to training. He makes it very clear that in order to be trained by him, the young man has to be unquestioningly obedient and be ready to bear the pain.

In movies set at the Shaolin Temple such as the Young Hero of Shaolin, the elderly master is usually the abbot who sees the potential of the new student and permits him to train despite the objections of the senior monks.

In the movie Bloodsport, the teenage Frank Dux is treated by the Japanese master Senzo Tanaka in a very fatherly and affectionate manner in general, but the training is rigorous and harsh, and the master never gives any relief or comfort zone to Frank Dux. In the movie Kickboxer, the hero played by Jean-Claude Van Damme is made to kick the palm tree trunk with his bare shins, until he fractures his shin and drops to the ground in agony.

In The Karate Kid, Mr. Miyagi makes Daniel LaRusso (Ralph Macchio) paint the fences and walls, and wipe the floors and the cars, with two specific arm-movements day after day, and only when Mr. Miyagi tests (by mock attacks) and finds that those movements have become spontaneous and unconscious reactions from Daniel, he gives the boy respite from that toil. It was then that Daniel too realizes, why after all his master had made him do that for days—in spite of him becoming tired, aching and fed-up—for those are actually blocking and parrying techniques, which his master by his experience, had ingrained into him without his being aware of it.

In many movies, the hero, after being wronged in some way by the rival gang or fighter, or after having his martial artist brother, or friend, maimed for life (or even killed) by the formidable and vicious fighter, seeks the master out himself with a resolution to take revenge. In such cases, the master is often unwilling at first, and may appear to be so just to test the seriousness and commitment of the protégé. But finally after a few days, he agrees to start training, after he feels the protégé has passed his test. The training imparted is typically harsh and rigorous right from day one, and the master does not care if the hero has bruised and bloodied himself all over. He often administers medicine and pain-relief techniques, which are in many cases seen to be associated skills that such masters possess along with fighting techniques—since oriental martial arts are also closely related and complementary to traditional physio-therapy and healing systems. Yet, in other movies, the protégé does not really have to persuade or coax the master. The master is seen right from the beginning. He and the protégé get to know each other often by a random event.

In Bloodsport, the teenage Frank Dux sees a katana sword through the window of Senzo Tanaka's house, and in his teenage immaturity, decides to steal it with two of his friends. He is caught in the act, by the master and his son who was of the same age as Frank. But the master is gentle and kind to Frank, and instead of seeing that Frank is punished, decides to teach him a long term moral lesson—that such a sword can only be earned through merit, that one cannot be a fighter by stealing it. He talks to Frank's parents about the benefits of martial training and expresses the wish to make Frank his student. That became the beginning of a lasting and close father-son like relationship between Frank and Tanaka, and when Tanaka's son died as a young adult, it was Frank—by then grown into a mature young man, and a soldier in the army and a worthy disciple—whom Tanaka saw as his deserving successor and inheritor of his martial legacy. The training phase of the movie thus ended with a quiet ceremony in which Tanaka was seen handing over his katana to Frank, signifying Frank's success in earning that sword, which he had tried to steal as a young boy, and later by merit and qualification. Frank, too shows the place his master occupies in his life by dedicating his victory in the underground Kumite to him.

In The Karate Kid Part II, there is a touching scene where Daniel LaRusso is seen coming up to the bereaved and tearful Mr. Miyagi, who was sitting alone facing the sea and grieving for his father who had just died. Daniel sits besides him and comforts the old Mr. Miyagi both with words and an arm on his shoulder.

In some movies, the ability of the master to make his protégé rise above the thought of "revenge", and to acquire the moral strength and fortitude to hold himself back from doing to the rival/villain the same thing that the latter once had done to his brother or friend, even in the face of the strongest provocation, is shown very movingly and dramatically. In the Taekwondo classic Best of the Best, featuring some world-renowned martial-artists and a renowned martial arts grandmaster Hee Il Cho, the coach of the American team Frank Couzo (James Earl Jones), prevents the American fighter in the last face-off of the competition, Tommy Lee (Phillip Rhee), from dealing a fatal blow to his Korean opponent Dae Han Park (played by Philip's real-life brother Simon Rhee). Tommy had maimed his opponent and rendered him helpless by disabling his arms and legs, and the Korean could barely keep standing and taking a fighting stance. This was the same man who had cruelly killed his brother in sport combat years ago with excessive brutality. All Tommy had to do was to deal the final maiming or death blow with a powerful kick he had already braced himself for, as the scene of his brother's death flashed through his mind. But Coach Couzo's gentle but strong "No! No!" call from the sidelines helped Tommy avoid repeating the same crime for the sake of revenge and coming down to the level of Dae Han. By doing so, he won over Dae Han with moral strength instead of an eye-for-an-eye revenge, which made Dae Han repent and approach Tommy to hail him and give him his own medal after the fight was over.

Although it is not necessarily a rule or always true, the elder martial arts master is almost always depicted as being childless and unmarried, the character having either never having had a wife or child or having lost both at some point in his life (Mr. Miyagi is a prime example of this). This is often contrasted by the hero having either a very strained relationship with his parents, or often depicted as having no parents at all in the picture. This common ground between the characters, as well as the hard training the hero must go through at the hands of his master, lead to a very close bonding experience between the two, with the master assuming the father-figure role to his young protégé, who in turn becomes a surrogate son to his master. Their mutual enemy, as well as the battles and issues they face throughout the film, help bring them together as the film progresses making the hero ultimately realize that, although his master pushed him hard, he is beloved in the end, having become a son. In turn, when viewing the hero triumph and succeed in his battle, the master experiences a father's pride in his protégé.

Alternatively, the elderly master may be the grandfather of the protege. In movies like Kung Fu Wonderchild or Of Cooks and Kung Fu the old master raised his grandson to avenge his parents.

== Humour ==
The old master shows a wry sense of humor at times. Master Tanaka flashes his katana with a practiced lightning speed to cleanly cut off the visor of Frank's baseball cap, with Frank becoming wide-eyed in frightened surprise. In Kickboxer, the lead character of Jean-Claude Van Damme is awakened flabbergasted at dawn by a splash of cold water from his master. In The Karate Kid, when an arrogant rival misbehaves, Miyagi tells Daniel a story about Okinawa: there was a bull that terrorized everyone, but one fine day there was a feast, when everyone was scared no more. The angry bull became tasty soup.

The Master also keeps an eye on his protégé's less martial and more "romantic" activities. He views them in an indulgent manner, as Mr. Miyagi does in the case of Daniel, as something that is but normal for the protégé's age. But he also takes care, directly or indirectly, to make the disciple remember that the "girl" should not be interfering with and hampering his martial arts training or lessening his commitment to training. Miyagi also displays humor when he explains to Daniel the importance of belts in martial arts: "In Okinawa, belt mean no need rope (to) hold up pants."

== See also ==
- Bak Mei
- Bruceploitation
- Cinema of China
- Cliché
- Jee Sin Sim See
- Ng Mui
- Sensei
- Sifu
- Stereotypes of East Asians in the United States
- Stock characters
- Wise old man
- Wuxia film
