= Ah Boys to Men 2 =

- Theatrical release poster
- Directed by: Jack Neo
- Written by: Jack Neo; Link Sng
- Produced by: Leonard Lai Yok Wai
- Starring: Joshua Tan; Maxi Lim; Noah Yap; Wang Weiliang; Ridhwan Azman; Aizuddiin Nasser; Charlie Goh; Tosh Zhang
- Cinematography: Amandi Wong; Ardy Lam; Chiu Wai Yin
- Edited by: Yim Mun Chong
- Music by: Zheng Kai Hua; Matthew Teng
- Production companies: J Team Productions mm2 Entertainment
- Distributed by: Golden Village Pictures; Clover Films
- Release date: 1 February 2013; (Singapore)
- Running time: 113 minutes
- Country: Singapore
- Languages: English; Mandarin; Hokkien; Malay; Tamil
- Budget: S$3 million (S$2.45 million; shared with Ah Boys to Men)
- Box office: S$7,900,000 (US$6,366,470)

Ah Boys to Men 2 (simplified Chinese: 新兵正传II; traditional Chinese: 新兵正傳II; pinyin: xīnbīng zhèngzhuàn II; lit. 'Recruits' True Biography') is a 2013 Singaporean military comedy film produced and directed by Jack Neo, written by Neo, Lim Teck and Leonard Lai. It stars Joshua Tan, Maxi Lim, Noah Yap, Wang Weiliang, Ridhwan Azman, Aizuddiin Nasser, Charlie Goh and Tosh Zhang in the second installment. It was released on February 1, 2013. It is the highest-grossing Singaporean film of all time, and has grossed over four times of its S$3 million budget. Maxi Lim, Noah Yap, Wang Weiliang, Tosh Zhang, Charlie Goh and Chen Tianwen would later collaborate again in Neo's next project movie based on lion dance known as The Lion Men and The Lion Men: Ultimate Showdown.

== Plot ==
Continuing from Ah Boys to Men, Ken's father (Richard Low) has become partially paralyzed because of his stroke but is determined to make a recovery. Regretting his selfish actions, Ken becomes a more responsible recruit, impressing the officers and sergeants, drawing bemusement from his mates and unwittingly causing “Wayang King” Aloysius to feel challenged by Ken. After a physical exercise one day, Aloysius butts in when Platoon Sergeant Ong asks Ken to explain his improvements and ends up costing his fellow recruits their smoking breaks, causing them to outcast and bully him. Ken's attempt to defend him sours the friendship between himself and Lobang, the latter leading the group's attacks on Aloysius. After booking out, Aloysius seeks advice from his parents; his father (Chen Tianwen) tells him the best solution is not to do anything.

Back at Tekong, Recruit IP Man learns about "Real Bullet" Zhen Zi Dan (Benjamin Mok), an "Ah Beng" who stole his girlfriend Mayoki (Sherraine Law). IP Man hits back by criticizing Mayoki for her inferior qualities. Lobang then helps Ip Man film and send a video of him with a buxom lady to Zhen Zi Dan and his traitorous ex. "Real Bullet" in turn uploads a video of him and Mayoki engaging in an intimate act. Seeing IP Man infuriated by this, Lobang and a few other recruits plot a scheme from what they learnt in their military training and ambush "Real Bullet" and Mayoki using human excretion mixed with chilli and wasabi in their car before escaping from Zhen Zi Dan's gang members. While the recruits celebrate at a restaurant in White Sands later that evening, they are ambushed by more gang members, who have managed to track them down. Ken runs back to save his mates, following the principle "Leave no man behind", unlike a fleeing Aloysius. Grateful for Ken’s heroism, Lobang vows to stop smoking and reconnects with him.

After an investigation by the sergeants, Ken and the perpetrators of the earlier scheme carried out that day are punished though no charges are pressed against them. Ken’s concerned parents speak to CPT S L Tham (Fish Chaar) after learning about what had happened. His recovering father thanks the Officer Commanding (OC) for training Ken to become a "real soldier", but is against him being punished for fighting when he was trying to do the right thing. The OC agrees to make an exception and exclude Ken from punishment, but Ken, after learning that the others would still be punished, is granted permission to continue his punishment. Aloysius, meanwhile, is mocked by his mates for his cowardice. He begs his superior to transfer him to another platoon due to this but is denied, being told he must learn to get along with his bunkmates in spite of their bad attitudes. Later, Lobang attempts to sabotage Aloysius for abandoning the team by throwing away his rifle magazine, only to lose his own. However, Aloysius quickly gives his magazine to Lobang during an equipment check and takes the blame. While searching for the missing magazine, the relationship between the two improves.

The eccentric LTA S T Choong (mrbrown) is chased by a large herd of wild boars halfway into an assessment for leadership potential; the soldiers are quick to come to his rescue. Following their passing out parade, the recruits reunite with their kins. Ken's father is present and comes to greet Ken; he is finally able to walk steadily without any aid. As the film ends, various recruits' postings are shown — with Lobang being posted to Officer Cadet School (OCS), and Aloysius being posted to Specialist Cadet School (SCS). Ken also goes to Specialist Cadet School, later being posted to Officer Cadet School.

== Cast ==
- Joshua Tan as REC Ken Chow
- Maxi Lim as REC Aloysius Jin a.k.a. "Wayang King"
- Wang Weiliang as REC Bang "Lobang" Lee Onn
- Noah Yap as REC Man In Ping a.k.a. IP Man (a parody of Ip Man, a popular chinese martial artist portrayed by Donnie Yen)
- Ridhwan Azman as REC Ismail Mohammed
- Aizuddiin Nasser as REC Muthu Shanmugaratnam
- Charlie Goh as REC Tan Wei Ming
- Tosh Zhang as 2SG Alex Ong, Platoon Sergeant of Ninja Company
- Luke Lee as 3SG Jed Heng, Section Commander of Ninja Company
- Fish Chaar as CPT S L Tham, Officer Commanding of Ninja Company
- Wilson Ng as 3WO K W Sng, Company Sergeant Major of Ninja Company
- Richard Low as Ken's father
- Irene Ang as Mary Chow, Ken's mother
- Yoo Ah Min as Ken's grandmother
- Chen Tianwen as Mr. Jin, Aloysius' father
- Ye Li Mei as Mrs. Jin, Aloysius' mother
- Sherraine Law as Mayoki, IP Man's former girlfriend
- Benjamin Mok as Gangster Zhen Zi Dan (literally "Real Bullet", loosely a parody of Donnie Yen), and Mayoki's new boyfriend.
- Biwa Mastura as Maria, Ken's maid and domestic helper working at Ken's semi-detached house for the Chow family
- Thien Jia Jia as Ken's Elder Twin Sister
- Thien Si Si as Ken's Younger Twin Sister
- Rovin Rajenthram as REC Kumar Krishnan
- Lee Kin Mun, better known as mrbrown, as LTA S T Choong:

An army officer. It is his first film role. For the role, he was made to go through "physical torture". At a press conference for part two, Lee said: "It was three days of physical torture. I ran about more during the filming than in my entire army life!" Neo has said that there may be more future collaborations between Lee and himself.

- Wang Lei as Ken's uncle (Cameo)

== Production ==
The film had a budget of S$3 million, which was also used for producing Ah Boys to Men. Filming for both movies took seventy days from July to September 2012. Principal photography took place for 35 days in Pulau Tekong, the site of the Basic Military Training Centre. The crew also filmed at Sembawang Air Base. One of the fight scenes, set in a restaurant, which involved ten actors, took one night to finish filming.

=== Music ===
==== Theme song ====
The official theme song of this film, titled "Brothers", was written, composed and performed by Tosh Zhang, a YouTube personality who is part of the cast in the film. An official music video was uploaded on YouTube on January 24, 2013.

== Release ==
The trailer for part two was showcased at the Asia TV Forum & Market and ScreenSingapore 2012 from December 4, 2012 to December 7, 2012. Within a week of its upload online, the trailer had already amassed approximately 20 million views.

Earlier reports gave the release date for the full film as January 31, 2013 and February 7, 2013. However, the official commercial release date for part two in Singaporean cinemas was later confirmed as February 1, 2013.

This film started premiering on January 30, 2013, two days before its commercial release, at the Festive Grand Theatre at Resorts World Sentosa – the first local film to do so. It was released in Malaysia on March 14, 2013, and also released in Taiwan in sometime in April 2013.

== Reception ==
=== Critical response ===
This film has garnered mixed reviews from critics, similar to its predecessor. In contrast to his review for part one, in which he called it a "misfire", Travis Wong of insing.com called part two a "perfect salute" and gave it 2 stars out of 5. Mervin Tay of The New Paper said that the second part "has the usual trappings of a Jack Neo movie, but with a context that will resonate with anyone who has been through national service, a rite of passage for all male Singaporeans and their families." TODAY's Christopher Toh wrote that it "isn't all bad but lacks a big payoff" and gave it 3 stars out of 5. Gabriel Chong of Movie Exclusive gave it 3.5 stars. She said that it was not "a perfect movie by any measure", but that it "still manages to tap onto the perfectly relatable and uniquely Singaporean experience of BMT for a moving portrayal of the bond of brotherhood forged through that unforgettable rite of passage." Writing for F Movie Mag was Shawne Wang, who gave it a negative review of 1.5 stars out of a possible 5. She labelled it a "misfire in practically every way". Dylan Tan of The Business Times felt that there was no improvement in the plot and it was the "same old drill". A Time Out Singapore reviewer commented that the film was "wrapped up in a heart-warming message". Channel NewsAsia called it an "enjoyable film with problems", giving a score of 3 out of 5 stars and citing the heavy product placement and over-emphasis on details as some of the situations that needed improvement.

=== Box office ===
==== Domestic ====
Neo has anticipated that this film would "do much better than the first part" and has also announced his consideration to produce more army-themed films. At a press conference for this film, Neo said: "I anticipate that part two will do much better than the first one and I hope that we will hit S$7 million this time."

The film earned more than the first film in its opening weekend; it earned S$1.51 million in its opening weekend, thus breaking the record for the highest box office earnings for local productions, which was previously set by part one in 2012. It took in S$2.7 million over the Chinese New Year weekend period; on February 20, 2013, this film overtook part one in box office takings by grossing S$6.297 million and becoming the highest-grossing Singaporean film. As of February 26, 2013, this film has grossed S$7.08 million. The film's overwhelming success has been seen as a "gift from Heaven" by Neo.

== Themes ==
Just like the prequel film, the main theme of the film is National Service in Singapore, a popular topic amongst Singaporeans.

This film focuses more on the unity of the protagonists, as well as tapping more on hot social topics like foreign talent in Singapore. It gave "a stronger story than its predecessor", and had a "more meaty" drama aspect, according to Neo. Other themes for part two include "[...] sacrifice, love, family and patriotism".
