= The King of Musang King =

2023 Singaporean film

- Theatrical release poster
- Traditional Chinese: 貓山王中王
- Simplified Chinese: 猫山王中王
- Hanyu Pinyin: Māo shān wáng zhōng wáng
- Directed by: Jack Neo
- Screenplay by: Jack Neo; Ivan Ho
- Story by: Jack Neo; Ivan Ho
- Produced by: Jack Neo
- Starring: Jack Neo; Yeo Yann Yann; Mark Lee; Henry Thia; Gadrick Chin; Glenn Yong; Angeline Teoh; Jamie Chu
- Edited by: Yim Mun Chong
- Production companies: mm2 Entertainment; J Team Productions
- Distributed by: mm2 Entertainment
- Release date: 21 January 2023
- Running time: 149 minutes
- Countries: Malaysia; Singapore
- Languages: Mandarin; Hokkien; Cantonese

The King of Musang King (Chinese: 猫山王中王) is a 2023 Malaysian-Singaporean Chinese New Year comedy film directed by Jack Neo. The film stars Neo, Yeo Yann Yann, Mark Lee, Henry Thia, Gadrick Chin, Glenn Yong, Angeline Teoh and Jamie Chu. Set in Raub, Pahang, Malaysia, the film follows an ambitious durian farmer Wang Mao Shan (Neo) who aims to expand his business overseas. He develops feelings for his neighbour and business partner Liu Mei Lian (Yeo) along the way but faces complications when her estranged husband Wang Jin Shui (Lee) returns. It also marks the on-screen reunion of Jack Neo, Mark Lee and Henry Thia after their previous collaborations in Money No Enough, That One No Enough, Money No Enough 2, Where Got Ghost? and Money No Enough 3. Secondly, It also marks another on-screen reunion of Yeo Yann Yann and Mark Lee after their previous collaborations as couples being wife and husband respectively in movies known as Being Human, Petaling Street Warriors and Lee Chong Wei. Moreover, it also marks another on-screen reunion of Yeo Yann Yann and Henry Thia after their previous collaboration in Love Matters where they both portrayed couples being wife and husband respectively. Furthermore, it also marks another on-screen reunion of Henry Thia and Gadrick Chin after their previous collaboration in Take 2. At the same time, besides Thia and Chin collaborating again, they also reprised their roles as Ah Hui and Sha Bao from The Diam Diam Era, The Diam Diam Era Two, Ah Boys to Men 3: Frogmen and Take 2 respectively. Also, it marks another on-screen reunion of Mark Lee, Henry Thia and Gadrick Chin after their previous collaboration in Number 1, in which Lee also portrayed a very similar role just like this film where both roles featured his characters looking for many jobs and work on them but ultimately were all failed attempts, which led them working as a drag queen in that film and durian seller with his family in this film respectively.

The film was released on 21 January 2023 in Malaysia and Singapore. It is one of the four 2023 Malaysian and Singaporean Chinese New Year films, with the rest being Ma, I Love You, Little Sunshine (Malaysia), and What! The Heist (Malaysia-Singapore).

== Plot ==
Wang Mao Shan (Jack Neo) is an ambitious durian farmer who wishes to expand his sales overseas, against pressures from the “Three Heavenly Kings” of the durian business. He helps Liu Mei Lian (Yeo Yann Yann), his neighbour and sole supporter, to improve her durian farm harvests, and develops feelings for her in the process. However, Mei Lian’s long-separated husband, Wang Jin Shui (Mark Lee), returns, and complicate matters between Mei Lian, Mao Shan and himself. Jin Shui tries to influence his and Mei Lian’s children Ah Liang (Glenn Yong), Ah Mei (Angeline Toeh) and Elder Sister (Jamie Chu) to go against Mao Shan, as the latter fights to save both the durian business and win Mei Lian’s heart.

== Cast ==
- Jack Neo as Wang Mao Shan, a durian farmer and Liu Mei Lian's neighbour, business partner, love interest and later husband and also Wang Jin Shui and Ah Hui's Enemy but later reconciled, Sha Bao's Best Friend, assistant and business partner
- Yeo Yann Yann as Liu Mei Lian, Wang Jin Shui's Wife, Ah Liang, Ah Mei and Elder Sister's Mother and also Wang Mao Shan's neighbour, business partner, love interest and later wife
- Mark Lee as Wang Jin Shui, Liu Mei Lian's Husband, Ah Liang, Ah Mei and Elder Sister's Father and also Wang Mao Shan and Sha Bao's Enemy but later reconciled, Ah Hui's Best Friend, assistant and business partner
- Henry Thia as Ah Hui, Wang Jin Shui's Best Friend, assistant and business partner and Sha Bao's Enemy but later reconciled
- Gadrick Chin as Sha Bao, Wang Mao Shan's Best Friend, assistant and business partner and Ah Hui's Enemy but later reconciled
- Glenn Yong as Ah Liang, Ah Mei's Younger Brother, Liu Mei Lian and Wang Jin Shui's Younger Son
- Angeline Teoh as Ah Mei, Ah Liang's Second Sister, Liu Mei Lian and Wang Jin Shui's Second Daughter
- Jamie Chu as Ah Liang and Ah Mei's Elder Sister, Liu Mei Lian and Wang Jin Shui's Eldest Daughter

== Production ==
Filming took place in the town of Raub, Pahang in Malaysia.

== Reception ==
The film grossed more than S$74,000 on its first day of release and grossed S$257,000 the following day, also the first day of the Chinese New Year (CNY) holidays. It topped the local box office over the CNY weekend, and earned S$807,000 in four days.

As of May 2023, the film is the highest-grossing Asian film in Singapore in the first half of 2023, taking in more than S$1.85 million at the box office.
