= List of Singaporean films of the 1990s =

This is a list of films produced in Singapore ordered by release in 1990s. For an alphabetical listing of Singaporean films, see Category:Singaporean films.

| Date | Title | Director | Producer | Production Cost | Singapore Gross | Ref. |
|---|---|---|---|---|---|---|
1991
| December 1991 | The Medium (also known as Medium Rare) | Arthur Smith | Derrol Stepenny Productions | $2,000,000 | $130,000 | |
1993
| 9 March 1993 | Time Tomorrow | Uncredited | Singapore Broadcasting Corporation | | | |
1994
| 7 October 1994 | On The Fringe | David M. Evans | Gramercy Pictures Pte Ltd | $400,000 | $200,000 | |
1995
| April 1995 | Mee Pok Man | Eric Khoo | Zhao Wei Films | $100,000 | $450,000 | |
| 13 April 1995 | Bugis Street | Yon Fan | Jaytex Productions | $2,000,000 | $1,000,000 | |
| August 1995 | Cupid Love | Uncredited | Channel 8 | | | |
1996
| November 1996 | Army Daze | Ong Keng Sen | Cathay Asia Films | $700,000 | $1,600,000 | |
1997
| May 1997 | God or Dog | Hugo Ng | L S Entertainment | $1,100,000 | $497,000 | |
| June 1997 | 12 Storeys | Eric Khoo | Zhao Wei Films | $280,000 | $650,000 | |
| July 1997 | A Road Less Travelled | Lim Suat Yen | Oak 3 Films | $320,000 | $29,000 | |
1998
| April 1998 | Hitman in the City | Jack Neo | J Team Productions | | | |
| 7 May 1998 | Money No Enough | Tay Teck Lock | JSP Films | $800,000 | $6.02 million | |
| November 1998 | The Teenage Textbook Movie | Philip Lim | Monster Films | $500,000 | $680,000 | |
| November 1998 | Forever Fever | Glen Goei | Tiger Tiger Productions/ChinaRunn | $1,500,000 | $800,000 | |
| December 1998 | Tiger's Whip | Victor Khoo, Tony Yeow | River Films | $1,000,000 | $60,000 | |
1999
| January 1999 | Lucky Number | Lam Po Ko | DS Movie Production | $500,000 | $360,000 | |
| February 1999 | Liang Po Po: The Movie | Teng Bee Leng | Raintree Pictures | $800,000 | $3,032,000 | |
| May 1999 | Where Got Problem? | J. P. Tan | JSP Films/Sunnez Productions | $900,000 | $140,000 | |
| May 1999 | That One No Enough | Jack Neo | Cathay Asia Films | $850,000 | $1,020,000 | |
| July 1999 | The Truth About Jane and Sam | Derek Yee | Raintree Pictures/Films Unlimited | $1,200,000 | $1,058,452 | |
| September 1999 | The Mirror | Siu WIng | Golden Mandarin/Mandarin Films | $2,000,000 | $160,000 | |
| September 1999 | Street Angels | David Lam | Act Venture Films | $1,000,000 | $115,805 | |
| December 1999 | Eating Air | Kelvin Tong, Jasmine Ng | Multi-Story Complex | $800,000 | $352,586 | |
