= List of films set in Singapore =

The following lists local and international films which were either depicting or set in Singapore at least in a significant part.

== 1930s ==
- Rich and Strange (1931)
- Bring 'Em Back Alive (1932)
- Out of Singapore (1932)
- Samarang aka Shark Woman (USA, 1933)[the setting of the film is dubious and could be intended to portray Indonesia, although the film was shot in Singapore/Malaysia]
- Wild Cargo (1934)
- Fang and Claw (1935)
- Booloo (1938)
- Singapore: Cross-roads of the East (1938)

== 1940s ==
- The Adventures of Chinese Tarzan (1940)
- The Letter (1940)
- Road to Singapore (1940)
- Jungle Cavalcade (1941)
- Mare Senki: Shingeki no kiroku / Malayan War Record: A Record of the Offensive (マレー戦記: 進撃の記錄) (1942)
- Sensen Nimankiro / Twenty Thousand Kilometre Battle Front (戦線二万粁) (1942)
- Marai No Tora / The Tiger of Malaya (マライの虎) (1943)
- Chinta (1948)
- Nasib (1949)
- Nilam (1949)

== 1950s ==
- Aloha (1950)
- Dewi Murni (1950)
- Kembar (1950)
- Pembalasan (1950)
- Racun Dunia (1950)
- Juwita (1951)
- Pembalasan (1951)
- Rayuan Sukma (1951)
- Sejoli (1951)
- Aladdin (1952)
- Anjuran Nasib (1952)
- Antara Senyum Dan Tangis (1952)
- Jiwa Lara (1952)
- Patah Hati (1952)
- Sedarah (1952)
- Tas Tangan Wanita (1952)
- Ayer Mata (1953)
- Hujan Panas (1953)
- Ibu (1953)
- Istana Impian (1953)
- Putus Harapan (1953)
- Sangsara (1953)
- Siapa Salah? (1953)
- Arjuna (1954)
- Iman (1954)
- Malaya Love Affair (马来亚之恋) (1954)
- Merana (1954)
- Panggilan Pulau (1954)
- Pretty Girl from Kuala Lumpur (槟城艳) (1954)
- World for Ransom (1954)
- Menyerah (1955)
- Penarik Beca (1955)
- Ribut (1955)
- Adek Ku (1956)
- Anak-ku Sazali (1956)
- Hang Tuah (1956)
- Semerah Padi (1956)
- Blood Stains The Valley of Love (血染相思谷) (1957)
- Bujang Lapok (1957)
- China Wife (唐山阿嫂) (1957)
- Kaseh Sayang (1957)
- Kembali Seorang (1957)
- Mogok (1957)
- Moon Over Malaya (椰林月) (1957)
- Panca Delima (1957)
- Putera Bertopeng (1957)
- Singapore: The Lion City (1957)
- Taufan (1957)
- Anak Pontianak (1958)
- Azimat (1958)
- Doktor (1958)
- Gergasi (1958)
- Hantu Kubur (1958)
- Kaki Kuda (1958)
- Mahsuri (1958)
- Masharakat Pincang (1958)
- Matahari (1958)
- Sarjan Hassan (1958)
- Satay (1958)
- Serangan Orang Minyak (1958)
- Sumpah Orang Minyak (1958)
- Sumpah Pontianak (1958)
- Air Hostess (空中小姐) (1959)
- Bawang Puteh Bawang Merah (1959)
- Dandan Setia (1959)
- Jula Juli Bintang Tiga (1959)
- Korban Fitnah (1959)
- Musang Berjanggut (1959)
- Nujum Pak Belalang (1959)
- Pendekar Bujang Lapok (1959)
- Raden Mas (1959)
- Rasa Sayang Eh (1959)
- Saudagar Minyak Urat (1959)

== 1960s ==
- Singapore (1960)
- Ibu Mertuaku (1962)
- King Rat (1965)
- Gerak Kilat (1966)
- Pretty Polly (1967)
- Avanthan Manithan (1968) (அவன்தான் மனிதன்)
- The Virgin Soldiers (1969)
- Wit’s End (1969)

== 1970s ==
- The G.I. Executioner, Dragon Lady, Wild Dragon Lady or Wit's End (1975)
- Priya (1978) (பிரியா)
- Ninaithale inikkum (1979) (நினைத்தாலே இனிக்கும்)
- Saint Jack (1979)
- They Call Her Cleopatra Wong (1978)
- Singaporenalli Raja Kulla (1978) (Kannada: ಸಿಂಗಾಪೂರ್‌ನಲ್ಲಿ ರಾಜಾ ಕುಳ್ಳ)

== 1980s ==
- Ullasa Paravaigal (1980)
- The Highest Honor (1982)
- Privates on Parade (1982)
- Ricochet (1983) (documentary about David Bowie, including footage of concerts filmed in Singapore)
- Souten (1983)
- Tanah Merah (1983) (American TV film)
- Miss Singapore (1985)
- Passion Flower (1986)
- Seven Years Itch (1987) 七年之痒
- Casino Raiders (1989) 至尊无上
- Raffles Hotel (1989)

== 1990s ==
- Ooru Vittu Ooru Vanthu (1990) (ஊரு விட்டு ஊரு வந்து)
- The Last Blood (1991) 惊天十二小时
- Medium Rare (1991)
- Tears and Triumph (1994) 昨夜长风
- Bagong Bayani (1995)
- Bugis Street (1995) 妖街皇后
- Mee Pok Man (1995)
- Army Daze (1996)
- Fatal Reaction: Singapore (1996)
- 12 Storeys (1997) 12楼
- Aur Pyaar Ho Gaya (1997)
- God or Dog (1997) 大巴窑杀童案
- Paradise Road (1997)
- A Road Less Travelled (1997) 轨道
- Forever Fever (1998) 狂热迪斯科
- Money No Enough (1998) 钱不够用
- The Teenage Textbook Movie (1998)
- Tiger's Whip (1998) 虎鞭
- Bailiu libai, Lucky Number or Saturday, Sunday (1999) 拜六．礼拜
- Eating Air (1999) 吃风
- Gen-X Cops (1999) 特警新人类
- Liang Po Po: The Movie (1999) 梁婆婆重出江湖
- The Mirror (1999) 午夜凶镜
- Rogue Trader (1999)
- Sex: The Annabel Chong Story (1999)
- Street Angels (1999) 少女党
- That One No Enough (1999) 那个不够
- The Truth About Jane and Sam (1999) 真心话
- Where Got Problem? (1999) 问题不大

== 2000s ==
- 2000 AD (2000) 公元2000年
- Chicken Rice War (2000) 鸡缘巧合
- In the Mood for Love (2000) 花样年华
- Stories about Love (2000)
- When I Fall in Love...With Both (2000) 月亮的秘密
- Winner Takes All (2000)
- Ajnabee (2001) अजनबी
- Fulltime Killer (2001) 全职杀手
- One Leg Kicking (2001) 一脚踢
- Return to Pontianak (2001)
- The Tree (2001) 孩子．树
- 24 Hours (2002)
- I Not Stupid (2002) 小孩不笨
- Talking Cock the Movie (2002) 讲鸟话
- 15 (2003)
- After School 放学后 (2003)
- City Sharks (2003)
- Homerun (2003) 跑吧,孩子
- Twilight Kitchen (2003) 聚味楼
- 2046 (2004)
- Avatar (2004) 流放化身
- The Best Bet (2004) 突然发财
- Clouds in My Coffee (2004)
- The Eye 2 (2004) 见鬼 2
- I Do I Do (2004) 爱都爱都
- Perth (2004)
- Pudhukottaiyilirundhu Saravanan (2004) (புதுக்கோட்டையிலிருந்து சரவணன்)
- Rice Rhapsody or Hainan Chicken Rice (2004) 海南鸡饭
- A Sharp Pencil (2004)
- Vanda (2004)
- 4:30 (2005)
- Be with Me (2005) 伴我行
- The Maid (2005) 女佣
- One More Chance (2005) 3个好人
- Singapore GaGa (2005)
- Unarmed Combat (2005) 铁男
- Cages (2006)
- The High Cost of Living (2006) 生活的代价
- I Not Stupid Too (2006) 小孩不笨2
- Krrish (2006)
- Pyaar Impossible! (2006) प्यार इम्पॉसिबल!
- S11 (2006)
- Singapore Dreaming (2006) 美满人生
- Smell of Rain (2006) 雨之味
- One Last Dance (2007)
- Pirates of the Caribbean: At World's End (2007)
- Seven - The Spirit Return (2007) 七
- Dance of the Dragon (2008) 龙舞
- De Dana Dan (2009) दे दना दन

== 2010s ==
- Singayil Gurushetram (2010) (சிங்கையில் குருசேத்ரம்)
- Red Dragonflies (2010)
- Already Famous (2011)
- Ignore All Detour Signs (2011)
- It's a Great, Great World (2011)
- Ah Boys to Men Part 1 (2012) (新兵正传)
- Sex.Violence.FamilyValues (2012)
- We Not Naughty (2012) (孩子不坏)
- Ah Boys to Men 2 (2013) (新兵正传II)
- Ilo Ilo (2013)
- Innocents (2013)
- Kan Pesum Vaarthaigal (2013) (கண் பேசும் வார்த்தைகள்)
- Sayang Disayang aka My Beloved Dearest (2013)
- That Girl in Pinafore (2013) (我的朋友, 我的同学, 我爱过的一切)
- Afterimages (2014)
- Gone Case (2014) (TV film)
- Inga Enna Solluthu (2014) (இங்க என்ன சொல்லுது)
- The Lion Men (2014)
- Ah Boys To Men 3: Frogmen (2015)
- Equals (2015)
- Hitman: Agent 47 (2015)
- Long Long Time Ago (2016)
- The Faith of Anna Waters (2016)
- Chennai 2 Singapore (2016) (சென்னை 2 சிங்கப்பூர்)
- Badrinath Ki Dulhaniya (2017)
- Tourism (2017)
- Crazy Rich Asians (2018)
- Zombiepura (2018)
- Detective Conan: The Fist of Blue Sapphire (2019)
- Wet Season (2019)

== 2020s ==
- Ahlan Singapore (2026)
- Magical Secret Tour (2026) マジカル・シークレット・ツアー

== See also ==
- List of Singaporean films
- List of films based on location
