= Cinema of Singapore =

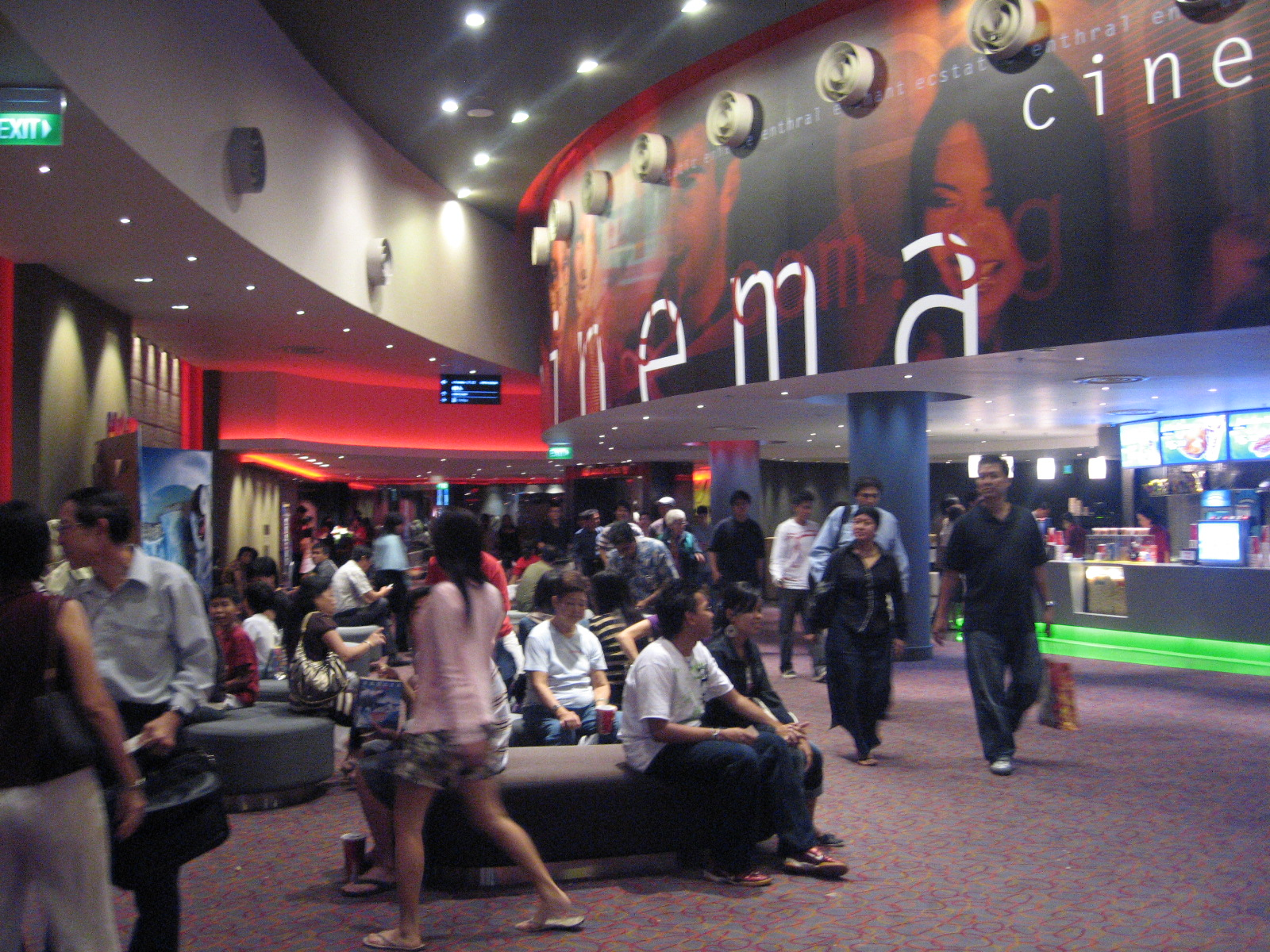
- Golden Village at VivoCity, Singapore
- No. of screens: 187 (2011)
  - Per capita: 3.9 per 100,000 (2011)

Produced feature films (2011)
- Fictional: 14
- Animated: 1
- Documentary: -

Number of admissions (2011)
- Total: 22,125,200
  - Per capita: 4.5 (2010)

Gross box office (2011)
- Total: SGD 189 million
- National films: SGD 9.24 million (4.9%)

Despite having a flourishing Chinese and Malay film industry in the 1950s and 1960s, Singapore's film industry declined after independence in 1965. Film production increased in the 1990s, which saw the first locally produced feature-length films.

Independently, a number of International films featured Singaporean actors and/or were set in Singapore, including Saint Jack, They Call Her Cleopatra Wong and Crazy Rich Asians.

== 1950s and statehood, separation periods ==
The role of Singapore as a film making hub for Malaya and Singapore (later merging into Malaysia) declined with the three-way standoffs between film unions, Shaw Brothers Studio and Lee Kuan Yew's government driving its superstar P. Ramlee northward to Kuala Lumpur to start his own production studio in 1964. This was further exacerbated with the Konfrontasi declared by Indonesia towards Malaysia causing a ban of Singaporean films from the Indonesian market. Even with the separation from the Federation, Lee's government throughout his tenure placed little priority on continuing its own homegrown film-making culture in preference to policies boosting its economy, which he later expressed deep regret after his retirement.

== After 1990 ==
=== Early 1990s pioneers ===
The first fully Singapore funded film came in 1991's Medium Rare, which was based on a real-life local cult killer, Adrian Lim, who was hanged in 1988 for murder. Although it cost over S$2 million in production, the film performed dismally at the box office. The film took in merely S$130,000 locally but broke the ice for the next coming Singapore movie, Bugis Street, which was released in 1995. Bugis Street was a gaudy film about the famous sleazy district where transvestites and transsexuals were found. Both Medium Rare and Bugis Street were directed by non Singaporeans. The same year saw the release of Mee Pok Man, the first full-length film made by an independent Singaporean filmmaker, Eric Khoo, on a tight budget of $70,000 to S$100,000. Concerning a lonely noodle seller who falls for a prostitute, Mee Pok Man earned much critical accolade worldwide and encouraged more experimental, independent filmmaking in the nation.

Army Daze, made in 1996, took a humorous look at Singapore's national service, and turned in high profits at the box office.

In 1997 came another Eric Khoo feature film, 12 Storeys, a highly acclaimed production which was the first Singaporean film to be shown at Cannes. Interweaving three stories about life in the HDB high-rise flats, 12 Storeys was seen as a breakthrough for Singaporean films, combining a coherent plot with Singaporean production crew and actors, such as Jack Neo and Koh Boon Pin. The rest of the decade was encouraging for the growing film industry. Glen Goei's Forever Fever (1998) was picked up by Miramax for S$4.5 million and re-released in the U.S. as That's the Way I Like It. These two years saw the releases of a number of other films, such as A Road Less Travelled (1997), God or Dog (1997), Tiger's Whip (1998) and The Teenage Textbook Movie (1998).

=== Late 1990s successes ===
However, it was the commercial success of Money No Enough (1998) which led to an in crease in local film production. Written by Jack Neo and starring actors from local television comedies, this 'heartland' comedy follows characters trying to make money quickly. Neo brought more realism by employing elements of dialogue in Singlish and Hokkien. Made for less than S$1 million, it earned more than S$5.8 million and became the most commercially profitable Singaporean film at the time.

Eight Singaporean films were made in 1999 alone. Among them were the notable Liang Po Po: The Movie (starring Jack Neo in a reprisal of his television cross-gender role); That One No Enough, Neo's first film as director; and Eating Air, made by film critic Kelvin Tong and film editor Jasmine Ng on a budget of S$800,000. While Eating Air and That One No Enough were not commercially successful, Liang Po Po: The Movie continued the success of Money No Enough, collecting S$3.03 million.

1999 also marked a watershed for Singapore films. Raintree Pictures, the filmmaking subsidiary of MediaCorp Productions, was started. Raintree Pictures invested in two regional co-productions, Liang Po Po and The Truth About Jane and Sam, which starred Singaporean television lead actress Fann Wong with Taiwanese singer Peter Ho and Hong Kong director Derek Yee. Raintree Pictures would finance a number of local and Hong Kong productions in years to come, and are the producer company of the films of Jack Neo. Subsequent productions, such as 2000 AD (2000) and The Tree (2001), also drew on Hong Kong star power; the company invested in critically acclaimed regional films such as The Eye (2002) and Infernal Affairs II (2003). Raintree Pictures also produced two English-language local productions, Chicken Rice War (2000) and One Leg Kicking (2001).

With the financing of a local production company and the setting up of organisations such as the Singapore Film Commission (SFC, set up in 1998), budding filmmakers, especially independent ones, found it easier to make movies on subsidies and loaned funding. The advent of digital video also meant that some novice filmmakers could experiment with cheaper alternatives. Features like Stories about Love (2000) and Return to Pontianak (2001) were both shot on digital videos, even though they were not commercial successes.

=== Early 2000s ===
The success story since the turn of the 21st century must be from local comedian-turned-director Jack Neo. Financed by Raintree Pictures, he made a number of hits dealing with Singapore's heartland problems in an engaging and deceptively light-hearted fashion. I Not Stupid (2002) was a peek into the ultra-competitive academic lifestyle as seen through three local students who performed poorly in grades; its acerbic social commentary marked another height for Singaporean films. Homerun (2003) was a remake of the Iranian Children of Heaven in a local, pre-independent era context; it won for its young lead Megan Zheng the first Golden Horse Award for Best Newcomer. The Best Bet (2004) took a humorous dig at heartlanders' obsessions with lotteries. Neo averages a film per year and his productions feature local Singaporean (usually television) artistes in filmic roles. They have been successes locally and abroad, especially in those places with a Chinese-language market, such as Hong Kong. He has started his own artiste management company, J-Team Productions.

Royston Tan, a Singapore TV commercial director who had been making award-winning shorts for years, released 15: The Movie, his first feature, in 2003. An expanded version of an earlier short film he made, this 90-min movie on the fringe and drug-abusing delinquents used bold subject-matter and featured some graphic scenes with non-professional actors. When the film censorship board passed it with cuts, it prompted a backlash from the director in the form of Cut, an all-singing musical satire à la Tsai Ming-liang lampooning the system. This short film was passed uncensored by the board and was seen during the Singapore International Film Festival, but there were open discussions about it during local parliamentary sessions, prompting remarks that the government was "not amused" by it. Royston Tan has since made three more features, 4:30 (2005), 881 (2007) and 12 Lotus (2008).

=== 2005 to 2009 ===
2005 could be seen as another mini-boom year for Singaporean cinema, with commercially successful fares like Kelvin Tong's horror flick The Maid, two Jack-Neo co-directed movies, I Do I Do and One More Chance, and less mainstream offerings like Eric Khoo's critically acclaimed Cannes opener Be with Me, and Perth, Djinn's dark take on Scorsese's Taxi Driver.

In 2006, the independent feature Becoming Royston paid homage to the above-mentioned filmmaker. It was made under new Originasian Pictures. The film went on its festival run in Europe and South Asia and was released in 2007. 2006 also saw the premiere of Singapore Dreaming by Woo Yen Yen and Colin Goh, who won the Montblanc New Screenwriters Award at the San Sebastian International Film Festival, the first Singaporean to do so. The film was also screened at numerous festivals worldwide and, in 2007, became the first Singaporean feature to win the Audience Award for Narrative Feature at the Asian American International Film Festival in New York.

In 2007, Jack Neo released another film known as Just Follow Law which took a dig at bureaucracy in the civil service, as well as the lengthy procedures one had to go through in Singapore to get a permit for various things. This film garnered generally positive reviews and was moderately successful at the box office. However, the success story of the year was Royston Tan's 881, which brought Singapore's seventh month getai culture to the big screens. While it was intended to be a niche film, it exceeded expectations and became one of the highest grossing local films of all time. Critics generally gave it positive reviews, and many believe that it was because of the film giving younger Singaporean Chinese more insight into their traditional culture that made it a success. In addition, the use of Hokkien songs, which had been suppressed by the government as part of the Speak Mandarin Campaign, may have contributed to its popularity.

In 2008, Eric Khoo's Tamil language social drama My Magic became Singapore's first film to compete for the Palme d'Or at the Cannes Film Festival.

=== 2010 and beyond ===
A wave of young filmmakers, considered the Singaporean new wave, who are educated in local and overseas film schools, begin to dominate the film scene. They include filmmakers like Anthony Chen, Boo Junfeng, Kirsten Tan, and Yeo Siew Hua.

Ilo Ilo, the debut feature of Chen, premiered at the 2013 Cannes Film Festival as part of the Directors' Fortnight on 19 May 2013 to very positive reviews. The film was awarded the Camera d'Or award, thus becoming the first Singaporean feature film to win an award at the Cannes Film Festival. In total Ilo Ilo has received 21 awards and 10 nominations around the world, making it the most critically acclaimed film in the history of Singaporean cinema. Boo Junfeng's films, Sandcastle (2010) and Apprentice (2016) have been screened at the Cannes Film Festival. While Kirsten Tan's debut feature Pop Aye (2017) was the first Singaporean film to win major awards at the Sundance Film Festival and Rotterdam Film Festival, receiving commendations from the Singapore Parliament. In 2019, Chen produced his second feature film, Wet Season. The film premiered at the Toronto International Film Festival and went on to be nominated for 6 Golden Horse Awards, with Yeo Yann Yann winning her second Golden Horse, for Best Actress.

Stranger Eyes (2024) by Yeo premiered in the main competition section of the 81st Venice International Film Festival, becoming the first Singaporean film to compete for the Golden Lion. In 2026, Chen released We Are All Strangers, the final film in his "Growing Up" trilogy. The film is the first Singaporean film to compete for Berlinale's Golden Bear.

== See also ==
Historic players

- Jalan Ampas
- Malay Film Productions

Related entries

- Cinema of the world
- Asian cinema
- Censorship in Singapore
- Southeast Asian cinema
- East Asian cinema
- Cinema of Malaysia
- World cinema
- List of Singaporean films
- List of films set in Singapore
- List of cinemas in Singapore
- List of highest-grossing films in Singapore
- The Substation
