= Money No Enough 3 =

2024 Singaporean film

- Theatrical release poster
- Traditional Chinese: 錢不夠用3：全部够用
- Simplified Chinese: 钱不够用3: 全部够用
- Hanyu Pinyin: Qián bù gòu yòng 3: Quán bù gòu yòng
- Directed by: Jack Neo
- Written by: Jack Neo; Ivan Ho
- Produced by: Jack Neo; Boi Kwong
- Starring: Mark Lee; Henry Thia; Jack Neo; Xiang Yun; Patricia Mok; Tang Miaoling; Regina Lim; Braven Yeo; Denise Fong; Kelly Wong; Ivan Lo Kai Jun
- Edited by: Yim Mun Chong
- Production companies: HiJack Pictures; J Team Productions; mm2 Entertainment
- Release date: 1 February 2024
- Country: Singapore
- Languages: Mandarin; Hokkien; English
- Budget: S$2.8 million
- Box office: S$4.9 million

Money No Enough 3 (Chinese: 钱不够用3: 全部够用) is a 2024 Singaporean Chinese New Year comedy film written and directed by Jack Neo. It is the standalone sequel to 1998's Money No Enough and 2008's Money No Enough 2, with Neo, Mark Lee and Henry Thia portraying as three young seniors who have been lifelong kampong friends and brothers as each of them faces their own family and financial problems. In their attempt to join forces and support each other, their grand plan falls apart when the younger generation challenges the beliefs and value systems of the trio. This resulted in their respective families facing multiple money problems and having impacts on each other and their families. It marks the third on-screen reunion of Jack Neo, Mark Lee and Henry Thia after their previous collaborations in Money No Enough, That One No Enough, Money No Enough 2, Where Got Ghost? and The King of Musang King.

== Plot ==
The film features three young seniors who have been lifelong kampong friends and brothers who grew up and became very close together: Li Qing Huang, a delivery man doing delivery services, Zhang Ming Hui, a teochew porridge restaurant owner and Liang Da Qiang, a grab driver. In their attempt to join forces and support each other, their grand plan falls apart when the younger generation challenges the beliefs and value systems of the trio. Qing Huang’s mounting debts drive him to desperate measures.

He borrows money from Ming Hui and Da Qiang and builds illegal businesses that eventually prosper. However, his greed gets the better of him and he refuses to return any borrowed money from Ming Hui and Da Qiang. Amidst his financial success, one of his businesses collapses, impacting not only his own family but also families of Ming Hui and Da Qiang, the two of which had sold their cars and gave the money earned to Qing Huang for him to invest.

After Kim Li, Qing Huang's daughter, falls out with her father Qing Huang over his increasing greediness and quits working for him, she walks into the rain in a daze and is struck by lightning. In addition, Ming Hui's wife ends up getting liver failure as she was eating health supplements from Qing Huang's business.

After a series of tests are conducted on Ming Hui's family and relatives to find a liver donor, Qing Huang ends up being the only suitable one for Ming Hui's wife. Remorseful of his actions, he agrees to a liver transplant. After the successful operation, he is put under investigation by the police officers for his sale of illegal e-cigarettes in Singapore.

A few years later, Qing Huang is released from prison, and is warmly welcomed back home by Ming Hui and Da Qiang, joined by his daughter and Ming Hui's wife, both having made a full recovery and they celebrate Chinese New Year by taking a family photograph and having reunion dinner together.

== Cast ==
- Mark Lee as Li Qing Huang
- Henry Thia as Zhang Ming Hui
- Jack Neo as Liang Da Qiang
- Xiang Yun as Zhang Ming Hui's wife
- Patricia Mok as Zhang Ming Hui's younger sister
- Tang Miaoling as Liang Da Qiang's wife
- Regina Lim as Kim Li, Li Qing Huang's daughter
- Braven Yeo as Roy Zhang, Zhang Ming Hui's son, Grace Zhang's older brother
- Denise Fong as Grace Zhang, Zhang Ming Hui's daughter, Roy Zhang's younger sister, the only family member who is a Christian, unlike her family who are Buddhist
- Kelly Wong as Xiaomei, Roy Zhang's girlfriend turned wife
- Ivan Lo Kai Jun as Ian Liang, Liang Da Qiang's son
- Tommy Wong as Li Qing Huang’s business partner
- Simon Khung as Li Qing Huang’s business partner
- Mayiduo as Fatt Long, Li Qing Huang's business partner
- Germaine Chow as Germaine, Kim Li's long-lost old good and best friend
- Kanny Theng as Miss Lim, Li Qing Huang's secretary
- Angela Ang as Xiaomei's mother
- Terence Cao as Xiaomei's father
- Zheng Geping as Interviewer
- Maxi Lim as police officer at roadblock
- Ryan Lian as police officer at hospital
- Jason Oh as police officer at hospital

== Production ==
This film is the first film co-produced by Jack Neo under the HiJack Pictures banner − a joint venture outfit formed in 2022 between Neo's J Team productions and distributor-producer Clover Films.

Budgeted at S$2.8 million, the film was financed by HiJack Pictures and mm2 Entertainment. Production commenced in October 2023 and is scheduled to complete by end of November 2023, with a targeted release during 2024 Chinese New Year holiday season. It was filmed entirely in Singapore.

== Release ==
It was released during the Chinese New Year period on 1 February 2024.
