= The Ghosts Must Be Crazy =

The Ghosts Must Be Crazy (鬼也笑)
- Theatrical poster
- Directed by: Boris Boo (Part 1: Day Off); Mark Lee (Part 2: Ghost Bride)
- Written by: Jack Neo; Ho Hee Ann
- Produced by: Jack Neo
- Edited by: Yim Mun Chong
- Music by: Zheng Kai Hua
- Production company: J Team Productions
- Distributed by: Golden Village
- Release date: 6 January 2011
- Running time: 97 minutes
- Country: Singapore
- Languages: Mandarin; English; Hokkien; Malay; Tamil
- Box office: S$1,133,840

The Ghosts Must Be Crazy (Chinese: 鬼也笑; pinyin: Guǐ yě xiào) is a 2011 Singaporean comedy horror film directed by Mark Lee and Boris Boo. It was released on 6 January 2011 for a sneak preview and was officially released the next day. The film marks Lee's directorial debut.

The movie content was split into 2 stories, one about taking a day off in the army, and one about a ghost bride's marriage, which is also pretty similar to the previous ghost movie known as Where Got Ghost?, where it was split into 3 different stories and also featured the story known as Forest Got Ghost which is a standalone prequel to Day Off in this film and another continuation to Money No Enough 2 known as House Got Ghost. This film also featured the return of John Cheng, Wang Lei and David Bala reprising their roles as Reservist PTE Nan, Reservist PTE Lei and 1WO Muthu, Regimental Sergeant Major from Forest Got Ghost respectively, despite the fact that their ranks are different in this film as compared to the standalone prequel, as they were Reservist SGTs and MWO respectively. This film also features the return of the film director Boris Boo from the standalone prequel.

== Plot ==
=== Part 1: Only ghost will give you off - 鬼才給你OFF (Day-Off) ===
Sometime in the 1990s, late at night, 2 Malay NS army reservist soldiers dig a shell scrape during a military exercise, encountering human hair buried in the ground. Attempting to pull it out of the dirt, the duo encounters a female ghost standing behind, which later apparently frightened them to death. The scene then changed to 2 Chinese NS army reservist soldiers, Ah Nan and Ah Lei trying to get their officer commanding, LTA Chua to grant them a day-off during their last unit exercise by telling him stories about the female ghost and the deity's revelation by Ah Nan and that Ah Lei's grandmother had passed away. They fail comically after Chua taunts the duo by telling Ah Nan to inform the deity to call Chua via a pager and challenging the duo to a duel. Another soldier, Ah Tan, comes to see Lieutenant Chua to get a day-off or light duty too, citing ill health (he suffered for internal injuries), but gets rejected as well. Since the beginning, Ah Nan and Ah Lei didn't believe that Ah Tan felt ill, instead thinking that Ah Tan acted to get a day-off, including Ah Nan betting that Ah Tan will get rejected by Lieutenant Chua for a day-off or chop off his head. Ah Nan and Ah Lei encounters their Indian Regimental Sergeant Major, 1WO Muthu, after leaving the commander's office while chasing Ah Tan, who demands that Ah Lei (who dyed his hair yellow) either shave his head or get his hair dyed back to black. Later, during a chat with other reservist mates, it is revealed that Muthu had apparently died in a terrible car accident sometime back with his head knocked off, unsettling both Ah Nan and Ah Lei (it is later revealed that it was nothing more than a prank on the two by their fellow soldiers at a briefing before the exercise).

During the exercise, Ah Tan, Ah Nan and Ah Lei are digging a fire-trench. Ah Tan, who is still sick, prepares his traditional Chinese medicine while the other two cooks their meals. When Muthu comes to inspect their progress, he notices Ah Tan's medicine cooking and, citing a real wartime scenario, naggingly scolds the three soldiers for inadvertently exposing themselves to enemy fire by cooking in the field and later confiscated their cooking equipment. Knowing that their training area is reputedly haunted, Ah Tan and Ah Lei attempt to spook their sergeant-major in the night as they encountered the same incident where two soldiers saw a buried human hair, leaving Ah Tan alone digging while still badly ill. Later that night, when Muthu returns to his field-post, he encounters the same ghost as at the start of the film, and while running away encounters disguised Ah Nan and Ah Lei (dressed up as long-haired ghosts), frightening him even more and leading him to inform Lieutenant Chua of his encounter with the spirit. Chua dismisses his claims and later meets with the trio (Ah Tan, Ah Nan and Ah Lei), where it is revealed that Ah Tan's illness gets worse and Muthu takes charge of sending Ah Tan back to the camp's medical centre (the medic attached for the exercise had reported sick previously). While driving out of the jungle, Muthu sees the same female ghost and in shock crashes the jeep.

Shortly after, Muthu gets out of the wrecked vehicle and runs back to Lieutenant Chua to inform him of the accident and that Ah Tan was killed. Meanwhile, Ah Nan and Ah Lei encounter Ah Tan standing alone in the jungle and are unconvinced he is a ghost (his pale face was pierced with glass shards and bleeding), mocking him for his acting and demanding him to frighten Chua to terminate the exercise. Ah Tan, however, is standing behind Muthu and is visible to both officers, spooking Muthu. Later, the duo (joined by Muthu shortly after) went to their commander's tent, where they saw Ah Tan standing in front of Chua as Chua berates Ah Tan for malingering and his acting attempts to gain an off-day or light duty request, despite Ah Tan exposing many unnerving traits and behaviour (such as teleporting and showing a bloody face) to the officer. Eventually, the female ghost reveals herself through Ah Tan's body, frightening Chua enough, who then runs off into the woods where his screams echo throughout. Ah Nan, Ah Lei and Muthu drive off in an army van out of the training area, all clearly spooked by what transpired. On their way out of the jungle, they pass by the accident site, encountering the police and the hearse handling Ah Tan's body beside the wrecked jeep. Suddenly, Ah Nan notices a second body-bag (aside from Ah Tan's) and alerts Ah Lei; it is soon revealed that it was Muthu's, shocking the duo. They then see Muthu's spirit looking down on his corpse and crying out that he was really dead (referring back to when the soldiers claimed he had died), smacking his forehead repeatedly until his head fly off, causing the two soldiers to scream and even louder after realising Muthu was still in their van, as is Ah Tan's ghost, who appears and tells Ah Lei that their commander has finally granted him a day-off. Suddenly, the female ghost appears behind and places her hands at the back of the van (with the duo still locked inside shouting fearfully, despite struggling to either get out or drive off) and pulls the vehicle back into the jungle as the men continue to scream.

=== Part 2: Only ghost will marry you - 鬼才嫁給你 (Ghost Bride) ===
Ong Kim Hui (or simply Ah Hui) is a middle-aged bachelor who has not been successful in his life, not being rich (and apparently having debts to loansharks) and having no luck with women (as he was dumped 20 times by his ex-girlfriends despite lowering his standards), despite his seniority in age. He encounters an apparent benefactor, Ah Hai, who promises to make him rich through striking the first-prize in lottery. Ah Hai takes Ah Hui to Mount Vernon Columbarium and makes him pray to the spirits of the deceased there to gain luck for his gambling exploit. While leaving, he picks up a wallet, opens it up and chooses to wear a jade bangle contained inside it, despite the protests by Ah Hai, telling him that it was fate that he picked up and now owned the bangle (which was revealed later to be a pair bangle worn by Xiao Juan too). He also notices two sets of numbers for 4D lottery inside and bets on them, and it is later revealed he won on both bets. After he rejoices with Ah Hai, he quits his job as a dishwasher and pays off his debt in full, surprising the loansharks (noting that Ah Hui had been near broke a couple of days before) and also splurging his new-found wealth on massages and women. He also gets revenge on his ex-girlfriend (Tay Yin Yin) and her new boyfriend by shoving her into a cage and dumping a starving cobra inside while he counts (stretching out the time as he counted from 1 to 3, as he was said to be “long in everything”, presumably slurred speech), leaving her to an uncertain fate.

Later, he visits a gambling parlour and after winning $35,000 as Ah Hai expresses congratulations, chooses to continue his betting, which ultimately turns sour and causing him to lose a large portion of his money. After realising Ah Hai has left, he despondently walks to the carpark to his car, where an urn lands on his vehicle, soon followed by many hundreds sliding on the floor towards him. Spooked, he runs to the carpark exit ramp and believes himself safe, only to watch thousands more come from all directions on the ground and surrounding him, all rising into the air as three float near his face and explode. The next day, at a hawker centre, Ah Hui confides in Ah Hai of his encounter with the urns and Ah Hai questions Ah Hui on whether he had returned the favour to the spirits at the columbarium for their blessings to him, to which Ah Hui said he had not, revealing to Ah Hai that he had just $30 left after spending his money around wildly. Ah Hai seems concerned but tells Ah Hui he has a plan to save him, eventually stating to Ah Hui that a female spirit by the name of Chen Xiao Juan (or Xiao Juan), who died in her late teens (22 years old) and single, has now expressed her love for him, shocking Ah Hui.

Ah Hai brings Ah Hui to Xiao Juan's home, where he introduces her parents, her sisters and their husbands to him. When Ah Hui asks to see Xiao Juan's photo, her father expresses his surprise to Ah Hai that Ah Hui claimed to have never met him (Ah Hai) before, sparking confusion between Ah Hui and Xiao Juan's family, and once the big picture begins to set in for Ah Hui, he is stunned to realise that Ah Hai and Xiao Juan are the one and same person. Xiao Juan soon enters the living hall and the writing on the wall became clear: that Xiao Juan's human persona is none other than Ah Hai, and she was actually drawn and attracted to Ah Hui while she acted as a normal human being and was helping him to get rich. Ah Hui's initial shock from being told by her family for them to get married becomes disgust as he felt Xiao Juan was ugly and more man than woman (due to her coarse voice). Despite showing him her genitals (shocking her family), Ah Hui still refuses to accept her hand in marriage and in his insults to her enrages her parents, who attempted to kill him before Xiao Juan steps in and scares Ah Hui badly enough for him to marry her. Ah Hui returns home and tells his mother about his marriage to a ghost, which initially concerns her but she lets it go after hearing Xiao Juan's mother (Lin Ruping) promising to grant her riches through buying lottery and winning every time along with allowing Ah Hui to marry again if given the chance but with the condition that Xiao Juan must be the main wife.

Later, Ah Hui goes to a Chinese prayer-supplies store and at the insistence of Xiao Juan purchases a large quantity of luxury goods and items for the afterlife (including a large 3-storey mansion, 3 iOne tablets (mock-up of iPad) which comes with a free jet plane and ten cars (all of the cars were mock-up of Mercedes-Benz E500), among others) and is later married at a temple ceremony to Xiao Juan before spending the first night together consummating their relationship. The next day, Ah Hui walks around in a daze and gets knocked down by a hearse while crossing the road but is unaware he had been killed until he saw his bloodied corpse lying on the ground, surrounded by a large group of concerned passers-by. He turns around and to his horror realises that Xiao Juan, driving a hearse with his funeral portrait hung on the bonnet, had run him over and killed him. Smiling, Xiao Juan comes to greet her husband, who is angry that she had ended his life prematurely as she had promised never to harm or kill him. Xiao Juan, however, dismisses it as mere deception and that Ah Hui had unwittingly fell for her lies. Unwilling to leave his corpse behind, he is eventually persuaded to leave with her for a “Great Singapore Sale for Ghosts”, and gets into the hearse and the couple drive away, leaving Ah Hui's body laying there while the witnesses look on.

This second part then ends with a phrase (in Mandarin) which states, “If you choose to make a deal with the devil, you must be prepared to pay the ultimate price”, before the credits roll.

== Cast ==
Day-Off

- John Cheng as Reservist PTE Nan
- Wang Lei as Reservist PTE Lei
- Dennis Chew as Reservist PTE Tan
- Chua Enlai as LTA Chua, Officer Commanding
- David Bala as 1WO Muthu, Regimental Sergeant Major
- Suhaimi Yusof as 1 of the 2 Reservist PTE soldiers scared to death
- Khairudin Samsudin as 1 of the 2 Reservist PTE soldiers scared to death

Ghost-Bride

- Henry Thia as Ong Kim Hui
- Mark Lee as Ah Hai/Chen Xiaojuan
- Tay Yin Yin as Ong Kim Hui's ex-girlfriend
- Henry Heng as Xiao Juan's father
- Anna Lin Ruping as Xiao Juan's mother

== See also ==
- Where Got Ghost?
- Greedy Ghost
- Money No Enough 2
