= John Cheng =

Singaporean actor

John Cheng Yeow Nam 钟耀南
- Born: John Cheng Yeow Nam/Ang Tai Mong; 26 December 1961; State of Singapore
- Died: 22 January 2013 (aged 51); Singapore
- Burial place: Mandai Crematorium
- Occupations: Actor, getai singer and compére
- Years active: 1998 – 2013
- Spouse: Lung Yoke Ching

Chinese name
- Traditional Chinese: 鍾耀南
- Simplified Chinese: 钟耀南
Transcriptions
Standard Mandarin
- Hanyu Pinyin: zhōng yào nán
Yue: Cantonese
- Jyutping: chung1 yiu4 nam2
Southern Min
- Hokkien POJ: Cheng Iāu-lâm / Chiong Iāu-lâm
- Musical career
- Also known as: 阿南, Ah Nan, Ah Nam, Zhong Yao Nan
- Origin: Singapore
- Genres: Getai
- Instrument: Singing

John Cheng Yeow Nam (also credited as Zhong Yao Nan; known in entertainment circle as Ah Mong, Ah Nan, or Ah Nam; 26 December 1961 – 22 January 2013), also known as Ang Tai Mong, was a Singaporean actor and Getai compere who made his screen debut in Money No Enough and was most notable for his criminal figure roles in various media. Liang Po Po: The Movie was one of his most notable performances of a gangster figure.

== Career ==
Cheng's first screen appearance was in the 1998 film Money No Enough, and the following year he was cast in Liang Po Po: The Movie. Cheng was best known for portraying thuggish, brutal types prone to violence, as a homage to his alleged past career as a loan shark. I Not Stupid was a noticeable first reversal of this stereotypical role – he was cast in a minor role as a police officer tasked with rescuing hostages. Other stereotype role reversals included a minor role as a friend of the three men in That One No Enough (also his first on-screen appearance without his beard), his portrayal of an effeminate hairdresser in 2005's I Do, I Do, and his last film role as a medium in the 2013 film Judgement Day.

Cheng was more active in the getai scene as a compere, along with other part-time actors like Lin Ruping, Liu Lingling and Wang Lei.

== Personal life ==
In a 1996 interview, Ah Nan opened up on his past as a hooligan. As one of five children with two parents working to support the family, Ah Nan was neglected and turned to smoking, violence and acts of gangsterism, under the influence of friends. He later joined a loan-shark syndicate and became a runner. Ah Nan worked several menial jobs before entering showbiz in 1987. He received his secondary education in Chai Chee Secondary School.

Ah Nan was arrested on suspicions of supplying ecstasy in 2006. He admitted consuming the drugs but not supplying them. He was jailed at the drug rehabilitation center for a year and on home probation for six months after his release.

Ah Nan courted controversy when he shouted at journalists during Jack Neo's 2010 press conference on the latter's extramarital affairs. Netizens were divided over his behaviour, with some rapping him for passing off Neo's affair as a norm.

Ah Nan married to Lung Yoke Ching twice and had three daughters.

== Death ==
In the early hours of 22 January 2013, Cheng collapsed backstage followed by a performance at defunct Club Cleopatra, in Parklane Shopping Mall. He died shortly thereafter aged 51, apparently from a heart attack on the next day.

Reports later emerged that Cheng had an unhealthy habit of guzzling 10 bottles of Coca-Cola daily, to sustain energy levels for his hectic working hours. He was also suffering from high blood pressure, liver failure and high cholesterol levels, and was taking medication for these conditions. Before his death, he last acted as a Taoist Medium in 2013 film Judgement Day.

== Filmography ==
- Money No Enough (1998)
- Hitman in the City (1998)
- Liang Po Po: The Movie (1999)
- The Mirror (1999)
- That One No Enough (1999)
- Return of the Condor Heroes (2001)
- I Not Stupid (2002)
- Homerun (2003)
- The Best Bet (2004)
- I Do, I Do (2005)
- Folks Jump Over The Wall (2008)
- Pulau Hantu (2008)
- Missing You (2008)
- Money No Enough 2 (2008)
- Where Got Ghost? (2009)
- The Ghosts Must Be Crazy (2011)
- Petaling Street Warriors (2011)
- It's a Great, Great World (2011)
- Dance Dance Dragon (2012)
- The Wedding Diary (2012)
- The Wedding Diary 2 (2013)
- Judgement Day (2013)
