= Greedy Ghost =

- Directed by: Boris Boo
- Written by: Boris Boo
- Produced by: Mark Lee
- Starring: Kang Kang; Henry Thia; Brendan Yuen; Jesseca Liu
- Edited by: Yim Mun Chong
- Production company: Galaxy Entertainment
- Distributed by: Cathay Karis Films
- Release date: August 16, 2012 (Singapore)
- Running time: 92 minutes
- Countries: Singapore; Malaysia
- Language: Mandarin
- Budget: S$1 million
- Box office: More than S$997, 400

Greedy Ghost (simplified Chinese: 贪心鬼见鬼; pinyin: Tān Xīn Guǐ Jiàn Guǐ) is a Singaporean comedy horror film and the third film in the Singapore Ghost franchise, the first was Where Got Ghost?, and the second being The Ghosts Must Be Crazy, the cast differs, though, with the exception of Mark Lee and Henry Thia, the film is written and directed by Boris Boo, who also directed the previous 2 standalone installments Where Got Ghost? and The Ghosts Must Be Crazy as well. The film is executive produced by Singaporean actor and comedian Mark Lee, stars Kang Kang, Henry Thia, Brendan Yuen and Jesseca Liu, and is about the greed of a worker at a funeral parlour causing him to see actual ghosts. The film is Lee's very first attempt as an executive producer and is also the inaugural time in which his talent company, Galaxy Entertainment, is funding a movie. Officially opened in cinemas on 16 August 2012 in Singapore, and on 26 July in Malaysia, filming commenced and took place in the latter.

== Plot ==
Whilst at his workplace (a funeral parlour), Lim (Kang Kang) discovers a mysterious book that is wordless, but, though, has a "Book Spirit" (Mark Lee) in it, who decides to gives him winning lottery numbers and financial advice. The winnings at first are meager, and are soon quickly depleted as Lim shares them with his two chums, Ah Nam (Brendan Yuan) and Lao Hui (Henry Thia), both of whom excavate bones from old graves for a living. Not wanting to turn from sudden riches to rags, Lim quickly approaches the Book Spirit once more. The spirit cautions Lim and warns him to think first, for there would be consequences, should he want to strike big. Overwhelmed by the thought of the vast fortune he would receive, Lim agrees to pay the price for his riches, although uncertain of what it would be. As Lim's life gets better and more lavish, he also becomes increasingly dependent on the Book Spirit, seeking its advice in everything. Soon, the Book Spirit reveals the price for which Lim has to pay for all his acquired riches... his life! It is only with Lim’s demise that he can be the next Book Spirit, thus liberating the current Book Spirit. Little does Lim expect, the richer he gets, the closer he is to his death...

At the same time, Nam steals some valuables he finds in a coffin so as to satisfy his cravings to gamble, albeit Hui trying to persuade him not to.

Strange incidents start to happen following that. A vengeful spirit begins to haunt Nam and Hui, causing them much distress…

== Cast ==
=== Lead ===
- Kang Kang (a.k.a. Kang Jing Rong) as Little Lim (a.k.a. Lin Dao Mei), a worker at a funeral parlour who discovers a "Wordless Script".
- Henry Thia as Lao Hui, a bald Buddhist monk who is also a part-time grave digger.
- Brendan Yuan as Ah Nam, buddy of Lim and part-time grave digger.
- Jesseca Liu as Xiaoqian, Ah Nam's girlfriend.
- Mark Lee (voice only) as Book Spirit, a ghost who grants Lim many wishes pertaining to wealth, but in turn comes to haunt him.
- Irene Ang as Nun
- Chua Enlai as Lama
- Chen Xuan Yu (a.k.a. NONO) as Pub Customer

== See also ==
- Where Got Ghost?
- The Ghosts Must Be Crazy
- Money No Enough 2
