= Red Storm =

Red Storm may refer to:

- Operation Red Storm, a name given to the Battle of Wadi al-Batin during the 1991 Gulf War
- Red Storm (film), a 2019 Malaysian action film
- Red Storm (computing), computing architecture
- Red Storm Rising, a 1986 novel by Tom Clancy and Larry Bond
- St. John's Red Storm, athletic teams of St. John's University
- Red Storm Entertainment, a video game company specializing in Tom Clancy licenses
- Red Storm (webtoon), an action and martial arts series, written by Kyungchan Noh
