= HerpMapper =

Citizen science project

- Website type: Citizen science
- Available in: English
- Website: www.herpmapper.org
- Commercial: No
- Registration: required
- Launched: 2013; 13 years ago
- Current status: Online

HerpMapper is a cooperative citizen science project designed to gather and share information about reptile and amphibian (herp) observations across the planet. Contributors create records of their herp observations online or via its mobile application. Data are available to HerpMapper Partners – groups who use your recorded observations for research, conservation, and preservation purposes. In addition, the HerpMapper mobile application is used by multiple other herpetological atlas projects, and the Minnesota Nongame Wildlife Program.

HerpMapper's primary goal is to share data with professional conservation and research organizations to better conserve herpetofauna around the world. Because of this, HerpMapper does not share point-location information publicly because of over-collection and poaching concerns. This sets HerpMapper apart from many other citizen-science projects.

== History ==
HerpMapper.org was officially launched in September 2013. It is currently a volunteer-run organization of professional herpetologists, IT specialists, and field herpers with decades of experience. HerpMapper is a registered 501(c)(3) nonprofit organization.

== Organizational structure ==
The HerpMapper Advisory Team includes nonprofit organization staff, state agency biologists, university faculty, IT professionals, and field herpers.

== Data Access ==
Data are made freely available to professional conservation and research organizations. Data are made available via real-time online access or via one-time data transfers.
