= Henry Thia =

Singaporean actor and comedian (born 1952)

- Born: 25 February 1952 (age 74); Colony of Singapore
- Occupations: Actor; comedian
- Years active: 1990s–present

Chinese name
- Traditional Chinese: 程旭輝
- Simplified Chinese: 程旭辉
- Hanyu Pinyin: Chéng Xùhuī
- Wade–Giles: Ch'eng2 Hsu4 Hui1
- Hokkien POJ: Thiâⁿ Hiok-hui

Henry Thia Hiok Hui (born 25 February 1952), also known as Alamak and Hui Ge (Chinese: 辉哥; Pe̍h-ōe-jī: Hui-ko), is a Singaporean actor and comedian.

== Career ==
Thia was a member of the main cast of Comedy Nite throughout its run, having the opportunity to work with both Jack Neo and Mark Lee. The trio also acted in movies together such as Money No Enough, That One No Enough, Money No Enough 2 and Where Got Ghost?, The King of Musang King and Money No Enough 3.

Thia is also known to the public for his strikingly similar looks to Singaporean politician Khaw Boon Wan, a fact he often acknowledges by jokingly referring to Khaw as his twin.

== Controversy ==
In March 2023, Thia appeared in an online video that allegedly promotes a Malaysian gambling website. He was subsequently asked to assist in police investigations. His agency, King Kong Media Production, claimed that the Malaysian advertising company had filmed the advertisement not related to gambling and added on the gambling content after they approved the video.

== Filmography ==
=== Film ===
Year	Title	Role	Notes	Ref
1998	Money No Enough	Liang Chao Hui		
1998	Hitman in the City	Chen Lai Shun	TV movie	
1999	Liang Po Po: The Movie	Ah Seng		
1999	That One No Enough	Liu Ah Kun		
2005	I Do, I Do	Prime Minister of Singapore, fortune teller, witch doctor, police officer, and stage director		
2005	One More Chance	Goh Chun Hwee		
2006	I Not Stupid Too	Bag Store Sales Owner		
2006	The Vietnamese Bride			
2008	Money No Enough 2	Yang Baohui		
2009	Where Got Ghost?	Yang Baohui		
2009	Love Matters	Tan Bo Seng		
2010	Old Cow vs Tender Grass	Moo		
2010	Phua Chu Kang The Movie	Lim Lau Pek/Lim Lau Hea		
2010	Lelio Popo			
2011	The Ghosts Must Be Crazy	Ong Kim Hui		
2011	It's a Great, Great World	Ah Boo		
2011	Fist of Dragon			
2012	Greedy Ghost	Lao Hui		
2013	Judgement Day	Liu Fu An		
2013	Firefly			
2013	Red Numbers			
2013	Everybody's Business	Ah Gu		
2014	A Fantastic Ghost Wedding			
2014	Kiasu			
2015	My Papa Rich			
2016	Young & Fabulous	Hao Lian		
2016	Let's Eat			
2017	Take 2	Hei Ge		
2018	Wonderful! Liang Xi Mei	Lion King/Ah Gong		
2019	Red Storm			
2020	Number 1	Fa Ge		
2020	The Diam Diam Era	Ah Hui		
2021	The Diam Diam Era Two	Ah Hui		
2021	Late Night Ride 开夜车			
2022	Reunion Dinner	Police officer		
2023	What! The Heist	Big Boss		
2023	The King of Musang King	Ah Hui		
2023	Seven Days	Chen Wei Kang		
2024	Money No Enough 3	Zhang Ming Hui		
2024	Fat Hope			

=== Television series ===
Year	Title	Role	Notes	Ref
2002	Beautiful Connection	Lin Ya Xi		
2005	Zero to Hero	Angmoh Zai		
2005	Folks Jump Over The Wall 飞越佛跳墙			
2005	World of Laughs 搞笑至尊			
2009	Sayang Sayang			
2010	Happy Family 过好年			
2012	Beyond X元素			
2012	Abang Ah Beng			
2016	Hero 大英雄			
2016	I Want to Be a Star 小咖大作战			
2017	Life Less Ordinary 小人物向前冲			
2017	Have A Little Faith 相信我			
2017	Happy Can Already! 2 欢喜就好2			
2017	Happy Can Already! 3 欢喜就好3			
2018	My Agent is a Hero 流氓经纪			
2018	Happy Can Already! 4 欢喜就好4			
2022	I Want to be a Tow Kay 亲家冤家做头家			

== Awards and nominations ==
Year	Award	Category	Nominated work	Result	Ref
1998	Star Awards	Top 10 Most Popular Male Artistes	—N/a	Won	
2000	Star Awards	Top 10 Most Popular Male Artistes	—N/a	Nominated	
2001	Star Awards	Top 10 Most Popular Male Artistes	—N/a	Nominated	
2005	Star Awards	Top 10 Most Popular Male Artistes	—N/a	Nominated	
2007	Star Awards	Top 10 Most Popular Male Artistes	—N/a	Nominated	
2009	Star Awards	Top 10 Most Popular Male Artistes	—N/a	Won	
2009	Asia Pacific Film Festival	Best Supporting Actor	Money No Enough 2	Won	
2021	Star Awards	Top 10 Most Popular Male Artistes	—N/a	Nominated	
