= Judgement Day (2013 film) =

- Film poster
- Directed by: Ong Kuo Sin
- Written by: Ong Kuo Sin
- Produced by: Mark Lee
- Production companies: Galaxy Entertainment; Mm2 Entertainment
- Distributed by: Golden Village Pictures
- Release date: April 18, 2013 (Singapore)
- Running time: 104 minutes
- Country: Singapore
- Languages: Chinese; English

Judgement Day (Chinese: 世界末日) is a 2013 Singaporean comedy-drama disaster film written and directed by Ong Kuo Sin and produced by Mark Lee. Starring an ensemble cast, the film follows various characters from different backgrounds confessing to their wrongdoings and revealing their biggest secrets just 72 hours from what is believed to be "Judgement Day". It was released on April 18, 2013. Judgement Day marks John Cheng's final feature film role before his death on January 21, 2013.

== Plot ==
With about 72 hours left to spend before "Judgement Day" supposedly arrives, various individuals start spilling out their greatest secrets.

The film opens with a news report broadcast to Singapore that scientists have discovered a meteorite heading straight for earth and that there was only 72 hours left to live. Upon hearing this, Henry Thia's character tells his family that his last death wish was to become a woman, so he goes for MTF surgery to do this. We then follow the story of how his children are ridiculed in school for having two "mothers". In the end of the 72 hours, we are shown a scene of people at their HDB corridors looking out at the sky, bracing for impact. The meteorite whirls down from space; however, the meteorite burns out into a small stone which hits a boy squarely in the forehead for comedic effect. The people rejoice; however, scientists break the mood and report that another meteorite, which was ten times larger and sure to destroy earth, was coming. The film ends.

== Cast ==
- Mark Lee as a police officer.
- Henry Thia as Liu Fu An, a man who decides to change his gender.
- Chua Enlai as Richard
- Rebecca Lim as Rebecca, Richard's girlfriend
- Guo Liang
- Edwin Goh
- Julie Tan as Xiao Lu, a prostitute with AIDS
- Lawrence Wong as Ah Song
- Sebestian Tan as a car salesman.
- Tender Huang as Taiwanese man
- Ko Chia-yen as Li Shuzhen
- John Cheng as medium Uncle Jiu.
- Adrian Pang as Prime Minister Dr Ang

== Release ==
The original release date in Singapore was put forth as "May 2013" in an earlier teaser poster; this has since been changed to April 18, 2013.
