= I Do, I Do (film) =

- Directed by: Jack Neo; Lim Boon Hwee
- Written by: Jack Neo; Boris Boo
- Produced by: Jack Neo; Titus Ho; Chan Pui Yin; Seah Saw Yam; Asun Mawardi
- Starring: Sharon Au; Adrian Pang; Allan Wu; Marcus Chin; Margaret Lee; John Cheng
- Cinematography: Andy Yuen
- Edited by: Martyn See
- Music by: Redwan Ali
- Production company: J Team Productions
- Distributed by: Mediacorp Raintree Pictures
- Release date: 8 February 2005
- Running time: 105 minutes
- Country: Singapore
- Languages: Mandarin; Hokkien; English
- Budget: S$800,000
- Box office: S$1,849,000

I Do, I Do (Chinese: 爱都爱都), is a 2005 Singaporean Chinese New Year romantic comedy film directed by Jack Neo and Lim Boon Hwee. It was the first time Neo had directed a romance film.

== Plot ==
A workaholic in an office building for fish ball production, Liu Wenhui, had been recently referred by several women as an "auntie" due to her appearance, age, and being single as she had recently rejected several dates with male partners, most recently with her colleague and truck driver Lee Ah Peng, who's also single. Her mother continued to advise on Liu on what to do to get a good relationship, while Lee, who sometimes went lazy, was also advised by his colleagues, notably Xu Wenbing and his friend and hairstylist Jojo Chin.

One day, Chen Jianfeng joined the company, attracting the attention of several women due to his build, leaving Lee jealous. while during a boardroom presentation, Chen volunteered to suggest his proposal; his attraction coupled by the praise of the company's proposal and his first impression, fueled Liu's interest to start a relationship; her colleague, Liang Yiling, later warned Liu about deception and told to stay vigilant.

Meanwhile, Lee and his friends went to a night class under Xu's suggestion to improve his skills after meeting with foreign tourists, one of which was coincidentally a lecturer named Rachel; they eventually began their relationship after going out for a supper after class ended, with Rachel building one with Lee; Xu however, also bond with Liang after coincidentally wear the same shirt of pattern and color and offered his shirt after her clothes was soiled by accident.

On that birthday of Liu's father, Chen visited her home as a surprise to give him a present, then kissed Liu on the scene. Lee and their friends begin to concern Liu seeing her elegant dress, prompting their next course of action including visits to a member-of-parliament and a witch doctor. One day, Lee rejected Rachel as he understands that relationship and friendship are separate, while Chen suddenly broke up with Liu and subsequently resigned the day after.

Xu quickly learned about Chen's sudden resignation when he was beaten up by loan sharks, allowing Lee to inform Liu on his whereabouts. Liu offered $10,000 of her savings to Chen; he initially refused, but the appearance of the debtors made her pay instead, along with another $10,000 from a cheque; he was released, then bond her for a night before he subsequently disappeared. On the following day, Lee's friends learn about Chen's true nature that he deceived several girlfriends of their money including a female customer; Liang later confirms it after she requested the customer some pictures with Chen, who then showed it to Liu.

Liu began to grieve after she went broke and Chen rejecting her calls, leading her driven to suicide through asphyxiation, but soon noticed the gas was empty. Liu called Liang for the number to order the gas tank, leading to her calling Lee's friends on visiting Liu's residence while at the same time, removing all hazardous objects except the gas tank, which Chin said it was too heavy. Realizing this mistake, they quickly went a few floors above to meet his relative, then Lee abseils a few floors down to save her, and subsequently sent her to hospital.

After Lee's unsuccessful part-time job stints while trying to earn her money back, Liu praised him for the determination and then fell in love, before kissing onstage during a getai performance; when Liu recalled about a divination lot that she would marry someone who was two years older, Lee's Chinese calendar year fulfilled it instead of Georgian calendar, allowing their marriage to happen. Elsewhere, Xu and Liang were revealed to have been married and Liang being pregnant.

Near the end of the film, Chen, Chin, their parents, and the debtors, while having dinner, revealed the secret about a setup was meant for Lee and Liu to form a relationship, praising them for a successful operation.

== Cast ==
- Sharon Au as Liu Wenhui
  - Liu was a hardworking workaholic who worked in an office building of a fishball production factory. She was revealed to be 35 years old and single at the start of the film.
- Adrian Pang as Lee Ah Peng
  - A truck driver and another worker of Liu's company, and a getai performer.
- Marcus Chin as Xu Wenbing
  - A fellow friend of Lee and Liang's love interest. He was usually smart and kind in terms on helping Lee.
- John Cheng as Jo Jo Chin
  - A hairstylist and a close friend of Lee and Xu, who presents a more humorous tone in terms on communicating people.
- Allan Wu as Chen Jianfeng
  - A charismatic worker who was employed in the company for a brief period. His stocky build and his charisma attracted several female colleagues.
- Margaret Lee as Liang Yiling
  - A fellow female colleague and Xu's love interest, namely due to a coincidental dress code with his, which became the film's running gag.
- Alexandra Dunn as Rachel
  - A foreigner and lecturer of an English night class; like Wu, her body appearance and her fluency of English attracted the likes of male learners.
- Anna Lin Ruping as Liu's mother
  - A mother who cared Liu and showed her that age is not a matter in terms on finding relationship.

Other appearances in the film include Mark Lee, portraying as a loan shark, Johnny Ng as Liu's father, Yoo Ah Min as the mother of Chen who resided in his home, Chuay Pui Chan as Lee's relative, as well as Patricia Mok, Lim Kian Hock, Jimmy Nah, Boris Boo, and Henry Thia, who portrayed the roles of the Prime Minister of Singapore, a fortune teller, a witch doctor, a police officer, and a stage director. Director Jack Neo portrays Member of Parliament Neo during the film.

== Release ==
The film released in theatres on 8 February 2005.

== Reception ==
Chen Yunhong of Shin Min Daily News rated the film three-and-a-half stars out of five. Wendy Teo gave the film two-and-a-half stars out of five, praising the performances of Pang and Chin, as well as the cameo of Lee, but criticising the film's editing, the "cliched" twist, and stated that "the thin material of I Do I Do doesn't provide a wide enough stage for their talents."

== Music ==
Song	Performed by	Lyrics	Music	Arrangement
"老天，不要在耍我！"	Luo Yang Bo 羅楊波	Boris Boo 巫培雙	Luo Yang Bo 羅楊波	Luo Yang Bo 羅楊波
"冲冲冲"	Joe Tay 鄭志福	Marcus Chin / Jack Neo	Luo Yang Bo 羅楊波	Zheng Kai Hua 鄭凱華
"就是你"	Joe Tay 鄭志福; Jessie Tan 陳美梅	Rebecca Leow 洪汐 / Jack Neo	Li Yi 李毅	Li Yi 李毅
"就是你"	Joe Tay 鄭志福 / Meeia Foo	Rebecca Leow 洪汐 / Jack Neo	Li Yi 李毅	Li Yi 李毅
"有了愛"	Jocie Guo / Jessie Tan 陳美梅 / Eileen Chong 章幸雯 / Jiang Shuai 姜帥	Jack Neo	Zheng Kai Hua 鄭凱華	Zheng Kai Hua 鄭凱華
"沒有了愛的人"	Jessie Tan 陳美梅	Jack Neo	Zheng Kai Hua 鄭凱華	Zheng Kai Hua 鄭凱華
