= Old Cow vs Tender Grass =

- Directed by: Chi Kai Fok
- Written by: Lim Teck; Kenneth Poh
- Produced by: Ng San San
- Starring: Henry Thia; Crystal Lin; Jack Lim
- Cinematography: Wai Yin Chiu
- Music by: Aniu
- Production companies: Clover Films; Apostorophefilms
- Distributed by: Golden Village Pictures
- Release date: July 22, 2010 (Singapore)
- Running time: 95 minutes
- Country: Singapore
- Language: Mandarin Chinese

Old Cow vs Tender Grass (simplified Chinese: 老牛与嫩草; pinyin: Lǎo Niú Chī Nèn Cǎo) is a 2010 Singaporean comedy film, directed by Chi Kai Fok and starring Henry Thia and Crystal Lin.

== Plot ==
At 49, Singaporean taxi driver Moo (Henry Thia) is still trying to find a lifelong companion. He encounters the young but eccentric Moon (Crystal Lin), who is always seen with her pet, Bubbles (the dog), and feeding stray animals, after taking her as a passenger, and takes a liking. Meanwhile his best friend and colleague, also a taxi driver (Jack Lim), is also trying to find love and finds success when he meets a dashing beer girl from China with the name of Xiao Hong (Siau Jia Hui).

== Cast ==
- Henry Thia as Moo
- Crystal Lin as Moon
- Jack Lim as Prince Gao
- Jia Hui Siau as Xiao Hong
- Nathaniel Ho as Nat Lee
- Luis Lim Yong Kun as Wu
- Tony Koh Beng Hoe as taxi driver
- Ix Shen as Traffic Policeman
- Dick Su as Unfilial Son
- Alaric Tay as Colleague
- Zhu Xiufeng as Prince Gao's mother
