= Hitman in the City =

Hitman in the City Replacement Killers 杀手一出手
- Directed by: Jack Neo
- Written by: Jack Neo
- Produced by: Irene Kng
- Starring: Mark Lee; Patricia Mok; Henry Thia; John Cheng; Felix Ong; Tony Kim Ju Gong; Luis Lim Yong Kun; Lin Xinghong; Lim Siew Keng; Michael; Craig Teo
- Production company: J Team Productions
- Distributed by: BMP Laser Enterprise
- Release dates: 1998 (VCD, VHS, DVD)
- Running time: 76 minutes
- Country: Singapore
- Languages: Mandarin; Hokkien; Cantonese; English

Hitman in the City (Chinese: 杀手一出手, literally When The Killer Strikes), also known as Replacement Killers, is a Singaporean telefilm directed by Jack Neo, released in 1998. The film is notable as one of two telefilms released by J Team Productions.

== Plot ==
Chen Lai Shun is a lowly clerk at a big company, whose head Lin Da Fa is Lai Shun's former neighbour. On the outside, the business seems legitimate, but it actually deals in drugs traded in from Thailand.

Da Fa receives a shipment of heroin brought in by two of his henchmen, Gregory and Michael, but discovers that two hundred grams are missing. He requests his middleman to track down the unknown thief, and initially suspects that his Thailand suppliers are responsible for the loss. Da Fa calls his superior Or Pang (Black Fatty), who brings along his small squad of hitmen. Michael however, catches Gregory in the act of hiding the heroin.

Lai Shun happens to be around when the injured Gregory passes him the package of drugs and requests him to pass it to an associate. Lai Shun throws the heroin down, unintentionally splattering the powder all over his associate. The hitmen then give chase to Lai Shun, but lose him.

Lai Shun then encounters his hitman nephew from Hong Kong, Liu Fei, and his fiancee, Linda, while on the run. Liu Fei takes him in, much to Linda's chagrin.

The Singapore hitmen then visits Liu Fei's home and requests him to assassinate Lai Shun, not knowing of their relationship. They then kidnap Lai Shun's family. Liu Fei leads the local hitmen on a wild goose chase, helping Lai Shun to escape from the sights of the hitmen, who spot him trying to hide at his sisters' homes. Linda attempts to rescue Lai Shun's family, but is strangled to death by Crow.

Despite Liu Fei's utmost efforts to protect Lai Shun, Crow and gang blow Liu Fei's plan, culminating in a battle of bullets that fells Lai Shun. Liu Fei finds Linda dead and engages in a gun battle with Dafa, Crow and gang. With all of Crow's henchmen dead, he challenges Liu Fei to a no-guns-brawl in the woods. The film ends as Liu Fei fatally bludgeons Crow with a stone and walks off.

=== Subplot ===
Jack Neo serves as the narrator of the film, touching on the complexities of filming a movie and the entertainment industry in general.

== Cast ==
- Mark Lee as Liu Fei
- Patricia Mok as Linda
- Henry Thia as Chen Lai Shun
- Felix Ong Kim Huat as Black Fatty (Or Pang)
- John Cheng as Crow (Wu-ya)
- Luis Lim Yong Kun as Henchman 1
- Lin Xinghong as Ah Hong (henchman 2)
- Tony Kim Ju Gong as Lin Dafa
- Michael as Dafa's henchman
- Craig Teo as Gregory, Dafa's henchman
- Lim Siew Keng as Lai Shun's wife
- Jack Neo as Thailand Drug Trafficker/Hong Kong assassin (Cameo) and Narrator

== Production ==
Originally, after the near failure of the production effort from the highly successful film Money No Enough, Jack Neo approached BMP Productions about a new movie prospect, which demanded Neo to direct a hitman action movie, threatening to end their partnership and distribute Hollywood action films that would cut into Neo's margins, if he did not comply.

Hitman in the City was planned by Neo to be an extension of his original eight-minute spoof movie, Replacement Killers, which won him the Best Director in the 1988 Singapore International Film Festival Silver Screen Awards.

Also while other filmmakers used Super 8 or Super 16 cameras and convert them into standard 35mm films during post production, Jack Neo wanted to post produce Hitman in the City on VCD, VHS and Singapore Chinese television channels instead of releasing it as a film to be released in cinemas. Neo then produced the telefilm using the Canon XL-2 DV camera. As Canon was a major sponsor for the telefilm, its products were advertised in the telefilm - specifically - the CanoScan FB 610 scanner, a BJC bubble inkjet printer and the CN600 laptop. Other sponsors included Acer, Institute Estetica De Beaute, Seksun Precision Engineering, Great World City, Fits Clothing, National Apparel and the now-defunct Singapore branch of Au Bon Pain. All sponsors were featured in the film as products used by the characters.

The office scenes were filmed at Seksun Corporation's headquarters in Yishun. The executive chairman of Seksun was Felix Ong, who played Black Fatty in the film and assisted with production. The mall scenes were filmed in Forum The Mall.

=== Re-release ===
After BMP Productions was restructured into MediaCorp Raintree Pictures between 2003 and 2005, MediaCorp remastered and re-released Hitman in the City in VCD, VHS and for the telefilm's first time, DVD. Though the remastered DVD edition's cover remains the same, the DVD edition also contains scenes that did not go into the final edit, a photo slideshow and the making of the film.

=== Title ===
The film goes by two titles - one being Replacement Killers and the other less-known Hitman in the City. The film went by the first name when it won an award at the Singapore International Film Festival, but appears to have been released on VCD under the second title. The Internet Movie Database lists the film's title as Sha shou yi chu shou (a Hanyu Pinyin rendering of the Chinese title), without mention of either English name.
