= Red Storm (film) =

2019 Malaysian action film

- Directed by: Michael Chuah; Abi Salimin
- Starring: Henry Thia; Zhang Bo Nan; Aijin Li; Michael Chuah; Henley Hii
- Distributed by: Mega Films Distribution Sdn Bhd
- Release dates: 5 February 2019 (Malaysia, Brunei)
- Running time: 90 minutes
- Country: Malaysia
- Language: Mandarin

Red Storm (Mandarin: 营救风暴) is a 2019 Malaysian Mandarin-language action film. The film follows a bodyguard, a police officer and their team who have to take down a large human trafficking group in Malaysia in order to rescue the kidnapped daughter of a rich tycoon and other hostages. It was released on 5 February 2019 in Malaysia and Brunei.

== Synopsis ==
Ru Nan (Aijin Li), daughter of a rich tycoon from China, is being targeted by one of the largest group of human traffickers in Asia. While she comes to Malaysia, her father assigns a Chinese ex-military, Hong Peng (Zhang Bo Nan) to be her bodyguard. The local police have also assigned a highly skilled police officer, Ah Bu (Henry Thia), to the case. Ah Bu is trying to solve the failed mission that happened recently which caused the death of his squad members. Unfortunately, the human traffickers still manages to kidnap Ru Nan. Now, the two, along with their team, will have to save the young woman and put an end to the group once and for all.

== Cast ==
- Henry Thia
- Zhang Bo Nan
- Aijin Li
- Michael Chuah
- Henley Hii
- Venice Min
- Tony Eusoff

== Production ==
The cost of the film is about RM3.5 million. The filming took place in Kuala Lumpur and Port Dickson, Negeri Sembilan.
