= Being Human (2010 film) =

- Directed by: Jack Neo
- Written by: Jack Neo
- Starring: Mark Lee; Yeo Yann Yann; Jeremy Chan; Tay Yin Yin; Wang Lei
- Edited by: Yim Mun Chong
- Production company: J Team Productions
- Release date: 4 March 2010
- Running time: 107 minutes
- Country: Singapore
- Languages: Mandarin; Hokkien
- Budget: $1.5 million

Being Human (Chinese: 做人), originally titled Being Human Being!, is a 2010 Singaporean comedy film directed by Jack Neo.

== Plot ==
Natural Beauty branch manager Mai Wei is fired from his job. He sets up a rival company, named the My Way Slimming Centre, with several former Natural Beauty employees, including his wife Zu Er's brother Jie. He soon licenses Dadavianxiaovoo, a herbal slimming drug which contains a banned substance.

== Cast ==
- Mark Lee as Mai Wei
- Yeo Yann Yann as Zu Er
- Jeremy Chan as Jie
- Tay Yin Yin as Wang Yaoyao
- Wang Lei as Wang Yaoyao's father
- NoNo as Chen Xuanyu
- Huang Hui as Natural Beauty boss
- Huang Tongyao as associate
- Zhong Jiayan as slim Wang Yaoyao
- Mei Xin as Mrs. Li
- Abigail Chay as Dadavianxiaovoo saleswoman
- Jack Neo as waiter
- Wendy Chong

== Release ==
The film released in theatres in Singapore on 4 March 2010.

== Reception ==
Derek Elley of Film Business Asia rated the film 7 out of 10. Kwok Kar Peng of The New Paper rated the film 3.5 stars out of 5, writing "Unlike his previous movies, Jack peppers morals sparingly here. The pacing and story are tight with an interesting ending, and the chemistry among the cast is sizzling." Katrina Brooke Lam of Today wrote the film a negative review.
