= Love Matters (film) =

- Film poster
- Directed by: Jack Neo; Gilbert Chan
- Written by: Jack Neo; Gilbert Chan; Boris Boo; Ho Hee Ann
- Produced by: Jack Neo; Mang; Philip Wu
- Starring: Henry Thia; Yeo Yann Yann; Jack Lim; Alex Leong; Cheryl Lee; Natalli Ong; Mark Lee; Lai Meng
- Edited by: Yim Mun Chong
- Production company: Neo Studios
- Distributed by: Golden Village
- Release date: 22 January 2009 (Singapore)
- Country: Singapore
- Language: Mandarin
- Box office: US$1,108,032

Love Matters (Chinese: 幸福万岁) is a Singaporean comedy film written and directed by Jack Neo and Gilbert Chan, and produced by Neo Studios, MM Studios & Grand Brilliance

== Plot ==
Love Matters revolves around three main protagonists – 52-year-old Tan Bo Seng, his 17-year-old son Benny and 36-year-old Jeremy Tan, Bo Seng's ‘adopted’ brother – and their accidental journey in seeking and keeping love and happiness.

Bo Seng leads a routine life. His attempts to revive the passion with his wife Jia Li do not improve their relationship. Jeremy has had many girlfriends, and "Never to commit" is his motto for love. Benny's life revolves around school and computers, and he has a crush on Jennifer, his classmate's girlfriend.

Bo Seng & Jia Li the old fashion couple has more misses than hits in the love department and a series of madness spin off one night.

Jeremy meets Benny's teacher, Ms Wong - a lady, unlike the wild things he has had. His charm wins him her heart, but his Casanova means refuse to take a back seat, a new lady friend threatens to change his life ...

Benny starts to see hope in relationships, when Jennifer notices him and invites him over to her place. Over the visit, Jennifer's friendly attention, takes a turn into something that Benny wish he has not been.

== Cast ==
- Henry Thia as Tan Bo Seng
- Yeo Yann Yann as Jia Li
- Jack Lim as Jeremy Tan
- Alex Leong as Benny Tan
- Cheryl Lee as Miss Wong
- Natalli Ong as Jennifer
- Mark Lee
- Lai Meng

== Production ==
The film is co-directed by Jack Neo and Gilbert Chan.

== Reception ==
May Seah of Today rated the film two out of five stars.
