= The Mirror (1999 film) =

1999 Hong Kong film by Siu Wing

- Promotional poster
- Traditional Chinese: 怪談之魔鏡
- Simplified Chinese: 怪谈之魔镜
- Hanyu Pinyin: Guài Tán Zhī Mó Jìng
- Jyutping: Gwaai3 Taam4 Zi1 Mo1 Geng3
- Directed by: Siu Wing
- Written by: Raymond Wong; Liu Xiaoguang
- Produced by: Raymond Wong; Ha Boon-kwang
- Starring: Nicholas Tse; Ruby Lin; Lillian Ho; Law Lan; Jack Neo; Xu Fan; Sherming Yiu
- Cinematography: Kwong Ting-wo
- Edited by: Marco Mak
- Music by: Marco Mak
- Production company: Mandarin Films
- Distributed by: Mandarin Films Distribution Co. Ltd.
- Release date: 16 September 1999
- Running time: 87 minutes
- Country: Hong Kong
- Languages: Cantonese; Mandarin; Hokkien

The Mirror is a 1999 Hong Kong horror anthology film directed by Siu Wing, produced and written by Raymond Wong, and starring Nicholas Tse, Ruby Lin, Lillian Ho, Law Lan, Jack Neo, Xu Fan and Sherming Yiu.

== Plot ==
The film is divided into five unrelated segments with the mirror on an antique dressing table serving as the plot device.

The first segment is set in a brothel in 16th-century China. A courtesan is murdered and her blood spills onto the mirror on her dressing table.

The second segment is set in Shanghai in 1922. Mary, the wheelchair-bound heiress to a large mansion, receives an antique dressing table as a birthday gift. She notices that there is something strange about the mirror and starts receiving eerie phone calls reminding her about her dark secrets in the past. She had an affair with a professor who already had a family. In order to silence him and take over his mansion, she poisoned him to death. One night, her two servants confront her, tell her that they are actually the professor's daughters, and avenge their father.

The third segment is set in Singapore in 1988 during the Ghost Festival. James, a lawyer, has a one-night stand with Lora and tries to get away in the morning but her burly, Teochew-speaking brother Roman stops him and forces him to marry Lora. Lora moves into James's house and brings along an antique dressing table that she inherited from her deceased parents. One day, a woman approaches James and offers him a million dollars to defend her son, who has been accused of raping a lady and murdering her boyfriend. Overcome by greed, James ignores his conscience, defends the accused in court, and wins the case. James gets into a car accident later and his face is injured so badly that he has to undergo reconstructive surgery. When the bandages are removed, James is horrified to see that he now looks exactly like the rape victim's deceased boyfriend.

The fourth segment is set in Hong Kong in 1999. An old woman and her granddaughter, Yu, are waiting for the latter's cousin Ming to come home from his overseas studies. When Ming returns, he brings along his girlfriend, Judy, and announces his decision to marry her. Yu becomes very jealous because she is in love with Ming. One day, Ming and Judy purchase an antique dressing table from a shop and bring it home. Yu finds the mirror very weird and starts feeling uneasy. Judy's pet puppy also keeps barking at her. One night, the puppy is brutally killed, and Ming's grandmother goes missing on the following night. Ming's grandmother is eventually found dead with her body dismembered. Yu is blamed for the murder and gets arrested by the police. Later, Ming brings Judy to the mirror and tells her that he knows she murdered his grandmother so that she could inherit his grandmother's fortune. Judy reveals her true colours and tries to kill Ming but misses her step and ends up impaling herself on a pair of scissors stuck to the dressing table. Ming and Yu, the latter cleared of her charges, are reunited.

The fifth segment is set in Taiwan in 2000. A woman approaches the antique dressing table and sees her eyeballs falling out from their sockets in her reflection in the mirror.

== Cast ==
In order of appearance:

- Sherming Yiu as courtesan
- Xu Fan as Mary
- Li Zhirui as dumb girl
- Chen Shasha as Mary's housekeeper
- Jack Neo as James
- Lynn Poh as Lora
- John Cheng as Roman
- Karen Tong as rape victim
- Lin Ruping as accused's mother
- Raymond Wong as rape victim's boyfriend
- Lillian Ho as Yu
- Law Lan as Ming's grandmother
- Nicholas Tse as Ming
- Ruby Lin as Judy
