= Money No Enough 2 =

2008 Singaporean comedy film

- Theatrical release poster
- Directed by: Jack Neo
- Written by: Jack Neo; Ho Hee Ann
- Produced by: Toong Soo Wei; Seah Saw Yam; Lim Teck
- Starring: Henry Thia; Mark Lee; Jack Neo; Lai Meng; Anna Lin Ruping; Vivian Lai; Choo Lingling; Natalli Ong Ai Wen; John Cheng
- Cinematography: Ardy Lam
- Edited by: Martyn See; Rayner Lim; Justina Ee
- Music by: Benny Wong
- Production companies: Neo Studios; Mediacorp Raintree Pictures; Scorpio East Pictures
- Distributed by: Golden Village
- Release date: 31 July 2008
- Running time: 126 minutes
- Country: Singapore
- Languages: Hokkien; Mandarin; English
- Box office: S$4.8 million

Money No Enough 2 (Chinese: 钱不够用2; pinyin: Qián Bù Gòu Yòng 2) is a 2008 Singaporean comedy film written and directed by Jack Neo and produced by Neo Studios, Mediacorp Raintree Pictures and Scorpio East Pictures. It is a standalone sequel to the 1998 film Money No Enough, with Neo, Mark Lee and Henry Thia playing as three brothers in this film having to take care of their elderly mother Yang (Lai Meng). It was released in cinemas on 31 July 2008.

A third standalone installment, titled Money No Enough 3, which was also directed by Neo and also stars Lee, Thia and Neo himself, was released on 1 February 2024.

== Plot ==
The film features three brothers: Yang Baohui, the eldest brother who is a delivery man, Yang Baohuang, the youngest brother who is the CEO, managing director and supervisor for a health supplement trading company known as Caring Pollen (爱馨花粉) and Yang Baoqiang, the second brother who is a real estate agent. Baohui, who has been working as a delivery for 30 years, quits his job as he feels underappreciated for his long service. At a business conference, Baohuang offers Baohui to take a share of his Caring Pollen (爱馨花粉) company and become a manager; and then Baohui borrows S$10,000 from Mother Yang to do so. Meanwhile, Baoqiang takes on a large investment upon his real estate agent's advice, despite his wife Lingling's qualms about the potential losses if unsuccessful.

Mother Yang is diagnosed with diabetes and lipoma. While Baohuang's wife Yanyan requests a medical scan, Baohuang opposes it due to the long waiting time. As a manager, Baohui manages to earn enough money in a few days to pay off Mother Yang and buy a panel van, pay television and tickets to the Singapore Grand Prix for his family. Baohuang is caught by police officers for speeding; Yanyan takes the blame. Their marriage is further strained when Baohuang visits a nightclub and gets drunk when returning home. Baohui, growing more arrogant in his new job, attempts to sue the parking attendant when issued a summon when he was parking at the white line parking lot on Sunday after 10p.m. which he thought it was season parking despite putting parking coupon; and ends up getting charged for contempt.

The news reports poisoning cases from Caring Pollen, which is declared unsafe for public consumption. Baohuang's business partner, Chen Guan Sai, reveals that he borrowed S$80,000 from loan sharks to initiate the business and demands S$100,000 from Baohuang. While unsure how to sell the remaining batch of health supplements, Baohui and Baohuang try to reassure their employees to wait for the laboratory results. Meanwhile, Baoqiang tries to recoup money from a lawyer who ran away with his money as his property investments fail. Unable to pay their mortgage loan for the bungalow, the family ends up moving into a HDB Flat, much to his daughter Stella Yang's chagrin.

Mother Yang is approached by each of the three brothers and she gives up her life savings for them. Upon her two good friend's advices, she attempts to act as a beggar but is caught and the brothers have to bail her out. Mother Yang suddenly collapses but recovers in a private hospital. Yanyan gives Baohuang a S$100,000 cheque which he uses to pay off his debts and return to Guan Sai. However, Yanyan is soon discovered to have embezzled her company's funds. Baohuang berates her for being foolish as she is taken away by police officers of the Corrupt Practices Investigation Bureau.

Baohui and Baohuang begin new jobs as a cleaner at a kopitiam and a taxi driver respectively. Baoqiang continues his job as real estate agent, while Lingling and Stella performs at getai concerts. Mother Yang is diagnosed with dementia and the brothers are overwhelmed taking care of her, so they decide to send her to a retirement home where she collapses in shock. Warded into the private hospital's intensive care unit. the brothers grow concerned about the daily medical bills, so they burn a talisman for their mother to pass on quickly. A frightened Baoqiang stops the burning as their mother's condition worsens. Meanwhile, Lingling, Stella and the singers are involved in a car accident; Stella is sent to the same hospital for her injuries. Stella needs blood but the only two O− blood bags available at the hospital are given to Mother Yang. Lingling races to Yang's ward for the blood bags and argues with Baoqiang about who to save. Mother Yang, who overhears the argument, pulls her life support.

After Yanyan is released from jail, the family gathers to pray to Mother Yang to repent for their misdeeds while thanking her for winning the first prize in a 4D lottery. At dinner, Baohuang introduces a new safely-tested supplement to Baohui and Baoqiang, and they become directors of this new business venture.

== Cast ==
- Henry Thia as Yang Baohui
  The eldest brother of the Yang family who was a dedicated delivery man for 30 years before working as a manager for his youngest brother Baohuang's Caring Pollen (爱馨花粉) company. He is sometimes smart but also quirky solving issues.
- Mark Lee as Yang Baohuang
  The youngest brother of the Yang family who is a CEO, managing director and supervisor for a health supplement trading company known as Caring Pollen (爱馨花粉). He was arrogant and sleazy but care among the brothers the most. and owns a Mazda RX-8. He was arrogant and sleazy but care among the brothers the most, and an experienced sports car driver which he used to drive the Mazda RX-8 sports car before selling it away due to not having enough money paying his loan and then eventually become a taxi driver driving a Blue Comfort Hyundai Sonata Taxi.
- Jack Neo as Yang Baoqiang
  The second brother of the Yang family who owns a BMW X3 and a bungalow due to the large profits that he got from the resulting sales as a real estate agent. He was quick and decisive on solving questions especially handling money problems, notably after the time when he lives in a HDB Flat.
- Lai Meng as Mother Yang
  The mother of Baohui, Baohuang and Baoqiang. She has a record of diabetes and began displaying signs and symptoms throughout the course of the film. Yang was also much kindred to the three brothers on the actions and remain loyal.
- Anna Lin Ruping as Lin Xiuyun
  The wife of eldest brother Baohui, who usually care the most for Baohui and her 3 daughters.
- Vivian Lai as Zhou Yanyan
  The wife of youngest brother Baohuang and the caregiver of the Yang family. Yanyan was also sometimes protective and truthful to Baohuang but their relationship find it hard to get a firm ground.
- Choo Lingling as Zhang Lingling
  The wife of second brother Baoqiang, who she was also a spendthrift but conservative, providing keen advices to Baoqiang whenever he need.
- Natalli Ong Ai Wen as Stella Yang
  The only daughter of Baoqiang who is a passionate singer. She likes to live in a lap of luxury by living in a bungalow and dislikes adapting in a normal life once they settled in a HDB Flat.
- John Cheng as Chen Guan Sai
  An employee and business partner who worked under Baohuang and a former loan shark.
- Wang Lei as Yang Baohuang's good friend whom is a taxi driver.
- Tony Koh Beng Hoe as Yang Baohuang's good friend whom is a taxi driver.
- Michelle Choo as a getai singer
- Huang Bihua as a getai singer
- Michael Palmer as himself, one of the Member Of Parliament attending to Yang Baoqiang.

== Sequels ==
In 2009, a short sequel was included in the film Where Got Ghost?, a 2009 Singaporean anthology comedy horror film directed by Neo and Boris Boo.

In April 2020, an online live session between Neo and Lee hinted at a possible sequel for this film and are currently writing the script for the upcoming sequel titled Money No Enough 3. Filming was initially planned to begin in September 2020, but was delayed due to the COVID-19 pandemic in Singapore. Neo stated that the film concept in the third film series would be a departure from the prequel and this film as he implied that people’s perception and concept of money has been changed. Money No Enough 3 is the first film co-produced by Neo under the HiJack Pictures banner − a joint venture outfit formed in 2022 between Neo's J Team productions and distributor-producer Clover Films.

Budgeted at S$2.8 million, Money No Enough 3 was financed by HiJack Pictures and mm2 Entertainment. Production commenced in October 2023 and is scheduled to complete by end of November 2023, with a targeted release during 2024 Chinese New Year holiday season. It was filmed entirely in Singapore. Therefore, eventually, Money No Enough 3 was released during the Chinese New Year period on 1 February 2024.
