= Where Got Ghost? =

- Directed by: Jack Neo; Boris Boo
- Written by: Jack Neo; Ho Hee Ann; Boris Boo; Bon Siek Yeung
- Produced by: Toong Soo Wei; Lim Teck; Patrick Tong
- Starring: Henry Thia; Mark Lee; Jack Neo; Anna Lin Ruping; Vivian Lai; Choo Lingling; Natalli Ong Ai Wen; Lai Meng; Wang Lei; Richard Low; Tony Koh Beng Hoe; Marcus Chin; Yoo Ah Min; John Cheng; Wang Lei; David Bala; Seth Ang
- Cinematography: Wong Choon Fatt
- Edited by: Yim Mun Chong
- Music by: Long Soo Ming; Benny Wong; Teng Kim Lian; Wayne Ong Khang Wee
- Production company: Neo Studios
- Distributed by: Golden Village
- Release date: 13 August 2009
- Running time: 106 minutes
- Country: Singapore
- Languages: Mandarin; English; Hokkien
- Budget: $782,640
- Box office: S$1,851,720

Where Got Ghost? (traditional Chinese: 嚇到笑; simplified Chinese: 吓到笑; pinyin: Xià Dào Xiào) is a 2009 Singaporean anthology comedy horror film directed by Jack Neo and Boris Boo. This film is Neo's first attempt with horror flicks.

== Plot ==
Roadside Got Ghost

Swindlers Lee Ah Cai (or simply Cai), Fu and Shou are returning to Cai's house after a successful scam under a guise of a religious priest. Cai becomes hungry and tells his accomplices to buy him some food and fruits while he returned home. As it is late at night and they are too lazy to walk to the shops upon realizing that they forgot to buy fruits, Fu and Shou decide to steal some oranges from the roadside, placed there as offerings during the Hungry Ghost Festival. Cai eats the oranges and complains that they are tasteless. Meanwhile, Cai receives a phone call claiming that he won a first-class return ticket to the United States from a lucky draw, which Cai scolded the caller and hanged up the call.

Later, the three men devise a new scheme - they would make phone calls from the phone book and each person they called would receive a random 4D lottery number, with enough calls to cover every possible combination from 0000 to 9999. Those who win the lottery are required to pay 20% commission to Cai under a guise of a temple construction or fall victim to harassments from loansharks and thugs. This initially works and the three set up a company, which was largely successful and trio suggested to apply for copyright protection for their hotline company or else someone will imitate their trick.

One day, Cai receives a phone call after planning to expand their business overseas. The caller gives Cai a lottery number, deploying the same hotline trick. Believing him to be a copycat, Cai naturally disregards the call, scolding Fu and Shou for not acquiring the copyright protection but goes ahead and tries his luck with the given number anyway. To his surprise, he wins first and second prize for the same number and received another call, also from the same caller but again Cai disregard the call.

After claiming the lottery prize with his two sidekicks, a mysterious pale-faced man suddenly confronts Cai for his commission, saying that it was his grandmother who gave Cai the fortune. After teasing the man and refusing to pay, Cai receives the warning that he will be run over by a car. Cai laughs it off and runs into the middle of the road to prove it is all a hoax scare until he gets crushed by a car overturning from an overhead highway. As Cai dies, the driver of the car is revealed to be an elderly female spirit who tells Cai never to steal her oranges again. In the ending scene, hundreds of oranges start to roll onto a dying Cai in the middle of the road.

The episode ends with the phrase "The disasters in life begin from ignoring the details" (人生中的災難 都是由忽略細節開始).

Forest Got Ghost

3SGs Nan and Lei are attending their NS army reservist topographic training and had to trek through a jungle to reach a checkpoint using a map. Along the way, they become lost and decide to take a shortcut through a supposedly haunted jungle, where they find the gravestone of a young woman in the middle of nowhere. After night falls, the two soldiers notice a woman in a red dress watching them from a distance, which frightened them.

Nan and Lei found the shortcut their commanding officer told about in the next morning. After running out of water, they meet a plump girl named Yin Yin with a white umbrella selling drinks and sought refuge at her house. There, they encounter the woman in the red dress again after a peeping attempt, and run for their lives, and later they got trapped nearby a gravestone revealed to be Yin Yin's. Yin Yin catches up with them after a while and explains that it was her, and not a ghost, and the owner of the grave was her twin sister, that they saw back in the house. She persuades them to return to her house, making them feel more comfortable by performing magic, which she claimed to learn from her father, who was a magician and David Footballfield's (David Copperfield) alleged mentor. After a demonstration, Nan and Lei allow themselves to be strapped to chairs and noosed so they can learn one of Yin Yin's magic tricks.

However, it was a trap. The two men are left hanging on a tree outside the house, as the two girls, Yin Yin and the other female ghost, are ready to depart now that they have found two people to take their place. As an epilogue, the story skips to the following year where another batch of soldiers arrives for reservist training. Once again, two of them get lost and take a shortcut. The story ends with them wandering through the forest and stopping in front of Nan and Lei.

The episode ends with the phrase "Be prepared to face consequences if taking shortcuts" (要走捷徑 就得準備付出代價).

House Got Ghost

Serving as a short sequel to Money No Enough 2, it is the Seventh Lunar Month or Hungry Ghost Festival and Baohui, Baohuang and Baoqiang all pay respects to their deceased mother Mother Yang. They complain bitterly to Mother Yang that they are doing poorly financially, and that she is not assisting them supernaturally. After that, they discussed and planned to seek financial assistance from the government (which was later ruled out due to approval complications), and later, Baohuang's friend, who was a wealthy Datuk from Kuala Lumpur. Soon afterwards, however, strange things begin to happen at their respective homes. The three brothers all claim to see or hear Mother Yang on numerous occasions - Baohuang and Baoqiang whilst sleeping and Baohui whilst trying to fix the television signal.

One day, they encounter their good friend whose mother died in the morning, and who has since become wealthy. Assuming that parents dying in the night will bring bad luck, Baohuang and Baoqiang overrule Baohui and urge him to bring their mother's tablet to a temple. Baohui then attempts to bring their mother's tablet to a temple, but is shocked to find it reappearing in his car later. He immediately calls his brothers to accompany him, but they think he is overreacting.

During a car journey to Kuala Lumpur, the ghostly apparition of their mother suddenly appears on the road before them, causing Baohuang to swerve and nearly crash off a cliff. Fortunately, the brothers manage to crawl out unscathed. As they wonder over their mother's sudden appearance, they witness a massive landslide along the road ahead, leading to them realizing that by causing them to swerve, their mother actually saved their lives.

In the epilogue, the three brothers reclaim their mother's tablet from the temple, and encounter the same wealthy friend, who now has cancer and wails that his mother did not bless him well. As the three drive home, now having realized the true fortune that their mother had brought - health, peace, and safety - Mother Yang's spirit appears above, smiling, and waves to the audience.

The episode ends with the phrase "When you have health and safety, do you think it is coincidental?" (當你擁有健康和平安時 你以為是巧合嗎？)

== Cast ==
Part 1: Roadside Got Ghost

- Richard Low as Lee Ah Cai (or Cai)
- Tony Koh Beng Hoe as Fu
- Marcus Chin as Shou
- Yoo Ah Min (Lao Zabor, literally "Old Woman")

Part 2: Forest Got Ghost

- John Cheng as Reservist 3SG Nan
- Wang Lei as Reservist 3SG Lei
- David Bala as MWO Muthu, Regimental Sergeant Major
- Seth Ang as LTA H U Ang, Officer Commanding

Part 3 : House Got Ghost

- Henry Thia as Yang Baohui
- Mark Lee as Yang Baohuang
- Jack Neo as Yang Baoqiang
- Anna Lin Ruping as Lin Xiuyun, Baohui's Wife
- Vivian Lai as Zhou Yanyan, Baohuang's Wife
- Choo Lingling as Zhang Lingling, Baoqiang's Wife
- Natalli Ong Ai Wen as Stella Yang, Baoqiang's daughter
- Lai Meng as Mother Yang, Mother of Baohui, Baohuang and Baoqiang
- Wang Lei as Wealthy friend of Baohui, Baohuang and Baoqiang

== Production ==
Roadside Got Ghost and Forest Got Ghost are directed by Jack Neo while House Got Ghost was directed by Boris Boo.

== Critical response ==
Calvin McMillin of LoveHKFilm.com wrote that "“Roadside Got Ghost” is perhaps the least scary film in the anthology" but "the film is quite funny" and "feels less generic thanks to its Singapore-centric plot.". For Forest Got Ghost, he felt that "Story-wise, “Forest Got Ghost” is probably the weakest, as it basically amounts to a number of strung together “scary situations” that culminate in a finale that is far darker than you might expect" but "those “scary situations” are quite hilarious thanks to the film’s oddly likeable, if cowardly protagonists." He commented that "“House Got Ghost” is probably the most polished and consistently enjoyable of the three stories, but its moral is also the most problematic.". Overall, McMillin felt that "its local focus to be a refreshing change from more generic horror tales with fairly interchangeable characters, plots, and locales."

Loong Wai Ting of Cinema Online wrote that "this Singaporean addition is best described as funny, entertaining and tear-jerking at the same time."

== See also ==
- The Ghosts Must Be Crazy
- Greedy Ghost
- Money No Enough 2
