= The Best Bet =

- Directed by: Jack Neo
- Screenplay by: Jack Neo
- Story by: Jack Neo; Boris Boo
- Produced by: Chan Pui Yin; Titus Ho
- Starring: Richard Low; Mark Lee; Christopher Lee; Chen Liping; Joanne Peh
- Cinematography: Michael Chua
- Edited by: Lawrence Ang; Loh Hwee Ling
- Music by: Li Yi; Redwan Ali
- Production companies: Raintree Pictures; UD Concepts
- Distributed by: United International Pictures
- Release date: 9 June 2004
- Running time: 115 minutes
- Country: Singapore
- Languages: Min Nan (Hokkien) & Mandarin
- Budget: S$1.5 million
- Box office: over S$2.5 million

The Best Bet (Chinese: 突然发财; pinyin: Túrán Fācái; Pe̍h-ōe-jī: Tu̍t-jiân-hoat-châi) is a Singaporean comedy film written and directed by Jack Neo and distributed by MediaCorp Raintree Pictures. The film stars Richard Low, Mark Lee, Christopher Lee, Chen Liping and Joanne Peh.

Released in cinemas on 9 June 2004, The Best Bet earned over S$2.5 million. The film was nominated for Best Original Film Song at the 2004 Golden Horse Awards.

The film portrays the lives, struggles and adventures of three friends who are addicted to gambling. They place a joint 4D bet; when they win, one is tempted to keep all the winnings to himself. This satirical comedy touches on gambling addiction and the consequences of one's actions.

The success of the film spawned a television series of the same name which aired on MediaCorp Channel 8 in April 2005 and ran for 14 episodes. Four of the five lead actors except Joanne Peh continued to star in the television series. Several other new actors were added to the leading cast including Dai Qianyun as Mark Lee's idolizer, and Cheryl Chin as Mark Lee and Christopher Lee's love interest.

== Plot ==
Tan Chun Huang, a Bak kut teh stall owner, often leaves the stall to his sister Huimin to meet his bookie friends, 4D King and 4D Liang. Huimin disapproves of his gambling habits and neglect toward the soup's quality. Meanwhile, Lee Yong Shun loses his job, and his assistant Richard Huang's proposal is rejected. Their coworkers approach them to buy Anita Mui’s 4D number as Huang can help to make 4D bets with an illegal bookie, frustrating Shun, who warns against gambling. Shun is then caught running a red light by a traffic camera and destroyed it in a fit of anger.

At a hawker center, a fake monk performs a stunt revealing the number 3791 before being arrested for scamming people. Though Tan, who sidelined as an illegal bookie, dismisses it as a scam but took in bets for the number and never placed the bets. The number later wins both first and second prize on the next draw, resulting Tan to borrow $15,000 from loan sharks to pay out to those who betted with him.

At home, Richard's wife criticizes his gambling, especially after a neighbor wins the lottery and upgrades their home while Richard gains nothing. Lee and his partner Evita argue over spending, particularly after Lee prepares to move his mother in. Huang introduces two Chinese friends to Lee, helping Lee to rent them a room to cover expenses. In return, Huang asked for numbers to bet on 4D and was rejected by Lee and instead Lee suggested to run a business together.

Together with Tan, Huang and Lee decided to sell mango desserts and obtained a loan from a bank to open a store. On the opening day, a police raid occurs and arrested Lee for vandalism (for destroying the traffic camera), Lee's tenants and lion dancers, who were illegal immigrants. In the process, a gas explosion ruins the stall. Evita broke up with Lee after the arrest and the business was destroyed with the explosion.

Back home, Huang sees a vandalized neighbor's flat, victim of loan sharks. Later, Tan is warned by his bookie contacts about police crackdowns. They lend him an additional $25,000, bringing his debt to $40,000. During a police ambush, Tan is arrested after attacking an officer. He is sentenced to 30 months in jail but was granted bail to see his family before serving his sentence. Tan lied to his family that he is travelling to China for work instead.

In jail, Tan reunites with Lee and the fake monk where they guess a number from the fake monk's actions. Huang visits and is urged by Tan to bet on 7272, promising to split the winnings. Despite needing the money for medical bills, Huang gives in. Unable to bet with Singapore Pools, the state-owned lottery company, due to buying limits, Huang turns to another bookie to place the bet.

The number wins first prize and Huang receives $400,000. Though he initially plans to share, Huang and his wife decide to lie to Lee and Tan that he had failed to place the bet and keep the winnings. While living a comfortable life, Huang grows close to Susan, a hairdresser. After hearing of a murder related to illicit 4D winnings, he panics and discovers his wife has gambled the money away. After Lee and Tan are released from prison, they confront Huang and demand their share. When Huang denies winning, they kidnap Susan to lure him out. Huang confesses his affair and goes to rescue her. At the hideout, he admits to winning and then losing the money, before waking from the entire sequence as a nightmare.

In reality, Huang visits Lee and Tan and tells them they did win, but the money is gone. Upon their release, they're invited to an empty Bak kut teh restaurant. Huang reveals he invested the winnings to open a restaurant as co-founders and with Tan as the chef of the restaurant to help him quit gambling. Tan becomes a professional chef, and the trio successfully expands the business, opening their eighth outlet at Jurong Point.

== Cast ==
The characters of the movie were played by the following actors and actresses:

- Richard Low as Richard Huang
  Huang is a white-collar worker and later retrenched and eventually became a taxi driver and a father of two children with a habit on often purchasing 4D but to no success which led to his wife (played by Chen Liping) to stop him from purchasing 4D. His son (played by Ashley Leong) had asthma and also like fortune-telling, and his daughter was a primary school student.
- Mark Lee as Tan Chun Huang
  A chef who operates a Bak kut teh store and bookmaker with a compulsive obsession on gambling, and often display atrocious attitude towards Huimin whenever she reminds him to stop gambling.
- Christopher Lee as Lee Yong Shun
  A white-collar worker who got retrenched and later became a taxi driver. Sometimes also arrogant towards civil servants and hardly gambles, but was an entrepreneur.
- Joanne Peh as Tan Huimin
  The younger sister of Huang who also operates a Bah kut teh store and a fresh university graduate. Sometimes innovative in the ideas but criticises Huang about his compulsive gambling habits which could use it on the right places.
- Corinne Adrienne as Evita
  Then-girlfriend of Lee who was jealous on their friends luxuries and spendthrift. While most of the time seldom speaks Chinese like most of the cast, she was strict towards Lee on the actions and tends to throw tantrums whenever she dislikes which resulted in the loss of the relationship. Though never mentioned on her appearance after the break, she do make a cameo appearance at the ending as an audience member.
- Yoo Ah Min (credited as 'Lao Zha Bor') as Coffee-aunt
  Huang's friend and former colleague who is also a bookie running under the private 12 sticks gambling system.
- Tony Koh Beng Hoe as Fatty
  A stallholder and a friend of Tan, who runs a neighbouring stall selling chicken rice.
- Margaret Lee as Susan
  A salonist and massage parlor running in a salon and Huang's love interest which resulted in a private affair. While not explicitly mentioned her actual name, the name of Susan was revealed towards the end of the fantasy when his wife caught him having affair and reveals that she was kidnapped by their friends.
- John Cheng (credited as Ah Nan) as 4D King
  A bookie and friend of Tan.
- Wang Lei as 4D Liang

Additional cast includes See Bok Koon (credited as Mr Funny) who plays as the fake monk revealed a swindler and Steven Woon as Chicken King. Radio DJ anchors Violet Tan of Love 97.2FM and Lin Lingzhi of YES 933 played a role as announcers for the respective 4D drawings, and Capital 95.8FM's Wang Di Cong and NewsRadio 938's (now called CNA938) Anisa Hassan (both uncredited) as reporters for the family murder news article. Director Jack Neo appears during the opening titles portraying as an animated singing banknote, the pager voice for the police during the raid scene, and he briefly made a cameo appearance during the ending at Jurong Point as an audience member.

== Production ==
In 1996, director Jack Neo became a gambling addict and spent over S$1,200 a month on 4D bets. Frustrated with losing money and feeling dependent on the gambling, he successfully kicked the habit in 1999 with the support of his wife. As the release of the film coincided with an ongoing debate on whether to set up a casino in Singapore, Jack Neo commented that "we should warn people about the ills of gambling, because it is always a cycle."

When writing the script, Jack Neo decided to change his style, reducing the amount of comedy in the film, and adding more drama. However, after negative feedback from focus groups and concerns from the Board of Film Censors that The Best Bet promoted illegal gambling and the speaking of dialects, he reversed his decision.

The Best Bet was produced by Raintree Pictures on a budget of S$1.5 million. Besides writing and directing, Jack Neo composed the songs, together with Mark Lee, who sang them. The production crew included Daniel Yun as executive producer, Titus Ho and Chan Pui Yin as producers, Michael Chua as cinematographer and Mo Ju Li as music and sound director.

Filming started on 4 March 2004 and finished on 28 April 2004. On the first day of filming, Jack Neo, Daniel Yun and the lead actors participated in a prayer ceremony at the hawker centre in Ang Mo Kio Avenue 10. As 59 people had placed winning bets at nearby 4D outlets, Jack Neo commented that "this place is very wang (lucky) and this matches my movie."

== Reception ==
The Best Bet earned S$170,000 during its sneak preview, and over S$2.5 million during its cinematic release, breaking the record for the largest opening day gross for a local film in the process.

The film screened at the Asian Film Festival and received a nomination for Best Original Film Song at the Golden Horse Awards 2004, but lost to Splendid Float.
