= Street Angels (1999 film) =

- Film poster
- Directed by: David Lam Tak-luk
- Written by: David Lam Tak-luk; Wong Kai-Kee
- Produced by: Chan Chi Ming
- Starring: Grace Yip; Melody Chen; Nicholas Tse
- Cinematography: Ardy Lam
- Edited by: Yeung Yiu-Chung
- Music by: Redwan Ali
- Production company: ACT Venture
- Release dates: 23 September 1999 (Singapore); 4 May 2000 (Hong Kong)
- Running time: 96 minutes
- Country: Singapore
- Languages: Hokkien; English; Mandarin

Street Angels (Chinese: 少女党) is a 1999 Singaporean drama film directed by David Lam Tak-luk.

== Cast and roles ==
- Grace Yip
- Melody Chen
- Nicholas Tse
