= Jack Neo =

Singaporean comedian and director

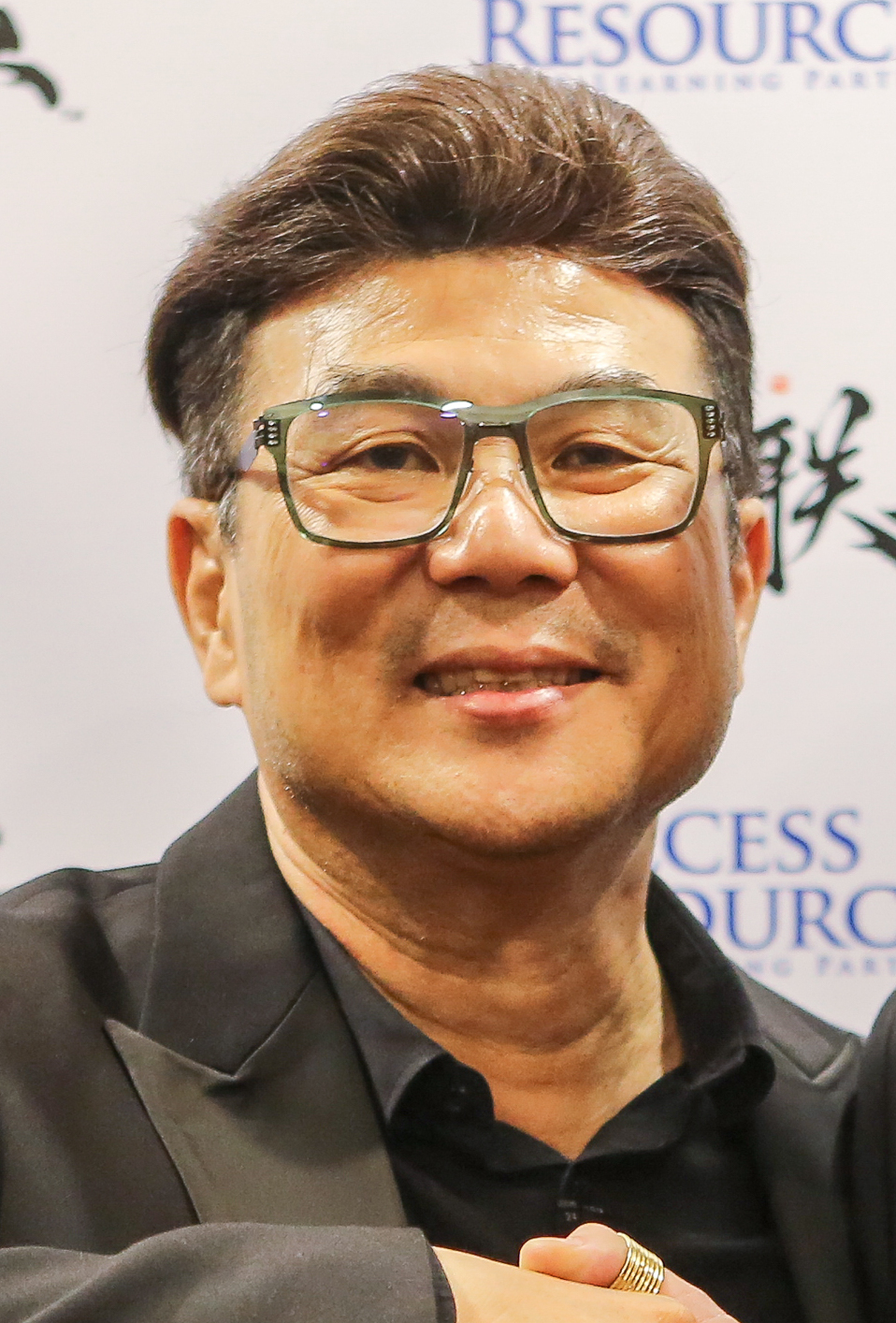
- Neo in 2018
- Born: Jack Neo Chee Keong; January 24, 1960 (age 66)
- Education: Tanjong Katong Secondary School
- Occupations: Film director; film producer; screenwriter; host; comedian; actor
- Spouse: Irene Kng (m. 1990)
- Children: 4

Chinese name
- Traditional Chinese: 梁志強 (also 梁智強)
- Simplified Chinese: 梁志强 (also 梁智强）
- Hanyu Pinyin: Liáng Zhìqiáng
- Hokkien POJ: Niû Chì-Kiông

Jack Neo Chee Keong PBM (born 24 January 1960) is a Singaporean filmmaker, comedian and actor who was a full-time Mediacorp artiste from 1983 to 2003. In the 1990s and early 2000s, he was best known for his cross-dressing roles, as "Liang Po Po" (literally: "Granny Liang") and "Liang Xi Mei" (a woman homemaker in her 40s) in the long-running television comedy show Comedy Nite (搞笑行动).

Since his debut as a feature film director, Neo has been one of the most commercially successful local directors who has also met with some success in Malaysia and Taiwan. He has shown a penchant for franchise series films. His most critically acclaimed film is I Not Stupid, which satirizes Singapore's streaming educational system in 2002. Critics have commented that his films had too much product placement which he justified by stating the expensive cost of making movies in Singapore.

He is known for his many collaborations with fellow actors Mark Lee and Henry Thia, who were both "discovered" by Neo during Comedy Nite.

== Career ==
Neo wrote and acted in a comedy skit for Tanjong Katong Secondary School at the age of 14.

Neo started his career on television in 1980 and became one of the most successful and recognisable celebrities in SBC for his comedic roles on both film and television. His two most notable cross-dressing roles on film and television are Liang Po Po and Liang Xi Mei, both skits in the long-running comedy variety show Comedy Nite. Neo made his directorial debut in That One No Enough (1999) and he set up his own artiste management company, J Team Productions, whose members include comedians Mark Lee and Henry Thia, where the trio worked together in Comedy Nite and also in movies such as Money No Enough, That One No Enough, Money No Enough 2, Where Got Ghost?, The King of Musang King and Money No Enough 3.

Neo's films satirise several aspects about Singapore in comical ways, including societal issues such as negligent parenting and school corporal punishment, and foreign issues such as the water disputes between Singapore and Malaysia. Apart from his film and TV career, Neo has also recorded and produced a number of albums.

Neo received the Best Director Award at Singapore International Film Festival's Silver Screen Awards in 1998 for his short film, Replacement Killers, which led to him filming Hitman in the City in the same year as an extension of the original short film. Since then, he became a filmmaker and created his first film, Money No Enough, directed by Tay Teck Lock and released into cinemas on 7 May 1998. The following year Neo was awarded with Mediacorp's Lifetime Achievement Award in recognition of his contributions to Singapore's media industry. In 2004, Neo became the first filmmaker in Singapore to be honoured with the Public Service Medal. He also received the Cultural Medallion on 21 October 2005 together with musician Dick Lee.

In 2008, Neo and Mark Lee bought the Singapore master franchise rights for Old Town White Coffee, a coffee retail concept from Ipoh, Malaysia. Their first store at Big Splash opened on 30 March in that year.

In 2013, Neo announced the creation of J Team Academy, an educational institute which aimed to bring together industry experts to groom new film-making talent. The academy opened on 6 April 2013. In September, Neo won the Best Actor award for his role in Homecoming (2011) at the 1st Golden Wau Awards, aimed at promoting Chinese-language Malaysian films.

In October 2014, the Madame Tussauds Singapore museum unveiled a wax figure of Neo.

2015 saw the release of Neo's short film as part of the omnibus 7 Letters to commemorate Singapore's 50th year of independence. Malaysian censors took offence with Neo's segment when it was submitted to them for a screening at Kuala Lumpur's Titian Budaya Festival. They initially requested a cut to the vulgar phrase in Cantonese, "curse your whole family", but a successful appeal was made by organisers CultureLink.

Neo released the first two parts of his planned four-part film on the transition from village life to government housing in the first quarter of 2016, Long Long Time Ago and Long Long Time Ago 2.

In 2026, Neo received the Singapore Film Society's Lifetime Achievement Award. He also announced the creation of Ah Boys To Firemen, set for release in 2027 during Chinese New Year.

== Personal life ==
Neo married Irene Kng in 1990 and have three sons and a daughter.

In March 2010, a two-year-long extramarital affair between Neo and freelance model Wendy Chong was publicised and Neo admitted to the affair. Chong, who played a minor role in Neo's 2008 film Money No Enough 2, claimed that Neo initiated the affair. Neo later attempted to end the affair but Chong threatened to hurt herself and the exposé caused much debate and discussion within Singapore.

On 9 March 2010, additional reports were released about Neo having or attempting extramarital affairs with up to 11 women. He tried to ask actress-host Foyce Le Xuan and French student Maelle Meurzec for sexual favours when they were working with him. Foyce, who went to the same church as Neo, claimed that she was advised by her City Harvest Church pastor to cease talking to the media, as Neo's pastor was trying to counsel him and his wife after his affair became public. On 11 March, Neo and Kng held a five-minute press conference, in which Neo admitted his mistake and asked the media to let him off.

Subsequently, his endorsement deal with Mitsubishi Electric Asia was dropped and TV advertisements featuring the director were taken off air. Other advertisers, such as Bee Cheng Hiang and Goh Joo Hin, initially adopted a "wait-and-see" attitude, but otherwise similarly dropped all endorsement deals.

== Filmography ==
=== Film ===
Year	Title	Director	Writer	Producer	Actor	Role	Notes	Ref
1997	12 Storeys	No	No	No	Yes	Ah Gu		
1998	Replacement Killers	Yes	Yes	No	No	—N/a	Short film	
1998	Hitman in the City	Yes	Yes	No	Yes	Thailand Drug Trafficker/Hong Kong assassin	Direct to video, Narrator, Cameo	
1998	Money No Enough	No	Yes	No	Yes	Chew Wah Keong		
1999	Liang Po Po: The Movie	No	Yes	No	Yes	Liang Po Po/Liang Xi Mei		
1999	The Mirror	No	No	No	Yes	James		
1999	That One No Enough	Yes	Yes	No	Yes	Hong Haoren		
2002	I Not Stupid	Yes	Yes	No	Yes	Mr. Liu		
2003	Homerun	Yes	Yes	No	Yes	Mr. Tan, Beng Soon's father	Cameo	
2004	The Best Bet	Yes	Yes	No	No	—N/a		
2005	I Do, I Do	Yes	Yes	No	Yes	Member of Parliament Neo	Cameo	
2005	One More Chance	Yes	Yes	No	Yes	Reporter Ou Yang Feng	Cameo	
2006	I Not Stupid Too	Yes	Yes	No	Yes	Mr Yeo		
2007	Just Follow Law	Yes	Yes	No	Yes	Medical Doctor	Narrator, Cameo	
2008	Ah Long Pte Ltd	Yes	Yes	No	Yes	Music Composer	Cameo	
2008	Money No Enough 2	Yes	Yes	No	Yes	Yang Baoqiang		
2009	Where Got Ghost?	Yes	Yes	No	Yes	Yang Baoqiang		
2009	Love Matters	Yes	Yes	No	No	—N/a		
2010	Being Human	Yes	Yes	No	Yes	Waiter	Cameo	
2011	The Ghosts Must Be Crazy	No	Yes	Executive	No	—N/a		
2011	Homecoming	No	No	No	Yes	Karen Neo		
2012	We Not Naughty	Yes	Yes	No	No	—N/a		
2012	Ah Boys to Men	Yes	Yes	No	No	—N/a		
2013	Ah Boys to Men 2	Yes	Yes	No	Yes		Cameo	
2013	Everybody's Business	No	No	Executive	Yes	Man in toilet / Toilet announcement in Chinese (voice)	Cameo	
2014	The Lion Men	Yes	Yes	No	No	—N/a		
2014	The Lion Men: Ultimate Showdown	Yes	Yes	No	No	—N/a		
2015	Ah Boys to Men 3: Frogmen	Yes	Yes	No	Yes		Cameo	
2015	My Papa Rich	No	No	No	Yes	Pokok Lim		
2015	7 Letters - Segment "That Girl"	Yes	Yes	No	No	—N/a		
2016	Long Long Time Ago	Yes	Yes	No	Yes		Cameo	
2016	Long Long Time Ago 2	Yes	Yes	No	No	—N/a		
2017	Take 2	No	No	Executive	No	—N/a		
2017	The Fortune Handbook	No	No	Executive	No	—N/a		
2017	Lucky Boy	No	No	Executive	Yes		Cameo	
2017	Ah Boys to Men 4	Yes	Yes	No	No	—N/a		
2018	Wonderful! Liang Xi Mei	Yes	Yes	No	Yes	Liang Xi Mei / Liang Po Po		
2019	Make It Big Big	No	No	No	Yes	Himself	Cameo	
2019	Killer Not Stupid	Yes	Yes	No	No	—N/a		
2019	When Ghost Meets Zombie	No	No	No	Yes	"Mr Perfect" audition judge	Cameo	
2020	The Diam Diam Era	Yes	Yes	No	No	—N/a		
2021	The Diam Diam Era Two	Yes	Yes	No	No	—N/a		
2022	Ah Girls Go Army	Yes	Yes	No	Yes	Mr. See	Cameo	
2022	Ah Girls Go Army Again	Yes	Yes	No	No	—N/a		
2022	Deleted	No	No	No	Yes	Wu Haisen		
2023	The King of Musang King	Yes	Yes	No	Yes	Wang Mao Shan		
2024	Money No Enough 3	Yes	Yes	No	Yes	Liang Da Qiang		
2024	I Not Stupid 3	Yes	Yes	No	Yes	Mr. Liu	Cameo	
2025	I Want To Be Boss	Yes	Yes	No	Yes	Ah Keong		
2026	Liang Po Po VS Ah Beng	No	Yes	Executive	Yes	Liang Po Po		
2027	Ah Boys To Firemen	Unknown	Unknown	Unknown	Unknown	—N/a		

=== Television series ===
Year	Title	Role	Notes
2000	Liang Ximei S1 & S2 (再见梁细妹 S1 & S2)	Liang Xi Mei	
2001	The Return Of Liang Popo (梁婆婆重出江湖)	Liang Po Po	
2002	The Return Of Liang Ximei (笑傲江湖梁细妹)	Liang Xi Mei	
2016	Hero	Liang Po Po	Cameo appearance

=== Variety shows ===
Year	Title	Role	Ref
1990-2000; 2003-2004	Comedy Nite (搞笑行动)	Host, co-host with Moses Lim, Liang Po Po, Liang Xi Mei	
2016	Happy Can Already!	Liang Xi Mei	
2017	Happy Can Already! 2	Liang Xi Mei	
2017	Happy Can Already! 3	Liang Xi Mei	
2018	Happy Can Already! 4	Liang Po Po	

== Discography ==
=== Drama soundtracks ===
Year	Drama title	Song title	Notes
2014	118	夠力夠力	Opening theme song
2018	Say Cheese	喜剧收场	Opening theme song

== Awards and nominations ==
Year	Award	Category	Nominated work	Result
1998	Star Awards	Top 10 Most Popular Male Artistes	—N/a	Won
1998	Silver Screen Awards	Best Director	Replacement Killers	Won
1999	Star Awards	Best Comedy Performer	Comedy Night	Nominated
1999	Star Awards	Top 10 Most Popular Male Artistes	—N/a	Won
1999	Star Awards	Special Achievement Award	—N/a	Won
2000	Star Awards	Top 10 Most Popular Male Artistes	—N/a	Won
2001	Star Awards	Top 10 Most Popular Male Artistes	—N/a	Won
2002	Star Awards	Top 10 Most Popular Male Artistes	—N/a	Won
2003	Star Awards	Top 10 Most Popular Male Artistes	—N/a	Won
2013	Golden Wau Awards	Best actor	Homecoming	Won
2016	Star Awards	Best Theme Song	118	Nominated
2018	Star Awards	Top 10 Most Popular Male Artistes	—N/a	Nominated
