= Liang Po Po: The Movie =

- Directed by: Teng Bee Lian
- Screenplay by: Jack Neo
- Produced by: Eric Khoo
- Starring: Jack Neo; Mark Lee; Henry Thia
- Cinematography: Yoke Weng Ho
- Edited by: Lawrence Ang
- Production companies: Mediacorp Raintree Pictures; Zhao Wei Film
- Distributed by: United International Pictures
- Release date: 11 February 1999
- Running time: 100 minutes
- Country: Singapore
- Languages: Mandarin; Hokkien; Cantonese
- Budget: S$800,000
- Box office: S$2.9 million

Liang Po Po: The Movie (梁婆婆重出江湖) is a Singaporean black comedy film directed by Teng Bee Lian in 1999. It starred the comedian and film director Jack Neo himself, who cross-dresses as the titular protagonist, whose name in English is translated as "Grandma Neo".

== Plot ==
The titular protagonist, an 85-year-old woman named Liang Po Po, runs away from her retirement home in search of a new life, believing that she can still contribute to society.

On her first day out, she is robbed by a female gangster named Ah Lian and her comrades. Later, when Liang attempts to work as a gas pump attendant, chaos ensues. She then meets and befriends two gangsters, Ah Beng and Ah Seng, and becomes inadvertently involved in a secret society engaged in criminal activities. Taking advantage of Liang's naïveté, the gang uses her to sell pirated VCDs and collect debts. As a loanshark runner, Liang resorts to stalking, breaking into homes, and employing various harassment tactics, striking fear into the hearts of borrowers and compelling them to repay their loans. Her unexpected success exceeds the loanshark's expectations, but he still underpays the unsuspecting old lady.

As Liang develops a genuine friendship with Ah Beng and Ah Seng, the leader of the secret society, known as Big Boss, decides his gang should be feared and respected. To elevate their image, he hires two consultants from the Hong Kong triads. The consultants scold the gang for their petty crimes and train them to commit more serious offenses, such as gun-running, mass murder, and robbery. The gang members, including a still-clueless Liang, begin carrying out violent attacks on random nights to instill fear in their rivals. The consultants also insist that gang members adopt a more polished appearance, dressing in suits and sunglasses to reflect their new image.

The gang’s sudden surge in violent crimes catches the Singaporean authorities off guard. Despite the growing public threat, the police struggle to identify Big Boss as the mastermind behind it all.

Encouraged by the consultants to expand the gang’s influence into civil society, Big Boss announces his candidacy as an independent politician. His campaign is well received by most, except for a few, most notably Liang Ximei, who appears to know his criminal background. To finance the election, the consultants persuade Big Boss to orchestrate a bank robbery. Impressed by Liang’s previous achievements, Big Boss assigns her to lead the heist, believing no one would suspect an elderly woman and that, even if caught, she would gain sympathy from the authorities.

Ah Beng and Ah Seng discover the plan and attempt to send Liang away for her safety. However, she refuses to abandon her friends and insists on seeing the mission through, unaware of what it truly involves.

Unknowingly armed with a real, loaded gun, Liang brandishes the weapon during the robbery and fires it, shocking the previously complacent bank staff into handing over the money. Although Liang later disputes the amount she stole, the bank reports a much larger sum missing, sparking a nationwide manhunt for the elderly fugitive. Both the authorities and the gang race to find her and retrieve the money first.

While on the run, Liang realizes she has been used by Big Boss and the consultants. With nothing to lose due to her age, she arms herself once more and prepares for a final confrontation. In a climactic showdown with the last remaining consultant, it’s revealed that the gun he is firing is actually a water pistol, ironically the same one he had originally intended to give Liang for the robbery. At that moment, the police arrive and arrest the remaining gang members who haven’t yet fled.

In the aftermath, Ah Beng and Ah Seng, along with Liang, are the only ones who avoid arrest. The three decide to turn over a new leaf. Realizing they can make more money by impersonating an elderly woman selling goods, Ah Beng and Ah Seng dress up as Liang look-alikes and begin a new chapter in their lives.

== Cast ==
- Jack Neo as Liang Po Po/Liang Xi Mei
- Mark Lee as Ah Beng
- Henry Thia as Ah Seng
- Patricia Mok as Ah Lian
- John Cheng as Big Boss
- Ah Niu as gas pump attendant
- Eric Tsang and Sheren Tang as consultants from Hong Kong

In addition, Zoe Tay, Chen Liping, Evelyn Tan, Kym Ng, Robin Leong, and Chris Ho have cameos in the film.

== Production ==
In an interview, Neo claimed that he was inspired by western black comedy films like Beetlejuice and Death Becomes Her to make a Singaporean equivalent. This film was the first produced by Mediacorp Raintree Pictures, and was based on a character created and popularized by a Television Corporation of Singapore (now MediaCorp) television series.

Utilizing a crew of 50, this was the first Singaporean film to feature high-speed chases, as well as choreographed fight scenes involving hundreds of extras.

In an effort to broaden the film's appeal, well-known Hong Kong celebrities Eric Tsang and Sheren Tang, as well as Malaysian singer Ah Niu were cast in supporting, cameo roles.
