= That One No Enough =

- Directed by: Jack Neo
- Written by: Jack Neo
- Produced by: Choo Meileen; Lim Suat-yen
- Starring: Jack Neo; Mark Lee; Henry Thia; Hong Huifang
- Cinematography: Tung Sei-kwong
- Edited by: Martyn See
- Music by: Li Yi
- Production company: Cathay Asia Films
- Release date: 13 May 1999
- Running time: 111 minutes
- Country: Singapore
- Languages: English; Mandarin; Hokkien; Teochew
- Budget: $850,000
- Box office: $1,020,000

That One No Enough (Chinese: 那个不够), is a 1999 Singaporean romance comedy film directed by Jack Neo. The film was Neo's directorial debut, not counting Hitman in the City which was directed for the direct-to-VCD market.

== Plot ==
White-collar worker Hong Hao Ren is a devoted husband, while his ambitious wife, Chow Min Hui, focuses on advancing her career than their relationship. He eventually gets romantically interested with her secretary, Jenny.

Married Ah Beng car salesman Zhu Guo Rong is romantically interested in a karaoke hostess. However, a neighbour spots him with the hostess.

Provision shop assistant Liu Ah Kun falls in love with Chen Hui Yu, the daughter of his boss.

== Cast ==
- Jack Neo as Hong Hao Ren
- Mark Lee as Zhu Guo Rong
- Henry Thia as Liu Ah Kun
- Hong Huifang as Chow Min Hui
- Patricia Mok as Chen Hui Yu
- John Cheng
- Yan Ni as Jenny
- Yoo Ah Min as Hao Ren's mother
- Tan Kheng Hua
- Justina Low as Chan Huay
- Liu Lingling

== Release ==
The movie was released in theatres in Singapore and Malaysia on 13 May 1999. The film was released in Taipei, Taiwan on 12 June. It was the first Singaporean film to be released in Taiwan.

== Reception ==
Derek Elley of Variety gave the film a positive review. Chen Yunhong of Shin Min Daily News gave the film four stars out of five. Elisabeth Gwee of The Straits Times gave the film three-and-a-half stars out of five, writing, "In the face of such risque subject manner, Neo does a good job for a first-time director, managing to pull things off without resorting to crude jokes and tasteless situations." Ernest Luis of The New Paper gave the film a negative review, criticising the use of stereotypes and the humour.
