= Money No Enough =

1998 Singaporean comedy film

- VCD cover for Money No Enough
- Directed by: Tay Teck Lock
- Written by: Jack Neo
- Produced by: J.P. Tan
- Starring: Jack Neo; Mark Lee; Henry Thia; Patricia Mok; John Cheng; Liu Lingling
- Cinematography: Kamis Bin Huri
- Edited by: A. Supranamian
- Distributed by: Shaw Organisation
- Release date: 7 May 1998
- Running time: 98 minutes
- Country: Singapore
- Languages: Hokkien; Mandarin; English
- Budget: S$850,000
- Box office: S$5.8 million

Money No Enough (Chinese: 钱不够用; pinyin: Qián Bù Gòu Yòng) is a 1998 Singaporean comedy film written by Jack Neo, directed by Tay Teck Lock, and produced by JSP films. The movie stars Neo, Mark Lee and Henry Thia as three close and best friends who start a car polishing business together to resolve their financial problems. Released in cinemas on 7 May 1998, the film received mixed reviews from critics but earned over S$5.8 million and was the all-time highest-grossing Singaporean film until 2012. Its success helped revive the Singaporean film industry and pave the way for the emergence of other Singaporean cultural phenomena.

It was followed by a second standalone installment titled Money No Enough 2, which was directed by Neo, and also starring Thia, Lee and Neo himself, and was released on 31 July 2008. A third standalone installment titled Money No Enough 3, was also directed by Neo and also stars Lee, Thia and Neo himself, and was released on 1 February 2024.

== Plot ==
The film features three close and best friends: Chew Wah Keong, a spendthrift white-collar worker; Ah Ong, a general contractor; and Liang Chao Hui, a kopitiam waiter. After an argument with his boss, Keong quits his job but is unable to get another due to his poor command of English, lack of academic qualifications and computer illiteracy. With bills (especially instalments) to pay and a family to support, he goes heavily into debt whereupon his wife leaves him and takes their daughter with her. Ong borrows S$40,000 from loan sharks, and plans to repay them after collecting a debt owed him by a friend who subsequently runs away. The loan sharks beat up Ong for not repaying the loan within the two-week deadline, so he flees to Johor Bahru. Hui, who is single and lives with his elderly mother, wastes his meagre salary on 4D and pursues an insurance agent whom he has a crush on.

In an attempt to resolve their financial problems, the three close and best friends decide to start a car polishing business together with the limited capital they have. However, at the opening ceremony of their business, Hui's mother collapses and is taken to hospital, where she is diagnosed with leukaemia. Hui has three wealthy older sisters, but they refuse to help pay the medical bills, and his application for financial assistance is rejected because of his sisters' high incomes. To compound matters, the loan sharks show up at the company to harass Ong. Ong and Hui ask to cash out their shares so they can pay the loan sharks and medical bills respectively, but all their money has already been spent on equipment and other business running costs. Hui's mother then dies.

At the wake of Hui's mother, which raises ten thousand dollars of bai jin (contributions toward funeral expenses), the loan sharks turn up, pursue Ong and are arrested after a lengthy police chase. Keong convinces his wife and daughter to enter an obstacle race where they win the first prize of S$100,000, which he uses to pay his creditors, and his family is reunited. The car polishing business is successful, and the three friends become the directors of Autoglym Singapore.

== Cast ==
- Jack Neo as Chew Wah Keong
- Mark Lee as Ah Ong
- Henry Thia as Liang Chao Hui
- Patricia Mok as Jojo, Liang Chao Hui's Kopitiam Customer
- John Cheng as the 1st Loan Shark
- Liu Lingling as Liang Chao Hui's 1st and Eldest Sister
- Eileen Wee as Susan, Jojo's Close and Best Friend and Liang Chao Hui's Love Interest
- Tony Kim Ju Gong as Old Chen, Chew Wah Keong's Old Good and Best Friend whom is also the CEO of his owned company
- Ernest Seah as Jeremiah Adolpher Lee, Chew Wah Keong's new employee and later manager of All Lee Enterprise Pte Ltd, later former manager
- Chen Zhao Jin as Chew Wah Keong's Boss of All Lee Enterprise Pte Ltd, later former boss
- Tan Cheng Bee as Chew Wah Keong's Mother
- Zhuo Hui Qin as Chew Wah Keong's Wife
- Inez Goh as Chew Wah Keong's Daughter
- Lim Siew Keng as Liang Chao Hui's 2nd Sister
- Feng Li Ming as Liang Chao Hui's 3rd Sister
- Alex Lee Han Kwan as 2nd Loan Shark
- Sim Gee Sing as 3rd Loan Shark
- Abigail Chay as Abigail
- Henry Wong as Liang Chao Hui's 1st Brother-In-Law
- Chris Tan Hock Hai as Liang Chao Hui's 3rd Brother-In-Law

== Production ==
In the 1990s, Neo, Lee and Thia became well known in Singapore for their performances in the TCS Channel 8 sketch comedy variety show known as Comedy Night/Comedy Nite (Simplified Chinese: 搞笑行动, Wade-Giles: Kao hsiao hsin tung), notably in the Liang Po Po and Liang Xi Mei sketches. Neo then acted in the 1997 Eric Khoo film 12 Storeys, and saw potential in the then virtually nonexistent local film industry. He wrote a screenplay about expatriates in the advertising agency (which was later featured in the 2002 film I Not Stupid) but decided that the concept would not appeal to most Singaporeans, so he thought of writing a story about Ah Bengs (uneducated Chinese men, an example being noticed in the popular Singaporean local sitcom known as Phua Chu Kang Pte Ltd, where the titular character Phua Chu Kang (Gurmit Singh) was an example of an Ah Beng, and a general contractor and white-collar worker as well, just like Lee's and Neo's character Ong and Keong in this film respectively. Phua Chu Kang was also later mentioned by Ben (Hossan Leong) in the 2002 film I Not Stupid whilst talking about the use of Singlish), drawing on the humble backgrounds of Lee, Thia and himself. Inspired, he contacted Tay Teck Lock, a former television director and television producer for TCS Channel 8, and suggested they collaborate. They decided on a plot about 3 Singaporean men whom are close and best friends facing financial difficulties at the same time. Neo spent 8 months writing the script, while Tay helped develop the characters and jokes. Despite the Speak Mandarin Campaign, Neo chose to use Hokkien dialogue to "reflect real life" and "reach a different audience".

This film was produced by JSP Films on a budget of S$850,000. The production crew included Deri Ng as first assistant director, J.P. Tan as film producer, Kamis as cinematographer, A. Supranamian as film editor, Anthony Ng as art director and Abdul Shukar Mohd as sound designer. Filming was plagued by financial problems, such as poor quality shooting equipment. After the Board of Film Censors reviewed and approved the film, distributor Shaw Organisation released the film on 21 screens on 7 May 1998. The success of the movie led to a dispute between Neo and the film producers over their shares of the profits.

== Reception ==
This film earned S$50,000 from sneak previews and S$42,000 on its opening day, then topped the local box office for a month. In total, the film made S$5.8 million, which remained the best box-office showing by a local movie until the record was broken by Ah Boys to Men in 2012. After its box office run, 70,000 VCDs of this film were sold, which remains a record for a Singaporean film. Its success sparked the film career of Neo, who won the Best Director Award at the 1998 Silver Screen Awards, and the development of the Singaporean film industry. 4 more Singaporean movies were produced in 1998, 2 of which were described by critics as copycats of this film. With its use of Hokkien and crude portrayal of Singaporean life, the film is also credited with paving the way for other Singaporean cultural phenomena such as mrbrown and TalkingCock.

The movie received a mixed critical reception with LoveHKFilm.com commending the film as "an effective satire of...Singaporean culture" and noted that the actors "do a credible job representing characters from Singapore's varying social strata", while a Variety review described the movie as "initially fresh and amusing but ultimately too one-note and local in its humor to travel far". Francis Dass of the New Straits Times wrote that Money No Enough was "spot-on" and "funny", but criticised the "clichéd script and the director's penchant for melodrama".

== Sequels ==
To mark its 10th anniversary in 2008, this film was released in cinemas again and was followed by a standalone sequel titled Money No Enough 2, which was released during the National Day period on 31 July 2008. In April 2020, an online live session between Jack Neo and Mark Lee hinted at a possible sequel for this film and Money No Enough 2 and are currently writing the script for the upcoming sequel titled Money No Enough 3. Filming was initially planned to begin in September 2020, but was delayed due to the COVID-19 pandemic in Singapore. Jack Neo stated that the film concept in the third film series would be a departure from this film and the sequel as he implied that people’s perception and concept of money has been changed. Money No Enough 3 is the first film co-produced by Jack Neo under the HiJack Pictures banner − a joint venture outfit formed in 2022 between Neo's J Team productions and distributor-producer Clover Films.

Budgeted at S$2.8 million, Money No Enough 3 was financed by HiJack Pictures and mm2 Entertainment. Production commenced in October 2023 and is scheduled to complete by end of November 2023, with a targeted release during 2024 Chinese New Year holiday season. It was filmed entirely in Singapore. Therefore, eventually, Money No Enough 3 was released during the Chinese New Year period on 1 February 2024.
