= Business partner =

Business term

A business partner is a commercial entity with which another commercial entity has some form of alliance. This relationship may be a contractual, exclusive bond in which both entities commit not to ally with third parties. Alternatively, it may be a very loose arrangement designed largely to impress customers and competitors with the size of the network that the business partners belong to.

== Partnership formation ==
A business partner or alliance can be crucial for businesses. However, businesses can not choose business partners, called business mating, in any way they want. In many instances, the potential partner might not be interested in forming a business relationship. It is important that both sides of the agreement complement each other and have some common ground, for example in management style, mindset, and technology. If, for example, management style would be too different between the firms, then a partnership could be problematic. Kask and Linton (2013) investigate under what conditions business mating (formation) takes place for startup firms seeking business partners.

== Differentiation ==
The meaning of the term is quite different from that implied in partnership, and it is because of the potential for confusion between the two that widespread use of 'business partner' has been discouraged at times in the past.

A business partner can be:

1. A supplier
2. A customer
3. A channel intermediary (such as an agent or reseller), or
4. A vendor of complementary offerings (for example, one party sells the hardware, while the other sells the software)

This is a wider definition than a business alliance.

== Cohesion ==
One example of a business partnership is the "Agility Alliance" originated by Electronic Data Systems. Members of this IT-focused alliance include Microsoft, Oracle Corporation, Sun Microsystems and SAP. This highlights two problems with multi-party partnerships:

- Two of the companies may be partners with a third member of the partnership, but highly aggressive towards each other. (Oracle and SAP compete against each other in the ERP market.)
- One party may be partner to a second party when targeting one market, but competitive against that same company when targeting another market. (Microsoft may be happy to work with Sun when Sun is offering its servers, but far less happy when Sun is proposing OpenOffice.org, in contention with Microsoft Office.)

== Business partner search ==
Business partner search or business matchmaking is the process/service of finding buyers/customers, distributors, licensees, and/or other business partners. This can be provided as a paid service by a commercial organization, or as a free service by the commercial section of a country's embassy/consulate or an association of businesses in a particular area.

Customarily, commercial consideration of this service is a one time fee. The fee for this service depends on the business domain, the volume of business of both partners that will end up in a partnership relation as the result of this service, etc.

== Managing relationships with business partners ==
The collaborative relationships with business partners are oftentimes prone to certain inefficiencies, which are represented by misalignments of either incentives or efforts between the partners. Business actors thus employ various approaches to manage the business relationships and facilitate both cooperation and coordination. Two mostly used mechanisms are legal contracts and social norms (e.g., trust, prior relationships, or continuity of future collaboration).
