= Just Follow Law =

- Directed by: Jack Neo
- Screenplay by: Bon Sek Yeng; Tan Wei Ling
- Story by: Jack Neo; Boris Boo; Michael Woo
- Produced by: Simon Leong; Hazel Wong; Koo Siok Mien
- Starring: Fann Wong; Gurmit Singh
- Cinematography: Ardy Lam
- Edited by: Justina Ee; Martin See
- Music by: Ocean Butterflies Music Pte Ltd
- Production companies: J Team Productions; Innoform Media
- Distributed by: Golden Village Pictures
- Release date: 15 February 2007
- Running time: 112 minutes
- Country: Singapore
- Languages: English; Mandarin; Hokkien
- Budget: S$10.5 million

Just Follow Law (Chinese: 我在政府部门的日子) is a 2007 Singaporean comedy film directed by Jack Neo. The film also features a sing-along session near to the end of the film and everyone was singing the theme song called A Worthy and Useful Person (有用的人) from Jack Neo's earlier popular and successful movie known as I Not Stupid. It also features cast members from popular local English and Chinese Sitcoms Under One Roof, Phua Chu Kang Pte Ltd, Police & Thief, Living with Lydia, Happy Belly, My Grandson, the Doctor, Can I Help You? and Family Combo (Chinese Sitcom), and also from the Singaporean local drama With You and Jack Neo's previous educational movies I Not Stupid and I Not Stupid Too. It also marks the on-screen reunion of Gurmit Singh, Neo Swee Lin and Lim Kay Siu and Henry Thia after their previous collaboration in Phua Chu Kang Pte Ltd, and that they will collaborate again in the future in the movie known as Phua Chu Kang The Movie. Suhaimi Yusof and Silvarajoo Prakasam would later collaborate again in Jack Neo's kampong and HDB Flat movies known as Long Long Time Ago, Long Long Time Ago 2, The Diam Diam Era and The Diam Diam Era Two.

In the film, an events and promotion department director and a blue-collar worker technician swap souls after a freak accident at a fictional government agency Work Allocation Singapore (WAS). It was first released in Singapore on 15 February 2007.

== Plot ==
Tanya Chew (Fann Wong) is an events and promotion department director at a fictional statutory board known as WAS and Lim Teng Zui (Gurmit Singh) is a single father, with a daughter, Xiao Mei, and works as a blue-collar worker technician at WAS as well, along with their assistants Blackjack (Brandon Wong), Bamboo (Suhaimi Yusof), and their advisors Bee Hwa (Lina Ng) and Nancy (Amy Cheng). WAS holds a boardroom meeting led by CEO Alan Lui (Samuel Chong) and directors Eric Tan (Moses Lim) and Lau Chee Hong (Steven Woon). They discuss the planning of an event to welcome Chinese government officials led by Minister Seto and China's Minister of Manpower Chen to a visit to WAS. All departments are briefed, but Chew's arrogance leaves her crew unmotivated to prepare for the day.

A few days prior to the visit, Chew notices a huge clutter of rubbish in the office. Lim and the crew consisting of Blackjack and Bamboo then decide to receiving a stern rebuke from the security guard named Muthu (David Bala) in the process. Aware of the unsightly impression the rubbish creates, Lau tells Chew to conceal it, who in turn gets her crew to do so. Eventually Lim handles the matter by building a temporary wall held together by masking tape when they run out of nails. The plan falls apart as an end-of-visit photoshoot causes the wall to collapse from the excessive weight of people pressed against it, with Minister Seto himself falling into the junk pile.

In a cover up for the accident, a shocked Lui holds an impromptu boardroom meeting to investigate who is responsible for the construction of the temporary wall. Finger pointing lands the blame on Lim, with the committee docking his salary and bonus. An angry Lim confronts Chew in a car chase, resulting in a severe car accident when they both run off the flyover. Lim and Chew, having survived the accident, wake up in the hospital with their bodies swapped. Both are shortly transferred to a mental hospital before consulting a Chinese temple. After they are discharged, they are forced to experience living in each other's lives.

"Lim" learns of his poor living conditions and eventually discovers that Chew's mother, despite being well-fed, collects cans in her free time due to heavy estrangement from her daughter. Taking from Blackjack's advice to the latter to better spend her time on self-improvement, "Lim" takes on skill improvement courses to better provide for Xiao Mei and Chew's mother.

Meanwhile, "Chew"'s negligence and poor performance as a director causes the department to grossly overspend their budget. Lui plans to shut down the department in response. In an attempt to save it from closure, "Chew" and "Lim" plan a Job Fair Exhibition which, after a decision by the board, must operate with a small budget and scale.

Xiao Mei is hospitalized after a traffic accident, and "Lim" had to rely on "Chew"'s savings to pay for her medical bills, calling "Chew" out for neglecting his own daughter after being spoilt by his new lavish lifestyle. Back at the department, "Lim" and "Chew" learn that the Job Fair will take at least three months to organize, due to red tape and lack of information from various ministries. Despite various obstacles, the Job Fair is realized.

On the day of the Job Fair, planned procedures are sabotaged, including a dislodged stage backdrop. Lim boldly chooses to use masking tape to fix the backdrop due to the lack of time, despite the earlier fiasco. Obstacles are dealt with as they appear (including the use of fire extinguishers as a replacement for smoke effects), but a pyrotechnics accident during the final sing-along session causes a building fire. In the chaos, Minister Seto discovers the loose backdrop and dislodges it, providing an improvised exit route for the stage members to escape unharmed. "Chew" valiantly runs back into the burning building to save Xiao Mei, while "Lim" watches Chew's mother break down in tears out of concern for Chew, realising how much she loves her daughter. Lui attempts to claim credit for the loose backdrop, but was foiled by Tan telling the former to "cover up" due to his pants being burnt by the fire. Shortly after the incident, a Board of Inquiry investigation is conducted, with various personnel pushing around the blame of the fire and the various sabotages surrounding it.

"Lim" is awarded the National Creativity Award for inadvertently inventing a fire escape door during the fire. Two months later, WAS was shut down and their respective members go their separate ways. Lui is blacklisted due to his repeated mistakes and various cover ups. Blackjack and Bamboo are interviewed for positions in other companies, with the latter finding out Tiong is now his company's CEO, only to be rejected for his lack of skills.

"Lim" and "Chew" decide to reenact their accident in an attempt to reverse the swap and regain their original bodies. In the mid-credits scene, Chew still behaves like Lim, implying that the attempt to reverse the swap failed. However, they have gotten together and eventually married in order to retain each others' families, living together at Chew’s home along with her mother.

== Cast ==
Cast	Role	Description
Fann Wong	Tanya Chew	Events and Promotion Department Director at WAS
Gurmit Singh	Lim Teng Zui	Blue-Collar Worker Technician at WAS, one of Tanya Chew's Workers and Colleague, later became Tanya Chew's husband
Brandon Wong	睹神 (Blackjack)	One of Tanya Chew's Workers, Lim Teng Zui's Technician Assistant at WAS
Suhaimi Yusof	Bamboo	One of Tanya Chew's Workers, Lim Teng Zui's Technician Assistant at WAS
David Bala	Muthu	Security Guard at WAS
Moses Lim	Eric Tan	Director of WAS, Tanya Chew's 2nd Supervisor, Main Antagonist of the film
Steven Woon	Lau Chee Hong	Director of WAS, Tanya Chew's 3rd Supervisor, 2nd Main Antagonist of the film
Samuel Chong	Alan Lui	CEO of WAS, Tanya Chew's Main Supervisor, 3rd Main Antagonist of the film
Lina Ng	Bee Hwa	Tanya Chew's Main Assistant at Events and Promotion Department at WAS
Amy Cheng	Nancy	Tanya Chew's 2nd Main Assistant at Events and Promotion Department at WAS
Henry Heng	Minister Seto	Minister in charge of Chinese government officials
Grace Ng	小美	Lim Teng Zui's Daughter
Johnny Ng	Finance Department Representative	Finance Director of WAS, Tanya Chew's Supervisor, Minor Antagonist of the film
Silvarajoo Prakasam	Muthu's Supervisor	Security Guard Supervisor
Tony Koh Beng Hoe	Taoist Priest	Daoshi attending to Tanya Chew and Lim Teng Zui
Henry Thia	Taoist Priest Translator	Daoshi Translator from Hokkien to English by attending to Tanya Chew and Lim Teng Zui
Neo Swee Lin	NRT Representative	Department CEO attending to Tanya Chew and Lim Teng Zui
Lim Kay Siu	Ground Transport Authority (GTA) Represensative	Department CEO attending to Tanya Chew and Lim Teng Zui
Hossan Leong	Land Redevelopment Authority (LRA) Representative	Department CEO attending to Tanya Chew and Lim Teng Zui
Selena Tan	Building Management Authority (BMA) Representative	Department CEO attending to Tanya Chew and Lim Teng Zui
Jack Neo	Medical Doctor	A medical doctor attending to Tanya Chew and Lim Teng Zui after their massive car accident

== Production ==
=== Development and writing ===
The development of this film began when Neo pitched the idea of Fann Wong during one of their backstage meetings, though they can't agree regarding the location of the agreement. It was inspired by the then third Prime Minister of Singapore, Lee Hsien Loong's speech at the 2006 National Day Rally about the lack of professionalism among Singaporean workers. Most of the workers completes work on time during evenings and their mentality of staying beyond that time would be like doing as a favour. He hopes to use the movie to highlight the bureaucracy inefficiencies in office.

Originally Neo was not planning to act in the film. He would play the part of the Medical Doctor because of the original actor's unavailability.

=== Filming ===
This film began shooting in high-definition video format starting on 1 February 2006 and ending in March 2006.

== Release ==
It had a strong opening during the Chinese New Year period, earning $421,000 from 35 prints for second place in the chart.

== Reception ==
At the Golden Horse Awards 2007, the film was nominated for Best Original Screenplay and Best Visual Effects, while Singh was one of four nominated for Best Leading Actor. In the future being in the year 2020, Mark Lee is the second Singaporean actor to be nominated in the Best Leading Actor category at Golden Horse Awards for Number 1 after Singh for this film.
