= Take 2 (film) =

- Theatrical release poster
- Directed by: Ivan Ho
- Written by: Jack Neo; Ivan Ho
- Produced by: Jack Neo; Melvin Ang
- Starring: Ryan Lian; Gadrick Chin; Wang Lei; Maxi Lim
- Cinematography: Saravanann
- Edited by: Neo Rui Xin
- Music by: Mo Ju Li
- Production companies: J Team Productions; mm2 Entertainment
- Distributed by: Golden Village Pictures; J Team Productions; mm2 Entertainment
- Release date: January 26, 2017
- Running time: 108 minutes
- Country: Singapore
- Language: Mandarin
- Budget: S$1.2 million
- Box office: S$1.9 million

Take 2 (Chinese: 遇见贵人; pinyin: Yùjiàn guìrén) is a 2017 Singaporean Chinese New Year comedy film directed by Ivan Ho and executively produced by Jack Neo. This marks Ho's directorial debut after being a longtime scriptwriting partner of Neo's, and one of two films distributed by mm2 Entertainment during the Chinese New Year period in 2017, the other being The Fortune Handbook. It also marks the on-screen reunion of Maxi Lim, Gadrick Chin, Wang Lei and Chen Tianwen after their previous collaboration in the Naval Diving Unit movie known as Ah Boys to Men 3: Frogmen. Secondly, it also marks another on-screen reunion of Maxi Lim and Chen Tianwen after their previous collaborations as son and father respectively in the Ah Boys to Men film series including Ah Boys to Men, Ah Boys to Men 2 and Ah Boys to Men 3: Frogmen, and also as disciple and martial arts and lion dance master respectively in the Lion Dance movies The Lion Men and The Lion Men: Ultimate Showdown, but unfortunately, they will be portraying as enemies in this film. Moreover, it also marks another on-screen reunion of Gadrick Chin and Chen Tianwen after their previous collaboration in Mr. Unbelievable, where they also portrayed enemies in the film. Furthermore, it also marks another on-screen reunion of Ryan Lian and Wang Lei after their previous collaborations in Long Long Time Ago, Long Long Time Ago 2 and The Diam Diam Era Two. Also, Gadrick Chin and Henry Thia would later collaborate again in the movie known as The King of Musang King and that Ryan Lian, Maxi Lim, Kanny Theng and Henry Thia would later collaborate again in the movie known as Money No Enough 3.

== Plot ==
On a venture to turn over a new leaf and break away from their past misdemeanours, Ah Hu (Ryan Lian) and his 3 other cellmates consisting of Sha Bao (Gadrick Chin), Mad Dog (Wang Lei) and Jian Ren (Maxi Lim) set up a new Food & Beverage venture selling Japanese Ramen. But being ex-convicts hinder their success and their inability to fit in with society lands them in numerous comical situations. Their clumsiness ultimately causes the business to flounder. Unwilling to give up the good fight and believing that change will bring about a solution, the four friends come up with a new idea; a 3-in-1 tuition centre for students that also provides Food & Beverage and massage services for their parents. Good times don't last when Ah Hu's nemesis, Di Tie (Chen Tianwen), a drug lord, crime boss, loan shark and kidnapper who wanted revenge on Ah Hu and kidnaps his estranged son Ah Guang (Shawn Ho). Having sworn never to fall back to the path of wrongdoings, it is down to Ah Hu and his friends to save his son without weapons, alerting the police officers, and breaking the law. So begins a daring yet entertaining rescue mission.

== Cast ==
- Ryan Lian as Ah Hu
- Gadrick Chin as Sha Bao
- Wang Lei as Mad Dog
- Maxi Lim as Jian Ren
- Chen Tianwen as Di Tie, Ah Hu's old nemesis
- Dennis Chew as Ah Hong
- Henry Thia as Hei Ge, Ah Hu's ex-gang leader
- Charmaine Sei as Ah Yu, Ah Hu's older sister
- Kanny Theng as Joey, Jian Ren's love interest
- Shawn Ho as Ah Guang, Ah Hu's son

== Production ==
=== Pre-production ===
Neo, whose films has been associated with Chinese New Year, said in an interview with The Straits Times that "it's time to give other new film-makers a chance to make their own films". As such, he made Ho, who co-wrote the script for Ah Boys to Men 3: Frogmen, Long Long Time Ago, Long Long Time Ago 2 and the "That Girl" segment of 7 Letters, the director of this film, while he serves as executive producer and provides Ho with directorial advice.

=== Casting and crew ===
Ryan Lian, who portrays Ah Hu in the film, had taken on minor roles for 17 years, and starred as a loan shark and gangster boss named Ah Long in Long Long Time Ago and Long Long Time Ago 2, would be making his debut as the main lead. In order to fully immerse himself in his role of a former convict, Lian would interact with ex-convicts to understand their lives better. According to an interview with the New Paper, he would "eat and talk with them for about three hours (almost every day)", "(watch) the way they behaved, and they would share their life stories".

Wang Lei, who portrays Mad Dog in the film, signed up "without hesitation" because the role mirrors his life experience as a former gambler.

Dennis Chew, who had previously cross-dressed as Auntie Lucy in Paris and Milan, would take on the role of the lady boss of a tuition centre, among 5 other roles. For this role, he had to put on a female bodysuit, which had to be custom made and ordered from overseas. It takes 1 hour and 10 minutes for Chew to finish the costume and makeup.

Shawn Ho, then a final-year student studying for a Higher Nitec in filmmaking at ITE College Central, was approached by the casting directors on the first day of his internship to play Ryan Lian's son named Ah Guang in the film, after they have auditioned many people. In order to prepare for his role, he had to brush up on his Mandarin skills using a personal tutor.

=== Filming ===
Filming started on June 23, 2016, and ended in end July.

== Reception ==
=== Critical reception ===
Rachel Chan of The New Paper rated the film a 3.5 out of 5 stars, feeling that "it is nice to see a heavy topic on ex-convicts being made into a light-hearted film while still keeping the comedic factor and emotions running high".

Boon Chan of The Straits Times rated the film a 2.5 out of 5 stars, feeling that Ho "cannot quite decide if he wants to do a drama or a comedy", and Lian, being the film's lead, "surrounded here by discordant notes, from Dennis Chew in a number of cross-dressing roles to Chen Tianwen as a crazily flamboyant nemesis to a bizarre soundtrack of European songs", drawing the attention away from him.
