= SRJC =

SRJC may refer to:

- Santa Rosa Junior College, a public community college in Santa Rosa, California
- Serangoon Junior College, a former junior college in Hougang, Singapore, now merged into Anderson Serangoon Junior College
