= Ah Long Pte Ltd =

- Directed by: Jack Neo
- Written by: Jack Neo
- Produced by: Sampson Yuen; Chan Pui Yin
- Starring: Fann Wong; Mark Lee; Richard Low; Jack Lim
- Cinematography: Wai Yin Chiu
- Edited by: Yim Mun Chong
- Music by: Mo Ju Li; Benny Wong
- Production company: Mediacorp Raintree Pictures
- Distributed by: Golden Village Pictures
- Release date: 7 February 2008 (Singapore)
- Country: Singapore
- Languages: Mandarin; Cantonese; Dialects
- Budget: S$1.2 million.
- Box office: S$2,115,640

Ah Long Pte Ltd (Chinese: 老师嫁老大; pinyin: Lǎoshī Jià Lǎodà; Wade–Giles: Lao^{3} Shih^{1} Chia^{1} Lao^{3} Ta^{4}; Pe̍h-ōe-jī: Lāu-sai-kè-láu-tōa) is a 2008 action comedy film directed by Singaporean film director Jack Neo, starring Fann Wong and Mark Lee. Co-produced by Mediacorp Raintree Pictures, Scorpio East Pictures and Double Vision (Malaysia), the film was mostly shot in Malaysia, in the city of Kuala Lumpur, with a budget of S$1.2 million. This film is also the seventh collaboration between Mediacorp Raintree Pictures and Jack Neo.

Ah Long Pte Ltd was released in Singapore on 7 February 2008, and in Malaysia on 13 March. Its languages consist of Mandarin (in a heavily Johor-accented version as spoken by Mark Lee), Hokkien and Cantonese.

== Plot ==
Shao He, a prominent triad based in Malaysia, led by its leadership of its de-facto outgoing leader Chen Jun, along with Emperor, Soldier Head, and Wang Lihua. Wang and the gang cross paths with Jojo Fang, a dance trainer, who was beaten by their gang after he criticizes their literacy on their signage before beating a nearby debtor to death, much to his terror about loan sharks, although he dismissed the fact that it was choreography.

Ahead of time, Shao He was monitored by Malaysian police and recently reform their identity through public awareness and commercial branding. This garnered the attention of Hong, the leader of the Qing Long gang, but Wang rebutted to them as she coerce into capitalism and idealism. Furious on her coercion, Qing Long attacked Wang, Emperor and Soldier Head on broad daylight and split paths; Wang eventually ran to one of the dance studios where Wang's mother and Fang were. Fang, with the help of the crowd, the backup dancers, and a security guard, came to stop the attack after Fang seeing one of Qing Long's henchman attacked Wang, forcing Qing Long to retreat.

While the gang are recovering from the battle, Chen reprimanded Wang for her actions that caused the attack, although she refuted due to their gang's safety. Elsewhere, many members from Qing Long were arrested by police following a tipoff, prompting Hong to launch an ambush with Shao He again while Wang and Chen were caught off-guard. While conducting their punishment with her henchmen for failing their duties, she stabbed with her own knife and claimed her responsibility, leading Chen to renounce their gang's mission.

Wang and Fang were married, not long before Chen arrived to interrupt the wedding, but was forced out by Wang's guests, accusing her of freedom of speech. The next day, while Fang and Wang's mother went to toilet, Emperor and Soldier Head warned Wang that the debtors had called the police, with her advising to keep a low profile without using violence, but this warning was short-lived as Fang was again beaten up by her henchmen for intervention and Chen saving her again. Fang was then forced to work with Shao He in return with much success, and later revealed that they were once childhood friends after he accidentally finds a bookmark that was co-written by them.

After Emperor's house was ransacked, Shao He visits Qing Long, accusing them as acts of revenge. After Hong was disappointed on their rivalry between the two, he proposed a soccer match with the losers forfeiting their territories to the winner, using a durian as a ball. Shao He won the duel, but Hong refuse to concede and attacked them with more durians and sugarcanes. The police arrived on the scene, leading their henchmen to flee without arrest and become fugitives.

The couple met with her friends after several days, while having supper, Fang received a phone call that their mothers were abducted by Qing Long; the couple then followed Hong to a hideout where he meet Chen to negotiate about an alliance in exchange of releasing the captives; Chen stabbed Hong while on a phone call, but Wang intervened him before he could deal the final blow with the help of Fang; however, all but Fang were tranquilized and were taken to a secret location.

The person who led the capture was revealed to be one of the victims who lost their parents to loan sharks. She led a team of debtors who seeks revenge to the loan sharks as their purpose of the capture, with a photographer stealthily taking pictures as evidence for their wrongful actions. The debtors left before police arrive for their arrests, resulting in the dissolution of Shao He. Chen was sentenced to death while the rest were given jail sentences.

Ten years later, Wang was released and was reunited with Fang, now working as a salesman in kitchen appliances; they were welcomed by a group of employees as a latest addition along with her henchmen, who were released two years earlier.

== Cast ==
- Fann Wong as Wang Lihua (王立华), the second-in-command of Shao He gang and Fang's eventual wife.
- Mark Lee as Jojo Fang (方佐佐), a fitness dancer and Wang Lihua's eventual husband.
- Richard Low as Chen Jun (陈军), the leader of the Shao He gang.
- KK Wong as Soldier Head (兵头), the first-in-command of the Shao He gang.
- Daniel Tan as Emperor (皇帝), the third-in-command of the Shao He gang.
- Jack Lim as Hong Qinglong 洪青龙, the leader of the Qing Long gang, with a rivalry to Shao He.
- Lai Meng as Wang Lihua's Mother

Other roles include Koe Yeet with an unnamed role credited as "revenge teen", along with Michelle Tay, Marcus Chin as an opera singer, Yoo Ah Min and David Bala; other mentioned roles include Muralitharan Murthy as a photographer, Jovi Theng, as well as Lim Cheer Yong and Tan Jeng Yee, who respectively played the roles as a young Jojo and Lihua. Jack Neo appeared as a cameo in his role as a music composer in advice to Shao He on coming up in their theme song.

== Production ==
Jack Neo feels that most people think that loan sharks are "heartless and evil", however after research, he has found out that there are "kind and caring" loan sharks as well. He was sure that the film would be well received by Singaporeans. The scriptwriting took 6 months to complete, while the film is shot in 35 days. Neo went against the social norm by using a woman as a loan shark (ah-longs were generally male gangsters) and having her propose marriage (which is against traditional Chinese custom).

== Reception ==
A series of roadshows were held at Ang Mo Kio Hub on 19 January 2008.

Ah Long Pte Ltd's commercial success was evident despite mixed reviews from the press. The Straits Times reported on 13 February that over the Chinese New Year weekend, the film reaped a box-office takings of S$1.47 million, coming in second behind Stephen Chow's CJ7 ($2 million), while beating Jay Chou's Kung Fu Dunk ($1.41 million). All three films were released in Singapore on 7 February 2008. Ah Long Lte Ltd broke the previous record for biggest opening weekend for local productions, a record it held until it was broken in 2012 by another Jack Neo film Ah Boys to Men, which earned S$1.509 million on its opening weekend.

The ranking remained the same as of 19 February, when the box-office earnings of CJ7 was almost S$3 million ($2,840,282), Ah Long S$2.4m and Kungfu Dunk at S$1.96m.

Reviews from local magazine 8 Days were largely negative. The film was rated as half a star out of five.

== Criticism ==
Various film reviews indicated that this film had "copied ideas" from Cho Jin-gyu's My Wife Is a Gangster 3. There was also a scene in which Lihua performed soccer tricks, and was pointed out by critics for copying Stephen Chow's Shaolin Soccer.
