= Oppa, Saranghae! =

2023 Singaporean television series

- Promotional poster
- Traditional Chinese: 歐巴，我愛你！
- Simplified Chinese: 欧巴，我爱你！
- Literal meaning: "Oppa，I Love You !"
- Hanyu Pinyin: Ōu bā，wǒ ài nǐ !
- Genre: Fantasy; Romance; Comedy
- Written by: Han Yew Kwang (original concept)
- Directed by: Huang Fenfei
- Starring: Rui En; Kim Jae-hoon; Tasha Low; Mei Xin
- Opening theme: "Wind from the Galaxy" by Kim Jae-hoon
- Ending theme: "Breathe Again" by Serene Koong
- Country of origin: Singapore
- Original languages: Mandarin; Korean
- No. of seasons: 1
- No. of episodes: 13

Production
- Executive producers: Molby Low; Huang Fenfei
- Producer: Chen Shulian
- Cinematography: Zhou Wenxiang
- Editor: Lin Xiubing
- Running time: 46 minutes
- Production company: Wawa Pictures

Original release
- Network: Channel 8
- Release: 12 April – 28 April 2023

Related
- My Love from the Star

Oppa, Saranghae! (Chinese: 欧巴，我爱你！) is a 2023 Singaporean fantasy romance series starring Rui En, Kim Jae-hoon, Tasha Low and Mei Xin. Produced by Wawa Pictures, the series began airing on Mediacorp Channel 8 from 12 April 2023.

== Synopsis ==
A dreamy television character, Do Seo-joon, is pulled out from the television screen by a lonely and single career woman Ouyang Qiqi, and completely changes her life. However, the actual actor is an overbearing star in real life and it forces Qiqi to rethink her choices between reality and fantasy.

== Cast ==
=== Main ===
- Rui En as Ouyang Qiqi
  - Yunis To as young Ouyang Qiqi
- Tasha Low as Shine
- Kim Jae-hoon as Cha Tae-woo / Do Seo-joon
- Mei Xin as Song Jieling

=== Supporting ===
- Darren Lim as Michael
- Lin Ruping as Phoenix
- Patricia Seow Jingqin as Cindy
- Lee Minghao as Kent
- Jazliyana Lee as Eve
- JJ Neo as Jane
- Regina Lim Yunhui as Yumi
- Fiona Fussi as Jeon So-yeon
- Maxi Lim as Ouyang Didi
- Zhang Weiqin as Xiaoqian
- Andrew Lua as Jiaxian
- Brian Kim as Park Kang-joon
- Yang Zhisheng as Harry

=== Special appearances ===
- Zhang Xinxiang as Mr. Chan
- Shaun Chen as Liang Zixuan
  - Benjamin Tan as young Liang Zixuan
- Adam Chen as Lawrence
- Cynthia Koh as Lee Soo-jung
- Ferlyn Wong as Jeon So-yeon version 2.0

== Production ==
Oppa, Saranghae! is the debut appearance of Kim Jae-hoon (also known as KimKim) in a Singaporean television production. A Taiwan-based South Korean actor and singer, Kim also provided the vocals for the Mandarin and Korean versions of the series theme song "Galaxy Wind" (来自星际的风). Filming started in November 2022.

== Soundtrack ==
No.	Song title	Singer(s)
1	《来自星际的风》 (Opening Theme Song)	Kim Jae-hoon (Kimkim)
2	《来自星际的风》 - 韩文版	Kim Jae-hoon (Kimkim)
3	《舞女》	Rui En
4	《舞女》(电音版)	Rui En
5	《Breathe Again》 (Ending Theme Song)	Serene Koong
6	《苹果 (Holiday)》	Celeste Syn

== Awards and nominations ==
Awards	Category	Recipient	Result	Ref.
Asian Academy Creative Awards	Best Drama Series (national winner - Singapore)	Oppa, Saranghae!	Won	
Asian Academy Creative Awards	Best Comedy Programme (national winner - Singapore)	Oppa, Saranghae!	Won	
Asian Academy Creative Awards	Best Theme Song or Title Theme (national winner - Singapore)	"Wind from the Galaxy" by Kim Jae-hoon, XiaoJiu and Zheng Jianxing	Won	
Star Awards 2024	Best Screenplay	Molby Low, Wong Foong Hwee, Han Yew Kwang, Ng Lee Ling, Lum Yic Teng	Nominated	
Star Awards 2024	Best Drama	—N/a	Nominated	
Star Awards 2024	Best Theme Song	"Wind from the Galaxy" by Kim Jae-hoon, XiaoJiu and Zheng Jianxing	Won	
Star Awards 2024	Best Actress	Rui En	Nominated	
Star Awards 2024	MY PICK- Favourite CP	Rui En & Kim Jae-hoon	Nominated	
