= ABC DJ =

- Starring: Eugene Lee; Richard Low; Margaret Lim; Ezann Lee; Deng Mao Hui; Marcus Chin; Subin Subaiah; Vignesh V
- Country of origin: Singapore
- No. of episodes: 13

Production
- Executive producers: Daisy Irani; Hossan Leong
- Camera setup: Single camera
- Running time: 30 minutes (with commercials)

Original release
- Network: MediaCorp Channel 5
- Release: 23 May – 15 August 2006

ABC DJ was a Singaporean sitcom which often makes references to sensitive issues such as culture shock and racial discrimination. It also features guest appearances from the cast members in 2 Singaporean local English sitcoms Phua Chu Kang Pte Ltd and Police & Thief in episode 7. Moreover, this sitcom was also a combination of storylines from popular Singaporean local sitcoms and drama such as Under One Roof, Phua Chu Kang Pte Ltd, Police & Thief, Living with Lydia and Growing Up respectively. Furthermore, this sitcom also bears some similarities with another popular Singaporean sitcom known as Police & Thief, in which both families in that sitcom and this sitcom lived in a Toa Payoh HDB Flat. At the same time, Richard Low and Margaret Lim would also collaborate again in the future as husband and wife in the Singapore's long-running drama known as Tanglin.

== Plot ==
=== DJ (Dong-Jin) and Master Zhang ===
This series is about an American-born Chinese "brat" from Beverly Hills, California named Zhang Dong Jin, also known as Dong Jin or DJ (Eugene Lee), who is a rich, spoilt and almost-worthless Americanized Chinese that was sent or banished to Singapore by his father, Master Zhang, to live with a conservative Chinese family being the Goh family , so that DJ will learn about Chinese culture.

DJ was tricked by his father into going to Singapore. He thought he was in Singapore on a vacation when he received a phone call from his father, explaining to DJ that he had come to Singapore not for a vacation but to live with the Goh family to learn the traditional Chinese culture from them. However, DJ did not adapt well to the Chinese traditions, such as filial piety. During the stay with the Goh family, DJ was often being threatened or bullied by Goh, and his family. DJ was often regarded as a Chinese ang moh, a Singlish term for a Chinese person who lives in the West.

=== The Goh family and others ===
The Chinese family being the Goh family is headed by Goh Boon Keng (Richard Low), who is a chinese doctor and physician and disciple to Master Zhang and a greatest threat to DJ, lives together with his wife, Goh Hwee (Margaret Lim), his two children, Fann Goh (Ezann Lee), a bookworm and Goh Jeng Lo (Deng Mao Hui), who is regarded as a sissy and his old, illiterate and dimwitted father, Goh Ah Kong (Marcus Chin). Boon Keng works in a Traditional Chinese Medicine Shop. Together, the Goh family lived in a Toa Payoh HDB Flat. Ah Kong has an old Indian friend called Gana (Subin Subaiah), a former butcher in a nearby market and hawker centre, who is also as equally illiterate as him. Occasionally, they get into fights and arguments unexpectedly together. Deepak (Vignesh V) is Fann's Indian closest school friend. To DJ, Fann and Deepak are considered as "nerds", an English slang for a stereotypical person who is boring and is not attractive in terms of their appearance and outlook.

== Cast ==
- Eugene Lee as Zhang Dong Jin, an American-born Chinese "brat" from Beverly Hills, California.
- Richard Low as Goh Boon Keng, a Chinese Doctor and Physician who works in his owned Traditional Chinese Medicine Shop, Hwee's Husband and Fann and Jeng Lo's Father.
- Margaret Lim as Goh Hwee, Boon Keng's Wife and Fann and Jeng Lo's Mother.
- Ezann Lee as Fann Goh, Boon Keng and Hwee's Daughter and Jeng Lo's Elder Sister.
- Deng Mao Hui as Goh Jeng Lo, Boon Keng and Hwee's Son and Fann's Younger Brother.
- Marcus Chin as Goh Ah Kong, Boon Keng's Father, Hwee's Father-In-Law and Fann and Jeng Lo's Paternal Grandfather.
- Subin Subaiah as Gana, Ah Kong's old best friend and a former butcher in a nearby market and hawker centre.
- Vignesh V as Deepak, Fann's closest friend in secondary school.

=== Guest Appearances ===
- Gurmit Singh as Phua Chu Kang, the general contractor, white-collar worker and CEO of PCK Pte Ltd (in episode 7).
- Irene Ang as Rosie Phua Chin Huay, Chu Kang's wife who works as his secretary at PCK Pte Ltd and enjoys playing mahjong, purchasing clothes, doing facial and going for slimwrap (in episode 7).
- Ray Kuan as Ah Goon, one of Chu Kang's lazy blue-collar worker laborers at PCK Pte Ltd who is an attractive yet slow-witted who dresses in revealing denim cut-offs all the time (in episode 7).
- Mark Lee as Lee Tok Kong, a former gangster and currently a barber and hairstylist of his owned beauty salon (in episode 7).
- Margaret Lee as Lily Lee, Tok Kong's wife and assistant at her husband Tok Kong's owned beauty salon (in episode 7).

== Production ==
American AZN TV host and Radio DJ Eugene Lee portrays the titular protagonist of the show. Veteran MediaCorp Channel 8 actors Richard Low and Margaret Lim and also Singaporean child actors Ezann Lee and Deng Mao Hui were also portraying the main family being the Goh family of the show. Vignesh V, an actor from Fly Entertainment, were also one of the stars of the show but he only appears in some episodes. In addition, Subin Subaiah were also one of the stars of the show and also appeared in some episodes as well.

Guest appearances such as Gurmit Singh, Irene Ang, Ray Kuan, Mark Lee and Margaret Lee from 2 popular Singaporean local sitcoms Phua Chu Kang Pte Ltd and Police & Thief respectively, have appeared in the 7th episode of this show.

== Episodes ==
#	Airdate	Title
1	23 May 2006	Rock The Boat
2	30 May 2006	Karung Guni Man Always Rings Twice
3	6 June 2006	Singapore Water Torture
4	13 June 2006	School Of Rock
5	20 June 2006	Rock Around The Clock
6	27 June 2006	Dancing Queens
7	4 July 2006	Ship Of Fools
8	11 July 2006	Lucy In The Sky With Diamonds
9	18 July 2006	Little Shop Of Horrors
10	25 July 2006	Love Is A Four Letter Word
11	1 August 2006	War Of The Words
12	8 August 2006	Smells Like Teen Spirit
13	15 August 2006	Birthday Boy
