= Kanny Theng =

Singaporean model, actress and television host

- Born: 10 March 1987 (age 38); Singapore
- Occupation(s): TV Host, Actress, Model, Abstract Artist
- Years active: 2008-present
- Spouse: Desmond Ng (m. 2025)

Kanny Theng (born 10 March 1987) is a Singaporean model, actress and TV Host.

== Career ==
Theng is the brand ambassador for Hakubi White C Sato Pharmaceutical Canada Inc. She was the Star Ambassador and Celebrity Game Master for the game Monster Forest created by Asiasoft Singapore.

Theng also acted in television dramas and films with her most recent appearance in the Chinese New Year film Take 2 as a social worker.

== Personal life ==
Theng married Desmond Ng, an actor, in 2025.

== Filmography ==
=== Film ===
Year	Title	Role	Notes	Ref
2017	Take 2	Joey		
2024	Money No Enough 3	Miss Lim		

=== Television series ===
Year	Title	Role	Notes	Ref
2008	Nanny Daddy	June		
2008	Perfect Cut	Herself	Cameo	
2009	Your Hand In Mine	May		
2010	Priceless Wonder			
