= Theresa Poh Lin Chan =

Deafblind woman in Singapore

- Born: Chan Poh Lin; 9 July 1943; Singapore
- Died: 9 July 2016 (aged 73); Assisi Hospice, Singapore

Chan Poh Lin (9 July 1943 – 6 June 2016), better known as Theresa Poh Lin Chan, was a Singaporean writer and teacher. Born in Singapore, she was known in her youth as "the Helen Keller of Southeast Asia", as, like Keller, Chan was a highly accomplished deaf and blind person. Chan was the subject of a BBC radio documentary and inspired a Singaporean film.

== Early life and career ==
Chan was born the child of a hawker and a waitress. Chan became deaf at 12 and lost her sight at 14.

John Wilson, director of the Royal Commonwealth Society for the Blind, met Chan when he visited Singapore in 1958, and recalled in his 1963 book, Travelling Blind: “She told me she wanted to learn like Helen Keller, to speak English like the Queen of England, to meet everyone in the world.” On his recommendation, Poh was accepted at the Perkins School for the Blind in Massachusetts where she topped the school in Mathematics, became president of the sports club, and learned to dance, ice skate, knit, and horseback ride. In 1961, she fulfilled her dream of meeting Helen Keller in Connecticut.

Chan spent 13 years in the United States and returned to Singapore in 1973 to take care of her aging parents. She became a teacher at the Singapore School for the Blind, but eventually lost the job in 1990.

Chan was the subject of a 1964 BBC radio documentary, Child of the Silent Night: The Story of Chan Poh Lin by Stephen Grenfell. She also starred in the feature film, Be with Me (2005), a Singaporean movie in three parts, which was inspired by her life. Chan is credited as a writer for the film as well, considered because her writings about her life were part of the inspiration for the film.

== Death ==
Chan died on 9 June 2016 at Assisi Hospice from lung cancer. In 2017, she was inducted into the Singapore Women's Hall of Fame. Chan was Roman Catholic.
