= Li Meiling =

Li Meiling may refer to:

- Margaret Lee (Singaporean actress) (born 1970), Singaporean actress
- Tracy Lee (actress) (born 1985), Singaporean actress
- Meiling Li, a character in the anime television series Cardcaptor Sakura
