= Tasha Low =

Singaporean actress and singer (born 1993)

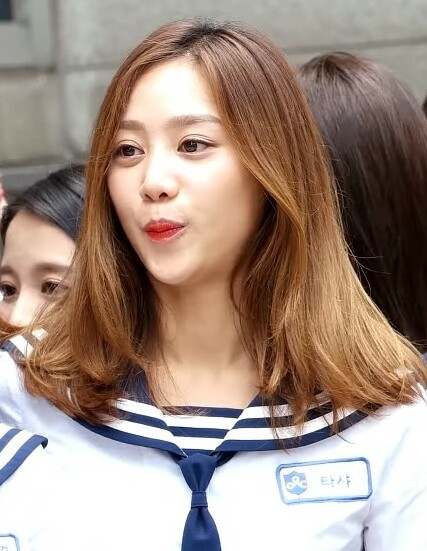
- Low in 2017
- Born: Natasha Low Yi Ling; 11 October 1993 (age 33); Singapore
- Other names: Tasha; Tasha Low; Yu I-yeong (유이영)
- Education: Fuhua Secondary School
- Occupations: Actress; singer; songwriter; television host
- Agents: TCP Artistes; WILD
- Relatives: Sunny Low (grandfather)
- Musical career
- Genres: K-pop; dance
- Instruments: Vocals; beatbox
- Years active: 2012–present
- Labels: CJ E&M; Alpha Entertainment
- Formerly of: Skarf

Chinese name
- Traditional Chinese: 劉怡伶
- Simplified Chinese: 刘怡伶
- Hanyu Pinyin: Liú Yílíng
- Wade–Giles: Liu Iling

Korean name
- Hangul: 유이영
- RR: Yu Iyeong
- MR: Yu Iyŏng

Stage name
- Hangul: 타샤
- RR: Tasya
- MR: T'asya

Tasha Low (born Natasha Low Yi Ling on 11 October 1993) is a Singaporean actress and singer. She was the leader of the South Korean girl group, Skarf from 2012 to 2014. Low is currently based in Singapore. She made her feature film debut in The Diam Diam Era in 2020.

== Early life ==
Born on 11 October 1993 into a family of ballroom dancers, Low's great-grandfather was Low Poh San, who introduced ballroom dancing to Singapore and would later become Singapore Professional Ballroom Champion in 1946 and from 1950 to 1953. Low's grandfather, Sunny Low, was also an accomplished dancer and was a household name in Singapore in the 70's and 80's. Her parents, Alvyn Low and Lucy Wang, were also accomplished ballroom dancers. They divorced in 2007. Low's brother was also trained in Thailand to be a professional ballroom dancer.

After graduating with a Singapore-Cambridge GCE Ordinary Level at Fuhua Secondary School, Low accompanied her friend to participate in the Singapore leg of the JYP and Alpha Asean Region Audition held in 2010 by Alpha Entertainment. Being one of the four Singaporeans selected, Low moved to South Korea the following year.

Low is fluent in English, Mandarin Chinese, and Korean.

== Career ==
=== 2012–2017: Debut with Skarf and solo activities in Korea ===
After undergoing two years of intensive training in South Korea, Low debuted with the Singaporean-South Korean girl group Skarf, in which she served as the leader, dancer, rapper and vocalist. She and another member, Ferlyn, were the two Singaporean members in Skarf until Ferlyn left the group in 2014. The group debuted with their first mini album, Oh! Dance and performed the song on KBS's Music Bank on 17 August 2012. On 14 August 2012, Skarf held their debut showcase in Seoul.

In 2012, Low was picked as an endorsement model for a smartphone line, Pantech Vega R3. In 2013, she was selected as a host for Arirang's music program, Pops in Seoul. In the same year, Low also appeared on MBC's Gangnam Feel Dance. In 2014, she joined MBC's Dancing 9 alongside Glam's Zinni but was disqualified for personal reasons. In 2015, Low appeared as the female lead in TimeZ's and Roy Kim's MV for "Awaken" and "The Great Dipper", respectively.

It was announced in 2015 that Low will be joining a new group following the disbandment of Skarf in 2014, with the group being sold to CJ E&M. In 2016, Low and other trainees under CJ E&M made an appearance on Chinese girl group survival reality programme Lady Bees.

In 2017, Low joined the girl group survival show Idol School to compete with 40 other contestants for an opportunity to debut in a 9-member girl group Fromis 9. Although she was recognised for her dance and leadership abilities, she was eliminated from the potential debut group when she ranked 23rd in Episode 10.

On 31 December 2017, her Instagram post stated that she will be starting her solo career, where she will be promoting future activities as Yu I Yeong.

=== 2018–present: Return to Singapore and venture into acting ===
In January 2018, Low stopped all her activities in Korea and returned to Singapore.

Low was cast and played her first lead role in the 2019 web series, Cheerific, which follows the story of a star rugby player who finds his calling as a cheerleader after getting kicked off the rugby team. She is also part of the television adaption of Goh Boon Teck's 1994 play, Titoudao, which premiered on 18 February 2020 on Mediacorp Channel 5. Titoudao was later dubbed in Chinese and broadcast on Mediacorp Channel 8 from 18 May 2020.

Low made her film debut in 2020's The Diam Diam Era, and its 2021 sequel The Diam Diam Era Two. She further played major roles in original Chinese drama series broadcast on Mediacorp Channel 8, such as Mind Jumper and Live Your Dreams in 2021.

On 9 April 2023, Low received her first Top 10 Most Popular Female Artistes award at the Star Awards.

On 30 January 2024, Low was officially announced as a lead cast member in the 2025 period drama Emerald Hill - The Little Nyonya Story, the sequel to Mediacorp's Channel 8 2008 drama series The Little Nyonya. She takes on a leading role alongside Ferlyn Wong, her former bandmate from the girl group Skarf, and Chantalle Ng. In this series, Low takes on the role of Zhang Xinniang, a young woman who was once a destitute street beggar but later finds herself adopted into a wealthy and influential family.

== Filmography ==
=== Film ===
| Year | Title | Role | Ref. |
|---|---|---|---|
| 2020 | The Diam Diam Era | Mei Ping | |
| 2021 | The Diam Diam Era Two | Mei Ping | |

=== Television series ===
| Year | Title | Role | Notes | Ref. |
|---|---|---|---|---|
| 2012 | It Takes Two | Herself | Cameo | |
| 2019 | Cheerific | Chloe | | |
| 2020 | Titoudao | Ah Dui | | |
| 2021 | Mind Jumper (触心罪探) | Jasmine Foo Liting | | |
| 2021 | Live Your Dreams (大大的梦想) | Li Sitong | | |
| 2021 | All that Jess | Jessica Tan | | |
| 2022 | Genie In A Cup (哇到宝) | She Xiaoqian | | |
| 2022 | Love At First Bite (遇见你，真香！) | Zann | | |
| 2023 | Silent Walls | Gu Zhenzhu | | |
| 2023 | Oppa, Saranghae! | Shine | | |
| 2024 | Hope Afloat (浴水重生) | Wang Xilin | | |
| 2024 | Coded Love | | | |
| 2025 | Emerald Hill - The Little Nyonya Story | Zhang Xin Niang | | |
| 2026 | Yes, Captain! | Charlize Teo | | |

=== Television shows ===
| Year | Title | Role | Notes | Ref. |
|---|---|---|---|---|
| 2012 | Oh! My Skarf | Herself | Reality show about Skarf's lives before debut | |
| 2013 | Gangnam Feel Dance | Contestant | | |
| 2013 | Pops in Seoul | Host | | |
| 2014 | Dancing 9 | Contestant | Tasha was disqualified for personal reasons | |
| 2017 | Idol School | Contestant | Girl group survival program | |

== Awards and nominations ==
| Organisation | Year | Category | Nominated work | Result | Ref. |
|---|---|---|---|---|---|
| Asian Television Awards | 2023 | Best Leading Female Performance- Digital | Oppa, Saranghae! | Nominated | |
| Star Awards | 2022 | Best Theme Song | Live Your Dreams | Nominated | |
| Star Awards | 2022 | Favourite Female Show Stealer | Live Your Dreams | Nominated | |
| Star Awards | 2022 | Favourite CP | Live Your Dreams | Nominated (Note: Shared with Richie Koh) | |
| Star Awards | 2023 | Favourite Female Show Stealer | Genie In A Cup | Nominated | |
| Star Awards | 2023 | Favourite CP | Genie In A Cup | Nominated (Note: Shared with Xu Bin) | |
| Star Awards | 2023 | Top 10 Most Popular Female Artistes | —N/a | Won | |
| Star Awards | 2024 | Top 10 Most Popular Female Artistes | —N/a | Won | |
| Star Awards | 2025 | Best Supporting Actress | Coded Love | Nominated | |
| Star Awards | 2025 | BYD Favourite Female Character Award | Hope Afloat | Nominated | |
| Star Awards | 2025 | Top 10 Most Popular Female Artistes | —N/a | Won | |
| Star Awards | 2026 | Best Actress | Emerald Hill - The Little Nyonya Story | Nominated | |
| Star Awards | 2026 | Top 10 Most Popular Female Artistes | —N/a | Won | |
| Star Awards | 2026 | Favourite CP | Emerald Hill - The Little Nyonya Story | Won (Note: Shared with Zhang Zetong) | |
| Star Awards | 2026 | Favourite CP | Emerald Hill - The Little Nyonya Story | Nominated (Note: Shared with Tyler Ten) | |
| Star Awards | 2026 | Most Emotional Performance | Emerald Hill - The Little Nyonya Story | Nominated | |
| Star Awards | 2026 | Bioskin Most Charismatic Artiste Award | Emerald Hill - The Little Nyonya Story | Nominated | |
| Star Awards | 2026 | BYD Favourite Female Character Award | Emerald Hill - The Little Nyonya Story | Won | |
