= We Are Singaporeans =

- Presented by: Hossan Leong (Seasons 1-3, 5); Najip Ali (Season 4)
- Narrated by: Will Xavier (Seasons 1-3); Justin Ang (Seasons 4-)
- Country of origin: Singapore
- Original language: English
- No. of episodes: 73

Production
- Executive producer: Julie Sim-Chew
- Producer: Teo Kian Nguan
- Production location: Mediacorp TV Studio
- Running time: 60 minutes (including commercials)
- Production company: Mediacorp

Original release
- Network: Mediacorp Channel 5
- Release: 6 April 2011 – present

We Are Singaporeans is a game show that aired on Singaporean English language channel Mediacorp Channel 5 about everything and anything Singapore from history to culture to trivia. Hosted by Hossan Leong, contestants will get the chance to walk away with up to $20,000 every week. The show, which will run for 15 weeks, will feature guest appearances by local celebrities and icons who will ask contestants questions relating to a particular topic.

The game show title was derived from a segment of the series The Noose, which became a recurring joke. The Noose later parodied the idea through a satirical sketch in which The Noose company sues Mediacorp for "stealing" the idea from them and even hires "Sudah Anandas" (parody for Subhas Anandan) to fight their case in court.

A Malay version called "Kita Orang Singapura" with similar rules hosted by Najip Ali (who later hosted the English version on Season 4) debuted on 6 Jan 2014 and will end on 31 March 2014. There is also a Tamil version known as "Savaal Singapore". A fifth season is announced on 13 September 2020 with casting for auditions open until 16 October. The fifth season will premiere on 4 January 2021, with Leong returning to host the program. The season finale aired on 12 April 2021.

At the end of season 5, a total of 73 episodes have aired on Channel 5.

== Format ==
=== Seasons 1-2 (2011-12) ===
==== Round 1 ====
Each of the three contestants, starting from the leftmost podium, will get to choose one of the nine celebrity icons to ask them a question, after which all three contestants have 15 seconds to key in their answer using a keypad onto their screen. A correct answer awards $50 to the contestant ($100 for season 2). Before a question is asked, contestants can use their Hero or Zero card at any question but must use the card within the round; a correct answer doubles their current winnings, but an incorrect answer expunges it. All winnings are guaranteed, and the highest scoring contestant goes to round 2. If there is a tie, a tie-breaker question is played with the same rules given. No money is awarded for the tiebreaker question, and the contestant that answers it correctly in the fastest time moves on to Round 2.

==== Round 2 ====
Question No.	Correct Answer Value
1	$250
2	$500
3	$1,000
4	$2,000
5	$3,500
6	$5,000
7	$6,500
8	$8,000
9	$10,000/$20,000

In this round, contestant choose the celebrity icons in any order to ask the questions with correct answers increasing the money won in the Money Tree (Money Plant in Season 1); all the levels are guaranteed and thus no risks are involved on answering a question. The contestant is given two lifelines of "Give Chance 4" and "Give Chance 2", which presents 4 and 2 possible answers; each card can only be used once in the round and may use both cards if they so choose within the same question. The round ends once the final question of $10,000 is answered, or the contestant answered incorrectly at any point.

In season 2, if the contestant reaches the last question, the contestant is given the opportunity to use the "Hero or Zero" card; by using the card, the contestant risks the $8,000 won in the round to double the grand prize to $20,000.

Including the grand prize, the maximum potential winnings is $10,900 in season 1, and $21,800 in season 2, by answering every questions in both rounds correctly, and using the "Hero or Zero" card on the final question for both rounds.

=== Season 3 (2014) ===
==== Round 1 ====
With the number of celebrities per episode being reduced to 6, this round now had 7 questions instead of 9, with the last question being a video-based question starring the host Hossan Leong. Every question was worth $200 this season, and the Hero or Zero card gameplay element was also present. This made for a maximum possible winnings of $2,800. The contestant with the highest score went on to the next round.

==== Round 2 ====
Question No.	Correct Answer Value
1	$250
2	$500
3	$1,000
4	$2,000
5	$4,000
6	$8,000
7	$20,000

Similar to the Round 2 played in the first two seasons, contestant answer up to seven questions with money increasing and guaranteed for every succeeding correct answers in a high-rise flat, however, the order is fixed and determined by the host itself.

On the final level, a contestant is offered a $20,000 bonus question (entitled Hero or Zero question) to the contestant; the contestant that makes it to this level must decide whether or not to either end the game with the winnings won or risk it to attempt the final question; a correct answer increased their winnings total to $20,000, while a miss reduced it to $4,000.

This season also introduced the idea of the "Honour Roll", where the three contestants with the highest prize only were invited back for the final episode. During the finale, all the money levels in the round were doubled and guaranteed, meaning there was also no risk involved on the final question; this means the grand prize is doubled to $40,000.

=== Season 4: Global Edition (2017) ===
Denominations
Kena Fine (Round 1)	Pickup Board (Round 3)
$1	$300
$10	$500
$20	$800
$50	$1,000
$80	$1,500
$100	$2,000

The number of contestants were reduced to two while the number of celebrities remained at six, similar to Season 3. Najip Ali (who also hosted the Malay edition Kita Orang Singapura) replaced Leong as the host, and the questions are now focused on global trends and current affairs, hence the title "Global Edition".

==== Round 1: The Numbers Game ====
Six questions that focused on the statistics and surveys asked by Singaporeans are asked, which are narrated by the celebrity icon. The contestant starting from the left podium, will get to choose one of the six celebrity icons to ask them a survey-related multiple-choice question of three answers. Every correct answer is worth $200. In replacement with the Hero or Zero card, which was removed for the entire season, an incorrect answer will result in a 'Kena Fine', which penalizes the contestant's winnings from ranging from $1 and $100, with a penalty of up to $261 (see denominations table). The next contestant may attempt to answer from the remaining two options; a correct answer will earn $100, but an incorrect answer will also deduct by the same denomination. This made for a maximum possible winnings of $900, and their winnings cannot go below $0 or end with a negative score.

==== Round 2: Don't Bluff! ====
Two video-based questions (usually narrated by a local celebrity) will be played, with three celebrity icons giving their answers. The contestant with the higher score from Round 1 gets to choose a category given by Ali, and have to determine if which celebrity is 'telling the truth'. A correct answer is worth $300; if incorrect, the opponent will try to answer for $150. No penalty is given for an incorrect answer for this round. A maximum possible winnings of $450 could be won in this round.

==== Round 3: Double Trouble ====
Six questions were provided in this round, each with two different options. A contestant will attempt to buzz-in and answer the question in a ten-second timer. Afterwards, contestants who ring in will get to choose a picture from the 'pickup board' to reveal the sum of money played for the question. A correct answer wins the sum shown on the board, while an incorrect answer loses $200. The money is then taken out of play after the question regardless of the result. The maximum possible winnings for this round is $6,100 (see denominations table above). All winnings are guaranteed, and the highest scoring contestant after the first three rounds goes to the bonus round.

==== Bonus round ====
Unlike the previous seasons where contestant would answer a series of questions in order to win the grand prize, the contestant are given only one question (dictated by Najip Ali) and four answers and are asked to put those four answers into a particular order (similar to the "Fastest Finger" round from Who Wants to Be a Millionaire?) for a grand prize of $10,000. Because of the modified bonus round, the lifelines (namely "Give Chance 2" and "Give Chance 4") were absent as well.

Including the grand prize, a contestant can win up to $17,450 over the course of the entire game, by answering every question correctly on every given opportunity, buzzing first and answer correctly on all six questions in Round 3, and answering the bonus round question correctly.

=== Season 5 (2021) ===
Season 5 follows the same game format similar to the fourth season. Couple of season changes such as Hossan Leong returning to host after a season hiatus, as well as other changes:

- The episodes are filmed without studio audience due to the ongoing COVID-19 pandemic.
- In Round 1 (The Numbers Game), two out of the six celebrities each hold a "Top up" card, awarding an additional bonus of either $50 or $100 (these values are not halved for any incorrect answers). The penalties for "Kena Fine" have the same denominations and contestants answered four questions in total, down from six (the maximum total is lowered to $600 as well; $750 if both "Top up" cards were found).
- Round 3 was renamed to "Triple Trouble", and each question now have three answers. If the contestant buzzes in the contestant have a choice to choose one of the HDB flats (renamed from pickup board) for the value played for the question; if incorrect, the other contestant can either choose to answer for half the amount, or pass the question without a penalty (for example, if the chosen amount is $500, a second correct answer is worth $250). The denominations in the pickup board and the penalty for an incorrect answer remained the same; however, an incorrect answer for the second answer incurs half of the penalty ($100).

Theoretically, the maximum potential winnings for a contestant is $17,300, providing if the contestant correctly answers all questions, which includes the $10,000 grand prize and finding both "Top up" cards in round 1.

== Celebrity guests ==
Each episode featured six (nine in seasons 1 and 2) local celebrity personalities such as singers, characters from local television shows and movies or Mediacorp artistes and a "Singaporean icon" (e.g. parking attendant, taxi driver, coolie, businessman, etc.).
