= Making Miracles =

Making Miracles (Chinese: 奇迹) is a Singaporean Chinese drama which is telecast on Singapore's free-to-air channel, MediaCorp TV Channel 8. It made its debut on 6 March 2007. The show consists of a total of 20 episodes.

The whole theme of this drama is about the lives that doctors and nurses face currently.

This drama serial is said to be a drama with high expectations, as it the cast includes one of Singapore's prettiest actress Fann Wong having a disfigured face in this show, and Hong Kong veteran actor David Chiang would also be acting in this show. Other than the cast, the show shows audience many scenes of modernized medical equipment in hospitals. However, the viewership figures proved to be disappointing when the drama was aired.

== Synopsis ==
Shuyan (Fann Wong) is an optimistic and passionate pediatrician who met with a traffic accident and is disfigured in the process. The accident is caused by plastic surgeon Jieren's (Terence Cao) jealous ex-girlfriend Zhilin (Lynn Poh), he then puts his heart and soul in treating Shuyan but was unsuccessful.

Dejected, Shuyan contemplates giving up but was consoled patiently by Jieren, who persuaded her to continue with the treatment. At the same time, Shuyan's boyfriend Zhengbang (Darren Lim), who works in the same hospital was injured in a struggle and lost his memory of Shuyan and his love for her. She now faces the adversity of her own disfigured self and a seemingly nonchalant Zhengbang, at the same time struggles with her feelings for the affectionate Jieren.

A compelling modern drama set in a hospital with several heartwarming subplots to tug the heartstrings.

== Cast ==
=== Main cast ===
- Fann Wong as Liu Shuyan
- David Chiang as Dr. Chen Guanlin
- Terence Cao as Wen Jieren
- Darren Lim as Gao Zhengbang
- Joanne Peh as Li Xiaoman
- Constance Song as Zhou Xiwen

=== Supporting cast ===
- Zheng Geping as Zheng Yifan
- Vivian Lai as Xu Xiuyuan
- Carole Lin as Yang Zhihua
- Shaun Chen as Kelvin
- Ezann Lee as Du Xiaoyuan
- Lynn Poh as Zhi Lin
- Wang Yuqing as Dr Wang
