= David Bala =

Singaporean comedian and actor

- Born: 1947; Colony of Singapore
- Died: 29 August 2014 (aged 67); Singapore
- Resting place: Mandai Crematorium and Columbarium
- Occupations: Actor, comedian
- Years active: 1979–2013
- Label: Mediacorp (1979 - 2013)
- Children: 4

David Bala was a Singaporean security guard, former comedian and actor. He was best known for his roles in Tetangga, Just Follow Law, Ah Long Pte Ltd, Where Got Ghost? and The Ghosts Must Be Crazy and Filial Party.

== Career ==
Bala was first introduced to acting by a friend and started his career as a stage actor in 1976 and made his broadcast debut in 1979 on Radio Television Singapore's "Kaatchiyum Kaanamum", a radio drama production. In 1980, he made his television debut where he was cast as the lead actor in a comedy drama series, "Ippadiyum Oru Kudumbam".

Due to the success of the series, Bala was known by many as "Comedy King" and in 2007, he was cast in a Jack Neo film known as Just Follow Law. In the same year he was also given a lead role on Mediacorp Suria's Tetangga and in 2008, he was cast in another Jack Neo film known as Ah Long Pte Ltd.

In 2011, Bala was cast in The Ghosts Must Be Crazy. This is arguably one of Bala's best-known roles, as a catchphrase of his character in the film became a meme.

== Personal life ==
Other than acting, Bala was working as a security officer at Republic Polytechnic since January 2014.

=== Death ===
Bala died on August 29, 2014, due to heart disease and is survived by his wife and 4 children. His remains were placed in the niche at Mandai Columbarium & Crematorium.

== Filmography ==
=== Movies ===
Year	Title	Role	Notes	Ref
2007	Just Follow Law	Muthu		
2008	Ah Long Pte Ltd	Muthu		
2009	Where Got Ghost?	MWO Muthu	Regimental Sergeant Major	
2011	The Ghosts Must Be Crazy	1WO Muthu	Regimental Sergeant Major	
2014	Filial Party	Indian Neighbour		Final Role

=== TV series ===
Year	Title	Role	Network	Notes
1979	Ippadiyum Oru Kudumbam	-	RTS Channel 8 (Tamil section) (now Mediacorp Vasantham)	
2007	Tetangga	Govind	Mediacorp Suria	
2007	World Of Laughs 搞笑至尊	Muthu	Mediacorp Channel 8	

== Awards ==
Year	Award	Category	Result
1980	Singapore Indian Artistes’ Association	Kalaichemmal (Arts Medallion) Award	Won
2009	Pradhana Vizha Hall of Fame	Lifetime Achievement Award	Won
