= Ryan Lian =

Singaporean actor (born 1985)

- Born: 4 September 1985 (age 41); Singapore
- Occupations: Actor; singer
- Years active: 2010–present

Chinese name
- Traditional Chinese: 廖永誼
- Simplified Chinese: 廖永谊
- Hanyu Pinyin: Liào Yǒngyì

Ryan Lian Yong Yi (born 4 September 1985) is a Singaporean actor, singer and host.

== Early life ==
Lian was raised by his grandmother after his parents divorced when he was a child.

== Career ==
Lian is managed by J Team productions under mm2 Entertainment.

Lian had been taking on minor roles in Mediacorp dramas for more than 15 years before he made his film debut in director Jack Neo's movie Long Long Time Ago and Long Long Time Ago 2 as Ah Long and this was the first time he was one of the main leads.

In a Singaporean crime show titled In Cold Blood, Lian portrayed "Koh", who was based on Lee Chez Kee, a Malaysian who killed an NUS associate professor during a robbery in 1993 before spending 13 years as a fugitive. Lee committed the crime with two other men, who were both arrested in 1998. Lee was arrested and convicted of the murder in 2006, and was executed by the time the episode aired in 2012.

In 2017, Lian was featured in Take 2 and Ah Boys to Men 4, where he was the first main lead in the former film and reprises his role as Ah Long in the latter film.

== Personal life ==
In an interview with Lianhe Zaobao in 2022, Lian revealed he was struggling with his mental health.

On 18 September 2024, it was reported that Lian was arrested on 15 September after an alleged prying of a digital lock of an HDB flat at Telok Blangah. In an interview in October 2025, Lian said he had spent five days at the Institute of Mental Health.

In a June 2025 interview, Lian said he had roamed the streets earlier in the year, from February to April, rough sleeping in public and occasionally returning home, stopping when his grandmother died in April. In November, Lian was attacked by a man with a knife. He suffered facial injuries and his friend who was with him was also injured.

== Filmography ==
=== Film ===
Year	Title	Role	Notes	Ref.
2014	Fragrant Rice			
2016	Long Long Time Ago	Ah Long		
2016	Long Long Time Ago 2	Ah Long		
2016	4Love		Short film	
2017	Take 2	Ah Hu		
2017	Ah Boys to Men 4	Corporal Ah Long		
2021	The Diam Diam Era Two	Ah Long		
2024	Money No Enough 3			
2024	King of Hawkers			

=== Television series ===
Year	Title	Role	Notes	Ref.
2017	The Lead	Director		
2018	Die Die Also Must Serve (战备好兄弟)	Huang Hongxiao		
2018	Babies On Board	Peng Weide		
2019	Hello From The Other Side (阴错阳差)	Xiaohei		
2019	My One In A Million (我的万里挑一)	Alex		
2023	Till the End	Chen Xiaolong		

== Discography ==
=== Singles ===
Year	Title	Album	Notes
2017	遇见贵人	Non-album single	Theme song for Take 2
2017	你比从前快乐	Non-album single	
