= Mei Xin =

Singaporean actress and host (born 1986)

- Born: Chen Mei Xin; 26 November 1986 (age 39); Singapore
- Other name: Macy Chen
- Occupations: Actress; singer; host
- Years active: 2006–present
- Musical career
- Genre: Mandopop
- Instrument: Vocals

Stage name
- Chinese: 美心
- Hanyu Pinyin: Měi Xīn

Birth name
- Traditional Chinese: 陳美心
- Simplified Chinese: 陈美心
- Hanyu Pinyin: Chén Měixīn

Mei Xin (born Chen Mei Xin on 26 November 1986) is a Singaporean actress, singer and host.

== Career ==
In 2006, Chen participated in a beauty pageant and emerged as the champion. Shortly after, she signed to Popstar Media, a local agency, and made appearances in commercials and magazines and played small roles in television series. In 2007, she released her debut single "A Moment" (瞬间) and played a supporting role in the Mediacorp drama series Dear, Dear Son-In-Law in the same year.

Chen made her career breakthrough in 2009 where she starred as the female lead in the Chinese series Guangdong Gentleman, produced and directed by Zhao Benshan, who is one of China's most preeminent actor and director. Zhao had spotted Chen in a fundraising event hosted by CCTV in 2008 and decided to cast Chen in his production. In February 2010, Chen became Zhao's 49th and only foreign protégé. The same year, Chen had a prominent role in the drama series The Illusionist and thereafter began her long-running collaboration with Wawa Pictures, where she appeared in their numerous productions, including Crescendo (2015), The Queen (2016), After The Stars (2019), CTRL (2021), Genie in a Cup (2022) and Oppa, Saranghae! (2023).

Chen has also starred in Jack Neo's film The Diam Diam Era (2020) and its sequel The Diam Diam Era Two (2021). She was once managed by Neo's J Team Productions.

== Filmography ==
=== Television series ===
| Year | Title | Role | Notes | Ref. |
|---|---|---|---|---|
| 2007 | Dear, Dear Son-In-Law | Jiang Yi Lin | | |
| 2009 | Guangdong Gentleman | | | |
| 2010 | The Illusionist | Ming Zhang | | |
| 2014 | A War Veteran | | | |
| 2014 | Blessings | Ou Yangxuan | | |
| 2015 | Crescendo | Liang Meiqi | | |
| 2015 | Let It Go | | | |
| 2016 | Fire Up | Story | | |
| 2016 | The Queen | Zhou Yutong | Cameo | |
| 2016 | C.L.I.F. 4 | Tsai Ye Chi | | |
| 2017 | Home Truly | Hong Jingeun | | |
| 2017 | Eat Already? 3 | | Cameo | |
| 2017 | When Duty Calls | Yao Yixin | | |
| 2017 | My Friends from Afar | Liang Simin | | |
| 2018 | Babies On Board | Zheng Meifang | | |
| 2018 | Fifty & Fabulous | Young Mary | | |
| 2018 | Blessings 2 | Ou Yangxuan | | |
| 2019 | My One in a Million | Jiang Zhirong | | |
| 2019 | After The Stars | Wen Wen | Cameo | |
| 2020 | Terror Within | Fang Mingjie | | |
| 2021 | CTRL | Joanna | | |
| 2021 | Mind Jumper | Xu Leiying | | |
| 2021 | My Mini-me and Me | Ye Xinjing | | |
| 2022 | Genie in a Cup | Catherine | | |
| 2023 | Silent Walls | Jin Kai Ting | | |
| 2023 | Oppa, Saranghae! | Song Jieling | | |
| 2024 | Born to Shine | | | |

=== Film ===
| Year | Title | Role | Notes | Ref. |
|---|---|---|---|---|
| 2010 | Being Human | Mrs Li | | |
| 2017 | Single City | Qiqi | Telemovie | |
| 2018 | Wake Up! | | Short film | |
| 2019 | The Droner | Xiao Han | TV Movie | |
| 2020 | The Diam Diam Era | Su Ting | | |
| 2021 | The Diam Diam Era Two | Su Ting | | |

=== Variety show host ===
| Year | Title | Notes | Ref. |
|---|---|---|---|
| 2006 | On The Beat | Season 2 | |

== Discography ==
=== Studio albums ===
| Year | Album title | Remark(s) |
|---|---|---|
| 2010 | Ai Zhe Ni (爱着你) | 10 songs |

=== Singles ===
| Year | Song title | Remark(s) |
|---|---|---|
| 2007 | "A Moment" (瞬间) | |
| 2007 | "Loving You" (因为爱着你) | |

== Awards and nominations ==
| Organisation | Year | Category | Nominated work | Result | Ref. |
|---|---|---|---|---|---|
| Asian Television Awards | 2021 | Best Actress in a Supporting Role | Mind Jumper | Nominated | |
| New York Festivals TV & Film Awards | 2022 | Best Performance by an Actress | My Mini-me and Me | Nominated | |
| Star Awards | 2018 | Best Supporting Actress | When Duty Calls | Nominated | |
| Star Awards | 2021 | Top 10 Most Popular Female Artistes | —N/a | Nominated | |
| Star Awards | 2024 | Top 10 Most Popular Female Artistes | —N/a | Nominated | |
| Star Awards | 2025 | Best Supporting Actress | Born to Shine | Nominated | |
| Star Awards | 2025 | Top 10 Most Popular Female Artistes | —N/a | Nominated | |
