= Sunny Low =

Singaporean choreographer (c. 1940–2022)

Sunny Low 刘山尼
- Born: c. 1940; Singapore
- Died: 8 May 2022 (aged 82); Singapore
- Education: Outram Secondary School
- Occupations: Ballroom dancer and Choreographer
- Spouse: Aleena Tan (m. 1989)
- Children: Alvyn Low; Melvyn Low; Kelvyn Low; Jovyn Low
- Parents: Low Poh San (father); Jenny Quek (mother)
- Relatives: Tasha Low (granddaughter)

Sunny Low (Chinese: 刘山尼; pinyin: Liú Shānní; c. 1940 – 8 May 2022) was a Singaporean ballroom dancer and choreographer. The son of a local ballroom dancing pioneer, he began dancing as a teenager and later established his own dance studio.

== Early life ==
Sunny Low was born to Low Poh San, who founded the Poh San Dance Studio in 1937 and is credited with introducing ballroom dancing to Singapore, and his wife Jenny (née Quek). Sunny had six siblings and was the eldest son in the family. He attended Outram Secondary School and began dancing at the age of 14.

== Career ==
Low formally assumed leadership of his father's dance studio in 1955. In September 1957, together with his sister, Betty, Low won the first calypso dance contest in Singapore. A year later, Low and his sister were dubbed the "King and Queen of Cha-Cha-Cha and Rock 'n' Roll" by the International Society of Teachers of Dancing.

In 1967, Low starred in a televised talent show titled Pestarama that was produced by Tony Yeow and broadcast weekly on TV Singapura. The same year, Low briefly worked as a dance choreographer for the Hong Kong television broadcasting company TVB.

In 1969, Low established the Sunny Low Dancers with Aleena Tan as the lead dancer. Low and Tan would then establish the Sunny Low Dance Studio in 1986. Both of them were also founding members of the Singapore Ballroom Dance Teachers Association. The Singapore International Ballroom Dancing Championships, which Low and Tan first organised in 1987, was held annually for 26 years.

== Personal life and death ==
Low married Aleena Tan (born c. 1955) in 1989. They had four sons: Alvyn, Melvyn, Kelvyn, and Jovyn. Low's father died of a heart attack on 31 December 2003, aged 91. Low himself died of a brain hemorrhage on 8 May 2022, aged 82. He was survived by his wife, three of his four children, seven grandchildren, including singer and actress Tasha Low, and seven great-grandchildren.
