= Ezann Lee =

Singaporean actress (born 1982)

- Born: 5 February 1982 (age 43); Singapore
- Other names: Li Zhiyi
- Education: Saint Anthony's Canossian Secondary School; Serangoon Junior College; University of Queensland
- Alma mater: Singapore Institute of Management
- Occupations: Actress; host
- Years active: 2004–present
- Relatives: Ericia Lee (sister)

Chinese name
- Traditional Chinese: 李之儀
- Simplified Chinese: 李之仪
- Hanyu Pinyin: Lǐ Zhīyí

Ezann Lee (born 5 February 1982) is a Singaporean actress and television host, who is best known for her roles in the television series Destiny (2005) and Making Miracles (2007). She has also appeared in the film Be with Me (2005), directed by Eric Khoo.

== Life and career ==
Lee has an older sister, Ericia, who is also a television host and actress, and a younger sister, Eilania.

Lee was educated at Saint Anthony's Canossian Secondary School and Serangoon Junior College. A former psychology student at the University of Queensland, she deferred her studies in 2003 to make her debut in the entertainment industry after being spotted by Kym Ng during a Channel U variety show.

In June 2004, Lee signed a two-year contract with SPH MediaWorks, joining her older sister Ericia at the TV station. In September 2004, SPH MediaWorks announced that it would be merged with Mediacorp and in December 2004, it was reported that Lee was one of the 18 artistes who accepted an offer to join Mediacorp.

In 2012, she graduated with a Bachelor of Business Management from Singapore Institute of Management.

== Filmography ==
Lee has appeared in the following programmes and films:

=== Television series ===
- Zero (2004)
- Perfect Women (2004)
- 7th Month (2004; anthology series)
- Destiny (2005)
- Love at 0°C (2006)
- Measure of Man (2006)
- ABC DJ (2006)
- Life Story (2006)
- Making Miracles (2007)
- Fighting Spiders (2009)
- Fighting Spiders (2010; season 2)
- Premonition (2016)

=== Film ===
- Be with Me (2005)
- Love Under the Sign of the Dragon (2008; telemovie)
- Echoing Love (2011)
- Mr. Unbelievable (2015)
- Single City (2017; telemovie)

=== Show hosting ===
- Mission Impossible (2004)
- Aha Kids (2005; children programme)
- Happy Sunday Kids (2005; children programme)
- Wonder Baby (2007)
- Chinese New Year 101 (2007)
- My Yummy Lunchbox (2007)

== Awards and nominations ==
Year	Award	Category	Nominated work	Result	Ref
2005	Star Awards 2005	Most Popular Newcomer	—	Nominated	
2007	Star Awards 2007	Best Supporting Actress	Making Miracles	Nominated	
