= Hossan Leong =

- 梁荣耀
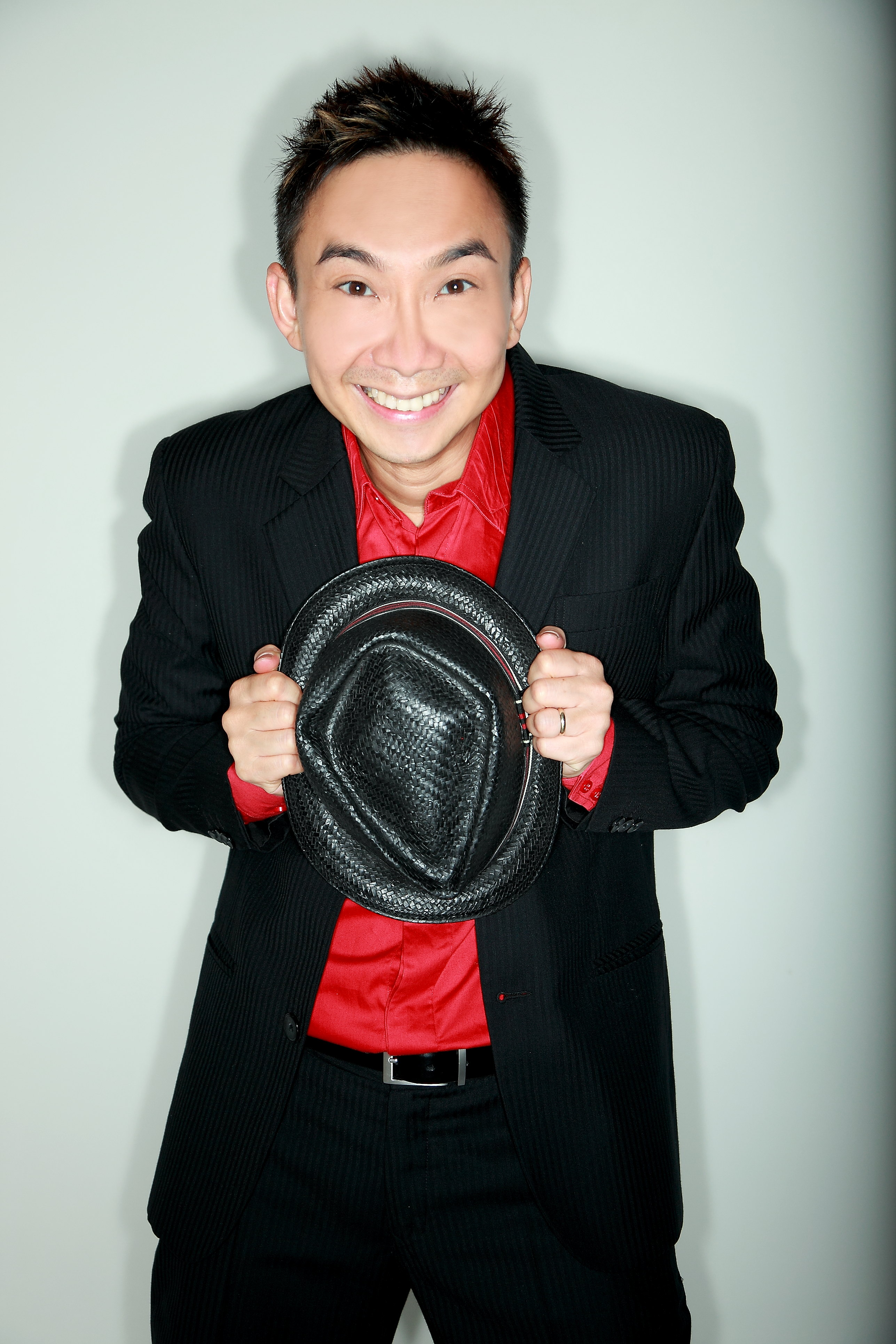
- Born: 10 July 1969 (age 57); Singapore
- Education: Anglo-Chinese School; French-Singapore Institute
- Occupations: Actor, comedian, host, radio DJ
- Years active: 1993–present
- Agent: Double Confirm Productions (founder)

Chinese name
- Traditional Chinese: 梁榮耀
- Simplified Chinese: 梁荣耀
Transcriptions
Standard Mandarin
- Hanyu Pinyin: Liáng Róngyào
- Musical career

Hossan Leong (simplified Chinese: 梁荣耀; traditional Chinese: 梁榮耀; pinyin: Liáng Róngyào; born 10 July 1969) is a Singaporean stage and screen actor, television host, radio deejay and comedian.

== Personal life ==
He was born 10 July 1969 in Singapore, Leong was educated at Anglo-Chinese School and Anglo-Chinese Junior College and studied electronics at the French Singapore Institute, which was since transferred in February 1993 and currently part of Nanyang Polytechnic. He is of Cantonese descent and speaks Cantonese.

== Career ==
Leong started his showbiz career as a television actor and starred in several TCS English and Chinese language dramas during the 1990s before diversifying into theatre and comedy.

Having learned French while studying at the French-Singapore Institute, he is fluent in the language and worked with the Alliance française for some time. In 2010 he was conferred the Chevalier de l'Ordre des Arts et des Lettres by the French Ministry of Culture.

Besides acting, Leong was also a radio deejay with Gold 90.5FM. He came under media spotlight after he was reportedly censured for announcing the disruption to the Circle Line train services on the morning of 14 December 2011 as SMRT had not issued an official statement. As host of the weekday breakfast show, Leong had a practice of reading out user comments on Twitter account regarding public transport and traffic conditions. The station's response triggered massive criticism from many netizens and listeners already angered by SMRT's delay in announcing the disruption, which took place during the early morning "rush hour" and affected thousands. Leong later released an apology on his Twitter account and asked readers to "move on" from the incident.

== Filmography ==
=== Film ===
| Year | Title | Role | Ref. |
|---|---|---|---|
| 2017 | The Fortune Handbook | Fortune God intern | |
| 2007 | Just Follow Law | Land Redevelopment Authority (LRA) Representative | |
| 2005 | One Last Dance | Treesan | |
| 2002 | I Not Stupid | Ben | |
| 2001 | One Leg Kicking | Eugene | |

=== Television ===
| Year | Title | Role | Notes | Ref. |
|---|---|---|---|---|
| 2017 | Eat Already? 3 | Mo Dok | | |
| 2016-2017 | Eat Already? 2 | Mo Mun | | |
| 2009 | Perfect Cut II 一切完美2 | | | |
| 2006 | ABC DJ | | Executive producer | |
| 2005 | A New Life 有福 | Ah Gen | | |
| 1996 | Can I Help You? | Jimmy Tok | | |

=== Theatre ===
| Year | Title | Role |
|---|---|---|
| 2019 | Hossan-ah! 50 | |
| 2017 | Army Daze 2 | Malcolm Png |
| 2012 | The Hossan Leong Show 2012 - Flying Solo | |
| 2011 | The Hossan Leong Show 2011 (Episode 3) | |
| 2010 | The Hossan Leong Show 2010 (Episode 2) | |
| 2009 | The Hossan Leong Show | |
| 2002 | Forbidden City: Portrait of An Empress | Gatekeeper 1 |
| 1997 | Chang & Eng | Royal Messenger/Doctor |

=== Shows hosted ===
- We Are Singaporeans (2011 - present)
- The Rocky Horror Show (2012) (Singapore tour)
- National Day Parade 2014
