= Nanny Daddy =

- 奶爸百分百
- Starring: Adrian Pang; Yvonne Lim; Yao Wenlong; Kanny Theng; Aileen Tan; Brandon Wong; Yan Bingliang
- Original language: Chinese
- No. of episodes: 20

Production
- Running time: approx. 45 minutes

Original release
- Network: Mediacorp Channel 8
- Release: 2 September – 29 September 2008

Nanny Daddy (奶爸百分百) is a Singaporean drama that aired on Mediacorp Channel 8. It debuted on 2 September 2008 and consists of 20 episodes.

== Cast ==
- Adrian Pang as Alan Liu Zhuo Lun
- Yvonne Lim as Lin Ai Hua
- Yao Wenlong as He Ming Feng
- Aileen Tan as Sophia Feng
- Kanny Theng as June
- Brandon Wong
- Yan Bingliang
- Rayson Ng as Rayson Ng

== Accolades ==
Organisation	Year	Category	Recipient(s)	Result	Ref.
Star Awards	2009	Top 10 Highest Viewership Local Dramas in 2008 Award 十大最高收视率	—N/a	Won Highly Commended	
Star Awards	2009	Best Actor	Adrian Pang	Nominated	
