= Suhaimi Yusof =

Singaporean actor

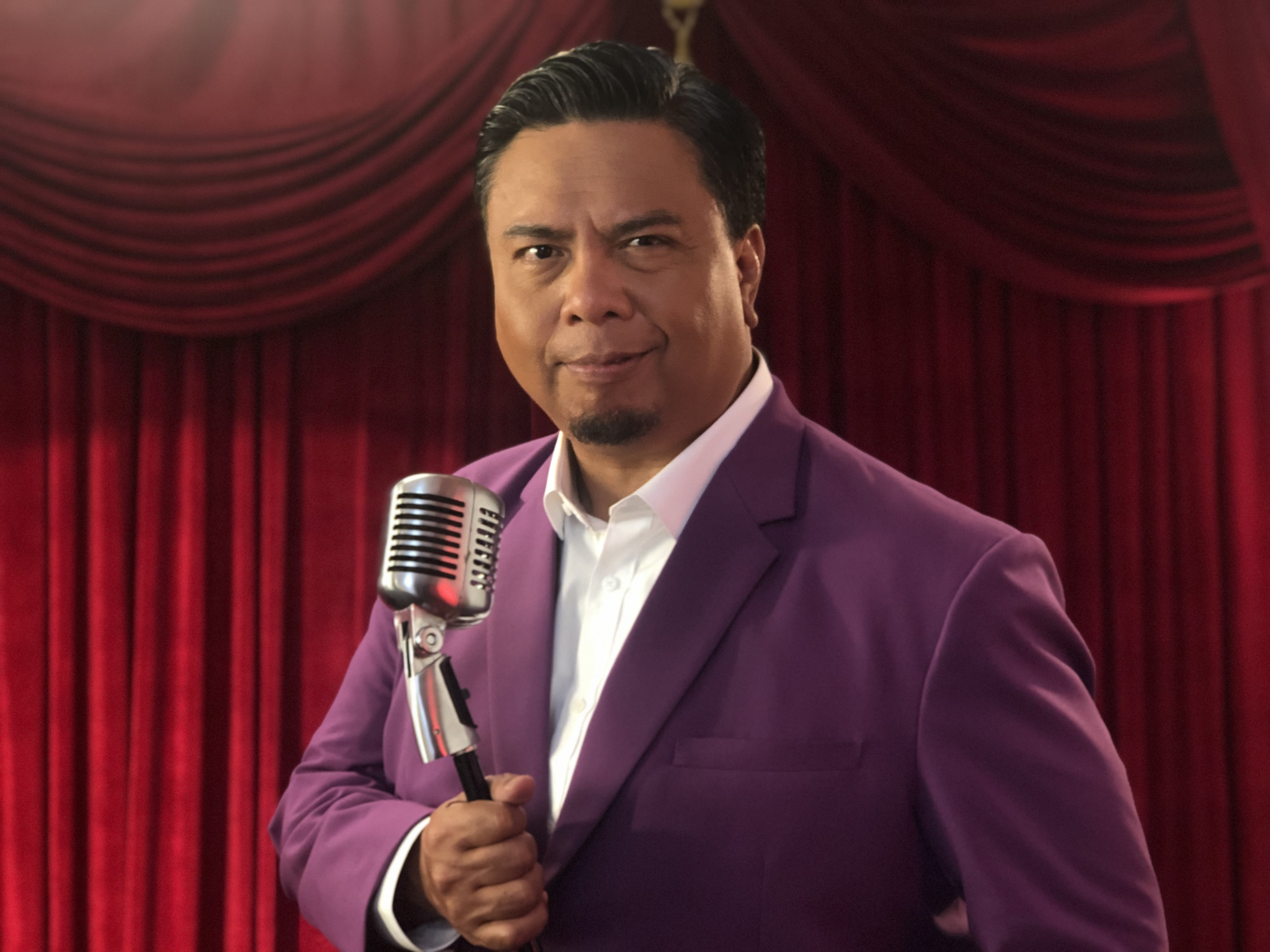
- Suhaimi in 2019
- Born: 4 September 1969 (age 57); Jalan Kampung Tengah, Punggol, Singapore
- Known for: Sulaiman Yusof from Living with Lydia, Sgt Dollah Abu Bakar from Police & Thief, Reporter Jojo Joget from The Noose
- Notable work: Actor, comedian, entertainer, radio DJ
- Spouse: Siti Yuhana
- Awards: 2001 - 2008 Mediacorp Suria's Best Host Award. 2001 - 2009 Mediacorp Suria's Most Popular Personality Award. 2011 ATV Best Comedy Performance award by an Actor 2011 Astro Maharajalawak Mega Finalist 2012 Astro Superspontan Finalist
- Website: Suhaimiyusof_Official (Instagram)

Suhaimi bin Yusof (born 4 September 1969) is a Singaporean actor, comedian, entertainer and radio DJ, known for playing exaggerated Malay stereotype characters and for his spontaneity.

== Early life and education ==
Suhaimi was born on 4 September 1969, in Jalan Kampung Tengah, Punggol, Singapore, the seventh of nine children. Suhaimi's mother, Fatimah Yusof (née Adenan, born 1940), was a homemaker and his father, Yusof Bujang, was a technician. The family moved to Hougang when Suhaimi was sixteen.

Suhaimi spent four years at Montfort Secondary School. Shy by nature, Suhaimi soon realised his potential as an actor during secondary school, when his teacher selected him to perform a skit for a Teachers' Day concert. Initially panicking, he finally came up with a character named "Montfort Jackson," a spoof of American recording artist Michael Jackson and received many laughs from his peers during his performance.

After obtaining his 'O' levels, he attended Tampines Junior College and graduated with a Bachelor of Arts Degree in Broadcast Media Production with First Class Honours from Teesside University, England.

== Career ==
=== Media career ===
At an inter-school Malay debate competition, Suhaimi greatly impressed Zakiah Halim, a Malay radio veteran, with his performance. Following that, Halim offered Suhaimi a part-time job as a host on the radio programme Majalah Remaja, which was aimed at teens. After his studies and the completion of his compulsory national service, Suhaimi joined the Singapore Broadcasting Corporation (now Mediacorp) as a full-time radio presenter, and soon he was hosting the morning radio show.

SBC's television department later offered him his first onscreen gig, co-hosting Potret Keluarga, a weekly family programme. Shortly after, he received another hosting job, this time on Hiburan Minggu Ini, an entertainment programme. Suhaimi was offered the role of maintenance man Sulaiman Yusof in the sitcom Living with Lydia, starring alongside Hong Kong comedian Lydia Shum. He accepted the job, and his character proved a hit with viewers of the sitcom. It would be Suhaimi's first role in English television as well as his acting debut.

In 2001, Suhaimi quit radio to focus more on television. At that point, he had already become an assistant programme director on Malay radio station Warna 94.2FM. He has then acted in 2 more Mediacorp Channel 5 sitcoms, notably as Sgt Dollah Abu Bakar in Police & Thief and "mat rock" reporter Jojo Joget in The Noose.

In 2011, as part of the Mother Tongue Language Fortnight, initiated by the Singapore Ministry of Education, Suhaimi was invited by the Malay Department of Pei Tong Primary School to give a motivational talk for parents on how to motivate their children.

In early 2012, Suhaimi made a controversial move by writing an open letter on Facebook criticising Mediacorp Suria for not showing enough appreciation for local talents, and called on other Malay Singaporean actors to seek a better future in Malaysia instead. This caused a stir on the local Malay entertainment scene. Suhaimi later explained that it was "constructive criticism" and it "wasn't a personal attack on anyone in Suria".

In 2012, Suhaimi directed and produced an untitled 15-episode comedy series for Astro and has also landed his first role on the big screen as a murder suspect in the upcoming Malay suspense film Psycho.

Suhaimi's comedy is rooted in stand-up. He counts American comedians such as Bill Cosby, Robin Williams, Will Smith and David Letterman as influences.

=== Business ===
Suhaimi and his wife run an events management and production house called Q & Que, where Suhaimi is creative director. Suhaimi also produces VCDs and DVDs of his comedy performances distributed by Life Records. The first product, entitled Keramat Bernisan, was a live recording and was released in 2004. 25,000 copies were sold in Singapore within three weeks. Subsequently, he produced a series of successful Comedy DVD series, most notably the "Takleh Angkat" series that became an iconic comedy favourite for the local Malay Community as well as abroad. More than 150,000 official copies of Suhaimi's VCDs and DVDs have been sold.

== Personal life ==
Suhaimi is married to Siti Yuhana Sulaiman (born 1969) and they have two sons and a daughter. In 2024, Yusof was admitted to Tan Tock Seng Hospital after suffering a cerebellar stroke. His doctor conducted multiple tests and confirmed that he suffered a cerebellar stroke. On 21 July 2026, Suhaimi welcomed his 1st grandchild.

=== Incident ===
In 2024, during Ramadan, Suhaimi went to a Ramadan bazaar in Admiralty and to buy food for iftar, the fast-breaking evening meal. He noticed a drinks stall at the bazaar, and offered to film the stall and also to purchase $50 worth of drinks for queueing customers. While the stall started to distribute random drinks to the customers, Suhaimi intervened, asking the stall to instead give the customers what they wanted. It was alleged that Suhaimi scolded the stall helpers during the confusion. Sheik Mohammad, the owner of the stall, questioned Suhaimi's motives on TikTok. Suhaimi, in a video uploaded on Facebook, apologised for the confusion caused over the miscommunication and that he had meant no harm and might have inadvertently scolded the helpers unintentionally.

== Awards and nomination ==
Since 2001, Suhaimi received four trophies for The Most Popular Personality Award, four trophies for The Best Host Awards, a trophy for The Best Actor in a Comedic Role Award and a trophy for The Best TV Opening Graphic Award as an Editor in The Singapore Mediacorp Malay TV Award Event, Pesta Perdana.

Suhaimi received the Best Comedy Performance award by an Actor at the 2011 Asian Television Awards for his efforts in The Noose.

He took fourth position in the reality comedy television series Maharaja Lawak Mega.

== Filmography ==
Television Telemovie Drama

Year	Work	Role	Notes	Ref.
2002–2005	Living with Lydia	Sulaiman	First role in English TV Sitcom	
2004–2010	Police & Thief	Sgt Dollah Abu Bakar		
2006-2008	Maggi & Me	Sgt Dollah Abu Bakar		
2008 –2017	The Noose	Multiple Characters	Prominently as Jojo Joget	
2007	Kecoh Kecoh Nak Raya	Imam Qunot	Produced, Directed and Acted	
2007	Takleh Angkat Beb!	Multiple Characters	Sensasi	
2008	Cosmo & George	Black Hole	Okto	
2008	Takleh Angkat Kelakar Rebak!	Hang Toi, Babuji	Written, Produced, Directed, Acted	
2008	Sentel Power	Mat Gangster		
2008	Kecoh Kecoh Raya	Angah		
2008-2009	TATV	Multiple Characters	Sensasi	
2010	Camy & Dee	Camy	Suria	
2010	Anything Goes			
2011	Zero Hero	Disgusto	Okto	
2011–2015	Maharaja Lawak Mega	Himself	Astro Warna	
2012-2014	Super Spontan	Himself	Astro Warna	
2014	R&D		Suria	
2017-2018	Life Less Ordinary	Rashid Bin Mohamed	Channel 8	
2018	Say Cheese!	Kaamil	Channel 8	
2019	How Are You?	Sulaiman	Channel 8	

Film

Year	Work	Role	Notes	Ref.
2007	Just Follow Law	Bamboo		
2011	The Ghosts Must Be Crazy	Reservist Private/PTE Soldier		
2011	Aku Tak Bodoh	School Principal	Malay Remake of I Not Stupid Too (2006)	
2013	Psiko: Pencuri Hati (Thief of Heart)	Pak Abu		
2016	Long Long Time Ago	Osman		
2016	Long Long Time Ago 2	Osman		
2016	Lulu the Movie			
2017	Lucky Boy			
2019	When Ghost Meets Zombie	Boat Man		
2020	The Diam Diam Era	Osman		
2021	The Diam Diam Era Two	Osman		
2026	A Singapore Dementia Story		Short film	

Shows Hosted

Year	Work	Notes
1991-2001	Morning Breakfast Radio Show	As Deejay
2001 / 2007	Anugerah Planet Muzik (Music Awards)	As co-Host
1992-1999	Hiburan Minggu Ini (Malay Variety Weekly)	As Anchor Host for the "live" show
2001-2018	Sinar Lebaran (Hari Raya yearly TV Show)	As Host
2002-2008	Selamat Pagi Singapura	Food segment host & Anchor Host
2004-2007	Rancangan 647 (Light-hearted Current Affairs)	As Host
2012	Sasuke Singapore	as Co-Host
2013	School Days 1 & 2	Host and actor of younger version of male guests

== Awards and nominations ==
Organisation	Year	Award	Nominated work	Result	Ref.
Asian Television Awards	2011	Best Comedy Performance	The Noose	Won	
Asian Television Awards	2012	Best Comedy Performance	The Noose	Nominated (Highly commended)	
