= Long Long Time Ago 2 =

Singaporean period and comedy film

- Theatrical release poster
- Directed by: Jack Neo
- Written by: Jack Neo; Link Sng; Ivan Ho
- Produced by: Jack Neo; Melvin Ang
- Starring: Aileen Tan; Mark Lee; Wang Lei; Ng Suan Loi; Charmaine Sei; Benjamin Josiah Tan; Ryan Lian; Cynthia Kuang; Yan Li Xuan; Suhaimi Yusof; Nurijah Binte Sahat; Silvarajoo Prakasam; Bharathi Rani
- Cinematography: Nian Rui Wen; Saravanann
- Edited by: Hamster Low; Kenzir Leow
- Music by: Zheng Kai Hua; Matthew Teng
- Production companies: J Team Productions mm2 Entertainment
- Distributed by: Golden Village Pictures
- Release date: 31 March 2016
- Running time: 121 minutes
- Country: Singapore
- Languages: Hokkien; Teochew; Malay; English; Tamil
- Budget: $5 million (shared with Long Long Time Ago)
- Box office: S$3 million

Long Long Time Ago 2 (Chinese: 我们的故事2) is a 2016 Singaporean period film and comedy film directed by Jack Neo. The film commemorates Singapore's 50th birthday or SG50 and stars Aileen Tan, Mark Lee and Wang Lei as the main casts. The film was released on 31 March 2016. It also marks the third on-screen reunion of Mark Lee and Suhaimi Yusof after they starred alongside together in the popular Singaporean sitcom named Police & Thief.

== Plot ==
Continuing from Long Long Time Ago, Lim Zhao Di (Aileen Tan) takes over her family farm with the help of Ah Long (Ryan Lian) after the 1969 floods. After the government started reclaiming land for development in 1977, licensed owners like Zhao Di are compensated but her younger brother Lim Ah Kun (Mark Lee) accuses her of having an affair with Ah Long to get the money for himself. Osman (Suhaimi Yusof) does not approve his son playing in a rock band as he fears the negative influence, causing his son to run away from home. Meanwhile, Zhao Di's youngest brother Lim Ah Hee (Benjamin Josiah Tan) and Rani (Bharathi Rani) decide to get married but their traditional fathers Si Shu (Wang Lei) and Shamugen (Silvarajoo Prakasam) object their marriage.

== Cast ==
- Aileen Tan as Lim Zhao Di
- Mark Lee as Lim Ah Kun, Zhao Di's younger brother
- Wang Lei as Si Shu, Zhao Di's father
- Ng Suan Loi as Si Shen, Zhao Di's mother
- Charmaine Sei as Ah Feng, Ah Kun's wife
- Benjamin Josiah Tan as Lim Ah Hee, Zhao Di's youngest brother who is among the first batch of National Servicemen
- Ryan Lian as Ah Long, a Loan Shark and Gangster Boss
- Cynthia Kuang as Su Ting, Zhao Di's eldest daughter
  - Yan Li Xuan as young Su Ting
- Suhaimi Yusof as Osman, a Nasi Lemak Seller
- Nurijah Binte Sahat as Fatimah, Osman's wife
- Silvarajoo Prakasam as Shamugen, a Hawker Inspector turned People's Association Officer
- Bharathi Rani as Rani, Shamugen's daughter, Ah Hee's girlfriend and later wife
- Mastura Ahmad as the Nurse attending to Osman and Fatimah
- Yoo Ah Min as Si Shu and Shi Shen's good friend and neighbour
- Zhang Wei as the Lim's family good friend and neighbour

== Production ==
=== Filming ===
The film was filmed in Ipoh, Malaysia, especially in Kampung Cina Pusing together with the first part, starting in May 2015 for over 60 days.

While filming a scene of a sister rescuing her younger brother from a toilet he is stuck in, director Jack Neo insisted on a close-up shot of real faeces to show audiences what toilets in the 1960s were really like. For historical accuracy, Neo also requested actress Aileen Tan to grow her armpit hair for a brief show of it when her character, wearing a sleeveless blouse, raises her arms to tie her hair while working at a coal mine.

The scene of Ah Kun (Mark Lee) slapping his niece and nephew is real. The actors did over ten takes.

Familiar to Vasantham viewers, actress Bharathi Rani plays Rani in her first non-Tamil production.

=== Music video ===
The official music video of the film was released on YouTube on 14 April 2016. It was directed by Shawn Tan and cinematography was by Lincoln Lin of Famegate Studios.

== Reception ==
=== Critical reception ===
Reception was mostly positive.

John Lui of The Straits Times gave the film 2.5/5. He praised the "personal" "small moments" but criticised how "what little authenticity that can be glimpsed is buried under a treacly layer of television-style drama". In addition, he found that "[a]lmost every moment is freighted with moral significance, heavily underscored by dialogue and music" and "[f]or all the suffering, shame and strife baked into the story, there's little inner life to the characters".

Rating the film 2/5, Whang Yee-ling of 8 Days noted that Jack Neo "seems emotionally and creatively depleted after putting much of his heart into writing-directing Long Long Time Ago" and that "even Neo's ear for vernacular humour fails him, and the Hokkien exchanges are strained". She also criticised the film's "simplistic lessons on racial harmony in addition to intergenerational strife". She concluded, "The story is merely marking time, the characters remaining one-note types over the decade".

Similarly, Yahoo! News Singapore found Long Long Time Ago 2 "not as good" as its first part, giving it a score of 3.5/5. While praising the film's "[c]ompelling family drama" and "refreshing take on relationships in Singapore", they noted that it "doesn’t provide the proper cathartic resolution to the many conflicts that arise", with "[t]oo many characters and plots to keep track of", "blatant product placement" and a "downer" of a "weak resolution".

Jeremy Sing of SINdie found the "discrepancy" in the two parts "so great", with Part Two filled with "preachiness, television-style histronics... in-your-face product placements" and "a paper-thin plot". While he praised the film for "bravely tackling a sensitive topic" of the interracial marriage between Ah Hee and Rani, Sing criticised the overall "weak plot development, characterisation, trite direction and its propensity to ‘teach’ the audience what we were supposed to gather from the film".

=== Box office ===
Long Long Time Ago 2 was ranked second in the Singapore box office to Batman v Superman: Dawn of Justice in its opening week. It earned $3.02 million to date. The total local box office of two films is over $7.1 million.

== Future ==
After the previous film and this film, Director Jack Neo and producers have planned for four instalments for this film series, but production of parts 3 and 4 depends on the box office results of the first two films. Neo states he still has many more stories from 1978 to 2016 to explore. And after he explored, he eventually made parts 3 and 4 known as The Diam Diam Era and The Diam Diam Era Two.
