= The Diam Diam Era =

2020 Singaporean drama film

- Directed by: Jack Neo
- Written by: Jack Neo; Ivan Ho
- Produced by: Boi Kwong
- Starring: Mark Lee; Richie Koh; Danny Lee; Mei Xin; Henry Thia; Wang Lei; Benjamin Josiah Tan; Regina Lim; Yap Hui Xin; Charmaine Sei; Tasha Low; Silvarajoo Prakasam; Suhaimi Yusof
- Cinematography: Malek Hue
- Edited by: Yim Mun Chong; Loo Chean Hoong
- Music by: Matthew Teng
- Production companies: J Team Productions; MM2 Entertainment
- Distributed by: Golden Village Pictures
- Release date: 26 November 2020 (Singapore)
- Running time: 107 minutes
- Country: Singapore
- Languages: Mandarin; Hokkien; English
- Box office: S$1,515,868

The Diam Diam Era (Chinese: 我们的故事之沉默的年代) is a 2020 Singaporean comedy film directed by Jack Neo. Set in the 1980s, it tells the story of the Lim family moving from kampong to HDB Flats. Through major policy changes and political climate in the era, they experience great changes in their lives and environment. It is the sequel to Long Long Time Ago and Long Long Time Ago 2.

It was released on 26 November 2020 in Singaporean cinemas. The film stars an ensemble cast, which includes Mark Lee, Richie Koh, Danny Lee, Mei Xin, Henry Thia, Wang Lei, Benjamin Josiah Tan, Regina Lim, Yap Hui Xin, Charmaine Sei, Tasha Low, Silvarajoo Prakasam, and Suhaimi Yusof. It also marks the fourth on-screen reunion of Mark Lee and Suhaimi Yusof after they starred alongside together in the popular Singaporean sitcom named Police & Thief.

== Plot ==
Continuing from Long Long Time Ago 2, this film is set from the year 1979 until the late 1980s. It follows the story of the Lim family's second generation moving from kampong to HDB Flats, as they experience great changes in Singapore's environment, policies, and livelihood.

After the death of his father, Si Shu (Wang Lei), his mother, Si Shen (Ng Suan Loi), and his older sister, Lim Zhao Di (Aileen Tan), Lim Ah Kun (Mark Lee) has turned over a new leaf and continued his old profession as a taxi driver. He often argued with his son, Lim Yong Xin (Danny Lee) whom he had with a songstress outside of his marriage and nephew, Phua Shun Fa (Richie Koh) due to differences in their views because of generation gap. During that time, Singapore was going through a number of reform policies, such as the forced closure of Chinese schools and the introduction of a Singaporean elite system.

The film also focused on the troubled relationship between Yong Xin and Shun Fa, as the former is an egoistic jerk, as he is an overachiever, especially in English and Mathematics and for this reason, looks down on the latter, who is exactly the opposite due to the latter being Chinese Educated and having difficulties solving Mathematics questions as they have all been varied from Chinese to English to keep up with the times. Yong Xin even resorts to using Shun Fa as a scapegoat just to get out of trouble and save his reputation, as the former wanted to achieve a scholarship in the Singapore Armed Forces and Singapore Army and held the rank of Second Lieutenant (2LT) and got promoted to Lieutenant (LTA) after a while.

Ah Kun became dissatisfied with many of the government policies. He decided to speak out by setting up a new opposition party known as C.M.I. (the abbreviation of Chinese, Malay and Indian) to contest in the 1988 general election by teaming up with his younger brother Lim Ah Hee's (Benjamin Josiah Tan)'s father-in-law and former hawker inspector and People's Association officer named Shamugam (Silvarajoo Prakasam) and nasi lemak seller named Osman (Suhaimi Yusof). How will the story of their lives go?

== Cast ==
Cast	Character's name	Details
Mark Lee	Lim Ah Kun	Taxi Driver; often dissatisfied with the new policies
Richie Koh	Phua Shun Fa	Ah Kun's Nephew
Danny Lee	Lim Yong Xin	Ah Kun's Son and Lovechild
Mei Xin	Phua Su Ting	Shun Fa's Eldest Sister
Henry Thia	Ah Hui	Ah Kun's Best Friend
Wang Lei	Liu Shun Zhong	Leader of another Opposition Party known as Challenge Party
Benjamin Josiah Tan	Lim Ah Hee	Ah Kun's Younger Brother
Regina Lim	Phua Su Xin	Shun Fa's Second Elder Sister
Yap Hui Xin	Phua Su Qing	Shun Fa's Third Elder Sister
Charmaine Sei	Ah Feng	Ah Kun's Wife and Yong Xin's Stepmother
Tasha Low	Mei Ping	Xinyao Singer and Shun Fa's Girlfriend
Silvarajoo Prakasam	Shamugam	Ah Hee's father-in-law; Former Hawker Inspector and People's Association Officer, now retired
Suhaimi Yusof	Osman	Nasi Lemak Seller

== Production ==
The film was originally titled Not So Long Time Ago. The film budget is $2.5 million; filming lasted from April to May 2019. The film continues to showcase Singapore's multicultural society and its history from the founding to becoming an advanced country.

This film and the next film are set in the 1980s, and touched on politically sensitive topics, in particular several major policy changes implemented during the era, including the forced closure of Chinese schools and Nanyang University, the frustration among Chinese school students, the Singapore elite system, and opposition parties. It also explores the life views and differences between the younger and older generation, their different reactions towards the policies implemented during the era.

Regarding the subject matter, Neo states that “Although the subject is sensitive, it is part of history. It should be viewed with a correct attitude. Singaporeans should understand the history of their own country. We are not trying to deliberately touch on sensitive subjects; instead, we just do not want to hide what happened in history."

== Release ==
The film held sneak peaks on 22 November 2020, was released on 26 November 2020 theatrically in Singapore.

Its sequel and the overall fourth film, The Diam Diam Era Two, was released on 10 February 2021 during the Chinese New Year holiday.
