= The Diam Diam Era Two =

2021 Singaporean drama film

- Theatrical release poster
- Directed by: Jack Neo
- Written by: Jack Neo; Ivan Ho
- Produced by: Boi Kwong
- Starring: Mark Lee; Henry Thia; Wang Lei; Suhaimi Yusof; Silvarajoo Prakasam; Richie Koh; Danny Lee; Mei Xin; Benjamin Josiah Tan; Regina Lim; Yap Hui Xin; Charmaine Sei; Ryan Lian; Tasha Low; Nurijah Binte Sahat; Bharathi D/O Rani; Joshua Ang
- Cinematography: Malek Hue
- Edited by: Yim Mun Chong; Loo Chean Hoong
- Music by: Matthew Teng
- Production companies: J Team Productions; MM2 Entertainment
- Distributed by: Golden Village Pictures
- Release date: 11 February 2021
- Running time: 91 minutes
- Country: Singapore
- Languages: Mandarin; Hokkien; English; Malay; Tamil

The Diam Diam Era Two (Chinese: 我们的故事之沉默的年代2) is a 2021 Singaporean comedy film directed by Jack Neo. Continuing the story of the Lim family, set in 1988 general election, it tells the story as Lim Ah Kun (Mark Lee), Osman Bin Yusuf (Suhaimi Yusof) and Shamugam S/O Vellasami (Silvarajoo Prakasam) form a seemingly funny but serious opposition party C.M.I. (the abbreviation of Chinese, Malay and Indian), and compete in the fierce election showdown. It is the sequel to Long Long Time Ago, Long Long Time Ago 2 and The Diam Diam Era.

The film stars veteran local comedy actors Mark Lee, Henry Thia and Wang Lei. It is released on 11 February 2021 in Singaporean cinemas. Other ensemble cast includes Suhaimi Yusof, Silvarajoo Prakasam, Richie Koh, Danny Lee, Mei Xin, Benjamin Josiah Tan, Regina Lim, Yap Hui Xin, Charmaine Sei, Ryan Lian, Tasha Low, Nurijah Binte Sahat, Bharathi D/O Rani and Joshua Ang. The film is the only local Singaporean film releasing during the 2021 Chinese New Year period. It also marks the fifth on-screen reunion of Mark Lee and Suhaimi Yusof after they starred alongside together in the popular Singaporean sitcom named Police & Thief.

== Plot ==
Continuing from The Diam Diam Era, this film is set in 1988 general election, as Lim Ah Kun (Mark Lee) become more dissatisfied with the government policies, he decides to form a new opposition party after being rejected to join Liu Shun Zhong's (Wang Lei)'s party in the previous film. To compete for seats in the Toa Payoh GRC (which was changed to "Gim Wang GRC" in the film) where he lives at a Toa Payoh HDB Flat located at Blk 128 Toa Payoh Lorong 1, Ah Kun teams up with nasi lemak seller named Osman Bin Yusuf (Suhaimi Yusof) and his younger brother Lim Ah Hee's (Benjamin Josiah Tan)'s father-in-law and former hawker inspector and People's Association officer named Shamugam S/O Vellasami (Silvarajoo Prakasam) to form a new opposition party named C.M.I. (the abbreviation of Chinese, Malay and Indian) and contest in the general election.

As their campaign gets more intense, both Ah Kun and Lim Zhao Di's (Aileen Tan)'s families get dragged in. Will Shun Fa (Richie Koh) and Yong Xin (Danny Lee) resolve their differences? The fervent of campaigning has swept up both Ah Kun's and Zhao Di's family. As Ah Kun thinks of many ways to garner support, will both families be dragged in as well? Can Ah Kun, Osman and Shamugam really win the election?

== Cast ==
Cast	Character's name	Details
Mark Lee	Lim Ah Kun	Taxi Driver; often dissatisfied with the new policies Founder of C.M.I. Party
Henry Thia	Ah Hui	Ah Kun's best friend
Wang Lei	Liu Shun Zhong	Leader of another Opposition Party known as Challenge Party, and also a general contractor with his own workers and construction company, similar to Phua Chu Kang (Gurmit Singh) from Phua Chu Kang Pte Ltd, Phua Chu Kang Sdn Bhd and Phua Chu Kang The Movie
Suhaimi Yusof	Osman Bin Yusuf	Leader of C.M.I. Party and Nasi Lemak Seller
Silvarajoo Prakasam	Shamugam S/O Vellasami	Leader of C.M.I. Party and Ah Hee's father-in-law and also former Hawker Inspector and People's Association Officer, now retired
Richie Koh	Phua Shun Fa	Ah Kun's nephew
Danny Lee	Lim Yong Xin	Ah Kun's son and lovechild
Mei Xin	Phua Su Ting	Shun Fa's eldest sister
Benjamin Josiah Tan	Lim Ah Hee	Ah Kun's younger brother
Regina Lim	Phua Su Xin	Shun Fa's second elder sister
Yap Hui Xin	Phua Su Qing	Shun Fa's third elder sister
Charmaine Sei	Ah Feng	Ah Kun's wife and Yong Xin's stepmother
Ryan Lian	Ah Long	Former Loan Shark and Gangster Boss and currently working as a Police Officer
Tasha Low	Mei Ping	Xinyao Singer; Shun Fa's girlfriend
Nurijah Binte Sahat	Fatimah Binte Yusuf	Osman's wife
Bharathi D/O Rani	Rani D/O Shamugam	Shamugam's daughter and Ah Hee's wife
Joshua Ang	Yao Dong	A Police Officer working under Ah Long and Su Qing's new boyfriend

== Production ==
The film continues the series in showcasing Singapore's multicultural society, and its history from its founding to becoming an advanced country.

This film and the previous film are set in the 1980s, and touch on politically sensitive topics, such as several major policy changes implemented in the era, opposition parties, and the details of 1980s general election and campaigning.

Regarding the subject matter, Neo states that: “Although the subject is sensitive, it is part of history. It should be viewed with a correct attitude. Singaporeans should understand the history of their own country. We are not trying to deliberately touch on sensitive subjects, instead we just do not want to hide what happened in history."

== Release ==
This film was released on 11 February 2021 in Singaporean cinema during the Chinese New Year holiday.
