= Aileen Tan =

Singaporean actress

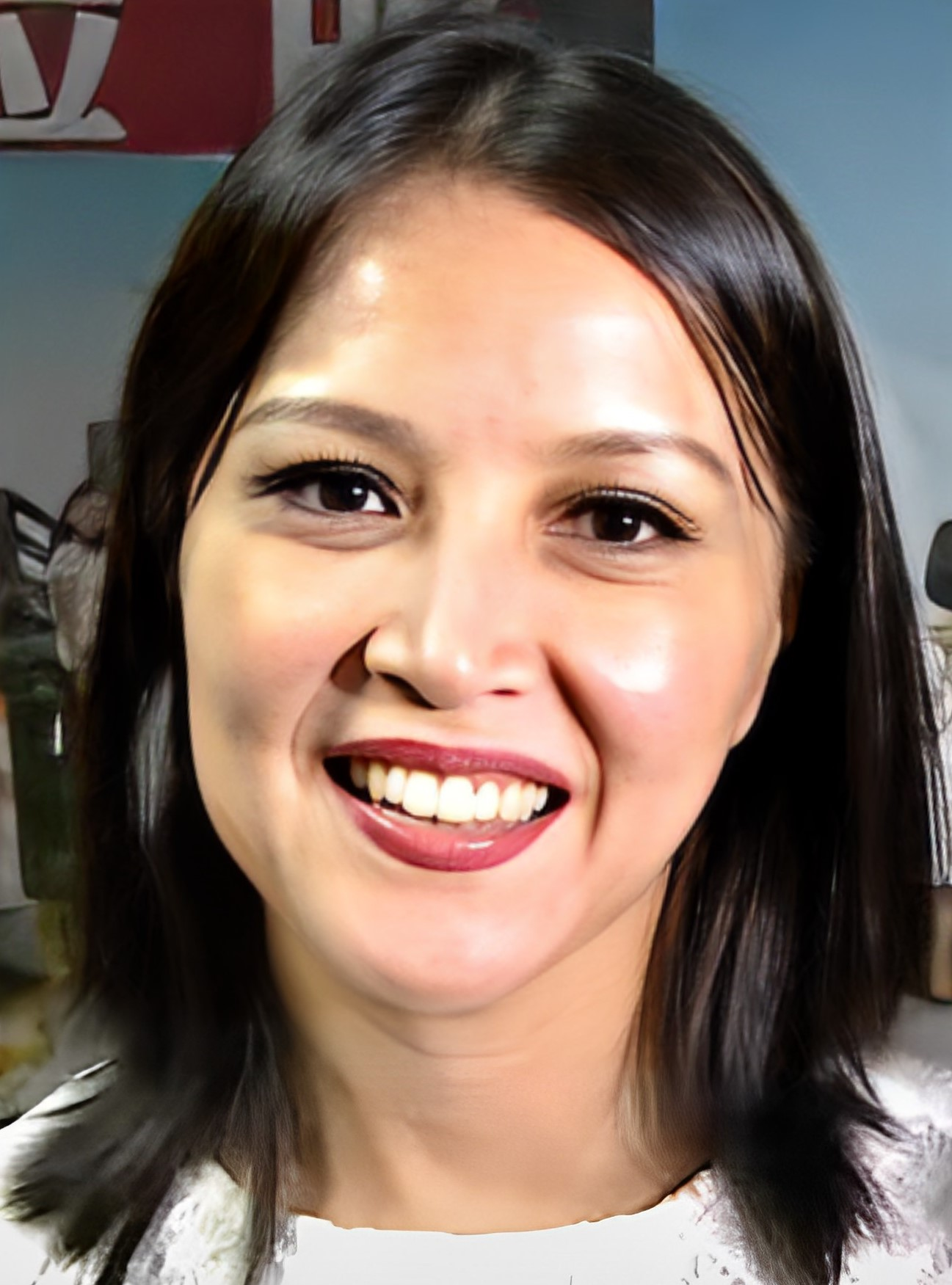
- Tan in July 2016
- Born: Singapore
- Education: Willow Secondary School
- Occupation: Actress
- Years active: 1988–present
- Spouse: Gerald Lee (m. 2002)
- Awards: Full list

Chinese name
- Traditional Chinese: 陳麗貞
- Simplified Chinese: 陈丽贞
- Hanyu Pinyin: Chén Lìzhēn

Aileen Tan Lay Ching is a Singaporean actress.

== Life and career ==
Tan studied at Willow Secondary School. Tan worked in sales for more than a year before becoming an office administrator at an advertising agency.

Tan participated in Singapore Broadcasting Corporation's inaugural Star Search in 1988 and was placed second behind Zoe Tay. She also won the award for Most Photogenic.

Tan also ventured into English dramas. In 2000, she played Mae in MediaCorp Channel 5's longest-running drama series, Growing Up. Later in 2009, she played Suzanne Kong, the wife of a tycoon in the 40-episode drama Red Thread. In 2013, Tan won Best Actress in a Supporting Role at the 18th Asian Television Awards (ATA) for her role in The Day It Rained on Our Parade which consisted of four episodes. On 29 May 2015, it was announced that Tan will play the lead role in Jack Neo's film, Long Long Time Ago alongside Mark Lee and Wang Lei.

== Personal life ==
Tan married Hong Kong film director Gerald Lee in 2002. She experienced an ectopic pregnancy in 2006, which eventually led to an abortion.

== Filmography ==
=== Television series ===
Year	Title	Role	Notes	Ref.
1988	My Fair Ladies (窈窕淑女)	Ye Shuilian		
1989	The Fortune Hunters (钻石人生)	Li Qiumei	Cameo	
1989	Good Morning, Sir!	Zhu Peiqi		
1989	Turn of the Tide (浮沉)	Li Meifang		
1990	The Finishing Line (出人头地)	Xia Miaoran		
1990	Journey's End (生命街车)	Qi Guigui		
1990	Happy World	Zhen Meili		
1991	The Darkest Hour (烈血青春)	Pang Lixue		
1991	Black Phoenix (黑凤凰)	Xiao Yunhong		
1992	Love Is in the Air (爱在女儿乡)	Xia Ni		
1992	Mystery II (迷离夜II 之《问我是谁》)	Huang Shuzhen		
1993	Angel of Vengeance (暴雨狂花)	Defence attorney	Special appearance	
1993	Battle of Justice (人海孤鸿)	Leiyin		
1994	Bond of Love (情网)	Luo Qingyi		
1994	Scorned Angel (冷太阳)	Jiang Hailun		
1994	Dr Justice (法医故事)	Yang Xiaofan		
1995	Deep Within My Heart (爱在心处)	Li Qimei		
1995	Dr. Justice II (法医故事II)	Yang Xiaofan		
1995	The Blazing Trail			
1996	River of Love (风雨柴船头)	Sun Yunfang		
1996	New Brave World (新阿郎)	Ye Ling		
1997	Crimes & Tribulations (狮城奇案录 之 第一个上绞台的女人)	Jian Mimi		
1997	My Wife, Your Wife, Their Wives (101老婆 之 赌神背后的女人)			
1998	My Little Angels (我家小豆豆)	Zheng Minghui		
1998	The Scam (豪门奇骗)	Yang Wenqian		
1998	The New Adventures of Wisely	Bei Mengdan		
1999	P.I. Blues (乌龙档案)	Qiu Xiaoyu		
2000	My Home Affairs (家事)	Hong Liqing		
2000	Adam's Company (亚当周记)	Angel		
2000–2001	Growing Up	Mae		
2001	Three Women and a Half	Huang Tianli (Jane)		
2001	The Hotel	Yang Ruizhen	Cameo	
2002	Beautiful Connection	Fan Keli		
2003	Health Matters 2 (一切由慎开始 2 之《天职》)	Huang Aiqin		
2003	Romance De Amour	Kang Li		
2004	Crime Hunters (心网追凶)	Fang Jiesi		
2004	When The Time Comes (一线之间)	Wang Wenxuan		
2004	Double Happiness	Luo Jiayu		
2004	Double Happiness II	Luo Jiayu		
2005	Love Concierge (爱的掌门人)	Producer Xu		
2006	Women of Times	Cynthia Jia Zengyue		
2006	Measure of Man	Patricia		
2007	Mars vs Venus	Li Yulian		
2007	The Greatest Love of All	Mo Lihua		
2008	Our Rice House	Li Ying		
2008	Nanny Daddy	Sophia Feng		
2008	Love Blossoms II	Daisy Ma		
2009	Red Thread (红色线)	Suzanne		
2009	My Buddy	Ye Peiyi		
2009	Together	Liu Maomao		
2011	Prosperity	Tang Aili		
2011	C.L.I.F.	Situ Yan		
2011	Devotion	Wu Aihao		
2011	Love Thy Neighbour	Lucy		
2012	The Day It Rained on Our Parade	Fei-ma		
2012	The Enchanted	Huang Songli		
2013	C.L.I.F. 2	Situ Yan		
2013	Mata Mata	Yoke Lien	Channel 5 series	
2013	The Enchanted	Huang Songli		
2014	Entangled	Lin Yueqin		
2014	World at Your Feet	Ye Laixiang		
2014	Mata Mata 2	Yoke Lien	Channel 5 series	
2015	Life Is Beautiful	Chen Miaoyu		
2015	The Journey: Our Homeland	Yang Lihua		
2015	Life - Fear Not	Zhuang Daomei		
2016	The Dream Job	Wang Bizhi		
2016	Eat Already?	Aunt Ah Shun		
2016	Hero	Huang Lili		
2017	Happy Can Already!	Yankee		
2017	Dream Coder	He Xiuxiang		
2017	Eat Already? 2	Ah Shun-Sao		
2017	Have A Little Faith	Zhuang Kelian		
2018	Life Less Ordinary	Liew Xiuqin		
2018	Fifty & Fabulous (五零高手)	Liang Meimei		
2018	You Can Be An Angel 3 (你也可以是天使 3)	Zhou Lilian		
2019	If Only (离归)	Hong Jie	Directional debut project	
2019	Hello Ms Driver (下一站，遇见)	Zheng Xueqin		
2019	I See You (看见看不见的你)	Peng Meifen		
2020	Happy Prince (快乐王子)	Sonia		
2020	All Around You (回路网)	Cai Yufeng		
2021	My Star Bride	Tang Liyin		
2021	321 Action! (凶手的自白)	Wang Yaci		
2021	The Peculiar Pawnbroker (人心鉴定师)	Lin Meimei		
2022	I Want to be a Tow Kay (亲家冤家做头家)	Lucy Leow		
2022	Twisted Strings (良辰吉时)	Xiao Yu	HBO series	
2022	When Duty Calls 2 (卫国先锋2)	Cai Xiuling		
2022	Dark Angel (黑天使)	Alex		
2023	Fix My Life	Ling Jie		
2023	Shero	Chen Meihua		
2023	I Do, Do I?	Hong Lixia		

=== Film ===
Year	Title	Role	Notes	Ref.
1994	The Blazing Trail (兰桂坊血案)	Li Shali	Telemovie	
1994	A Chance of Life (一线生机)	Fang Suwen	Telemovie	
1995	The Ultimate Truth (惊魂恋)	Zhou Jing	Telemovie	
1996	Ace Cops (妙警点38)	Yao Jingjing	Telemovie	
1997	Grandpa's Bak Kut Teh (阿公肉骨茶)	A-Yu	Telemovie	
2002	Angel Heart (天使心)		Feature film	
2015	Ah Boys to Men 3: Frogmen	Lobang's mother	Feature film	
2016	Long Long Time Ago	Lim Zhao Di	Feature film	
2016	Long Long Time Ago 2	Lim Zhao Di	Feature film	
2018	Wonderful! Liang Xi Mei	Mrs Lu	Feature film	
2020	The Diam Diam Era	Lim Zhaodi	Feature film	
2022	The Betrothal Ceremony	Ryan's mother	Short film	

== Awards and nominations ==
Year	Ceremony	Category	Nominated work	Result	Ref
1994	Star Awards	Top 5 Most Popular Female Artistes	—N/a	Won	
1995	Star Awards	Top 5 Most Popular Female Artistes	—N/a	Nominated	
1995	Star Awards	Best Actress	The Blazing Trail (as Li Shali)	Nominated	
1996	Star Awards	Top 10 Most Popular Female Artistes	—N/a	Nominated	
1996	Star Awards	Best Actress	Ace Cops (as Yao Jingjing)	Nominated	
1997	Star Awards	Best Actress	Agong Bak Kut Teh (as Yu)	Nominated	
1997	Star Awards	Top 10 Most Popular Female Artistes	—N/a	Won	
1998	Star Awards	Top 10 Most Popular Female Artistes	—N/a	Nominated	
2001	Star Awards	Best Actress	Three Women and a Half (as Jane)	Won	
2001	Star Awards	Top 10 Most Popular Female Artistes	—N/a	Nominated	
2002	Asian Television Awards	Best Actress in a Leading Role	Three Women and a Half (as Jane)	Nominated	
2002	Star Awards	Best Actress	Beautiful Connection (as Fang Keli)	Nominated	
2002	Star Awards	Top 10 Most Popular Female Artistes	—N/a	Nominated	
2003	Star Awards	Best Actress	Romance De Amour (as Kang Li)	Nominated	
2003	Star Awards	Top 10 Most Popular Female Artistes	—N/a	Nominated	
2010	Star Awards	Best Supporting Actress	Together (as Liu Mao Mao)	Nominated	
2012	Star Awards	Top 10 Most Popular Female Artistes	—N/a	Nominated	
2013	Asian Television Awards	Best Actress in a Supporting Role	The Day It Rained on Our Parade (as Fei-Ma)	Won	
2014	Star Awards	Best Supporting Actress	C.L.I.F. 2 (as Seetoh Yan)	Nominated	
2016	Star Awards	Top 10 Most Popular Female Artistes	—N/a	Nominated	
2017	Star Awards	Best Evergreen Artiste	Hero (as Huang Lili)	Nominated	
2017	Star Awards	Best Supporting Actress	Hero (as Huang Lili)	Won	
2017	Star Awards	Top 10 Most Popular Female Artistes	—N/a	Nominated	
2018	Star Awards	Best Supporting Actress	Have A Little Faith (as Zhuang Kelian)	Nominated	
2018	Star Awards	Top 10 Most Popular Female Artistes	—N/a	Nominated	
2018	Star Awards	Best Theme Song	Life Less Ordinary ("小人物向前冲")	Nominated	
2019	Star Awards	Best Supporting Actress	You Can Be An Angel 3 (as Zhou Lilian)	Nominated	
2019	Star Awards	Best Evergreen Artiste	—N/a	Nominated	
2019	Star Awards	Top 10 Most Popular Female Artistes	—N/a	Nominated	
2021	Star Awards	Best Supporting Actress	Hello Miss Driver (as Zheng Xueqin)	Nominated	
2021	Star Awards	Top 10 Most Popular Female Artistes	—N/a	Nominated	
2022	Star Awards	Top 10 Most Popular Female Artistes	—N/a	Nominated	
2023	Star Awards	Best Supporting Actress	Dark Angel (as Alex)	Nominated	
2023	Star Awards	Best Evergreen Artiste	—N/a	Nominated	
2023	Star Awards	Top 10 Most Popular Female Artistes	—N/a	Nominated	
2024	Star Awards	Best Supporting Actress	Shero (as Chen Meihua)	Won	
2025	Star Awards	Top 10 Most Popular Female Artistes	—N/a	Nominated	
2026	Star Awards	Top 10 Most Popular Female Artistes	—N/a	Nominated	
