= Long Long Time Ago =

- Theatrical release poster
- 我们的故事
- Directed by: Jack Neo
- Written by: Jack Neo; Link Sng; Ivan Ho
- Produced by: Jack Neo; Melvin Ang
- Starring: Aileen Tan; Mark Lee; Wang Lei; Ng Suan Loi; Charmaine Sei; Benjamin Josiah Tan; Ryan Lian; Yan Li Xuan; Suhaimi Yusof; Nurijah Binte Sahat; Silvarajoo Prakasam; Bharathi Rani
- Cinematography: Nian Rui Wen; Saravanann
- Edited by: Hamster Low; Kenzir Leow
- Music by: Zheng Kai Hua; Matthew Teng
- Production companies: J Team Productions mm2 Entertainment
- Distributed by: Golden Village Pictures; J Team Productions mm2 Entertainment
- Release date: 4 February 2016
- Running time: 107 minutes
- Country: Singapore
- Languages: Hokkien; Teochew; Malay; English
- Budget: $5 million (shared with Long Long Time Ago 2)
- Box office: $4.2 million

Long Long Time Ago (Chinese: 我们的故事; Hokkien: 我儂个故事; POJ: Guá-lâng ê kòo-sīr; literally "Our Story") is a 2016 Singaporean period film and comedy film directed by Jack Neo. The film commemorates Singapore's 50th birthday or SG50 and stars Aileen Tan, Mark Lee and Wang Lei as the main casts. It is released on 4 February 2016 in Singapore. It also marks the second on-screen reunion of Mark Lee and Suhaimi Yusof after they starred alongside together in the popular Singaporean sitcom named Police & Thief.

== Plot ==
The story spans from 1965 to the early 1970s. Heavily pregnant Lim Zhao Di (Aileen Tan), the unwanted second wife of an older man, was chased out by her husband's family and forced to return to her own Lim family whom are all living in a kampong, consisting of her father Si Shu (Wang Lei), her mother Si Shen (Ng Suan Loi), and 2 younger brothers Lim Ah Kun (Mark Lee) and Lim Ah Hee (Benjamin Josiah Tan). Ah Kun is a taxi driver and Ah Hee is helping Zhao Di out with her soybean business selling soya bean milk and soya bean curd and serving national service as well. She eventually gave birth to twins, Shun Fa and Su Fang. As Su Fang had two moles on her face, which was said to be bad luck, Zhao Di decided to give her up due to the pressure of wanting to build a better life for the rest of her family. With Zhao Di's indomitable spirit, and with the help of her family, they went through adversities, witnessed the changes through the years, and accompanied every step of the nation's growth in its early years.

== Cast ==
- Aileen Tan as Lim Zhao Di
- Mark Lee as Lim Ah Kun, Zhao Di's younger brother
- Wang Lei as Si Shu, Zhao Di's father
- Ng Suan Loi as Si Shen, Zhao Di's mother
- Charmaine Sei as Ah Feng, Ah Kun's wife
- Benjamin Josiah Tan as Lim Ah Hee, Zhao Di's youngest brother who is among the first batch of National Servicemen
- Ryan Lian as Ah Long, a Loan Shark and Gangster Boss
- Yan Li Xuan as young Su Ting, Zhao Di's eldest daughter
- Suhaimi Yusof as Osman, a Nasi Lemak Seller
- Nurijah Binte Sahat as Fatimah, Osman's wife
- Silvarajoo Prakasam as Shamugen, a Hawker Inspector turned People's Association Officer
- Bharathi Rani as Rani, Shamugen's daughter and Ah Hee's love interest and later wife
- Roy Li as Mr Zhang, Zhao Di and Osman's Benefactor
- Dawn Gan as Ah Kun's Private Taxi Passenger
- Justin Dominic Misson as Police Officer
- Tosh Zhang as 3SG Alex Ong reprising his role from Ah Boys to Men and Ah Boys to Men 2 (cameo)
- Wang Weiliang as CPL Bang "Lobang" Lee Onn reprising his role from Ah Boys to Men and Ah Boys to Men 2 (cameo)
- Joshua Tan as CPL Ken Chow reprising his role from Ah Boys to Men 3: Frogmen (cameo)
- Jaspers Lai as CPL Handsome reprising his role from Ah Boys to Men 3: Frogmen (cameo)
- Jack Neo as Rich Man bringing away Su Fang and looking after her (cameo)
- Irene Kng (Jack Neo's Wife) as Rich Woman bringing away Su Fang and looking after her (cameo)

== Production ==
=== Casting ===
To prepare for her role, Aileen Tan had to improve on her Hokkien and learn some Malay. Due to an accident, she chipped her tooth, but Neo forbade her to fix the chipped upper lateral incisor because he said it gave her character a stronger personality. Meanwhile, Wang Lei had to wear prosthetic teeth and facial hair, and dye his hair white to play the role of a 60 to 70-year-old.

=== Filming ===
The film was inspired by Neo's own childhood of growing up in Kampong Chai Chee, and some scenes were filmed in Ipoh, Malaysia, especially in Kampung Cina Pusing. Filming started in May 2015, with the first and second film shot back-to-back for over 60 days.

The first and second film's total budget was initially $5 million, but because Neo "wanted to make improvements", he "took a cut from my director's fee to make things happen", as a result, it went up to $6 million. A huge amount of resources was involved in the making, such as the construction of a 30m-by-30m pool that is 1.5m deep to film scenes recreating the 1969 Singapore flood. It also introduced Auro-3D for clearer sounds.

While filming a scene of a sister rescuing her younger brother from a toilet he is stuck in, director Jack Neo insisted on a close-up shot of real faeces to show audiences what toilets in the 1960s were really like. For historical accuracy, Neo also requested actress Aileen Tan to grow her armpit hair for a brief show of it when her character, wearing a sleeveless blouse, raises her arms to tie her hair while working at a coal mine.

Familiar to Vasantham viewers, actress Bharathi Rani plays Rani in her first non-Tamil production.

=== Music ===
The theme song for the film, "Our Memories" (我们的回忆), is composed by Matthew Tang with lyrics by Jack Neo and Ivan Ho, and is sung by Getai singers Desmond Ng, Leon Lim, Febe Huang and Sherraine Law.

== Reception ==
=== Critical reception ===
Critical reception was mostly positive.

The New Paper gave it a 4/5 rating, calling it a "tender, fitting paean to our hardworking pioneer generation" and finding that compared to his previous movies, "there is no over-sentimentality in this one". inSing also gave it 4/5, praising how the performances of the film's veteran actors, Aileen Tan and Mark Lee, "keep the viewer engrossed, as well as help to lift the heavily plotted and sometimes meandering film". F*** magazine gave the film 3.5/5, surprised to find "a solid, well-assembled film in its own right, with a swashbuckling cast at the top of its game that shows up the Ah Boys...for the acting lightweights that they are".

SINdie noted how although "the inevitable family melodrama in Neo’s films may be [sic] tedious, but that doesn’t dissipate the warmth that drives this project... there is the sense that the people behind Long Long Time Ago are more than collaborators, but rather a collaborative community akin to a family". Whang Yee-Ling of 8 Days awarded it 3.5/5, praising the "strongly played" performances of Aileen Tan, Mark Lee and Wang Lei and calling the film "equal parts heartfelt and calculating in manipulating our lump-in-the-throat nostalgia. It's a winner, the Hokkien dialect especially a treat".

=== Box office ===
Long Long Time Ago was released on 4 February 2016 during the Chinese New Year. It topped the local box office in Singapore, grossing $1.65 million in six days, beating films like The Monkey King 2 and The Mermaid. The film managed to gross over $4.13 million at the Singapore box office. Its sequel, Long Long Time Ago 2 was released two month later on 31 March 2016, and grossed over $3.02 million. The total local box office of two films is over $7.1 million.

== Sequel ==
The second part of the film, Long Long Time Ago 2, was released on 31 March 2016. After this film and its sequel film, Director Jack Neo and producers have planned for four instalments for this film series, but production of parts 3 and 4 depends on the box office results of the first two films. Neo states he still has many more stories from 1978 to 2016 to explore. And after he explored, he eventually made parts 3 and 4 known as The Diam Diam Era and The Diam Diam Era Two.
