= Serangoon Junior College =

- 实龙岗初级学院; Maktab Rendah Serangoon

Location
- 1033 Upper Serangoon Road; 534768; Singapore

Information
- Type: Government-aided; Co-educational
- Motto: Discere Servire (To Learn, To Serve)
- Established: March 1988; 38 years ago
- Status: Merged with Anderson Junior College in 2019
- Closed: January 2019; 7 years ago
- Session: Single-session
- School code: 1269
- Principal: Mr. Manogaran Suppiah
- Houses: Draco Pegasus Orion Cetus Aquila
- Color
- Website: srjc.moe.edu.sg

Serangoon Junior College (SRJC, Chinese: 实龙岗初级学院) was a junior college in Singapore, offering a 2-year course for pre-university students leading up to GCE 'A' Level examinations. Founded in March 1988, it was the fourteenth junior college to be established in Singapore.

== History ==
Serangoon Junior College was established in March 1988 as the fourteenth junior college in Singapore. The college initially operated from a temporary campus in Hougang, which is now the premises of Xinmin Secondary School, with a pioneering staff strength of 45 teachers. Lessons for the first batch of 673 students commenced in April of the same year. In December 1990, the college relocated to its present campus along Upper Serangoon Road, in Hougang New Town. It was officially declared open on 29 May 1992 by Mr. Lee Yock Suan, the then Minister for Education.

In recent years, the academic standards of Serangoon Junior College had been improving consistently, as it gained recognition as one of the leading government colleges in the district. This was complemented with the rise in admission standards of the college, from a cut-off point of 20 in the 1989 intake to 11 in the 2016 intake at the annual Joint Admission Exercise (JAE).

On 20 April 2017, it was announced that Serangoon Junior College would merge with Anderson Junior College (AJC), with the merged school located at the current site of Anderson Junior College, and operating under the name of Anderson Serangoon Junior College. This was in view of the declining enrollment into junior colleges since 2014, attributed to the fall in Singapore's birth rate. As a result of the merger, Serangoon Junior College no longer admit students from 2018 to minimise the need for students to physically relocate to the new site. The merger process is to be completed by January 2019.

To mark the closure of the college, a decommissioning ceremony was conducted on 7 December 2018. The college flag was lowered by its first Student of the Year from the pioneer class of 1989 - Tan Aik Fong.

== Principal ==
Name	Period Served
Thomas Tan	1988-1996
Jenny Yong	1996-2002
Kok Chwee Kee	2002-2006
Tan Teck Hock	2006-2010
Wong-Cheang Mei Heng	2010-2014
Manogaran Suppiah	2014-2018

== School Identity and Culture ==
=== Houses in SRJC ===
For competitive intra-school events, the student body is divided into five houses. Each house is led by House Captain(s) nominated from the Student Council.

The five houses are:

- Aquila (Yellow Eagle)
- Cetus (Purple Hydra/Sea Monster)
- Draco (Red Dragon)
- Orion (Blue Warrior)
- Pegasus (Green Horse/Pegasus)

== Academic information ==
Serangoon Junior College offered a two-year pre-university course leading to the Singapore-Cambridge GCE Advanced Level examinations, up to the 2017 intake.

The course offered in SRJC consisted of H1 General Paper, H1 Mother Tongue, H1 Project Work, together with four content-based subjects (3H2+1H1 or four H2 subjects). Students with a flair in an area were offered subjects at H3 level after the end of JC1 promotional exams, even though students taking those subjects need to travel to other places (usually universities) to take those subjects.

In line with the new 'A' Level syllabus stipulated by MOE, students are also required to take a contrasting subject that is outside their area of studies. The contrasting subject may be offered at either the H1 and H2 levels.

Subjects that were offered by SRJC is listed below:

Compulsory Subjects (H1):

- H1 Project Work
- H1 General Paper

Arts/ Humanities/ Languages (H1):

- H1 Literature in English
- H1 Tamil Language
- H1 Chinese Language
- H1 Malay Language
- H1 Economics
- H1 Geography
- H1 History

Sciences (H1):

- H1 Mathematics
- H1 Physics
- H1 Biology
- H1 Chemistry

Arts/Humanities/Languages (H2):

- H2 Art
- H2 Economics
- H2 Geography
- H2 History
- H2 Literature in English
- H2 Chinese Language and Literature
- H2 Malay Language and Literature
- H2 Tamil Language and Literature

Sciences (H2):

- H2 Mathematics
- H2 Further Mathematics (starting 2016)
- H2 Biology
- H2 Chemistry
- H2 Physics

=== SR Global Classroom Experience ===
SR Global Classroom Experience (SR-GCE) takes students’ learning beyond the shores of Singapore. With a service learning component designed into the programme, students are given opportunities to apply service learning within a larger community, while gaining cultural awareness and a global perspective. Destinations include Hong Kong, Java, Taiwan, Melbourne and Lijiang and vary depending on availability and safety.

Since 2007, SRJC has established a twinning programme with Sacred Heart Canossian College in Hong Kong.

== Co-curricular activities ==
Serangoon Junior College encourages participation in co-curricular activities for the all-round development of the individual. Students can opt to enrol in CCAs from the different categories as listed below.

Clubs and Societies

- AVA Club
- Community Champions Council (CCC)
- Red Cross Youth Chapter
- Library Council
- Outdoor Activities Club (ODAC)
- Photography Society
- Pilates
- Society for the Scientific Training And Research (S*STAR) (disbanded)
- SR Debates (disbanded)
- SR Drama
- Student Council

Performing Arts Groups

- Guitar Ensemble
- Guzheng Ensemble
- Dance
- SRJC Chorale
- Symphonic Band
- Glee Club (disbanded)

Sports

- Basketball
- Canoeing
- Runners' Club
- Netball
- Rockclimbing (ROCMOC)
- Football (Boys)
- Football (Girls)
- Taekwondo
- Tennis
- Touch Football (Girls)
- Track and Field
- Ultimate Frisbee
- Volleyball
- Skydiving (disbanded)

== Community outreach ==
=== WILL Run ===
The WILL Run is an annual fundraising event founded in 2008 that is integral in SR's pursuit of perseverance and selflessness. The term WILL evokes the willingness of an individual to run at least 10 km to raise funds for the community and for the college building. The minimum annual total distance targeted for completion is set at 20,014 km – the distance from the North to South Pole.

=== Get REAL@SRJC ===
Get REAL@SRJC, the service learning framework in SRJC, stands for Reaching out to the Environment, the Aged, and the Less fortunate. The strong emphasis in service learning is aligned to the college motto “To Learn, To Serve”.

=== Annual Fundraising ===
The annual college fundraising event focuses on giving back to the community. Since 2008, the college has committed the first $50,000 of the donations collection to an identified beneficiary each year. The rest of the collection is channelled towards college improvements. The former annual event also incorporated the SR Friendship Games, which was an annual sports event participated actively by the staff and the student body.

== Notable alumni ==
- Ezann Lee: Actress and host
- Paige Chua: Actress
- Ya Hui: Actress
- Roy Ngerng: Singaporean activist and blogger.

== See also ==
- Education in Singapore
- 4 Merged JCs To Bid Campuses Goodbye, 1.5 Years After MOE’s Shocking Decision
