= Police & Thief =

2004–2010 Singaporean TV series

- Genre: Sitcom
- Created by: Ong Meng; Ng Say Yong; Ngin Chiang Meng
- Starring: Suhaimi Yusof; Mark Lee; Margaret Lee; Sharon Wong; Glenn Wong; Ang Ching Hui; Era Farida; Mohd Hafiz; Noriff Danial Ashriq
- Country of origin: Singapore
- No. of seasons: 6
- No. of episodes: 81

Production
- Executive producer: Ong Meng
- Producer: Ong Meng
- Running time: 30 minutes (with commercials)

Original release
- Network: MediaCorp Channel 5
- Release: February 3, 2004 – May 25, 2010

Police & Thief (also spelled as Police and Thief) is a Singaporean sitcom that aired on MediaCorp Channel 5 from 2004 to 2010. It was also the third and final locally produced English sitcom after Under One Roof and Phua Chu Kang Pte Ltd. This sitcom was also similar in concept with the Chinese sitcom known as Family Combo (门当户对), where both neighbours who are fathers couldn't get along well and are always quarrelling with each other, being Moses Lim and Johnny Ng respectively, and coincidentally, Glenn Wong was also involved in this Chinese sitcom either. Besides, Family Combo was also Moses Lim's second Chinese sitcom after he previously starred as the main protagonist Tan Ah Teck in the popular and award-winning first locally produced English sitcom Under One Roof. Moreover, this sitcom also bears some similarities with another Singaporean sitcom known as ABC DJ, in which both families in that sitcom and this sitcom lived in a Toa Payoh HDB Flat. Furthermore, the comedy duo, being Suhaimi Yusof and Mark Lee, would later collaborate again and starred alongside together in Jack Neo movies Long Long Time Ago, Long Long Time Ago 2, The Diam Diam Era and The Diam Diam Era Two.

== Plot ==
Sgt Dollah Abu Bakar is a single-father and police officer whose neighbour Lee Tok Kong is a former gangster and currently a barber and hairstylist of his owned beauty salon. Both neighbours and their families live beside each other at a Toa Payoh HDB Flat located at Blk 233, Toa Payoh Lorong 8. Besides, the both of them have been living together side by side for many years and could also be good friends towards each other if they don't quarrel, just like their children whom are also good friends as well. When Sgt Dollah remarries Haslindah in Season 4, she also became good friends with Tok Kong's wife named Lily Lee as well. This suggests that both family neighbours could really get along well when there isn't any misunderstandings. The sitcom had its 6th and final season aired in March 2010.

== Cast ==
- Suhaimi Yusof as Sgt Dollah Abu Bakar
- Mark Lee as Lee Tok Kong
- Margaret Lee (Seasons 1–5) as Mrs Lily Lee
  - Sharon Wong (Season 6)
- Glenn Wong as Lee Xiao Long
- Ang Ching Hui as Lee Xiao Yun
- Era Farida (Seasons 3–6) as Haslindah
- Mohd Hafiz as Rudy
- Noriff Danial Ashriq as Rafi
