= 8days =

Singaporean online magazine

- Former actor James Lye on 8 DAYS, Issue 486 (29 Jan – 8 February 2000)
- Chief Editor: Lau Kuan Wei
- Categories: Asian & Hollywood, Celebrity, Entertainment, Television, TV listings
- Frequency: Weekly
- First issue: 13 October 1990
- Final issue: 27 September 2018
- Company: Mediacorp
- Country: Singapore
- Language: English
- Website: www.8days.sg
- ISSN: 0129-3036
- OCLC: 226123753

8 Days (stylized as 8days) is a Singaporean online magazine published by Mediacorp. Published in print weekly from 1990 to 2018, it covers a wide range of topics including entertainment, food, fashion, beauty, travel and lifestyle. The magazine is known for its tongue-in-cheek humour and its coverage of the Singapore entertainment scene, and also features regional and international entertainment stories and celebrity features, such as interviews with Hollywood, Hong Kong, Taiwanese and Korean celebrities.

There is usually a main feature story, which often has an interview with a celeb and photos. The main sections of the magazine include “See & Do”, which has celebrity news and gossip, “Movies”, which contains reviews and film features, and “Eat & Drink”, a large food section with reviews, new openings and recipes. Other sections include “Lifestyle”, “Travel”, "Home Matters “The Feelgood Page”, “What They Never Taught You In School” and “Shirtless Guy Of The Week.”

The stars who have been featured on the covers of the magazine range from Singaporean artistes such as Zoe Tay, Rebecca Lim, Joanne Peh, Elvin Ng and Tay Ping Hui, and Singapore personalities like Joseph Schooling, to regional and Hollywood stars such as Angelina Jolie, Scarlett Johansson, Ryan Gosling and Johnny Depp.

== History ==
8days is one of Singapore's longest-running magazines, in print for more than 28 years as of 2018.

The magazine started out as an A4-sized publication, but was changed to become a B4-sized one instead in 2008. On 13 December 2009, the 1000th issue of 8days was launched at Iluma. There was also an exhibit of the 999 different covers.

A television version started on Channel 5 on 3 April 2001.

In 2013 and 2016, the magazine was named Magazine of the Year in a poll by trade journal, Marketing magazine. The publication was also named Entertainment and Lifestyle Magazine of the Year in 2013 for the second year running.

Since September 2018, 8days ceased its print editions and moved to become digital-only.
