= List of Singaporean films =

This is a list of Singaporean films of feature length (defined here as above 45 minutes), including foreign films that involved collaborations or co-productions with Singaporean filmmakers or artists, marked accordingly in the list as follows:

== Before 1990 ==
- List of Singaporean films before 1990

== 1990s ==
- List of Singaporean films of the 1990s

== 2000s ==
- List of Singaporean films of 2000
- List of Singaporean films of 2001
- List of Singaporean films of 2002
- List of Singaporean films of 2003
- List of Singaporean films of 2004
- List of Singaporean films of 2005
- List of Singaporean films of 2006
- List of Singaporean films of 2007
- List of Singaporean films of 2008
- List of Singaporean films of 2009

== 2010s ==
- List of Singaporean films of 2010
- List of Singaporean films of 2011
- List of Singaporean films of 2012
- List of Singaporean films of 2013
- List of Singaporean films of 2014
- List of Singaporean films of 2015
- List of Singaporean films of 2016
- List of Singaporean films of 2017
- List of Singaporean films of 2018
- List of Singaporean films of 2019

== 2020s ==
- List of Singaporean films of 2020
- List of Singaporean films of 2021
- List of Singaporean films of 2022
- List of Singaporean films of 2023
- List of Singaporean films of 2024
- List of Singaporean films of 2025
- List of Singaporean films of 2026

== See also ==
- List of movies set in Singapore
- Cinema of Singapore
