= List of Singaporean films of the 2000s =

A list of films produced or co-produced in Singapore ordered by year in the 2000s. For a complete list of Singaporean films, see Category:Singaporean films

- List of Singaporean films of 2000
- List of Singaporean films of 2001
- List of Singaporean films of 2002
- List of Singaporean films of 2003
- List of Singaporean films of 2004
- List of Singaporean films of 2005
- List of Singaporean films of 2006
- List of Singaporean films of 2007
- List of Singaporean films of 2008
- List of Singaporean films of 2009

== See also ==
- Lists of Singaporean films
