= List of Singaporean films of the 2010s =

A list of films produced or co-produced in Singapore ordered by year in the 2010s. For a complete list of Singaporean films, see Category:Singaporean films

- List of Singaporean films of 2010
- List of Singaporean films of 2011
- List of Singaporean films of 2012
- List of Singaporean films of 2013
- List of Singaporean films of 2014
- List of Singaporean films of 2015
- List of Singaporean films of 2016
- List of Singaporean films of 2017
- List of Singaporean films of 2018
- List of Singaporean films of 2019

== See also ==
- List of Singaporean films
