= List of Singaporean films of the 2020s =

A list of films produced or co-produced in Singapore ordered by year in the 2020s. For a complete list of Singaporean films, see Category:Singaporean films

- List of Singaporean films of 2020
- List of Singaporean films of 2021
- List of Singaporean films of 2022
- List of Singaporean films of 2023
- List of Singaporean films of 2024
- List of Singaporean films of 2025
- List of Singaporean films of 2026

== See also ==
- Lists of Singaporean films
