= List of Magkaribal characters =

This article contains cast and character information for the ABS-CBN Filipino drama television series Magkaribal.

== Main characters ==
- Bea Alonzo as Angela "Gelai" Agustin / Angela Abella – Angela is Anna’s younger sister. She loves designing since she was a kid; a passion that she shares with her sister. When she was kidnapped, she met a boy named Dos, later on known as Louie Villamor. She was found and adopted by a couple from Divisoria: Hermes Agustin, and his wife Sonia, a seamstress who recently lost a child. With a humble beginnings as a seamstress, she is currently a budding designer with dreams of becoming a top designer. Hand-in-hand with her desire to be a top designer, Gelai is also determined to find her older sister, Anna. Barbie Sabino plays the younger counterpart.
- Gretchen Barretto as Anna Abella / Victoria Valera – Anna is Angela's driven older sister who became a successful international model and designer. After losing her mother at the age of 15, from a fight with Vera, she worked as a prostitute in order for her and younger sister, Angela, to survive. However, she was separated from her younger sister, Angela, who she believed had died in a hospital fire. She was later found and adopted by a wealthy man named Ronaldo Valera and is renamed Victoria Valera. She wants revenge on Vera for contributing to her mother, and presumably, her sister's death. She has a complicated yet meaningless relationship with Louie. Kathryn Bernardo plays the younger counterpart.
- Angel Aquino as Vera Cruz-Abella – Chloe's adoptive mother, and the source of Anna and Angela’s resentment. As a young international model, she fell in love and had a relationship with Manuel Abella while in Italy. She blames Anna for her miscarriage, which resulted in her to be unable to have children of her own again. Years later, she becomes a designer determined to maintain her status as the “Queen of Philippine Fashion.” Vera then becomes sinister and angry at Victoria Valera, whom she sees as a threat to her reputation in the fashion industry. Alessandra De Rossi plays the younger counterpart.
- Derek Ramsay as Louie “Dos / Markado” Villamor – He was the boy who Gelai befriended and helped her escape from their kidnappers. As an adult, he became Carolina's so-called boyfriend. He also has a secret and complicated relationship with Victoria. He was strong and tough as a kid and as an adult he became Markado, a Mixed Martial Arts fighter and model. He will later find himself torn between Victoria and Gelai. He dies after helping Victoria discover the mystery that Gelai is her long lost sister Angela. Nash Aguas plays the younger counterpart.
- Erich Gonzales as Chloe C. Abella – Vera and Manuel's adopted daughter. Chloe seeks her mother, Vera's attention but has never felt loved. She eventually develops special feelings for Caloy.
- Enchong Dee as Carlo "Caloy" Javier – He is Gelai's supportive best friend but who is also in love with her. An unexpected turn of events will lead him to meet his perfect match, Chloe.

== Recurring characters ==
- Bianca Manalo as Gigi Fernando – Gelai and Caloy’s close friend who also lives in the Divisoria complex.
- Robert Arevalo as Ronaldo Valera – Victoria’s adoptive father. He owns "The House of Ronaldo" and is one of the wealthiest people in the Philippines. He changed Anna’s name to Victoria upon making the decision to adopt her. Ronaldo became the only loving father figure in Victoria’s life.
- Mark Gil as Manuel Abella – Anna and Angela’s biological father, and Chloe’s adoptive father. As a young poor man, he left his wife, Stella and daughters Anna and Angela to pursue work in Milan. While in Milan, has an affair with Vera Cruz, a young model and aspiring designer. Upon his return to the Philippines, he decides to live and raise a family with Vera and ultimately leaves his wife and children. Unsuccessful at conceiving a child, Vera and Manuel adopt a daughter, Chloe, whom Manuel dotes on and Vera ignores. He dies after falling from the roof to save Gelai.
- John Arcilla as Hermes Agustin – Gelai's adoptive father. He and his wife, Sonia, find the young and orphaned Gelai and decided to adopt her. He raised Gelai and loves and treats her as his own child.
- Arlene Muhlach as Sonia Agustin – A seamstress, Hermes' wife, and Gelai's adoptive mother. She resents Gelai at first after having lost her own daughter previously, but eventually grows to love her as her own.
- Beatriz Saw as Kate – Chloe's constant companion at the beginning of the series, and also works for Vera Cruz.
- Nina Ricci Alagao as Donna – a fashion designer and businesswoman who works for Vera Cruz.
- Irma Adlawan as Carolina – She was Vera's loyal customer but is now Victoria's. Carolina is a notorious flirt and used to have a relationship with Louie.
- R.S. Francisco as Gian Franco – He is a senior fashion designer at Vera's Couture. He is Vera's right-hand man and is set to make Gelai's stay at the fashion house miserable.
- Toffee Calma as John Paul - Gian Franco's assistant at Vera Couture.
- Lyka Ugarte as Betsy – Victoria's nanny who stays with her and Ronaldo at their home.
- Levi Ignacio as Oca – Louie's coach at the URCC, who also serves as an advising father figure in his life.
- Rodjun Cruz as Calvin – Caloy's friend who is also a fighter that trains at URCC.

== Guest cast ==
- Dimples Romana as Stella Abella
- Alessandra de Rossi as young Vera
- Kathryn Bernardo as Young Anna/Victoria
- Nash Aguas as young Louie/Dos
- Barbie Sabino as young Angela/Gelai
- James Blanco as young Manuel
- Allan Paule as young Ronaldo
- Maricar de Mesa as young Betsy
- Racquel Montessa as Mila Fernando
- Edward Mendez as Mark Laurel
- Christian Vasquez as Paul
- Irma Adlawan as Carolina
- RJ Ledesma as Christian Ocampo
- Will Devaughn as Nick
- Marc Abaya as Neil Olaguer
- Pinky Amador as Carmen Sotto
- Lorenzo Mara as Salvador
- Princess Manzon as Romina
- Bettina Carlos as Liz
- Josef Elizalde as Tommy
- Mia Pratts as Ruth
- Ian Galliguez as Cora
- Savannah Lamsen as Chloe
- Eric Waldie as Alexander Jacobs
- Karla Henry as Nicole Santos
- Phoemela Baranda as Reporter
- Marie Lozano as Reporter
- Cheska Litton as Reporter
- Manny Castañeda as Ronaldo's Friend
- Cheska Iñigo as Vera's Friend
- Ana Feleo as Doctor

== Top fashion designers ==
- Frederick Alba
- Frederick Peralta
- Rene Salud
- Nat Manilag
- Eric Delos Santos
- Gerry Sunga
- Ulysses King
- Ann Ong
- Gilda Salonga
- Lorna Naval
- Melissa Soriano
- Puey Quiñones
- Roland Lirio
- Noel Crisostomo
- Noli Gayanoche
