= List of Singaporean films of 2008 =

This is a list of films produced in Singapore ordered by release in 2008.

Date	Title	Director	Producer	Production Cost	Singapore Gross	Ref.
2008	Missing You...	Lin Kun Hui	InnoForm Media			
January 2008	Lucky7	Sun Koh, Rajagopal, Boo Junfeng, Brian Gothong Tan, Chew Tze Chuan, Ho Tzu Nyen and Tania Sng	Lucky 7 Film Company			
17 January 2008	The Olive Depression	Joshua Lim				
7 February 2008	Ah Long Pte Ltd	Jack Neo	Double Vision/Raintree Pictures/Scorpio East Pictures	$1.2 million	$3,173,460.00	
29 February 2008	The Leap Years	Jean Yeo	Raintree Pictures/Golden Village	$3 million	$1,001,362.50	
13 March 2008	Rule No. 1	Kelvin Tong	MediaCorp Raintree Pictures, Scorpio East and Boku Films (Singapore), Fortune Star and DME (HK)		$1,056,766.50	
20 March 2008	Slam	Jonathan Lim	Jonathan Lim		$47,602.50	
5 April 2008	Road to Mecca	Harman Hussin				
5 April 2008	Women Who Love Women: Conversations in Singapore	Lim Mayling				
6 April 2008	Homeless FC	James Leong, Lynn Lee	Lianain Films, supported by Singapore Film Commission			
6 April 2008	Hashi	Sherman Ong	Paddy Pictures			
6 April 2008	Dreams from the Third World	Kan Lume				
7 April 2008	Veil of Dreams	Zaihirat Banu Codelli	Oak3 Films, Media Plant			
7 April 2008	Dirt Out	Yousry Mansour				
8 April 2008	Diminishing Memories II	Eng Yee Peng	Supported by Singapore Film Commission			
10 April 2008	To Speak	Craig Ower	Lionel Chok			
10 April 2008	Keronchong for Pak Bakar	Abdul Nizam Hamid				
May 2008	Dance of the Dragon	Max Mannix and John Radel	Silkroad Pictures		$222,198.00	
23 May 2008	My Magic	Eric Khoo	Zhao Wei Films	$200,000	$29,911.50	
11 June 2008	Salawati	Marc X Grigoroff	Marc X Grigoroff		$3,438.32	
July 2008	The Spirit Compendium	Foo Fung Koon				
31 July 2008	Money No Enough 2	Jack Neo	Neo Studios, MediaCorp Raintree Pictures, Scorpio East Pictures		$5,084,563.50	
7 August 2008	Mad About English	Lian Pek	Journey Pictures, Media Development Authority		$181,086	
7 August 2008	A Month of Hungry Ghosts	Tony Kern	Genevieve Woo, Tony Kern		$65,029.50	
14 August 2008	12 Lotus	Royston Tan	MediaCorp Raintree Pictures, 10twentyeight & Infinite Frameworks (Singapore)	$1.5 million	$1,027,129.50	
21 August 2008	Kallang Roar the Movie	Cheng Ding An	Merelion Pictures	$1 million	$93,159	
September 2008	Invisible Children	Brian Gothong Tan	Zhao Wei Films			
September 2008	Painted Skin	Gordon Chan	MediaCorp Raintree Pictures, Ningxia Film Studio, Beijing Century Jiaying Central Development, Beijing Ding Long Da Media, Shanghai Film Group Corporation and Golden Sun Films Distribution Ltd, Salon Films	$19 million	$1,538,058.00	
11 September 2008	The Days (岁月)	Boi Kwong	Originasian Pictures & Company X		$190,000	
October 2008	The Coffin	Ekachai Uekrongtham	Cathay-Keris Films, Mediacorp Raintree Pictures, Viva Entertainment, Scorpio East Pictures Pte Ltd		$1,262,216.82	
30 October 2008	Sing to the Dawn	Philip Mitchell	MediaCorp Raintree Pictures & Infinite Frameworks, Media Development Authority	$2.5 million	$270,259.50	
November 2008	The Carrot Cake Conversations	Michael Wang	The Vintage Film Co	$350,000	$23,711.21	
November 2008	Pulau Hantu	Esan Sivalingam				
