= List of Singaporean films of 2023 =

This is a list of films produced in Singapore ordered by release in 2022.

Date	Title	Director	Producer	Production Cost	Singapore Gross	Ref.
5 January 2023	Circle Line	JD Chua	Taipan Films, mm2 Entertainment	$3 million	$27,723.84	
14 January 2023	Class Acts	Deon Phua, Tan Hwee En	Stacking Stones, Amok TV, No Average Joe			
19 January 2023	What! The Heist	Matt Lai	Asia Tropical Films, The Film Engine, King Kong Media Production		$464,000	
21 January 2023	The King of Musang King	Jack Neo	J Team, mm2 Entertainment		$1.85 million	
21 January 2023	In My Mother's Skin	Kenneth Dagatan	Epicmedia, Zhao Wei Films, Volos Films, Clover Films			
18 February 2023	Tomorrow Is a Long Time	Jow Zhi Wei	Akanga Film Asia, Potocol, Volos Films, La Fabrica Nocturna, Oublaum Filmes			
16 March 2023	Motel Melati	Mike Wiluan, Billy Christian	Infinite Studios		$12,599.07	
28 April 2023	Seven Days	Grace Wu	Tigon Pictures, Mocha Chai Laboratories		$44,462.04	
17 May 2023	Tiger Stripes	Amanda Nell Eu	Ghost Grrrl Pictures, Flash Forward Entertainment, Akanga Film Asia, Still Moving, Weydemann Bros., PRPL, KawanKawan Media	€1.1 million		
21 May 2023	The Breaking Ice	Anthony Chen	Canopy Pictures, Giraffe Pictures, Huace Pictures		$46,122.22	
24 May 2023	Inside the Yellow Cocoon Shell	Pham Thien An	JK Film, Potocol, Deuxième Ligne Films, Zorba Production, Fasten Films			
26 July 2023	Missing: The Lucie Blackman Case	Hyoe Yamamoto	Vesuvius Pictures, Beach House Pictures			
28 July 2023	Don't Go Home Tonight	Kelvin Sng	KSP Production			
5 August 2023	Dreaming & Dying	Nelson Yeo	Momo Film Co, Kawankawan Media			
6 August 2023	Essential Truths of the Lake	Lav Diaz	Epicmedia, Sine Olivia Pilipinas, Films Boutique, Rosa Filmes, Tier Pictures, Volos Films Italia, Bord Cadre films, Sovereign Films			
4 September 2023	Snow in Midsummer	Chong Keat Aun	SunStrong Entertainment, August Pictures, Janji Pictures, Swallow Wings Films, Southern Islet Pictures	RM3 million		
9 September 2023	Andragogy	Wregas Bhanuteja	Rekata Studio, Kaninga Pictures, Momo Film Co., KG Media, Masih Belajar, Hwallywood Studio			
15 September 2023	My Heavenly City (我的天堂城市)	Sen-I Yu	Rumble Pictures, mm2 Entertainment			
23 September 2023	Twenty20	Wong Kwang Han	2020 Productions			
24 September 2023	Last Shadow at First Light	Nicole Midori Woodford	Potocol, Fourier Films, Studio Virc, Happy Infinite Productions			
28 September 2023	Ice Cold: Murder, Coffee and Jessica Wongso	Rob Sixsmith	Beach House Pictures			
7 October 2023	Oasis of Now	Chia Chee Sum	theCommonist, Afternoon Pictures, Akanga Film Asia, La Fabrica Nocturna Cinéma	US$485,000		
8 October 2023	Republic (我们的共和国)	Jin Jiang	Levo Films			
19 October 2023	Confinement	Kelvin Tong	Clover Films, Boku Films	$1.5 million	$172,799.07	
24 October 2023	La Luna	M. Raihan Halim	Clover Films, Papahan Films, Act 2 Pictures	$1.1 million	$30,111.11	
8 November 2023	Wonderland	Chai Yee Wei	Mocha Chai Laboratories, MM2 Entertainment Singapore		$480,000	
17 November 2023	Heavens: The Boy and His Robot	Rich Ho	Heavens Entertainment			
2 December 2023	A Year of No Significance (大风吹)	Kelvin Tong	Boku Films		$18,264.11	
6 December 2023	My Endless Numbered Days (まだまだ)	Shaun Neo				
6 December 2023	Sunday	Sean Ng	Amok			
