= List of Singaporean films of 2014 =

This is a list of films produced in Singapore ordered by release in 2014.

Date	Title	Director	Producer	Production Cost	Singapore Gross	Ref.
30 January 2014	The Lion Men	Jack Neo	Leonard Lai, Jack Neo, "Mang" (Melvin Ang)	$2 million	$4.1 million	
2 February 2014	Gone Case	Ler Jiyuan	Lee Thean-Jeen			
27 February 2014	Resolve (决议案)	Randy Ang	Red Action Entertainment, JF Lennon & Associates, Bettermen Asia	$1.2 million	$35,000	
13 March 2014	The Second Coming	Herman Yao, Tin Chi Ng	Scout Pictures		$96,111	
8 May 2014	Filial Party (我是孝子)	Boris Boo	Clover Films		$731,118	
12 June 2014	The Lion Men: Ultimate Showdown	Jack Neo	Leonard Lai, Jack Neo, "Mang" (Melvin Ang)	$2 million	$2 million	
19 June 2014	Meeting the Giant	Tay Ping Hui	Stellar Mega Film, Clover Films, G & J Creation, Aquila, StarHub		$143,649	
5 July 2014	Siam-Burma Death Railway	Kurinji Vendan	Jai Studio, Nadodigal Creations	$55,000		
19 July 2014	Camera	James Leong	Lianain Films, Fortissimo Films			
4 September 2014	Unlucky Plaza	Ken Kwek	Kaya Toast Pictures	$800,000	$64,580	
11 September 2014	Afterimages	Tony Kern	Tony Kern, Genevieve Woo		$112,584	
October 2014	Fluid Boundaries	Jeonghyun Mun, Daniel Rudi Haryanto, Vladimir Todorovic	PURN Production			
3 October 2014	03-Flats	Lei Yuan Bin	Lilian Chee			
4 October 2014	Southeast Asian Cinema: When the Rooster Crows	Leonardo Cinieri Lombroso	Blue Film, M'GO Films			
18 October 2014	Snakeskin	Daniel Hui	13 Little Pictures			
23 October 2014	Nightmare on Armenian Street / Hell on Earth	Wesley Leon Aroozoo, Koh Chong Wu, Nelson Yeo, Kopi Bing, Koo Chia Meng, JD Chua, Linh Duong, Syazali Bin Mohd Fazal, Teo Wei Yong, Russel Morton, Fade To Salon, Yeo Siew Hua, Dzafirul Haniff, Ghazi Alqudcy, Ila, Mads K. Baekkewold, Thong Kay Wee, Allysa Sing	Nelson Yeo, Chris Yeo and The Substation			
27 October 2014	As You Were	Liao Jiekai	13 Little Pictures			
31 October 2014	Banting	M. Raihan Halim	Papahan Films	$700,000	$26,130	
11 November 2014	Little People Big Dreams	Mak Chun Kit	Mak Chun Kit, Cindy Zeng			
11 November 2014	A Fantastic Ghost Wedding	Meng Ong	Scout Pictures		$291,711	
13 November 2014	Wayang Boy (戏曲小子)	Raymond Tan	MM2 Entertainment Pte Ltd, Brainchild Pictures Pte Ltd, The Number 8 Yard, Cornerstone Pictures, Bert Pictures, StarHub Cable Vision Limited and Zingshot Productions	$1 million	$135,000	
4 December 2014	The Naked DJ	Kan Lume	Chapter Free Productions			
6 December 2014	The Obs: A Singapore Story	Yeo Siew Hua	Yeo Siew Hua, Adeline Setiawan, Dan Koh	$33,330		
6 December 2014	Miss J Contemplates Her Choice (石头剪刀布)	Jason Lai	Lim Suat Yen			
7 December 2014	Standing in Still Water	Ric Aw	Joanna Ying Ng			
8 December 2014	Singapore Girl	Kan Lume	Kan Lume			
10 December 2014	Breaking the Ice	A Nizam Khan	A Nizam Khan			
12 December 2014	Rubbers	Han Yew Kwang	Lau Chee Nien		$110,000	
13 December 2014	Lang Tong	Sam Loh	Outsider Pictures			
