= List of Singaporean films of 2017 =

This is a list of films produced in Singapore ordered by release in 2017.

| Date | Title | Director | Producer | Production Cost | Singapore Gross | Ref. |
|---|---|---|---|---|---|---|
| 19 January 2017 | Pop Aye | Kirsten Tan | Giraffe Pictures/E&W Films | | $96,348 | |
| 26 January 2017 | The Fortune Handbook | Kelvin Sng | mm2 Entertainment | $1.3 million | $1 million | |
| 26 January 2017 | Take 2 | Ivan Ho | mm2 Entertainment | $1.2 million | $1.5 million | |
| 24 February 2017 | Chennai2Singapore | Abbas Akbar | Comicbook | | $9,000 | |
| 30 March 2017 | Goodbye Mr. Loser (令伯特烦恼) | Adrian Teh | Asia Tropical Films/mm2 Entertainment | $853,000 | | |
| 20 April 2017 | In Time To Come (终有一天) | Tan Pin Pin | | | $14,500 | |
| 18 May 2017 | Lucky Boy | Boris Boo | Clover Films/mm2 Entertainment | $2.5 million | $451,868 | |
| 25 May 2017 | 667 | Eva Tang, He Shuming, Kirsten Tan, Liao Jiekai, and Jun Chong | Chuan Pictures/Singapore Chinese Cultural Centre | | | |
| 17 June 2017 | Outsiders | Sam Loh | | | | |
| 28 June 2017 | Chaplin in Bali | Raphaël Millet | Nocturnes Productions, Man's Film Productions, Phish Communications | | | |
| 8 July 2017 | Joe: The Black Assassin | T. Suriavelan | 360 Entertainment/Satesh Kumaran Productions/Vikadakavi Productions | | | |
| 1 August 2017 | TimeScapes (时间风景) | Ervin Han | Robot Playground Media/StarHub Cable Vision | | | |
| 3 August 2017 | Wonder Boy | Dick Lee, Daniel Yam | mm2 Entertainment/Bert Pictures | $1.3 million | $76,611 | |
| 9 August 2017 | The Song of Scorpions | Anup Singh | Feather Light Films/KNM/Ciné-Sud Promotion/Aurora Media/M Capital | | | |
| 15 August 2017 | Once Upon A Generation (兰蕙百年) | Huang Junxiang | Zhao Wei Films/Nanyang School Alumni Association | | | |
| 23 September 2017 | Damascus Cover | Daniel Zelik Berk | Xeitgeist Entertainment Group/Marcys Holdings/BBM | | | |
| 14 October 2017 | I Want to Go Home | Wesley Leon Aroozoo | 13 Little Pictures | | | |
| 9 November 2017 | Jimami Tofu | Jason Chan, Christian Lee | BananaMana Films | | | |
| 9 November 2017 | Ah Boys to Men 4 | Jack Neo | J Team, mm2 Entertainment | $5 million | $5 million | |
| 28 November 2017 | Diamond Dogs (钻石狗) | Gavin Lim | Void Deck Films | | | |
| 9 December 2017 | Dreaming in Black and White (幻境黑白) | Lei Yuan Bin | activated C Studio | | | |
