= We Can Save the World!!! =

2025 film by Cheng Chai Hong

- Directed by: Cheng Chai Hong
- Written by: Cheng Chai Hong
- Produced by: Cheng Chai Hong; Martin Loh; Tan Jia Min; Lee Yi Jia; Philothea Liau Hui Li
- Starring: Noah Yap; Jun Vinh Teo; Xuan Ong; Fauzi Azzhar; Daisy Irani Subaiah; Leslie Sim; Mark Kinoshita; Anthony Levi Kho
- Music by: Sulwyn Lok; Alexandra Funes; Sean Lim
- Distributed by: Anticipate Pictures
- Release date: 18 September 2025
- Running time: 110 minutes
- Country: Singapore
- Language: English

We Can Save The World!!! is a 2025 Singapore science fiction comedy film written and directed by Cheng Chai Hong and starring Noah Yap, Jun Vinh Teoh, Fauzi Azzhar, and Xuan Ong.

== Production ==
Singaporean independent filmmaker Cheng Chai Hong began writing the script for We Can Save The World!!! in 2023. The film was also Cheng's directorial debut.

The film's budget was not publicly disclosed, although it was described as "lean" and some of it had been raised during a 2023 crowdfunding campaign on Indiegogo.

Singaporean actor Noah Yap played the lead role of Ryan, "a disillusioned public servant who works at the local town council." Malaysian actor Teoh Jun Vinh was cast as Peng, "a homeless man claiming to be an alien stranded on Earth." The main cast also included Fauzi Azzhar, Xuan Ong, and Daisy Irani.

== Release ==
The film premiered at the New York Asian Film Festival on 17 July 2025. It was distributed by Singaporean film distributor Anticipate Pictures and initially scheduled for theatrical release in Singapore on 1 August 2025, at the independent cinema The Projector's Cathay Cineleisure Orchard premises. After both The Projector and Cathay Cineplexes suddenly ceased operations, the film's release date was pushed back to 18 September 2025.
