= Grace Wu =

Film director, screenwriter, & producer

- 吴可嘉
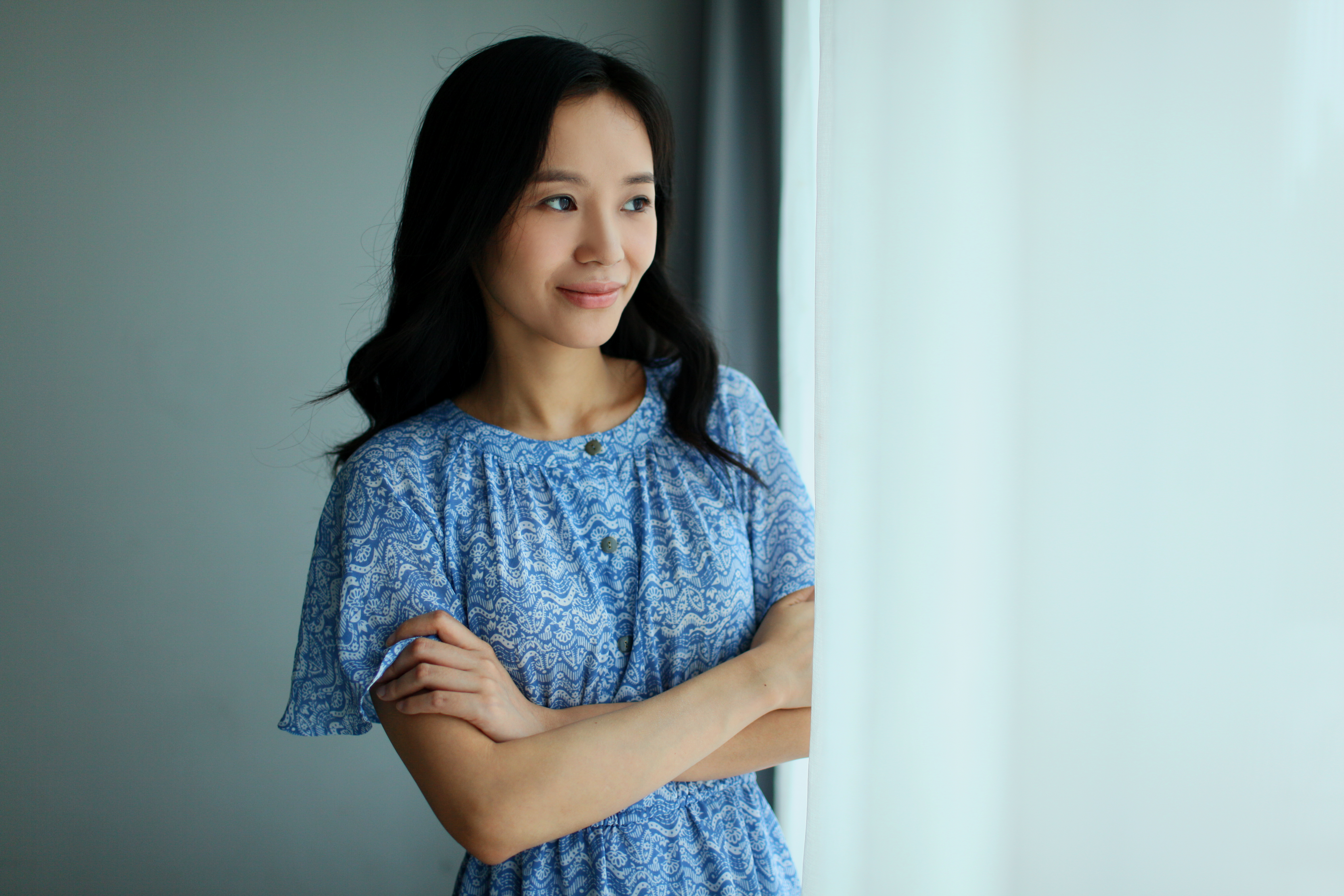
- Born: Chongqing, China
- Occupations: Film director, screenwriter, producer
- Years active: 2021–present

Grace Wu (Chinese: 吴可嘉) is a film director, screenwriter, and producer based in Singapore. She is known for her debut feature film Seven Days (2023), which premiered as the opening film at the 11th Singapore Chinese Film Festival. In 2023, She was selected for Fortune China's Most Powerful Women (MPW): Ones to Watch list.

== Early life and education ==
Wu was born in Chongqing, China. She graduated from Peking University and began her career in the IT industry. She later earned an MBA from INSEAD Business School. Wu studied filmmaking in Singapore and directed her first short film Salvation in 2021.

== Career ==
Wu has been active in the Singaporean film industry, contributing to both local and international productions. Her debut feature film Seven Days was noted for its narrative and visual style. It also became the first Singaporean film to feature its own NFT-based film art collection on the platform OpenSea.

In 2024, she served as executive producer for Orang Ikan, a co-production involving Singapore, Indonesia, Japan, and the United Kingdom. The film premiered in the Gala Selection of the 37th Tokyo International Film Festival and was later screened at the Trieste Science+Fiction Festival and the 35th Singapore International Film Festival.

Her latest feature film, The Sea, The Sky, was announced in 2025 as the first China–Singapore co-production to be filmed in Chongqing.

== Filmography ==
Year	Title	Role	Notes	Ref
2021	Salvation	Director, writer	Short film	
2023	Seven Days	Director, writer	Opening film, 11th Singapore Chinese Film Festival	
2024	Orang Ikan	Executive producer	Official selection, 37th Tokyo International Film Festival; 35th SGIFF	
