= News Tonight =

- Genre: Flagship News
- Starring: Genevieve Woo (Mainly weekdays); Glenda Chong (Formerly weekdays); Angela Lim (Mainly weekends); Clara Lee (interim main presenter on Weekends); Keith Liu; Otelli Edwards; Paul Sng; Poh Kok Ing; Jill Neubronner; Elakeyaa Selvaraji
- Country of origin: Singapore
- Original language: English

Production
- Production location: Mediacorp Campus 1 Stars Avenue Singapore 138507
- Camera setup: Multi-camera
- Running time: 30 minutes
- Production company: Mediacorp News

Original release
- Network: Channel 5
- Release: 15 February 1963 – present

Related
- Singapore Tonight

News Tonight (formerly News 5 Tonight, News 5, and prior to 1994 simply News) is a Singaporean English-language news programme broadcast on Mediacorp Channel 5. Since its inception, the programme has provided a round-up of the day's events in Singapore, along with coverage of breaking news and occasional international stories of relevance to Singaporean audiences.

The programme is currently presented mainly by Genevieve Woo on weekdays and Clara Lee on weekends. It airs at 9:00 pm daily and has been the sole news bulletin on Channel 5 since the launch of Channel NewsAsia.

== History ==
Channel 5 has aired news bulletins since its pilot broadcasts in February 1963. These consisted of a straightforward news bulletin read by a presenter, accompanied by Berita Singapura newsreels. The first newsreader on launch night was Steven Lee, while the first Berita Singapura newsreel was read by Harry Crabb, who later appeared in regular bulletins. The news division was assisted by Australian entrepreneur David Prior, who trained local journalists; at the time, he was expected to remain with Television Singapura for two years. The first pilot-service bulletin aired at 6:30 pm on 15 February 1963 and comprised a five-minute English bulletin followed by a five-minute newsreel with Chinese subtitles.

On 11 March 1963, ahead of the 2 April launch, the channel expanded to a four-hour schedule. The English bulletin moved to 9:15 pm and expanded to fifteen minutes, while a Chinese bulletin was added at 8:15 pm. Berita Singapura newsreels continued to air separately from the main bulletin.

From 30 March 1973, the channel carried news bulletins only in English and Malay, with the English bulletin moved to primetime. Selected newsreels were converted to colour on 11 November 1974 as part of RTS's colour-broadcast implementation plan. Black-and-white material continued to be aired as appropriate. By the end of 1978, "on-the-spot" outside broadcast links were introduced.

Following RTS's transition to SBC, all four language bulletins initially adopted a standardised news intro displaying their respective titles. Corporatisation also enabled SBC to hire permanent newsreaders. A new dress code was introduced on 1 May 1980, restricting certain colours and patterns due to technical issues such as chroma-key conflicts and ghosting effects. SBC also considered a S$200 clothing allowance following the implementation of these rules.

In August 1980, SBC began adopting a new format for its television news broadcasts. The format, initially applied to the English and Mandarin bulletins, featured two newscasters and expanded on-location reporting. The "archaic" newsreels were discontinued, beginning with the English bulletins. Outside broadcasts also saw improvements during this period.

On 1 February 1983, SBC introduced a redesigned studio set for its third anniversary, described as "duck-egg blue" and "three-dimensional", featuring a semi-circular table. The previous set had been pink. Newscasters began reading different stories, and the bulletins adopted more graphics and illustrations. SBC also announced late-night 15-minute bulletins for the forthcoming Channel 12 and moved Channel 5's main news to 8:45 pm. With the launch of Channel 12 on 1 February 1984, the News bulletin expanded to thirty minutes, and commercial breaks were introduced for the first time. Prior to this, only the pre-bulletin clock permitted advertisements, beginning 1 June 1980.

A new intro was launched in April 1988 using a computer graphics system installed the previous year. In August 1988, the bulletins adopted an "upbeat and viewer-friendly" design featuring the Singapore skyline as a backdrop, which received positive viewer feedback. In December 1988, SBC announced the discontinuation of Late News on SBC 5 and 12 due to limited news developments after the main 9 pm bulletin. Presenters also adopted a coordinated on-air wardrobe sponsored by various boutiques.

On 31 August 1992, SBC 5 introduced a two-minute weekday 7 pm bulletin, From the Newsroom, which did not replace the main 9 pm bulletin. Facing competition from Singapore Cable Vision's NewsVision, which offered international news sources, SBC announced plans for a second English bulletin beginning January 1994. As of October 1993, the 9 pm bulletin drew approximately 140,000 adult viewers.

Channel 5 became an all-English channel on 1 January 1994. Two bulletins were introduced: News 5 at Seven, aimed at blue-collar workers with a focus on human-interest stories, and News 5 Tonight, formerly the 9 pm news, now airing at 10:30 pm. Channel 5's new newsroom was built at a cost of S$8 million. The 10:30 pm bulletin also aired on the short-lived international service, Singapore International Television.

Another revamp occurred on 1 September 1997. News 5 at Seven introduced Jill Neubronner as presenter, while News 5 Tonight was followed at 11 pm by a 15-minute Business Day segment. Some viewers found the 45-minute combined bulletin difficult to follow, though TCS stated the changes were intended to provide more comprehensive coverage. With the launch of Channel NewsAsia in 1999, Channel 5 moved all its current-affairs programming to CNA, leaving only the main News 5 Tonight bulletin in a single 9:30 pm edition. Since 1 March 1999, it has remained the channel's sole daily news bulletin.

On 30 April 2001, News 5 Tonight adopted a new format emphasising stories of relevance to local audiences, with less focus on unrelated international news. A live studio interview was included nightly. Toh Seh Ling, previously a presenter on the teen-oriented programme Newswatch, became the new host.

As part of Channel 5's "Local Upsize" announcement on 1 November 2014, News 5 Tonight moved to a 9 pm slot and was rebranded as News 5 on 31 December 2014. It was mainly presented by Otelli Edwards on weekdays and Angela Lim on weekends.

On 19 October 2020, the bulletin was renamed News Tonight, with Glenda Chong becoming the primary weekday presenter and Angela Lim remaining as the main weekend presenter. Since early 2025, with Chong on maternity leave, weekday presentation duties have been temporarily taken over by Genevieve Woo. However, with Chong returning in April 2026 for Asia Now 2pm timeslots instead, Woo has still resumed her presentation duties for News Tonight for foreesable duration.

News Tonight is one of two major English-language national newscasts in Singapore, alongside CNA's Singapore Tonight. According to the 2019 Reuters Institute Digital News Report, the programme received a reliability score of 6.81, compared with 6.88 for The Straits Times, 6.90 for BBC News, and 7.01 for CNA.

== Title history ==
- Berita Singapura (newsreels, 15 February 1963 – 1975)
- News in English / News (15 February 1963 – 31 December 1993)
- News 5 at Seven (1 January 1994 – 28 February 1999)
- News 5 Tonight (1 January 1994 – 30 December 2014)
- News 5 Today (3 July 1995 – 26 February 1999)
- News 5 (31 December 2014 – 18 October 2020)
- News Tonight (19 October 2020–present)

== Segments ==
=== Traffic ===
Before the launch of CNA, News 5 at Seven included traffic updates using cameras positioned across Singapore. In February 1997, TCS added directional arrows to provide clearer information on traffic flow. Traffic updates moved to CNA in 1999.

=== Weather ===
Beginning 1 May 1980, "weather girls" were introduced to the English bulletins and appeared after the main news segment. In addition to Singapore weather data, which had been included since the programme's inception, an international section featuring forecasts for major regional cities (Jakarta, Kuala Lumpur, Bangkok, Manila, Hong Kong, Taipei, Tokyo and Seoul) was added, as well as wind conditions in the South China Sea. This format had already been in use on SBC radio stations. These weather bulletins were pre-recorded at 8:00 pm.

A new group of part-time presenters was introduced in 1981, each earning S$25 per report. The separate weather segment ended in March 1982, as the weather report within the main bulletin was deemed sufficient. On 26 March 1984, the weather segment at the end of the bulletin was limited to Singapore data only, although foreign data continued to be available via SBCText and radio stations.

Meteorologists returned to the broadcast in October 1996, with Charlene Pang presenting on weekdays and Claudine Quek on weekends. The weather segment was extended to two minutes and included three-day forecasts for Singapore, pinpoint rain forecasts, tide times, sunrise times, and an expanded regional forecast with a flyby sequence covering areas from Indonesia to Japan. One viewer criticised the revamped presentation style, describing the hand movements used to illustrate wind currents as "very fake".

The programme currently features sponsored weather updates before commercial breaks.
