= Xavier Ong =

Singaporean actor (born 1994)

- Born: 20 April 1994 (age 31); Singapore
- Occupation(s): Actor, model
- Years active: 2012-Present
- Parent: Wang Yuqing

Chinese name
- Traditional Chinese: 王勝宇
- Simplified Chinese: 王胜宇
Transcriptions
Standard Mandarin
- Hanyu Pinyin: Wáng ShèngYǔ
- Website: http://facebook.com/officialxavierong

Xavier Ong (Chinese: 王勝宇 / 王胜宇; pinyin: Wang Sheng Yu, born 20 April 1994) is a Singaporean actor.

== Early life ==
Ong was born on 20 April 1994 in Singapore. He is the stepson of Singapore actor Wang Yuqing. He attended Outram Secondary School but did not manage to graduate due to the widely controversial incident in 2010 while he was taking the national 'O' Level examinations.

== Career ==
=== Early career ===
Ong's career began soon after he was signed on for guest roles on several local television programs. After a single episode stint on the documentary-drama Crimewatch, he made cameo appearances on several other documentary-drama series. Ong rose to fame with his role as "Alex" in local television drama Don't Stop Believin' (TV series) after which he went on to make more appearances in local television programs and further branched out into film and movies before he was enlisted into the Singapore Armed Forces in late 2012.

=== 2012-2015: Gushcloud Influencer ===
After achieving mild success with his early work, Ong was enlisted into the army and was not allowed to further appear in television or film for the period of his service. In late 2012, Ong signed on to work with influencer marketing agency Gushcloud International where he started getting engaged in social media campaigns. Ong was involved in several online disputes involving Xiaxue and other Gushcloud influencers. Ong stepped out to apologise for his mistake after receiving backlash following the incident. Ong is said to have terminated his contract with Gushcloud in 2015.

=== 2015-Present: Taiwan and Singapore ===
In 2015, after Ong finished serving the nation, he left Gushcloud and ventured into the Taiwan entertainment scene where he made frequent appearances on variety shows but returned to Singapore in late 2015. Ong ended up filming several other television dramas in Singapore with the last being C.L.I.F. 4 and has since returned to Taiwan to further his career.

In January 2017, Ong made his silver screen comeback in the Chinese New Year movie The Fortune Handbook which also stars Christopher Lee, Li Nan Xing, Mark Lee and Vivian Lai. Also in 2017, Ong played "Alfred"; his first role as a Leading Male in StarHub telemovie Uplift which aired in August 2017 on Starhub ECity.

== Personal life ==
In September 2021, Ong came out as gay on his Instagram.

== Filmography ==
=== TV series ===
Year	Title	Role	Notes
2022	The Lying Theory	Larry	Lead Role; Viddsee Original Series
2021	Le Prawn Park	Ah Guan	Channel 5 Series
2020	Titoudao: Inspired by a True Wayang Star 剃头刀——阿签传奇	Ah Long 啊隆	Channel 5 Series; Dubbed for Channel 8
2019	After The Stars 攻星计	Francis	Cameo
2019	The Driver 伺机	Edgar	Toggle Original Series
2019	My One in a Million 我的万里挑一	Titus	Cameo
2019	While You Were Away 一切从昏睡开始	Ian	
2019	Wonder Kiss 神奇之吻	Ace	Toggle Original Series
2019	Hello From The Other Side 阴错阳差	Ken	
2019	Walk With Me 谢谢你出现在我的行程里	Danny	
2018	Blessing 2 祖先保佑 2	Liu Qingfeng 刘青峰	
2018	Dream Walker 梦醒者	Sisi	Toggle Original Series
2018	Die Die Also Must Serve 战备好兄弟	Recruit Sim	Cameo; Toggle Original Series
2017	Life Less Ordinary 小人物向前冲	Nat	Cameo; 130 Episodes Long Running TV Series
2016	C.L.I.F. 4 警徽天职4	Zen	Cameo
2016	The Dream Job 绝世好工	Taka	Cameo
2016	Life - Fear Not 人生无所畏	Ah Cong 阿聪	120 Episodes Long Running TV Series
2013	C.L.I.F. 2 警徽天职2	Xiao Jiahao 萧家豪	Cameo
2012	It Takes Two 对对碰	David	
2012	Don't Stop Believin' 我们等你	Alex	

=== Movies ===
Year	Title	Role	Notes
2017	Uplift 举重小女将	Alfred	Starhub Telemovie
2017	The Fortune Handbook 财神爷	Ben	Son of Soh Hock (played by Christopher Lee) and Ah Zhen (played by Vivian Lai)
2013	That Girl in Pinafore 我的朋友，我的同学，我爱过的一切	James	
2012	Imperfect (film) 我们都不完美	Alex	
2012	Dance Dance Dragon 龙众舞		Cameo; "shen@heaven.com"
