= List of Singaporean films of 2019 =

This is a list of films produced in Singapore ordered by release in 2019.

| Date | Title | Director | Producer | Production Cost | Singapore Gross | Ref. |
|---|---|---|---|---|---|---|
| 3 January 2019 | Make It Big Big | Mark Lee | King Kong Media Production | | | |
| 5 February 2019 | Killer Not Stupid | Jack Neo | J Team, mm2 Entertainment | $2.7 million | $800,000 | |
| 14 February 2019 | When Ghost Meets Zombie | Han Yew Kwang | WaWa Pictures, Shining Entertainment Investment, Clover Films, Artistes Marketing Asia, AC Music Entertainment | | | |
| 8 March 2019 | Repossession | Ming Siu Goh, Scott C. Hillyard | Monkey & Boar | | | |
| 13 March 2019 | One Taxi Ride | Mak Chun Kit | Wonderland Pictures | | | |
| 20 March 2019 | Living for Art | Sookoon Ang | | | | |
| 11 April 2019 | From Victoria Street To Ang Mo Kio(从维多利亚到宏茂桥) | Eva Tang | CHIJ St Nicholas Girls' School | | | |
| 16 May 2019 | The Man on the Other Side | Marcus Lim | Militancy Films, Doghouse Filmproductions | €400,000 $645,000 | | |
| 15 June 2019 | Accept the Call | Eunice Lau | Eunice Lau, Yasu Inoue, Ben Selkow, Noland Walker, Sue Turley | | | |
| 30 June 2019 | Hell Hole (⿁地⽅) | Sam Loh | mm2 Entertainment, Vividthree Productions | | | |
| 19 July 2019 | Lihaaf (The Quilt) | Rahat Kazmi | Rahat Kazmi Films, Nutzaboutme, Tariq Khan Productions, Zeba Sajid Films, Dreams Beyond, Marc Baschet | | | |
| 21 July 2019 | Changfeng Town | Wang Jing | Anzhu Films, Wormwood Films | | | |
| 12 August 2019 | Nhà cây (The Tree House) | Trương Minh Quý | Levo Films, Lagi Film, Inselfilm Produktion, Sarl Kafard Films, New Asian Filmmakers Collective | | | |
| 29 August 2019 | Revenge of the Pontianak | Glen Goei, Gavin Yap | Tiger Tiger Pictures, 13 Little Pictures | | $912,000 | |
| 31 August 2019 | Kathaah@8 (Stories@8) | Shilpa Krishnan Shukla | Kathaah Productions | | | |
| 4 September 2019 | The Long Walk | Mattie Do | Lao Art Media, Screen Division, Aurora Media Holdings | | | |
| 8 September 2019 | Wet Season | Anthony Chen | Giraffe Pictures, HOOQ, Rediance, New Century Influence | | | |
| 19 September 2019 | The Playbook | Bryan Wong | Channel U, Toggle.sg | | | |
| 6 October 2019 | Maadathy, An Unfairy Tale | Leena Manimekalai | Karuvachy Films, Golden Ratio Films | | | |
| 1 November 2019 | Motel Acacia | Bradley Liew | Black Sheep, Epicmedia, Mandarin Vision, Tier Pictures, Potocol, Studio Virc, Nukleus Films, Globe Studios, White Light Post | | | |
| 24 November 2019 | I Dream of Singapore | Lei Yuan Bin | Tiger Tiger Pictures | | | |
| 24 November 2019 | The Saint Soldier: Uncovering the Bhai Maharaj Singh Story | Upneet Kaur-Nagpal | Uptake Media | | | |
| 26 November 2019 | Revolution Launderette (信念のメリーゴーランド) | Mark Chua, Lam Li Shuen | Emoumie | | | |
| 26 November 2019 | Unteachable | Yong Shu Ling | Media For Social Change | | | |
