= List of Singaporean films of 2024 =

This is a list of films produced in Singapore ordered by release in 2024.

Date	Title	Director	Producer	Production Cost	Singapore Gross	Ref.
27 January 2024	Small Hours of the Night	Daniel Hui	13 Little Pictures			
31 January 2024	Oversteer	Derrick Lui	Vogue Films			
1 February 2024	Money No Enough 3	Jack Neo	HiJack Pictures, mm2 Entertainment, B-01 Films, Clover Films, J Team Productions	$2.8 million	$4.875 million	
8 February 2024	Fat Hope	Joyce Lee	Encore Films			
19 February 2024	Some Rain Must Fall《空房间里的女人》	Qiu Yang	Wild Grass Films, Why Not Productions, Good Chaos, Cinema Inutile, La Fonte, Aurua Yangshuo, XS Media			
20 February 2024	Cu Li Never Cries	Phạm Ngọc Lân	Cadence Studio, An Nam Productions, Purple Tree Content, E&W Films, Acrobates Films, Epicmedia Productions Inc, Ape & Bjørn / Storm Films			
22 February 2024	King of Hawkers	Kelvin Sng	KSP Production		$135,269	
28 March 2024	Good Goodbye 《好好说再见》	Daniel Yam	mm2 Entertainment		$47,299	
16 May 2024	An Unfinished Film	Lou Ye	Yingfilms Pte. Ltd., Essential Filmproduktion			
20 May 2024	Mongrel	Chiang Wei Liang, You Qiao Yin	E&W Films, Le Petit Jardin, Deuxième Ligne Films			
22 May 2024	Viêt and Nam	Trương Minh Quý	Epicmedia Productions, E&W Films, Deuxième Ligne Films, An Original Picture, Scarlet Visions, Volos Films, Lagi Limited			
30 May 2024	The Chosen One 《流氓驱魔师》	Lim Suat Yen	NoonTalk Media, Oak3 Films, Current Pictures		$40,026	
6 June 2024	I Not Stupid 3 《小孩不笨3》	Jack Neo	mm2 Entertainment, J Team Productions		$1.735 million	
30 June 2024	Salam Gembira (Happy Greetings)	Dzul Sungit	Studio59 Concepts			
3 July 2024	Pierce 《刺心切骨》	Nelicia Low	Potocol, Flash Forward Entertainment, Harine Films		$17,982	
11 July 2024	Gold	Adrian Teh	Astro Shaw, ACT 2 Pictures, Clover Films, One Cool Films			
20 July 2024	Operation Undead	Kongkiat Komesiri	Infocusasia (IFA) Media, Kongkiat Production, 360 Productions		$3,781	
18 August 2024	Ibu (A Mother's Love)	M. Raihan Halim	mm2 Entertainment, Papahan Films		$5,297	
3 September 2024	Don't Cry, Butterfly	Dương Diệu Linh	Momo Film Co, FUSEE, Kalei Films, Kawankawan Media			
5 September 2024	Stranger Eyes	Yeo Siew Hua	Akanga Film Asia, Volos Films, Films de Force Majeure, Cinema Inutile			
9 September 2024	Crocodile Tears	Tumpal Tampubolon	Talamedia, Acrobates Films, Giraffe Pictures, Poetik Film, 2Pilots Filmproduction			
23 September 2024	Regretfully at Dawn	Sivaroj Kongsakul	Extra Virgin Co, E&W Films			
4 October 2024	MA – Cry of Silence	The Maw Nang	One Point Zero, Plus Point One, Massala, Potocol, DUOfilm, Alpha Violet Production			
4 October 2024	Village Rockstars 2	Rima Das	Flying River Films, Akanga Film Asia			
11 October 2024	Spirit World	Eric Khoo	M.I. Movies, Knockonwood, Zhao Wei Films			
30 October 2024	Orang Ikan	Mike Wiluan	Gorylah Pictures, SC Films International, Zhao Wei Films, Tigon Pictures, Yaman Films			
30 October 2024	Homebound	Rui En, Lawrence Wong, Tejas Ewing, Jason Lee, Jeremy Kieran Ng & Zhang Minhua	Save Our Street Dogs Singapore			
3 November 2024	Hougang: The Documentary	Zen Yeo, Janson Choo	The Workers' Party		N/A	
13 November 2024	Some Nights I Feel Like Walking	Petersen Vargas	Daluyong Studios, Origin8 Media, Giraffe Pictures, Momo Film Co, Volos Films			
28 November 2024	Hi Noel	Eric Wong	Cande Pictures		$31,916	
1 December 2024	The House of Janus	Ong Keng Sen	T:>Works			
6 December 2024	City of Small Blessings	Wong Chen-Hsi	Akanga Film Asia, mm2 Entertainment, Purple Tree Content			
7 December 2024	Al Awda	Jason Soo	Jason Soo			
30 December 2024	Let's Get Rich (我们一起发)	Jaspers Lai	mm2 Entertainment, Cornerstone Pictures		$6,404	
