= List of Singaporean films of 2018 =

This is a list of films produced in Singapore ordered by release in 2018.

| Date | Title | Director | Producer | Production Cost | Singapore Gross | Ref. |
|---|---|---|---|---|---|---|
| 25 January 2018 | Jonaki | Aditya Vikram Sengupta | Magic Hour Films, Catherine Dussart Productions | | | |
| 30 January 2018 | Their Remaining Journey (灰彩虹) | John Clang | Elin Tew | | | |
| 15 February 2018 | Wonderful! Liang Xi Mei | Jack Neo | J Team/mm2 Entertainment | | $2 million | |
| 29 March 2018 | Ramen Teh | Eric Khoo | Zhao Wei Films/Wild Orange Artists | | $136,124 | |
| 5 April 2018 | The Wayang Kids (戏曲总动员) | Raymond Tan | Brainchild Pictures | | $41,039 | |
| 21 June 2018 | The Big Day | Lee Thean-jeen | Clover Films, mm2 Entertainment, Weiyu Films | $1.5 million | $191,821 | |
| 29 June 2018 | Cannonball | Mark Chua, Lam Li Shuen | Emoumie | | | |
| 19 July 2018 | Buffalo Boys | Mike Wiluan | Infinite Frameworks/Zhao Wei Films | | $2,549 | |
| August 2018 | Tashi | Shilpa Krishnan Shukla | Kathaah Productions | | | |
| 2 August 2018 | A Family Tour (自由行) | Ying Liang | Taiwan Public Television Service/90 Minutes Film Studio/Potocol/Shine Pictures | | | |
| 7 August 2018 | A Land Imagined | Yeo Siew Hua | Akanga Film Asia/mm2 Entertainment/Films de Force Majeure/Volya Films | | | |
| 9 August 2018 | 23:59: The Haunting Hour | Gilbert Chan | Clover Films/mm2 Entertainment | | $616,313 | |
| 10 August 2018 | Republic Of Food | Kelvin Tong | Boku Films | | $2,071 | |
| 6 October 2018 | Demons | Daniel Hui | 13 Little Pictures | | | |
| 25 October 2018 | Zombiepura | Jacen Tan | mm2 Entertainment/Clover Films/JAB Films/Infinite Frameworks/Bert Pictures | | $359,232 | |
| 17 November 2018 | Konpaku | Remi M Sali | Studio59 Concepts | | | |
| 28 November 2018 | Temporary Visa | Ghazi Alqudcy | WideWall Studio | | | |
| 5 December 2018 | The Last Artisan | Craig McTurk | Latent Image Productions | | | |
