= List of Singaporean films of 2011 =

This is a list of films produced in Singapore ordered by release in 2011.

Date	Title	Director	Producer	Production Cost	Singapore Gross	Ref.
6 January 2011	The Ghosts Must Be Crazy	Mark Lee, Boris Boo	J Team Productions	$1.2 million	$1,450,000	
13 January 2011	Lelio Popo	Adrian Teh	Cathay-Keris Films, Clover Films	$850,000		
27 January 2011	It's a Great, Great World	Kelvin Tong	MediaCorp Raintree Pictures	$2 million	$2,450,000	
3 February 2011	Homecoming	Lee Thean-jeen	Homerun Asia	$1.5 million	$1,400,000	
3 March 2011	Forever	Wee Li Lin	Bobbing Buoy Films, Add Oil Films, Singapore Film Commission	$500,000	$44,347	
17 March 2011	Perfect Rivals	Han Yew Kwang	A I Pictures, MM2 Entertainment, Singapore Film Commission		$155,000	
1 April 2011	Mausams	Shilpa Krishnan Shukla	Kathaah Productions	$5,000		
14 April 2011	The Ultimate Winner	Li Nanxing	HE Productions		$354,000	
28 July 2011	Twisted	Chai Yee Wei	Clover Films Pte Ltd		$340,099	
29 July 2011	Where the Road Meets the Sun	Yong Mun Chee	Big Machine Films			
10 September 2011	Before We Forget	Jeremy Boo & Lee Xian Jie	Hachisu, Lien Foundation		NA	
15 September 2011	Tatsumi	Eric Khoo	Zhao Wei Films	$1,011,034.18	$22,000	
17 September 2011	Echoing Love	Edmund Chen			NA	
18 September 2011	I Have Loved	Elizabeth Wijaya, Lai Weijie	13 Little Pictures			
19 September 2011	Sing the Blues	Kenny Ong	Momentum			
24 September 2011	Fairytales	Kelvin Sng	Kelvin Sng Productions			
24 September 2011	Ignore All Detour Signs	Helmi Ali, Razin Ramzi				
24 September 2011	Eclipses	Daniel Hui	13 Little Pictures			
25 September 2011	The Outsiders	Madhav Mathur	Bad Alliteration Films			
3 November 2011	23:59	Gilbert Chan	Gorylah Pictures, mm2 Entertainment, Grand Brilliance, Clover Films	$700,000	$1,550,000	
3 November 2011	Already Famous	Michelle Chong	Huat Films, Scorpio East	$899,000	$1.4 million	
