= List of Singaporean films of 2020 =

This is a list of films produced in Singapore ordered by release in 2020.

| Date | Title | Director | Producer | Production Cost | Singapore Gross | Ref. |
|---|---|---|---|---|---|---|
| 25 January 2020 | A Love Unknown | John Clang | Potocol | | | |
| 21 August 2020 | André And His Olive Tree | Josiah Ng | | | | |
| 12 September 2020 | Hell Bank Presents: Running Ghost (翻生争霸战) | Mark Lee | mm2 Entertainment | | | |
| 22 October 2020 | Number 1 | Ong Kuo Sin | mm2 Entertainment | | S$805,835 | |
| 26 October 2020 | Tiong Bahru Social Club | Tan Bee Thiam | Tiger Tiger Pictures, 13 Little Pictures | | S$108,774 | |
| 31 October 2020 | Shadows (殘影空間) | Glenn Chan | mm2 Entertainment, One Cool Film Production | | S$6,971.57 | |
| 5 November 2020 | Precious Is The Night (今宵多珍重) | Wayne Peng | Pure Films, mm2 Entertainment | | | |
| 6 November 2020 | Light of a Burning Moth(蛾の光) | Liao Jiekai | Graduate School of Film and New Media, Tokyo University of the Arts | | | |
| 25 November 2020 | Not My Mother's Baking (不是我妈妈的烘焙) | Remi M Sali | Studio59 Concepts | | | |
| 26 November 2020 | The Diam Diam Era | Jack Neo | J Team, mm2 Entertainment | | S$1,515,868 | |
| 28 November 2020 | Faraway My Shadow Wandered | Liao Jiekai | Potocol | | | |
| 29 November 2020 | Sementara | Chew Chia Shao Min and Joant Úbeda | Jump Under | | | |
| 5 December 2020 | Citizen Hustler (好公民) | Biyun Tan | Tan Biyun, Sharmeen/Sifar | | | |
