= List of Singaporean films of 2025 =

This is a list of films produced in Singapore ordered by release in 2025.

Date	Title	Director	Producer	Production Cost	Singapore Gross	Ref.
23 January 2025	Baby Hero (被逼英雄)	Kok Man Hon	Hong Pictures, Hollywood Thailand			
24 January 2025	I Want to Be Boss (AI 拼才会赢)	Jack Neo	J Team Productions, mm2 Entertainment			
28 January 2025	Number 2 (男儿王2)	Ong Kuo Sin	mm2 Entertainment, King Kong Media Production			
8 February 2025	This City Is a Battlefield	Mouly Surya	Cinesurya, Starvision, Kaninga Pictures, Giraffe Pictures, Volya Films, Shasha & Co. Production, DUOfilm AS, Purin Pictures, Epicmedia, Qun Films, Kongchak Pictures Ltd.			
15 February 2025	Vaghachipani (Tiger’s Pond)	Natesh Hegde	Flip Films, Kadalivana, Potocol			
21 March 2025	Skin of Youth	Ash Mayfair	An Nam Productions, Akanga Film Asia, Mayfair Pictures			
April 2025	Justice Devil	Harva Raj	Lion City Film Studio, Cinemascope Flms	$250,000		
24 April 2025	Pirate Queen: Zheng Yi Sao (海上女王郑一嫂)	Jie Lou, Xiaoyu Cao, Rongrui Guo, Dan Li, Ying She, Noah Wong, Jie Yin, Yue Zhang	Future Studios, FizzDragon			
15 May 2025	A Useful Ghost	Ratchapoom Boonbunchachoke	185 Films Co., Ltd.; Haut Les Mains Productions; Momo Film Co; Mayana Films			
17 May 2025	Renoir	Chie Hayakawa	Loaded Films, Happinet Phantom Studios, Dongyu, Panoramine, Ici et Là Productions, Akanga Film Asia, Daluyong Studios, Nathan Studios, KawanKawan Media			
27 June 2025	Follow Aunty La (Aunty 当网红)	Mayiduo	mm2 Entertainment, Double Up Media			
17 July 2025	We Can Save The World!!!	Cheng Chai Hong	Extraordinary Moviemaking Division			
5 August 2025	Kopitiam Days (情牵咖啡店)	Yeo Siew Hua, Shoki Lin, M. Raihan Halim, Tan Siyou, Don Aravind, Ong Kuo Sin	Zhao Wei Films, Akanga Film Asia, Clover Films			
7 September 2025	A Good Child (好孩子)	Ong Kuo Sin	SL Capital Ventures, Byleft Productions, Clover Films			
9 September 2025	Amoeba (核)	Siyou Tan	Akanga Film Asia, Volya Films, Les Films d'Antoine, Mararía Films, Widelog Office			
11 September 2025	Magik Rompak	Adrian Teh	ACT 2 Pictures, Clover Films, Astro, GSC			
20 September 2025	10s Across the Borders	Chan Sze-Wei	Daluyong Studios, Momo Film Co, Perennial Lens			
23 September 2025	Morte Cucina	Pen-ek Ratanaruang	185 Films, Little Rive Entertainment, Deal Productions, Joker Films, Gorylah Pictures, Volos Films			
23 September 2025	In the South, Thinking China: From Chinese History to Nanyang Identity (在南方，思索中國 從中華史觀到南洋認同)		Tang Prize Foundation			
2 October 2025	Badak	M. Raihan Halim	Clover Films, GSC, Papahan Films			
12 October 2025	Chasing the Star	Hao Yuzhu, Chen Yanv	Shen Hancheng			
2 November 2025	The Old Man and His Car	Michael Kam	Waking Life Pictures, Screentone	US$50,000		
30 November 2025	Sandbox	James Thoo	Brango Productions, Mocha Chai Laboratories			
30 November 2025	At Home with Work	Dave Lim, Adar Ng	Third Street Studio, National University of Singapore			
3 December 2025	Coda	Jac Min	Semicolon			
10 December 2025	Early Days	Priyankar Patra	For Films, Hazelnut Media			
