= Clouds in My Coffee (film) =

2004 Singaporean film

- Directed by: Gallen Mei
- Written by: Gallen Mei
- Starring: Ase Wang; Celeste Valdes Lim; Cindy Ng
- Cinematography: Fong Tong San
- Production company: Under Pressure Pictures
- Release date: 2004
- Country: Singapore
- Language: English

Clouds in My Coffee is a 2004 Singaporean drama film written and directed by Gallen Mei. Dealing with the struggles of young women, the film received mixed to negative reviews from local publications.

== Plot ==
Three young women's fantasies collide with the unpleasant men in their personal lives as they experience sexual assault, workplace harassment, and an unfaithful husband.

== Cast ==
- Ase Wang
- Celeste Valdes Lim
- Cindy Ng

== Release ==
The film was released in 2004 with script and direction by Gallen Mei, cinematography by Fong Tong San, and production by Under Pressure Pictures. Due to references to lesbianism in one of the fantasy sequences, the film was classified R21 upon release.

== Reception ==
Yong Shu Chiang of Today rated the film two out of five, stating in a mostly critical review that "[v]erisimilitude is rarely achieved, if ever" and criticizing how the "[m]ostly mediocre acting and a highly-implausible script cloud the film's message about how women are viewed and treated." Sylvia Toh of The New Paper gave the film 1.5 stars out of 5 in a review which highlighted the film's "male bashing." In his review of the movie, Tay Yek Keak of The Straits Times stated, "its skin-deep expose, easy caricatures and exploitative, abusive situations make them relevant probably to only director Gallen Mei and his clique of pals."

A retrospective of Singaporean film from the Far East Film Festival was mostly dismissive of Clouds in My Coffee. "Although a viable idea," the retrospective stated in reference to the film's focus on women, "the story and performances are too weak and production values too poor to sustain interest."
