= Mak Chun Kit =

Singaporean filmmaker

Mak CK
- Born: Singapore
- Other name: Mak CK
- Occupation: Filmmaker
- Years active: 2002-present
- Known for: One Taxi Ride, Buying Happiness, Little People Big Dreams

Mak Chun Kit, or Mak CK, is a Singaporean filmmaker. He has filmed in 30 countries across 5 continents directing documentaries for international broadcasters including National Geographic, Discovery, History, Lifetime, BIO, Disney, MTV and Channel NewsAsia. He had won multiple times at the New York Festivals Television and Film Awards, inclusive of a Documentary Gold World Medal for This Is What I Hear (2019) and a Best Direction Silver World Medal for China Close-up (2014).

== Career ==
Mak's debut feature-length documentary film, The World's Most Fashionable Prison (2012), about fashion designer Puey Quiñones's rehabilitation programme in the Philippine's largest maximum security prison, was an official selection at Hot Docs Canadian International Documentary Festival 2012. It won the Audience Award for Documentary Film at the Lighthouse International Film Festival 2012, and the Gold Kahuna Award for Documentary Film at the Honolulu Film Awards 2012. Jennie Kermode of Eye For Film wrote, "For a film that contains so much suffering, with so many of its protagonists living grim lives, it's impressively buoyant."

His second film, Little People Big Dreams (2014), about a little people theme park in China, was regional broadcaster Channel NewsAsia's first original feature film production. The documentary was selected for the 2014Sundance Institute Documentary Film Program | CNEX Workshop and Documentary Summit and won the Best Pitch Award at CNEX Chinese Doc Forum 2014. It made its world premiere at the 2014 CPH:DOX Copenhagen International Documentary Film Festival. The film made the Youth Jury shortlist at the 2015 Sheffield Doc/Fest. It had also won various awards, such as the Grand Jury Award for Best Documentary Feature at the Lighthouse International Film Festival 2015, Best Social Awareness Programme at the Asian Television Awards 2015, and a Gold World Medal for Documentaries at the New York Festivals Television and Film Awards 2016. Gary Arnold, President of Little People of America, wrote, "The beauty of Little People Big Dreams is that it shines a light on the dwarf theme park in China, and it lets the dwarf performers tell their own story, and it allows viewers to reach their own conclusion about the theme park."

Mak's third film, One Taxi Ride (2019), documents the journey of a male survivor in Mexico City who tries to reclaim his life 10 years after being sexually assaulted. It has screened at over 35 film festivals, received 17 Best Film nominations and won 5 Jury Awards including Premio Maguey Best Film Award at the Guadalajara International Film Festival 2019. The film spearheads a social impact campaign to support male sexual assault survivors. It is used to educate prosecutors working with victims of sexual violence at the General Attorney's Office in Guatemala. An online petition addressed to the Mexican government has garnered over 3000 signatures to date. And the documentary secured distribution targeting universities, high schools, public libraries, community groups and governmental educational institutes across US and Canada. San Francisco Bay Times wrote, "this film is important and necessary" and the Irish Film Critic called it, "an amazing documentary, so honest, real and powerful” and “a deeply intimate documentary” according to GLAAD.

In 2016, Mak started working on his next film, Buying Happiness, documenting his two-decade-long friendships with a few orphans whom he met through a volunteering stint in Tanzania. He also started a crowdfunding campaign in May 2016 to raise money to support the projects of the orphans. Funds raised would go to the projects before covering the film production.

== Filmography ==
Year	Title	Ref
2012	The World's Most Fashionable Prison	
2014	Little People Big Dreams	
2019	One Taxi Ride	
TBC	Buying Happiness	
