= List of Singaporean films of 2010 =

This is a list of films produced in Singapore ordered by release in 2010.

Date	Title	Director	Producer	Production Cost	Singapore Gross	Ref.
2010
January 2010	Memories of a Burning Tree	Sherman Ong	13 Little Pictures/Paddy Pictures			
3 January 2010	Cooking Without Clothes (煮持人)	Jean Yeo	Ochre Pictures			
4 March 2010	Being Human	Jack Neo	J Team Productions, Scorpio East Pictures, Mei Ah Entertainment Group Ltd		$916,430	
4 March 2010	Happy Go Lucky	Harry Yap	Yee Man Chan, Harry Yap		$223,027	
18 March 2010	Kidnapper	Kelvin Tong	Scorpio East Pictures Pte Ltd, RAM Entertainment Sdn Bhd., PMP Entertainment Sdn Bhd		$436,033	
8 April 2010	Gurushetram – 24 Hours of Anger	T. T. Dhavamanni	Manickam/N. Tinagaran		$99,453	
16 April 2010	Roulette City (輪盤)	Thomas Lim	Island Man Pictures			
May 2010	Red Dragonflies	Liao Jiekai	13 Little Pictures			
22 July 2010	Old Cow vs Tender Grass	Fok Chi Kai	Clover Films, Apostrophe Films		$452,456	
8 August 2010	Old Places (老地方)	Royston Tan, Eva Tang, Victric Thng	Chuan Pictures			
11 August 2010	Phua Chu Kang The Movie	Boris Boo	MM2 Entertainment Sdn Bhd, Primeworks Studios, Scorpio East Pictures, RAM Entertainment Sdn Bhd, PMP Entertainment Sdn Bhd		$328,685	
14 August 2010	Like Sunshine After Rain	Jeffrey Chiang	Cinematopia, Splices Creative			
18 August 2010	Sandcastle	Boo Junfeng	Zhao Wei Films/Fortissimo Films/Peanut Pictures	$417,021.03	$51,674	
2 September 2010	Haunted Changi	Andrew Lau	Sheena Chung, Mythopolis Pictures		$519,470	
9 September 2010	Love Cuts	Gerald Lee	Clover Films		$150,087	
October 2010	Floating Lives	Nguyen Phan Quang Binh	Vietnam Media Corp & Vietnam Studio/BHD/Mega Media			
November 2010	Breakfast, Lunch, Dinner	Wang Jing, Anocha Suwichakornpong, Kaz Cai	Wormwood Films			
3 December 2010	When Hainan Meets Teochew	Han Yew Kwang	18g Pictures	$10,000		
