= Xuan Ong =

Singaporean actress (born 1996)

- Born: Ong Yi Xuan; 5 March 1996 (age 30)
- Other names: Yi Xuan Ong; Weng Xuan; Weng Yixuan
- Education: LASALLE College of the Arts
- Occupation: Actress
- Years active: 2018–present
- Agent: Faces Talent Management

Stage name
- Traditional Chinese: 翁璇
- Simplified Chinese: 翁璇
- Hanyu Pinyin: Wēng Xuán

Birth name
- Traditional Chinese: 翁旖璇
- Simplified Chinese: 翁旖璇
- Hanyu Pinyin: Wēng Yǐxuán

Xuan Ong (born Ong Yi Xuan on 5 March 1996) is a Singaporean actress.

== Early life and career ==
Ong started out as a theatre student at the age of 13, and graduated from LASALLE College of the Arts with first class honours in Acting when she was 22 in 2018. She has since appeared in multiple shorts and stage productions, and has also been cast in MediaCorp's Channel 5 and Channel 8's drama series.

In 2021, Ong starred as Lee Mui Ee, the lead role in the coming-of-age drama Teenage Textbook: The Series, which was based on the popular Singaporean novel of the same name. This was her debut television series.

In 2023, Ong played a prominent role in Seven Days, also her debut feature film appearance. It was the first local film to be chosen to open the Singapore Chinese Film Festival. The same year, she played a spirit medium in the second season of the drama series Titoudao, a character based on a real-life person.

== Filmography ==
=== Television series ===
- Teenage Textbook: The Series (2021)
- Soul Detective (2022)
- Mr Zhou's Ghost Stories@Job Haunting II (2022)
- Titoudao: Dawn of a New Stage (2023)
- Cash on Delivery (2023)
- Stranger In The Dark (2023)

=== Web series ===
- One Take (2019; web series)
- #CoffeeShots (2020)
- Adulting (2021)

=== Film ===
- A Waking (2019; short)
- If They Can't Be Loved (2021; short)
- Trade Secrets (2021; short)
- Yi Tian (2021; short)
- Seven Days (2023; feature)
- Dragonhead Phoenix Tail Brow (2024; short)
- Thank You, Daisy (2024; short)
- We Can Save The World!!! (2025; feature)

== Theatre ==
- The Insiders (2018)
- The Cat in the Hat (2018)
- Birth Days (2018)
- Stupid Cupid (2019)
- Now She Lives (2019)
- Catalysts (2019)
- The Adventures of Abhijeet (2019)
- The Hawker (2019)
- Fika and Fishy (2020)
- The Singapore Trilogy (2021)
- A Dream Under The Southernbough- Existence (2021)
- I Have Something to Say (2022)
- The New Alice (2024)
- Titoudao- The 30th Anniversary Staging (2024)
- Home Kitchen (2025)
- A Thousand Stitches (2025)

== Awards and nominations ==
Year	Award	Category	Nominated work	Result	Ref
2022	Oniros Film Awards	Best Actress	If They Can't Be Loved	Nominated	
2022	Oniros Film Awards	Best Monologue	If They Can't Be Loved	Won	
2022	Oniros Film Awards	Honorable Mention (actress)	If They Can't Be Loved	Won	
2022	Red Movie Awards	Best Actress	If They Can't Be Loved	Won	
2024	Star Awards	Top 3 Most Popular Rising Stars	—N/a	Nominated	
2025	Star Awards	Top 3 Most Popular Rising Stars	—N/a	Nominated	
