= The Fortune Handbook =

2017 Singaporean film

- Theatrical release poster
- Directed by: Kelvin Sng
- Written by: Wen Xue Ying
- Produced by: Melvin Ang; Jack Neo; Christopher Lee; Mark Lee; Li Nanxing
- Starring: Christopher Lee; Li Nanxing; Mark Lee; Vivian Lai; Xavier Ong; Jazliyana Lee
- Cinematography: Chiu Wai Yin
- Edited by: Hamster Low , Kenzir leow
- Music by: Mo Ju Li
- Production companies: mm2 Entertainment; J Team Productions
- Distributed by: mm2 Entertainment; Shaw Organisation
- Release date: 26 January 2017 (Singapore)
- Running time: 99 minutes
- Country: Singapore
- Languages: Mandarin; Teochew
- Budget: S$1.3 million
- Box office: S$1 million

The Fortune Handbook (Chinese: 财神爷; pinyin: cái shén yé) is a 2017 Singaporean Chinese New Year comedy film directed by Kelvin Sng and starring Christopher Lee, Li Nanxing and Mark Lee. It was released in cinemas on January 26, 2017, and is one of two films distributed by mm2 Entertainment during the Chinese New Year period in 2017, the other being Take 2.

== Plot ==
Soh Hock (Christopher Lee), a never-do-well, is obsessed with becoming rich and constantly scheming to get the secret recipe to Ren Haoxing (Li Nanxing), his brother-in-law's famous traditional Chinese pastry. When a God Of Fortune named Huat God (Mark Lee) stumbles into his and his family's lives, things become messy.

== Cast ==
Cast	Role
Christopher Lee	Soh Hock
Li Nanxing	Ren Haoxing
Mark Lee	Huat God
Vivian Lai	Ah Zhen, Soh Hock's wife
Xavier Ong	Soh Hock's son
Jazliyana Lee	Soh Hock's daughter
Marcus Chin	Intern supervisor
Nathan Hartono	Fortune God intern
Sheila Sim	Fortune God intern
Ferlyn Wong	Fortune God intern
Hossan Leong	Fortune God intern
Chua Jin Sen a.k.a. Dr. Jiajia	Fortune God intern
Dawn Yeoh	Reporter
Zheng Geping	Competition judge
Hong Huifang	Competition judge
Lina Ng	Contestant No.1
Eelyn Kok	Contestant No.2
Josephus Tan	Contestant No.2 's husband
Allan Moo	Contestant No.3 's husband
Ho Ai Ling	Ma Zi
Chantalle Ng	Albee
Jasmine Sim	Mel

== Production ==
=== Casting and crew ===
Sng decided to gather the "Three Lees in Entertainment" being Christopher Lee, Mark Lee and Li Nanxing, to star in a film together. According to an interview with Weekender Singapore, Sng said that "it started out as a joke, but all three of them actually agreed to do it". All three were listed as executive producers, together with Jack Neo and Melvin Ang. It was such a success that the actors started talking about their next project together.

=== Filming ===
Li, who has always played "solemn and heavy" roles, such as a police officer, lawyer or prosecutor, took on his first comedic role because of his co-stars, saying in an interview with The Straits Times that he "signed on because of the other two." Initially, he felt awkward being cast as Vivian Lai's ex-boyfriend due to the age gap, so Sng altered the role to be her brother instead.

Filming started on October 31, 2016 with a production cost of $1.3 million, and lasted for 20 days.

== Reception ==
=== Critical reception ===
Boon Chan of The Straits Times rated The Fortune Handbook a 2 out of 5 stars, stating that although important holiday themes such as "prosperity, the importance of family and bak kwa" are present, "the end result is far from savoury" as "(Sng's) characters laugh more than the audience - hearing laughter on the screen is not the same thing as watching a funny film".

John Li of MovieXclusive.com rated the film a 2.5 out of 5 stars, citing the "countless mentions of brands or appearances of products" and that "viewers may not find all gags funny and end up wondering why the characters are laughing a lot more than the audiences".
