= Don't Go Home Tonight =

2023 Singaporean drama film

- Theatrical release poster
- Traditional Chinese: 今夜不回家
- Simplified Chinese: 今夜不回家
- Hanyu Pinyin: Jīnyè bù huí jiā
- Directed by: Kelvin Sng
- Story by: Kelvin Sng
- Produced by: Shawn Tan
- Starring: Gwen Tang; Kim So-yun; Justin Park; Lee Sung-chan; Bunz; Sun Zhen Yu; Priscelia Chan; Reuben Ho; Jack Hyde; Robert Wallace
- Cinematography: Tan Shiwei
- Edited by: Shawn Tan
- Production company: KSP Production
- Distributed by: EagleWings Cinematics
- Release date: 28 July 2023
- Running time: 91 minutes
- Country: Singapore
- Languages: English; Mandarin; Korean

Don't Go Home Tonight (Chinese: 今夜不回家) is a 2023 Singaporean drama film directed by Kelvin Sng.

== Synopsis ==
The film centres around five groups of people seated at different tables in a restaurant, and the conversations they share unravel the issues they are facing. Things soon turn awry when a blackout occurs.

== Cast ==
- Gwen Tang as Lin Ching-hsia
- Kim So-yun as Kim Hyun-joo
- Justin Park as Professor Lee Yeong-hoon
- Lee Sung-chan as Chen Xi
- Bunz as Wang Kai
- Sun Zhen Yu as Liu Jun
- Priscelia Chan
- Reuben Ho
- Jack Hyde as Father Gerald
- Robert Wallace as Lawrence

== Production ==
The film features actors from Singapore, South Korea, China, the United States and the United Kingdom. It began filming in December 2021.

Conceived without a script, the film is mainly driven by character improvisations through weeks of rehearsals and a basic premise.

== Release ==
Don't Go Home Tonight had a limited release at independent cinema line EagleWings Cinematics. It was screened exclusively on 28 and 29 July 2023.
