= King of Hawkers =

Drama film produced by Singapore director

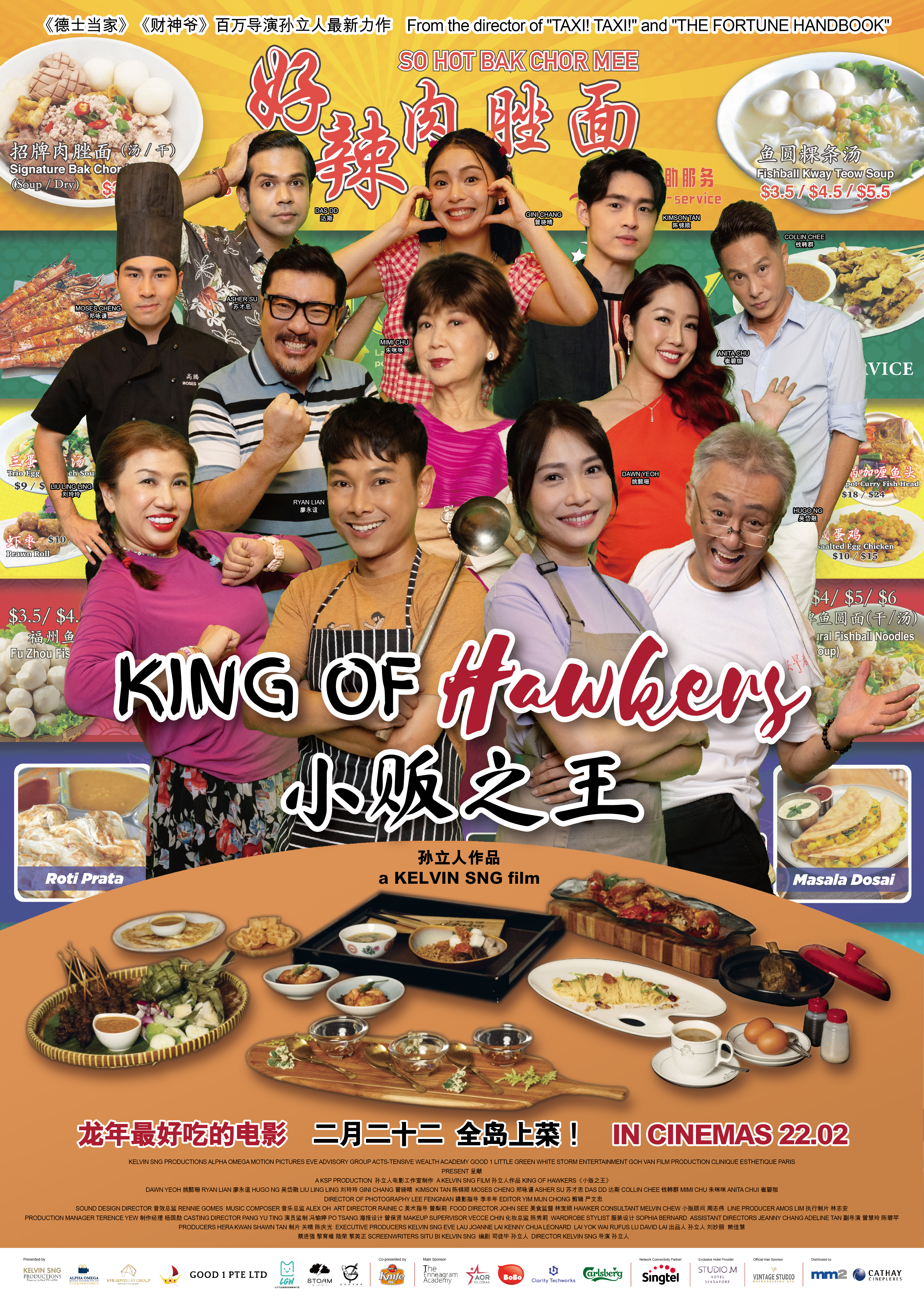
- Theatrical release poster
- Traditional Chinese: 小販之王
- Simplified Chinese: 小贩之王
- Hanyu Pinyin: Xiǎo fàn zhī wáng
- Directed by: Kelvin Sng
- Story by: Situ Bi; Kelvin Sng
- Produced by: Eve Lau (Executive Producer): Hera Kwan; Shawn Tan
- Starring: Dawn Yeoh; Ryan Lian; Hugo Ng; Liu Lingling; Anita Chui; Gini Chang; Kimson Tan; Moses Cheng; Asher Su; Das DD; Collin Chee; Mimi Chu
- Cinematography: Lee Feng Nian
- Edited by: Yim Mun Chong; Tang Alex; Yim Zhong Su
- Production company: Kelvin Sng Productions
- Distributed by: mm2 Entertainment; Cathay Cineplexes
- Release date: 22 February 2024
- Running time: 121 minutes
- Country: Singapore
- Languages: Mandarin; English; Cantonese

King of Hawkers (Chinese: 小贩之王) is a 2024 drama film directed by Kelvin Sng and produced by Hera Kwan and Shawn Tan. The screenplay was written by Situ Bi and Kelvin Sng. The film stars Dawn Yeoh, Ryan Lian, Hugo Ng, Liu Lingling, Collin Chee, Mimi Chu, Asher Su, Gini Chang, Kimson Tan, Anita Chui, Moses Cheng.

== Plot ==
Nala, a former hawker's daughter turned high-class housewife in Hong Kong, returns to her roots in Singapore after family turmoil. Upon her return, she discovers her mother's ailing health and a young man named Dong managing their family stall.

Misunderstandings arise when Dong considers selling their secret recipe, and tensions heighten when an multinational corporation linked to Nala's in-laws threatens the hawker community's traditions. As the MNC plans a competition to acquire recipes, chaos erupts among the hawkers.

Amidst this turmoil, Nala stands against the corporation's manipulative tactics to preserve Singapore's hawker culture, setting the stage for a battle between tradition and corporate greed, determining whether she can safeguard the legacy as the King (or Queen) of Hawkers.

== Cast ==
- Dawn Yeoh as Zhang Nala
- Ryan Lian as Ah dong
- Hugo Ng as Ah Lau
- Liu Lingling as Ping Jie
- Gini Chang as CP
- Kimson Tan as Kimson
- Moses Cheng as Xiao Gao
- Asher Su as Jia Sheng
- Das DD as Raja
- Collin Chee as Lee Guo Zhong
- Mimi Chu as Mrs. Lee
- Anita Chui as Fiona

== Production ==
The filming was done in the whole month of October 2023. Some venues that were used for the filming were Sims Vista Market and Food Centre, Studio M Hotel Singapore, and Housing and Development Board (HDB) flats.

== Release ==
The gala premieres of the film took place to full house crowds at Dadi Cinemas Pavilion in Kuala Lumpur, Malaysia on 19 February 2024 and Golden Village Vivocity in Singapore on 20 February 2024. The film was distributed by mm2 Entertainment and Cathay Cineplexes in Singapore, and Mega Films in Malaysia. The film was released concurrently in Singapore and Malaysia on 22 February 2024.

== Reception ==
=== Critical response ===
John Li of Movie Xclusive gave the film 3 out of 5 stars, opining that, "While the story is what you'd expect from a TV series, the 119 minute movie manages to keep the pace going and have you rooting for the good guys right till the end. This isn't the most original movie you've seen, with a number of over the top and melodramatic scenes that many local mainstream productions seem to be fond of."

Cai Xin Ying of Lianhe Zaobao gave the film 3.5 out of 5 stars, opining that film, "There are many close-up shots of hawker food in the movie, and you can feel the director's love for hawker food. These shots are the culprits that made me hungry in the theater. I would like to remind the audience who came to support this Singaporean film to eat full before entering the theater, and don't be like me, who was in a dilemma of "should I eat pork minced meat noodles or Hainanese chicken rice later" after watching the end."

Lin Jia Hao of vibes by 8world gave the film 2.5 out of 5 stars, opining that the film, "The film claims to be based on Singapore's hawker culture, and indeed many familiar hawker delicacies appear in the film, allowing the audience to "see and eat" across the big screen. " However, from the plot point of view, in addition to being filmed in hawker centers, the plot eventually extends to a cooking competition between several hawkers and Hong Kong chefs, which makes people feel that it fails to truly highlight the essence of local hawker culture. If the film can explore hawker culture more deeply and strengthen realism, I believe it will add points to the film. In any case, "King of Hawkers" chose to release in the Lantern Festival slot, and overall still presents a hot and bustling atmosphere, allowing the audience to welcome the Lantern Festival happily."

Tay Yek Keak of 8days gave the film 2 out of 5 stars, opining that the film, "This run-of-the-mill cooking competition flick featuring our hawker food — bak chor mee, chilli crab, bak kut teh, etc — throws in expected ingredients. Including a cockroach-eating scene (hey, it's hawker fare after all). But the whole blend goes bland due to an average, outdated TV-ish script gone askew.", and that the film feels "a mild swallow, stuffs itself with too many unnecessary characters while veering off course from chirpy livestream comedy to clunky sabotage drama."

=== Accolades ===
| Award | Year | Category | Nominee(s) | Result | Ref. |
|---|---|---|---|---|---|
| Golden Lotus Awards | 2024 | Best Supporting Actor | Hugo Ng | Nominated | |
| Golden Lotus Awards | 2024 | Best Supporting Actress | Mimi Chu | Nominated | |
| Asian Art Film Awards | 2025 | Best Actress | Gini Chang | Nominated | |
| Asian Art Film Awards | 2025 | Best Feature Film | —N/a | Won | |
| ASEAN International Film Festival & Awards | 2025 | Best Film Editing | —N/a | Nominated | |
