= List of Singaporean films of 2013 =

This is a list of films produced in Singapore ordered by release in 2013.

Date	Title	Director	Producer	Production Cost	Singapore Gross	Ref.
3 January 2013	Taxi! Taxi!	Kelvin Sng	SIMF Management	$1 million	$1,430,018	
24 January 2013	Time No Enough	JP Tan	Just Simply Perfect Productions			
30 January 2013	Ah Boys to Men 2	Jack Neo	Jack Neo/Lim Teck/Leonard Lai	$1.5 million	$7,895,058	
14 February 2013	Love... And Other Bad Habits	Lee Thean-jeen	Huanwen Li			
14 February 2013	Wedding Diary II	Adrian Teh	Clover Films	$1.2 million	$277,729	
22 February 2013	Red Numbers	Dominic Ow	Chan Gin Kai/Edmund Chen/Alvin Soe	$800,000	$14,000	
7 March 2013	Ghost Child	Gilbert Chan	Lim Teck/Eric Khoo		$523,848	
13 March 2013	Durian King	David Hevey	Firefly Films			
23 March 2013	The Great North Korean Picture Show	Lynn Lee, James Leong	Lynn Lee/Sharon Roobol			
April 2013	Menstrual Man	Amit Virmani	Kui Luan Seah/Amit Virmani		$6,500	
18 April 2013	Judgement Day	Ong Kuo Sin	Mark Lee	$1 million	$305,617	
24 June 2013	Mister John	Joe Lawlor, Christine Molloy	David Collins, Fran Borgia, Joe Lawlor			
1 August 2013	That Girl in Pinafore	Chai Yee Wei	Eugene Lee		$551,132	
29 August 2013	Ilo Ilo	Anthony Chen	Ang Hwee Sim/ Yuni Hadi	$700,000	$1,227,925	
8 September 2013	Canopy	Aaron Wilson	Finer Films, Chuan Pictures	AUD $1.3 million		
3 October 2013	To Singapore, with Love	Tan Pin Pin	Tan Pin Pin			
6 October 2013	Letters from the South	Aditya Assarat, Royston Tan, Midi Z, Sun Koh, Tan Chui Mui, Tsai Ming-liang	Da Huang Pictures			
24 October 2013	3:50	Eysham Ali, Chhay Bora	Silver Media Group, House of Ou Studios			
November 2013	Wukan: The Flame of Democracy	Lynn Lee, James Leong	Lianain Films			
14 November 2013	3 Peas in a Pod	Michelle Chong	Michelle Chong/Pauline Yu/Irving Artemas	$1.7 million	$500,000	
November 2013	Sayang Disayang	Sanif Olek	Sanif Olek	$400,000		
5 December 2013	Everybody's Business	Lee Thean-jeen	Pui Yin Chan/Yan Yan Chan/Yok Wai Leonard Lai/Saw Yam Seah/Soo Wei Toong		$730,000	
5 December 2013	I Hugged The Berlin Patient	Edgar Tang, Dzul Sungit	Edgar Tang/Dzul Sungit		$8,463	
