= Seven Days (2023 film) =

2023 Singaporean drama film

- Theatrical release poster
- Chinese: 七天
- Hanyu Pinyin: Qītiān
- Directed by: Grace Wu
- Written by: Grace Wu
- Produced by: Michelle Chang
- Starring: Ya Hui; Ayden Sng; Henry Thia; Xuan Ong
- Cinematography: Sharon Loh
- Edited by: Andy Tseng
- Music by: Fourth and Third
- Production companies: Tigon Pictures; Mocha Chai Laboratories; New Era Group
- Distributed by: Clover Films; Golden Village Pictures
- Release dates: 28 April 2023 (Singapore Chinese Film Festival); 12 May 2023 (Singapore)
- Running time: 102 minutes
- Country: Singapore
- Languages: Mandarin; Hokkien

Seven Days (Chinese: 七天) is a 2023 Singaporean supernatural drama film written and directed by Grace Wu in her directorial debut. The film revolves around a female ghost who incidentally took a chance to possess her younger brother's body for seven days to resolve unsettled matters with her family. The film premiered as the opening film of the Singapore Chinese Film Festival on 28 April 2023 and was released in theatres on 12 May 2023.

== Cast ==
- Ya Hui as Luo Ai-ling
  - Alicia Low as young Luo Ai-ling
- Ayden Sng as Luo Ai-xiang
  - Charles Lam as young Luo Ai-xiang
- Henry Thia as Old Ghost (Chen Wei-kang)
- Xuan Ong as Luo Ai-shi
- Regina Lim as Chen Jing-yao
- Brian Ng as Wang Xun-yang
- Peter Yu as Father
- Doreen Toh as Mother
- Jasmine Sim as Lisa
- Benjamin Eio as Frank
- Liow Shi Suen as Xun-yang's mother
- Debra Loi as Kelly
- Elvis Chin as Henry
- Teo Ser Lee as Café customer
- Goh Wee-Ann as Ai-ling's daughter
- Nicholas Lim as Ai-ling's son
- Oh Ling En as young Ai-ling's classmate

== Production and marketing ==
Principal photography began on 13 March 2022.

Director and writer Grace Wu, who was born in Chongqing, became the first Chinese director to shoot a Singaporean-produced film. Seven Days also became the first Singaporean film to have its own NFT film art collection available on the platform OpenSea.
