= The Man on the Other Side =

- Theatrical release poster
- German: Der Mann auf der anderen Seite
- Directed by: Marcus Lim
- Written by: Marcus Lim
- Produced by: Thomas Hillenbrand
- Starring: Mari Bensel; James Carney; Nils Schulz; Jörg Malchow
- Cinematography: Joris Bölt
- Music by: Pablo Anson
- Production company: Militancy Pte Ltd Doghouse Filmproductions
- Distributed by: Capitol Motion Picture Group (USA/UK); Tribes Media (LATAM)
- Release dates: May 16, 2019 (International Inca Imperial Film Festival); January 2021
- Running time: 85 minutes
- Countries: Singapore, Germany
- Languages: English, German

The Man On The Other Side is a 2019 Singapore-German spy film, written and directed by Marcus Lim and produced by Lim and Thomas Hillenbrand. The film is Lim's debut feature film and was the first theatrical co-production between the two countries.

An espionage thriller, set in 1970s Cold War Germany, the film explores the phenomenon of Romeo agents, East German spies sent to seduce and compromise West German women in vulnerable political appointments.

The film won the Festival Prize for Best Feature Film at the 2019 Montevideo World Film Festival, and had a limited theatrical release in Singapore in 2021.

== Plot ==
In 1974, Sophie Zimmermann is a meek, bespectacled woman in her late-30s, working for the West German Federal Ministry of Defence in Bonn. For six months, she has been copying top secret government documents. Following a tense interrogation by a superior officer, she makes a run for the border. On the day of the escape, however, she is captured by a mysterious, unknown assailant.

Sophie wakes up in a dimly lit cellar, drugged and tied. While trying to break free of her restraints, she remembers her first meeting with Dieter Shaeffer, a smooth talking young salesman who captured her heart, and set her on the path of stealing top secret documents.

As she tries to find her way out of this makeshift prison, she discovers a young Englishman imprisoned in an inner room. Sophie is told that she has been captured by the Stasi, and that they are deep in East Germany. Her boyfriend, it seems, has betrayed her.

As Sophie and the Englishman plot to escape, they bond together in their shared suffering. She reveals to him, the government secrets that she had shared with Dieter, while he tells her of his unsuccessful, desperate solo attempt at smuggling his Russian girlfriend to the safety of the West.

It turns out that her captor is in fact, the Englishman, who is an MI6 agent. They are in fact, not in East Germany, but in a safe house somewhere in rural North Rhine-Westphalia, in West Germany.

Because of conditions in the federal constitution, BND intelligence agents are not allowed to torture and kill West German citizens. Instead, they have contracted the MI6 agent to find out exactly how much she knew, and what information she passed on to the Stasi, which includes information on the number of nuclear missiles placed in West Germany by the Americans.

Sophie escapes, and is chased throughout the darkened and abandoned hotel. She manages to lock the Englishman in another cell, and finds Dieter, tortured and near death. Sharing Dieter's last breaths, a grieving Sophie, walks out of the hotel and into a new life, leaving the Englishman locked up to a slow and lonely death.

== Cast ==
- Mari Bensel as Sophie Zimmermann
- James Carney as Englishman
- Nils Schulz as Dieter Schäfer
- Jörg Malchow as Staatssekretär

== Release ==
Italy's Iuvit Media Sales signed on as the film's international sales agent after its debut at the International Independent Film Awards. The film was released in theaters in Singapore on 3 January 2021 by Militancy Pte Ltd.

In January 2021, it was announced that Capital Motion Picture Group had come on board as the North American and United Kingdom distributor. The film has also been licensed to SVOD specialist Tribes Media for streaming in Latin America, Benelux, Spain and Scandinavia.

== Reception ==
=== Critical response ===
Film review publication Sinema.SG lauded the film for its recreation of the cinema styles of the 1970s, acclaiming it for its "realistic and horrifying view of the espionage world", and calling it "an exceedingly refreshing entry into the pantheon of local cinema that marvels with its ambition and deft."

=== Accolades ===
The Man on the Other Side premiered on May 16, 2019 at the International Inca Imperial Film Festival, where it was nominated for the Best Narrative Feature in the section International Competition of Feature Films.

Other prizes include Best Feature Film at the 'Montevideo World Film Festival' on July 13, 2019.

Festival	Award	Category	Recipient(s) and nominee(s)	Result	Ref(s)
Montevideo World Film Festival	Festival Prize	Best Feature Film	Marcus Lim Thomas Hillenbrand	Winner	
International Independent Film Awards	Gold Award	Narrative Feature	Marcus Lim Thomas Hillenbrand	Winner	
Genre Celebration Festival	Jury Award	Best Noir Feature	Marcus Lim Thomas Hillenbrand	Nominee	
	Jury Award	Best Actress	Mari Bensel	Nominee	
Calcutta International Cult Film Festival	CICFF Award	Debut Filmmaker	Marcus Lim	Winner	
Five Continents International Film Festival	Best Cinematography	Feature Film	Joris Bölt	Winner	
