= Red Dragonflies =

- movie poster
- Directed by: Liao Jiekai
- Starring: Jason Hui, Ng Xuan Ming, Oon Yee Jeng, Thow Xin Wei
- Release date: 5 May 2011 (Singapore)
- Running time: 96 minutes
- Country: Singapore
- Language: English
- Budget: $30,000

Red Dragonflies is a Singapore film directed by Liao Jiekai. It was released in Singapore cinemas on 5 May 2011.

The film won a special jury prize at the Jeonju International Film Festival in 2010.

== Plot ==
Three Junior College students, Rachel, Tien and Jun begin exploring an abandoned railway track, and an accident happens. Three years later, Rachel and Tien cross paths again.

== Reception ==
Boon Chan of The Straits Times gave the film 2.5 stars out of 5, stating, "The spirit of exploration is alive and well in Red Dragonflies but, unfortunately, this feature debut feels like it may have wandered off the tracks".
