= List of Singaporean films of 2004 =

This is a list of films produced in Singapore ordered by release in 2004.

Date	Title	Director	Producer	Production Cost	Singapore Gross	Ref.
18 March 2004	The Eye 2	Danny Pang/Oxide Pang	Raintree Pictures/Applause Pictures	US$3,000,000	$1,577,000	
28 April 2004	Perth	Djinn	Working Man Films/Ground Glass Images	$400,000	$61,000	
30 April 2004	Zombie Dogs	Toh Hai Leong	Zhao Wei Films	NA	NA	
June 2004	Nobody's Child	Lin Wenhui	新格媒体公司			
9 June 2004	The Best Bet	Jack Neo	Raintree Pictures	$1,500,000	$2,664,000	
5 August 2004	Clouds in My Coffee	Gallen Mei	Reversal Films	US$125,000	$11,000	
15 September 2004	Avatar	Kuo Jian Hong	Cinemancer	US$2,000,000	NA	
29 October 2004	Tequila	Jonathan Lim	Crimson Forest Films	US$13,000	NA	
