= A Month of Hungry Ghosts =

- Directed by: Tony Kern
- Produced by: Genevieve Woo; Tony Kern
- Edited by: Tony Kern
- Music by: MoShang
- Production company: Mythopolis Pictures
- Distributed by: Golden Village Pictures
- Release date: 7 August 2008
- Running time: 99 minutes
- Language: English

A Month of Hungry Ghosts is a 2008 film about the seventh-lunar-month Hungry Ghost Festival in Singapore. A Month of Hungry Ghosts is directed by Singapore-based American film director Tony Kern and co-produced by Genevieve Woo, a Singaporean television news anchor and producer with Channel NewsAsia, and Tony Kern. The film was released locally in Singapore on 7 August 2008. The film is distributed by Golden Village Pictures, and premiered at Golden Village VivoCity, Golden Village Plaza and Sinema Old School.

== Plot ==
In parts of Asia each year, during the seventh lunar month, it is believed that the gates of Hell are opened and all the souls are set free to wander the Earth. At this time, many spirits roam around trying to fulfill their past needs, wants and desires. These are the "hungry ghosts". Numerous religious rituals and folk performances, like street operas, take place during the seventh lunar month to try to appease the spirits.

This film captures the seventh-lunar-month rituals in Singapore, a world-class centre of business and culture inhabited by many different immigrants from other Asian countries. While the hungry-ghost rituals originated in China and are still practised throughout South-east Asia in various forms, they are slowly dying out in many countries or may only be performed for several days of the month.

Singapore is unique in that the rituals are brought to life throughout the entire seventh lunar month. At the same time, the immigrants in Singapore have brought their own native rituals to the small island nation where the hungry-ghost month still thrives. A Month of Hungry Ghosts captures these rituals and performances throughout an entire seventh lunar month in Singapore.

== Production ==
The film is directed by Tony Kern and produced by Kern and Genevieve Woo. Mythopolis Pictures was the production studio. Work on the film began in 2005, during the Hungry Ghost Festival, with post production from December 2007 to July 2008.

=== Music ===
Taiwan-based artist MoShang blends recorded sound samples from the streets of Asia with downtempo electronica for a unique sound.

== Blog Aloud - Meet the Director and Producer ==
On 1 August 2008, the first day of the Hungry Ghost Festival, director Tony Kern and producer Genevieve Woo held a 15-minute interactive session on the film at Cinema Europa, Golden Village VivoCity, right after the screening. They shared about what went behind the making of the documentary and the strange happenings that they encountered.
