= List of Singaporean films of 2022 =

This is a list of films produced in Singapore ordered by release in 2022.

Date	Title	Director	Producer	Production Cost	Singapore Gross	Ref.
20 January 2022	Reunion Dinner	Ong Kuo Sin	Clover Films, iQIYI	$1.5 million	$843,223	
1 February 2022	Ah Girls Go Army	Jack Neo	J Team, mm2 Entertainment	$2 million	$2.26 million	
24 March 2022	Some Women (一些女人)	Quen Wong	Tiger Tiger Pictures		$11,601	
7 May 2022	Silence in the Dust (塵默呼吸)	Li Wei	Wild Grass Films, Catherine Dussart Productions			
2 June 2022	The Antique Shop	Suphakorn Riansuwan	One 31, LeayDoDee Studio, NoonTalk Media		$58,301	
16 June 2022	Ah Girls Go Army Again	Jack Neo	J Team, mm2 Entertainment		$873,703	
23 July 2022	#LookAtMe	Ken Kwek	Eko Pictures			
5 August 2022	Arnold Is a Model Student	Sorayos Prapapan	Minimal Animal, 185º Equator, Purin Pictures, Volya Films, Dibona Films, Giraffe Pictures, Cinematografica Films			
2 September 2022	Autobiography	Makbul Mubarak	KawanKawan Media, In Vivo Films, Potocol, Staron Film, Cinematografica Films, NiKo Film, FOCUSED equipment, Partisipasi Indonesia	$362,932		
15 September 2022	Deleted	Ken Ng Lai Huat	8028 Holdings, Artistes Marketing Asia		$191,584	
7 October 2022	Ajoomma	He Shuming	Giraffe Pictures, Rediance, Singapore Film Commission, Korean Film Council, Seoul Film Commission	US$650,000	$718,000	
8 October 2022	Baby Queen	Lei Yuan Bin	Tiger Tiger Pictures			
24 October 2022	Glorious Ashes	Bui Thac Chuyên	An Nam Productions, MAT Productions, Potocol			
2 November 2022	Geylang	Boi Kwong	mm2 Entertainment		$357,000	
26 November 2022	Before Life After Death	Anshul Tiwari	FilmsPositive, Nutzaboutme			
28 November 2022	Boom	Derrick Chew	Sight Lines Productions			
1 December 2022	Absent Smile (几时回来)	John Clang, Lavender Chang	Potocol			
20 December 2022	Trip to Lost Days (列车消失的那天)	Shen Ruilan	New Asian Filmmakers Collective			
