= List of Singaporean films of 2006 =

This is a list of films produced in Singapore ordered by release in 2006.

Date	Title	Director	Producer	Production Cost	Singapore Gross	Ref.
26 January 2006	I Not Stupid Too	Jack Neo	Raintree Pictures	$1.5 million	$4,180,987	
26 January 2006	Zodiac: The Race Begins	Edward Foo	Cubix International, Media Development Authority		$329,766	
March 2006	Smell of Rain	Gloria Chee	Smell of Rain Production		$4,396	
28 July 2006	Passabe	James Leong, Lynn Lee	Re:Think Entertainment			
24 April 2006	The Art of Flirting	Kan Lume	Kuantum Pictures			
25 May 2006	Love Story	Kelvin Tong	Focus Films/Boku Films	$850,000	$13,312	
June 2006	Unarmed Combat	Han Yew Kwang	Digital Media Academy, supported by Singapore Film Commission		$2,989	
June 2006	We Are Family	Clifton Ko Chi Sum & Lau Jian Hua (HK)	Spring Time Cinema (HK) / Impact Entertainment (HK) / MediaCorp Raintree Pictures		$83,844	
3 August 2006	S11	Gilbert Chan & Joshua Chiang	Digital Media Academy, supported by Singapore Film Commission		$3,018	
August 2006	The High Cost of Living	Leonard Lai Yok Wai	Digital Media Academy, supported by Singapore Film Commission		$877	
5 September 2006	The Missing Star (La Stella che non c'è)	Gianni Amelio	Cattleya (Italy) & Oak3 Films; Media Development Authority			
7 September 2006	Singapore Dreaming	Colin Goh/Yen Yen Wu	5C Films	$800,000	$452,586	
18 October 2006	Match Made	Mirabelle Ang				
25 November 2006	I Love Malaya	Chan Kah Mei, Christopher Len, Ho Choon Hiong, Eunice Lau, Wang Eng Eng	Asia Witness Production			
27 November 2006	Feet Unbound	Khee Jin Ng	Long March Films		$25,158.00	
December 2006	A Hero's Journey (also known as Where the Sun also Rises)	Grace Phan	Lux Lucis			
