= List of Singaporean films of 2002 =

This is a list of films produced in Singapore ordered by release in 2002.

Date	Title	Director	Producer	Production Cost	Singapore Gross	Ref.
2002	True Files	John D. Lamond	Apple Pie Productions			
9 February 2002	I Not Stupid	Jack Neo	Raintree Pictures	$1,000,000	$3,800,000	
March 2002	Dirty Laundry	Serene Leong	Temasek Hall, NUS	$30,000	$10,000	
March 2002	Angel Heart	Gerald Lee	Touch Entertainment	$1,100,000	NA	
22 May 2002	TalkingCock: The Movie	Colin Goh	Wu Liao Media	$150,000	$120,000	
27 June 2002	The Eye	Danny Pang/Oxide Pang	Raintree Pictures/Applause Pictures	US$2,500,000	$1,990,000	
September 2002	Nothing to Lose	Danny Pang	Raintree Pictures/Golden Network	$1,200,000	NA	
