= List of Singaporean films of 2001 =

This is a list of films produced in Singapore ordered by release in 2001.

Date	Title	Director	Producer	Production Cost	Singapore Gross	Ref.
18 January 2001	Miss Wonton	Meng Ong	DreamChamber Films	$700,000	$15,000	
26 April 2001	The Tree	Daisy Chan	Raintree Pictures	$1,100,000	$720,000	
28 June 2001	Voodoo Nightmare: Return to Pontianak	Djinn Ong	Vacant Films	$150,000	$140,000	
August 2001	A Sharp Pencil	Gallen Mei	Under Pressure Pictures	$189,000	$2,000	
13 August 2001	Hype	Vincent Wong	nuSTUDIOS, NUS	$19,000	NA	
14 November 2001	One Leg Kicking	Wei Koh/Eric Khoo	Zhao Wei Films/Raintree Pictures/Singapore Film Commission	$900,000	$716,000	
