= List of Singaporean films of 2016 =

This is a list of films produced in Singapore ordered by release in 2016.

Date	Title	Director	Producer	Production Cost	Singapore Gross	Ref.
4 February 2016	Long Long Time Ago	Jack Neo	J Team Productions, mm2 Entertainment	$2.5 million	$4.1 million	
5 February 2016	Let's Eat!	Chapman To	Asia Tropical Films, Clover Films		US$489,850	
14 February 2016	Muthar Kanave (First Dream)	N. Mohamed Yahssir	Millenia Motion Pictures, Vasantham			
14 February 2016	The Love Machine	Ler Jiyuan	birdmandog, Channel 5			
18 February 2016	A Lullaby to the Sorrowful Mystery	Lav Diaz	Ten17P, Epicmedia, Sine Olivia Pilipinas, Potocol, Akanga Film Asia			
14 March 2016	Wa-Cheew! Rise of A Kung-Fu Chef	Robert Tan	Weiyu Films, Okto			
19 March 2016	Spelling Armadillo 2	Zeng Ming Shan	Media Development Authority/Channel 5/Oak3 Films			
31 March 2016	The Faith of Anna Waters (also known as The Offering)	Kelvin Tong	Boku Films and PEP Pictures	US$5 million	$261,895	
31 March 2016	Long Long Time Ago 2	Jack Neo	J Team Productions, mm2 Entertainment	$2.5 million	$3 million	
30 April 2016	Baby Bumps	Wee Li Lin	Bobbing Buoy Films, Channel 5			
16 May 2016	Apprentice	Boo Junfeng	Akanga Film Asia, Peanut Pictures, Zhao Wei Films, augenschein Filmproduktion, Cinema Defacto, Making Film Productions and Sun Culture Entertainment		$270,306	
18 May 2016	A Yellow Bird	K Rajagopal	Akanga Film Asia, Acrobates Films	€400,000	$21,961	
26 May 2016	Young & Fabulous	Michael Woo, Joyce Lee	Encore Films, Golden Village Pictures, Singapore Film Commission and SIMF Management	$1.2 million	$1.3 million	
28 May 2016	Rise	Lee Thean-jeen	Weiyu Films, Channel 5			
5 July 2016	Rough Mix	Ying J. Tan	Monochrome Films	$300,000		
2 September 2016	Pularum Iniyum Naalekal (There's Always Tomorrow)	Shilpa Krishnan Shukla	Kathaah Productions			
8 September 2016	My Love Sinema	Tan Ai Leng	FLY Entertainment	$1.5 million	$109,363	
3 November 2016	Certified Dead	Marrie Lee	Reel Frenz Productions	$41,000		
24 November 2016	Lulu The Movie	Michelle Chong	Huat Films	$1.5 million	$2 million	
24 November 2016	Ariel & Olivia	Kan Lumé	Chapter Free			
25 November 2016	Siew Lup	Sam Loh	mm2 Entertainment	$800,000	$88,884	
26 November 2016	4Love (爱在小红点)	M. Raihan Halim, Gilbert Chan, Sam Loh, Daniel Yam	mm2 Entertainment		$25,778	
28 November 2016	I'm Coming Up	Min-Wei Ting	Min-Wei Ting			
2 December 2016	hUSh	Kan Lumé, Djenar Maesa Ayu	Chapter Free Productions			
3 December 2016	Flights through Darkness	Wong Kwang Han	Aporia Society			
