= Puey Quiñones =

Rodolfo "Puey" Quiñones Jr.
- Born: February 28, 1980 (age 46); Bobon, Northern Samar, Philippines
- Occupations: Creative Director, Puey Quiñones: Los Angeles
- Years active: 1995 - Present
- Website: www.pueyquinones.com

Rodolfo 'Puey' Quiñones Jr. (more commonly known as Puey Quiñones) is a Filipino fashion designer who alternates between Manila and Los Angeles, California. He is the featured designer mentor in the 2002 award-winning documentary The World's Most Fashionable Prison.

== Early life and education ==
Quiñones was born on February 28, 1980, in Bobon, Northern Samar. His father was a policeman, and his mother was a biology teacher. After three years of studying Political Science at the University of Eastern Philippines, he left the island of Samar to go to Manila.

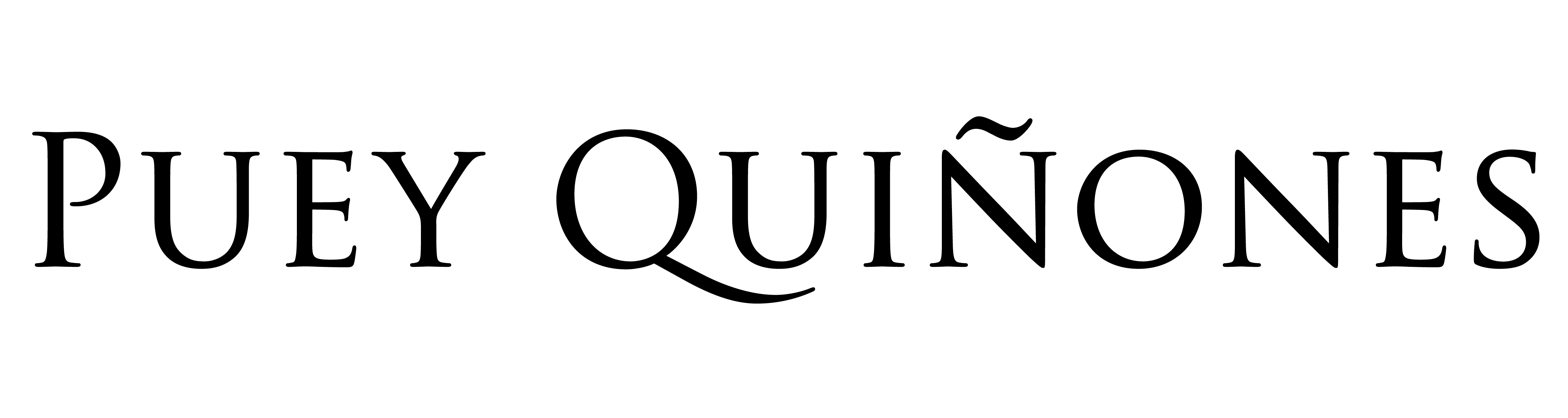
Personal Logo of Puey Quiñones

Quiñones' interest in fashion started in high school in Bobon. He was inspired by his neighbor Dennis Lustico, who became a successful fashion designer in Manila. Quiñones wanted to become a designer, too, but thought that would not be possible, “I thought that to become a designer, you must come from a rich family and study fashion design abroad.”

== Manila ==
In 1999, Quiñones moved to Manila as an all-around assistant at Lustico's atelier. During work hours, he sewed buttons and hems, but once everyone departed, he made sketches and left them on Lustico's desk. Lustico took notice, and under his mentorship, Quiñones learned the technical skills necessary for the job. Eventually, Lustico recommended him to Bergamo.

At Bergamo, Quiñones designed embroidery for the barong tagalog and new cuts for suits in Piña material, taking inspiration from the traditional Filipino suit.

His big break came in 2002 when he was a finalist at The Philippines Young Designers Competition for Paris. Through this competition, he met his first client, a Filipino politician TingTing Cojuangco.

In 2005, Quiñones opened an atelier in Bel Air Village in Makati, Philippines, and he organized his first solo show, Swell, where he presented a 30-piece collection made of Koryo silk (a local weave in the Philippines).

== Los Angeles ==
After a decade leading a design house in Manila, Quiñones relocated to Los Angeles, California. He was one of the featured designers for the J Summer Fashion Show, produced by Jessica Minh Ahn, held at One World Trade Center in New York City in June 2014.

In 2015, Quiñones became Creative Director for the global bridal brand, Cocomelody.

== Partnership ==
In 2018, Quiñones and partner Paul Martineau established Puey Quiñones, Los Angeles, in the designer's downtown atelier. They opened two showrooms in Bel-Air Village, Makati: the first for Quiñones’ eponymous fashion brand and the second for Cocomelody bridal wear.

In 2020, the Los Angeles County Museum of Art purchased a Quiñones mini-dress with pouf sleeves for its permanent collection.

== Works ==
Quiñones's designs have been featured in publications, television shows, movies, music videos, and red-carpet events.

- In June 2014, he presented a 15-piece collection for J Summer Fashion Show in New York City's One World Trade Center, entitled Fly.
- Quiñones was a guest designer for America's Next Top Model Cycle 21. He designed clothes using fabrics native to the Philippines for a runway challenge where the contestants had to walk on stilts.
- Designed one of Katy Perry's costumes for her Dark Horse (Katy Perry song) music video.
- In October 2017, after eight years, he did a solo fashion show for MEGA Fashion Week SS18 held in Manila, Philippines.
- He dressed HFPA member Janet Nepales and Filipino-American television host and journalist Janelle So-Perkins at the 75th Golden Globe Awards.
- ENews! correspondent and TV host Zuri Hall wore a pink silk taffeta dress by Quiñones to the Met Gala in 2019.

His creations have been worn by celebrities such as Destiny's Child member Michelle Williams (singer), Miss Universe 2012 Olivia Culpo, True Blood actress Rutina Wesley, fashion model and actress Ireland Baldwin, Fuller House actress Lori Loughlin, American rapper MC Lyte, among others.

Quiñones' client list includes the following as well:

- Boy Abunda, television host
- Kris Aquino, television host and actress
- Pops Fernandez, singer
- Imee Marcos, Ilocos Norte governor
- Gloria Macapagal Arroyo, 14th president of the Philippines
