= List of Singaporean films of 2003 =

This is a list of films produced in Singapore ordered by release in 2003.

Date	Title	Director	Producer	Production Cost	Singapore Gross	Ref.
January 2003	Song of the Stork	Jon Foo/Nguyen Phan Quang Binh	Mega Media	US$1,000,000	NA	
January 2003	e'TZAINTES	Tzang Merwyn Tong	INRI studio	NA	NA	
March 2003	City Sharks	Esan Sivalingam	HoodsInc Productions	$800,000	$40,000	
27 April 2003	15	Royston Tan	Zhao Wei Films	$200,000	$140,000	
July 2003	Twilight Kitchen	Gerald Lee	Gateway Entertainment	$250,000	NA	
7 August 2003	Homerun	Jack Neo	Raintree Pictures	$1,500,000	$2,350,000	
11 September 2003	Turn Left, Turn Right	Johnnie To/Wai Ka-Fai	MediaCorp Raintree Pictures/Milkyway Image	US$3,000,000	$1,058,000	
1 October 2003	Infernal Affairs II	Andrew Lau, Alan Mak	MediaCorp Raintree Pictures / Media Asia (HK)		$1,049,000	
22 November 2003	After School	Zhu Houren	National Crime Prevention Council	NA	NA	
