= Tony Kern =

American film director

- Born: Tony Kern; 1969 (age 56–57); Ohio, United States
- Occupations: Film director, Screenwriter, Motion-picture artist, Film producer
- Years active: 1996 – present

Tony Kern (born 1969) is a Singapore-based American film director, screenwriter, motion picture artist and film producer.

== Early life and education ==
Kern attended Gibsonburg High School in Ohio, United States, and graduated from the Bowling Green State University.

== Career ==
Kern began his career in film at Northwestern University as a video editor from 1996 to 2002. From 2003 to 2005, he worked as a producer and editor at AOL-Time Warner prior to setting up film-production company Mythopolis Pictures with Singaporean television news presenter Genevieve Woo. He also owns stock-footage company TK Time-Lapse, which features high-resolution royalty-free stock time-lapse footage.

Kern’s debut film A Month of Hungry Ghosts was released in Singapore on August 7, 2008. The feature film was nominated for Best Film at the inaugural Singapore Film Awards as part of the 22nd Singapore International Film Festival.

His second film, Afterimages, was released in Singapore on September 11, 2014. Co-produced by Genevieve Woo, the horror film is a compendium of five short films and received funding from the Media Development Authority's production assistance grant. In 2012, the film's script won the Network of Asian Fantastic Films award at a competition in Bucheon, South Korea. Afterimages was supported by crowdfunding and crowdsourcing. Reviewing the NC16 film in The Straits Times, critic John Lui gave it three-and-a-half stars, praising its special effects and writing that the film "has the courage of its own horror convictions", while the "good work is undermined by shaky acting from younger, more inexperienced cast members".

== Filmography ==
=== Filmography as director ===
==== Feature film ====
- A Month of Hungry Ghosts (2008)
- Afterimages (2014)

==== Short films ====
- The Mitre Spell (2007)
- Robot Man (2006)
- Dead Bitch Army
- Stay
- Steel Skies
- The Spooky Incident
- Like A Ghost
- Godzilla vs. Ameritech & Grandpa’s Truck
- Salvation Army Mural Occurrence

=== Other works ===
- Chasing Echo Music Sound Tracks
- Garage Kubrick – Sonic Wallpaper Scenes Music Sound Tracks
- Pan Music Sound Tracks
- El Nino Music Sound Tracks
- Plot Points of a Futuristic Urban Noir Music Sound Tracks
