= List of Singaporean films of 2000 =

This is a list of films produced in Singapore ordered by release in 2000.

Date	Title	Director	Producer	Production Cost	Singapore Gross	Ref.
3 February 2000	2000 AD	Gordon Chan	Raintree Pictures/Media Asia Films	$6,231,000	$910,698	
March 2000	Crazy People	Lin Ting	Wealth Film Production	$500,000	$35,061	
April 2000	Stamford Hall	Manoharan Ramakrishnan	Temasek Hall, NUS	$18,000	$3,500	
21 July 2000	Where The Money Is	Holly Goldberg Sloan	Max Stronghold Pictures Pte Ltd	$500,000	$50,000	
27 July 2000	Stories About Love	CheeK, Abdul Nizam, James Toh	Zhao Wei Films/Cyberflics	$300,000	$50,600	
16 November 2000	Chicken Rice War	CheeK	Raintree Pictures/Singapore Film Commission	$880,000	$400,000	
