= List of Singaporean films of 2012 =

This is a list of films produced in Singapore ordered by release in 2012.

Date	Title	Director	Producer	Production Cost	Singapore Gross	Ref.
19 January 2012	Dance Dance Dragon	Kat Goh	MediaCorp Raintree Pictures	$1.2 million	$1,338,430	
19 January 2012	We Not Naughty	Jack Neo	J Team Productions, mm2 Entertainment	$1 million	$2,146,280	
9 February 2012	The Wedding Diary	Adrian Teh	Clover Films, Golden Screen Cinemas, Mega Cineplex, Asia Tropical Films	$1 million	$451,436	
8 March 2012	Timeless Love	Dasmond Koh & Lim Koong Hwee	NoonTalk Media		$70,000	
17 May 2012	Ghost on Air	Cheng Ding An	Merelion Pictures	$1 million	$310,198	
22 June 2012	Hsien of the Dead	Gary Ow	Monkeywrench/Genetix S/Arte Associates			
August 2012	Liberta	Kan Lume	Kan Lume/Megan Wonowidjoyo			
16 August 2012	Greedy Ghost	Boris Boo	Galaxy Entertainment	$1 million	$585,000	
29 August 2012	Imperfect	Steve Cheng	Corner Stone Pictures, MM2 Entertainment, Clover Films		$577,289	
30 August 2012	My Ghost Partner	Huang Yiliang	Red Group Studio	$800,000	$24,833	
1 September 2012	Bait 3D	Kimble Rendall	Arclight Films, Story Bridge Films, Pictures in Paradise, Blackmagic Design, Media Development Authority	$34,368,468	$187,456	
20 September 2012	My Dog Dou Dou	Ng Say Yong	MM2 Entertainment, Clover Films, Homerun Asia, Singapore Film Commission	$1.2 million	$102,623	
27 September 2012	Dead Mine	Steven Sheil	Infinite Frameworks		$30,618	
5 October 2012	Sex.Violence.FamilyValues	Ken Kwek	Ken Kwek/The Butter Factory		$40,000	
November 2012	Innocents	Chen-Hsi Wong	Chen-Hsi Wong	$200,000		
8 November 2012	Ah Boys to Men	Jack Neo	J Team Productions, Clover Films, MM2 Entertainment, Neo-Film, Sky Films, StarHub, Vividthree Productions	$1.5 million	$6.03 million	
15 December 2012	Old Romances (老情人)	Royston Tan, Eva Tang, Victric Thng	Chuan Pictures			
