= List of Singaporean films of 2021 =

This is a list of films produced in Singapore ordered by release in 2021.

Date	Title	Director	Producer	Production Cost	Singapore Gross	Ref.
11 February 2021	The Diam Diam Era Two	Jack Neo	J Team, mm2 Entertainment		$2 million	
23 March 2021	Malam	Leonard Yip	M'GO Films			
22 April 2021	Taste	Lê Bảo	Le Bien Pictures, E&W Films, Deuxieme Ligne Films, Petit Film, Cinema 22, Senator Film Produktion, Effortless Work			
7 July 2021	Rehana Maryam Noor	Abdullah Mohammad Saad	Potocol, Metro Video			
24 July 2021	ABSTRACTIONS: Filmic Readings of the Something New Must Turn Up Exhibition	Ryan Benjamin Lee, Chew Chia Shao Min, Toh Hun Ping, Russell Morton, Chong Lii, and Gladys Ng and Ng Hui Hsien	National Gallery Singapore			
8 August 2021	Vengeance Is Mine, All Others Pay Cash	Edwin	Palari Films, Phoenix Films, E&W Films, Match Factory Productions, Bombero International, Kaninga Pictures			
10 September 2021	Anatomy of Time	Jakrawal Nilthamrong	Diversion, Sluizer Film Productions, Mit Out Sound Films, M'GO Films, Damned Films			
13 September 2021	Yuni	Kamila Andini	Fourcolours Films, Akanga Film Asia, Manny Films			
10 October 2021	24	Royston Tan	Chuan Pictures			
28 October 2021	Late Night Ride (开夜车)	Koh Chong Wu	Clover Films, mm2 Entertainment			
28 November 2021	Scene UnSeen	Abdul Nizam and Friends	M'GO Films			
