= Genevieve Woo =

Singaporean journalist (born 1969)

Genevieve Woo Marn Huong 胡曼虹
- Born: 3 August 1969 (age 57); Singapore
- Education: National University of Singapore
- Occupations: Newsreader; broadcast journalist; film producer; jewellery designer
- Notable credit(s): Singapore Tonight presenter and producer (2008–2009); East Asia Tonight presenter and producer (2009–2011); Asia Business Tonight presenter and producer (2012–2013); Singapore Tonight presenter and producer (2013–2014; 2025–present); News Tonight presenter (2015–present); Asia Now presenter and producer (2015–present)

Genevieve Woo Marn Huong (Chinese: 胡曼虹; pinyin: Hú Mànhóng; born 3 August 1969) is a Singaporean television journalist and news presenter with Mediacorp.

== Early life and education ==
Woo attended Marymount Convent School and Raffles Junior College in Singapore. She read English language and literature at the National University of Singapore.

== Career ==
Woo has wide-ranging experience in the media and communications industry, where she has worked in a variety of roles.

After graduating from university, Woo started out as a copywriter in advertising before turning to print journalism. In 1999, she joined Parkway Holdings where she managed corporate communications. She returned to journalism in 2003, serving for a year as an assistant editor at TODAY, a free English-language tabloid in Singapore.

In 2004, she crossed over to parent company MediaCorp and served as its vice-president of corporate communications before joining Channel NewsAsia in 2007.

During her time with Channel NewsAsia, she fronted the channel's highly rated news programme Singapore Tonight, which airs daily between 10:00 pm and 10:30 pm (Singapore/Hong Kong time). In addition, she fronted Cents & Sensibilities, a weekly current affairs show on how the person in the street should make investments. Woo was previously a presenter on Asia Business Tonight, East Asia Tonight, Asia Today and World Today.

She left Channel NewsAsia in 2014 and joined Hyflux, a Singaporean company specialising in water engineering on 2 April 2014, as the Senior Vice President, Corporate Marketing and Communications.

Woo is also a member of the executive committee of the Guild of Jewellery Professionals and Artisans (GJPA), a not-for-profit society with headquarters in Singapore.

In 2015, Woo rejoined Mediacorp and currently presents News Tonight on Mediacorp Channel 5 as of 2025.

=== Film-making ===
In 2006, Woo set up film-production company Mythopolis Pictures with Singapore-based American film director Tony Kern.

In 2007, Woo co-produced a short film called The Mitre Spell, which weaves a whimsy tale around the mysteriously spooky, colonial-era Mitre Hotel off Killiney Road in Singapore. The film premiered at the 2007 Singapore International Film Festival. The Mitre Spell was short-listed for The Best of First Take 2008, a special screening of audience favourites of each month, organised by The Substation.

Another film, A Month of Hungry Ghosts, which Woo and Kern co-produced, made its debut in local cinemas on 7 August 2008. The feature film captures the rituals and performances throughout an entire seventh-lunar-month Hungry Ghost Festival in Singapore. A Month of Hungry Ghosts was nominated for Best Film at the inaugural Singapore Film Awards at the 22nd Singapore International Film Festival.

=== Jewellery designing ===
Woo owns Vintage Bunny, an online jewellery store specialising in modern handmade and authentic vintage jewellery, created using natural stones, pearls, Balinese silver and Austrian crystals.
