= List of Singaporean films of 2007 =

This is a list of films produced in Singapore ordered by release in 2007.

Date	Title	Director	Producer	Production Cost	Singapore Gross	Ref.
11 January 2007	One Last Dance	Max Makowski	Ming Productions / MediaCorp Raintree Pictures	US$2,000,000	$459,000	
February 2007	Protégé	Derek Yee	Peter Chan / MediaCorp Raintree Pictures	US$6,000,000	$1,658,000	
15 February 2007	Just Follow Law	Jack Neo	J-Team Productions / Innoform Media	$1,200,000	$2,777,400	
March 2007	Aki Ra's Boys	James Leong, Lynn Lee	Lianain Films			
25 March 2007	The Kallang Wave	Yanfeng Lee/Hanafi Ramdan	Zayed bin Abdul Aziz Talib/Mohamed Fairil bin Sugang	$100,000	$3,500	
26 March 2007	Pink Paddlers	Jasmine Ng	Green Mango Productions			
April 2007	F.	Chew Tze Chuan				
April 2007	Solos	Kan Lume, Zihan Loo	Red Dawn Productions			
23 May 2007	Pleasure Factory	Ekachai Uekrongtham	Spicy Apple Films/Fortissimo Films		$196,673.00	
June 2007	The Tattooist	Peter Burger	Eyeworks Touchdown Films/MediaCorp Raintree Pictures	NZ$5,600,000	$285,000	
6 June 2007	Men in White	Kelvin Tong	Boku Films/Innoform Media	$500,000	$500,315	
7 June 2007	Legend of the Sea	Benjamin Toh	Axxis Group, Media Development Authority		$125,209	
19 July 2007	Invisible City	Tan Pin Pin	Tan Pin Pin, Institute of Southeast Asian Studies, Institute of Policy Studies, supported by Singapore Film Commission, Asian Network of Documentary (Pusan International Film Festival), Mindwasabi, Naresh Mahtani			
26 July 2007	Gone Shopping	Wee Li Lin	Bobbing Buoy Films	$$650,000	$28,067	
August 2007	Becoming Royston	Nicholas Chee	Originasian Pictures		$3,608.00	
9 August 2007	881	Royston Tan	Mediacorp Raintree Pictures	$1,000,000	$3,540,000	
30 August 2007	The Home Song Stories	Tony Ayres	Raintree Pictures	A$5,500,000	$120,000	
September 2007	Remember Chek Jawa	Eric Lim				
October 2007	Truth Be Told	Teo Eng Tiong	Pilgrim Pictures	$500,000	$23,000	
November 2007	Anna & Anna	Aubrey Lam	Ng Sian Ngoh	US$2,000,000	$30,000	
9 November 2007	18 Grams of Love	Han Yew Kwang	18g Pictures, Media Development Authority			
December 2007	Boomtown Beijing	Tan Siok Siok				
