= List of Singaporean films of 2009 =

This is a list of films produced in Singapore ordered by release in 2009.

Date	Title	Director	Producer	Production Cost	Singapore Gross	Ref.
22 January 2009	Love Matters	Jack Neo, Gilbert Chan	Neo Studios		$1,676,948.98	
23 January 2009	The Wedding Game	Ekachai Uekrongtham	MediaCorp Raintree Pictures, Scorpio East Pictures, Double Vision Malaysia, Speedy Productions	$1.5 million	$1,692,663.92	
March 2009	Flooding in the time of Drought	Sherman Ong	Paddy Pictures and 13 Little Pictures			
29 March 2009	White Days	Looi Wan Ping	13 Little Pictures			
April 2009	Brother No. 2	Jason Lai	Oak3 Films, Asia Witness Production & fact + Fiction GmbH, Media Development Authority			
April 2009	Female Games	Kan Lume	Kan Lume			
April 2009	This Too Shall Pass	Ang Aik Heng	360 Productions			
April 2009	A Big Road	Alec Tok	One Kind Pictures			
20 May 2009	Here	Ho Tzu Nyen	gsmprjctmedia, Akanga Film Asia, Oak3 Films, Singapore Film Commission		$6,894	
20 July 2009	Macabre	The Mo Brothers	Gorylah Pictures, Merah Production, Guerilla Visuals, Nation Pictures, MediaCorp Raintree Pictures			
13 August 2009	Where Got Ghost?	Jack Neo, Boris Boo	Neo Studios		$2,499,412.15	
13 August 2009	The Insomniac	Madhav Mathur	Bad Alliteration Films			
September 2009	In the House of Straw	Yeo Siew Hua	13 Little Pictures			
8 September 2009	Autumn in March	Huang Yiliang	Red Group Film	$1 million		
10 September 2009	Blood Ties	Chai Yee Wei	Hot Cider Films, Oak3 Films, Singapore Film Commission		$261,001.87	
13 October 2009	The Blue Mansion	Glen Goei	Tiger Tiger Pictures	$2.8 million	$192,492	
