= John Clang =

Singaporean photographer (born 1973)

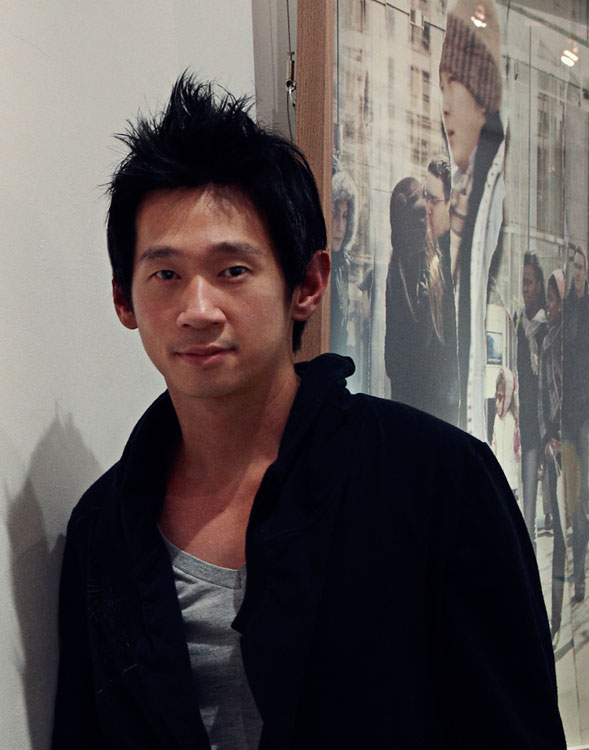
- Clang in 2010
- Born: Ang Choon Leng; 1973 (age 52–53); Singapore
- Education: LASALLE College of the Arts
- Known for: Photography, visual arts
- Website: www.johnclang.com

John Clang, born Ang Choon Leng (Chinese: 汪春龙; pinyin: Wāng Chūnlóng), is a Singaporean visual artist whose work encompasses photography, film, and metaphysical performance. His practice explores themes of time, identity, interiority, and diaspora, often blurring the line between documentation and conceptual inquiry.

Clang’s work has been exhibited at art institutions and major platforms including the Centre for Contemporary Culture Strozzina (Italy),Deichtorhallen Hamburg (Germany), the National Museum of Singapore, the Pera Museum (Turkey), the Singapore Art Museum, and Sharjah Biennial

He divides his time between Singapore and New York.

== Early years ==
Clang was born Ang Choon Leng (汪春龙) in Singapore. He earned his nickname while in National Service in Singapore as his badge read "C L Ang". At the age of 17, he enrolled in Lasalle College of the Arts in Singapore to study fine arts but left after six months to assist the fine-art photographer Chua Soo Bin, who received the Cultural Medallion in 1988.

== Work ==
Time (2009) is a series that involves recording a location, to show the passing of time in a montage style.

Being Together (2010–2012) is a series of family portraits using Skype VoIP (voice over Internet Protocol) technology to do live recording of family members and project them across continents.

Clang started on the series by photographing his own family in 2010. From 2010 to 2012, he located Singaporeans around the world and travelled to cities such as London, Paris, Hong Kong, Shanghai, Los Angeles and Seattle to photograph them with their families in Singapore. These 40 family portraits were part of a showcase of over 90 works by Clang exhibited at the National Museum of Singapore in January 2013, together with more than 40 historical family portraits from the museum's collection.

The Land of My Heart (2014) is a series of work which re-appropriates the icon of the Singapore Girl, Singapore Airlines' air stewardess, to contemplate vestiges of identity and personal memories encapsulated in nostalgic spaces of a rapidly evolving motherland.

Reading by an Artist (2023–ongoing) is a participatory performance series that reimagines portraiture through metaphysical dialogue. Evolving from his earlier interest in technological intimacy, the project uses the ancient Chinese divination system Ziwei doushu to create portraits through conversation and self-reflection, rather than photography.

The work has been presented at art venues including Objectifs and FOST Gallery in Singapore, the National Gallery Singapore, and Sharjah Biennial in the United Arab Emirates.

In 2025, Clang was listed by Artnet as one of "5 Artists to Know" in their article on Sharjah Biennial 16.

=== Films ===
In 2018, his first feature film, Their Remaining Journey, had its world premiere at the International Film Festival Rotterdam, and was nominated for the Bright Future Award. It was also the opening film for Painting with Light: Festival of International Films on Art at National Gallery Singapore.

Clang's second feature, A Love Unknown (2020), also screened at the International Film Festival Rotterdam. It was selected as the opening film for the Singapore International Festival of Arts. However, the screening was cancelled due to the COVID-19 pandemic.

His third feature, Absent Smile, co-directed with Lavender Chang, was presented at the 33rd Singapore International Film Festival in 2022.

== Exhibitions ==
=== Selected solo exhibitions ===
- 2001 Backs, DVF studio, New York City
- 2003 They Were in Color: 4 June 2001 – 27 January 2002, Galerie Colette, Paris, France
- 2003 Fear of Losing the Existence, Bank Art Gallery, Los Angeles, USA
- 2004 Clang. A Self Portrait, Jendela Gallery/The Esplanade, Singapore
- 2007 Clang: A White Book, The Substation, Singapore
- 2010 Con(Front), 2902 Gallery, Singapore
- 2012 John Clang: Self Reflection, Pékin Fine Arts, Beijing, China
- 2013 Being Together: Family & Portraits – Photographing with John Clang, National Museum of Singapore, Singapore
- 2013 When I say you are dreaming, so am I, 2902 Gallery, Art Stage Singapore, Singapore
- 2014 (Re)Contextualizing My Mind, Pékin Fine Arts, Hong Kong.
- 2016 The World Surrounding an Indoor Plant, FOST Gallery, Gillman Barracks, Singapore
- 2023 So this is what it feels like to be free, FOST Gallery, Gillman Barracks, Singapore

=== Selected group exhibitions ===
- 1993 Critical Framework, 5th Passage Gallery, Singapore
- 2002 Porn?, Proud Galleries, London, UK
- 2002 Fascination, Singapore Art Museum, Singapore
- 2009 (super)natural, The Tobacco Warehouse, Brooklyn, New York City
- 2009 TransportAsian, Singapore Art Museum, Singapore
- 2010 HIDEntities, mc2gallery, Milan, Italy
- 2011 The Open Daybook Exhibition, Los Angeles Contemporary Exhibitions (LACE), Los Angeles, USA
- 2011 What's Next 30 x 30 Creative Exhibition, The OCT Art & Design Gallery, Shenzhen, China
- 2011 What's Next 30 x 30 Creative Exhibition, ArtisTree, Hong Kong
- 2012 The 2011 Sovereign Asian Art Prize, The Sands Expo and Convention Center, Singapore
- 2012 Paper Moon, KSU Art Museum, Kennesaw, USA
- 2012 Venti d'Oriente, mc2gallery, Milan, Italy
- 2014 Family Matters, Centre for Contemporary Culture Strozzina, Florence, Italy
- 2014 Anthropos New York, Sundaram Tagore, New York City
- 2014 Afterimage: Contemporary Photography from Southeast Asia, Singapore Art Museum, Singapore
- 2014 Asuntos domésticos, Sala exposiciones Diputación de Huesca, Spain
- 2014 War Room, Pékin Fine Arts Hong Kong
- 2017 The Poetics of Absence, 1X1 Art Gallery, Dubai
- 2018 Singapore Unseen, Pera Museum, Istanbul

== Awards ==
On 19 November 2010, John Clang became the first photographer in Singapore to receive the Designer of the Year award at the annual President's Design Award.
