= We Not Naughty =

2012 film by Jack Neo

- Directed by: Jack Neo
- Written by: Jack Neo; Ho Hee Ann; Sun Lin
- Produced by: Jack Neo; Melvin Ang; Boi Kwong; Kent Chan
- Starring: Shawn Lee; Joshua Ang; Daniel Chan; Cherry Hsia; Dawn Gan; Xiang Yun; Jacky Chin; Ivan Lo Kai Jun; Cheryl Yeo; Amos Yee; Roy Li; Eric Moo
- Cinematography: Chiu Wai Yin
- Edited by: Yim Mun Chong
- Music by: Zheng Kai Hua
- Production company: J Team Productions
- Distributed by: Golden Village; Clover Films
- Release date: 19 January 2012; (Singapore)
- Running time: 137 minutes
- Country: Singapore
- Languages: Mandarin; English; Hokkien
- Budget: S$1 million
- Box office: S$2.2 million US$1,716,930

We Not Naughty (simplified Chinese: 孩子不坏; traditional Chinese: 孩子不壞) is a 2012 comedy film directed by Jack Neo. It was officially released on 19 January 2012 in Singapore. It is also a spin-off to I Not Stupid, I Not Stupid Too, the I Not Stupid Too TV series and Homerun.

== Plot ==
Chen Weijie (Shawn Lee) and Damien Liu Jianren (Joshua Ang) are two ITP (Abbreviation for International Technological Polytechnic) students who are constantly put down for being "dumb" despite the fact that they display a talent for designing and creating gadgets, which placed the both of them in the Design and Technology, Science Technology Engineering and Mathematics and Electrical and Electronics Engineering course. Damien comes from a wealthy single-parent home and is estranged from his mother Cynthia Phua (Dawn Gan) and younger brother Amos Liu (Amos Yee), a fluent English speaker. He joins the local street gang of loan sharks and got the opportunity to work with the loan shark, gangster and crime boss in charge named Ah Qiang (Roy Li) and becomes a loan shark runner, which he then brings Weijie in with him later on and work together as loan shark runners, by helping the loan sharks to spray paint, splash paint and write threats. Weijie's father Mr. Chen (Jacky Chin) is a taxi driver and compulsive gambler who frequently swings from loving husband and father to crazed gambler running away from loan sharks (One of the loan shark portrayed by Tony Koh Beng Hoe). To complicate matters, his younger sister Nicole Chen (Cheryl Yeo) is academically gifted in her studies in secondary school and pampered by their mother, Mrs. Chen (Xiang Yun), thus causing frequent quarrels and misunderstanding amongst them. Unknown to the rest of them, Nicole becomes involved in a serious cyberbullying case and later becomes a victim of bullying herself.

One day, Mr Liew CK (Daniel Chan) is announced as Weijie and Damien's new form teacher and also the subject teacher for the Design and Technology, Science Technology Engineering and Mathematics and Electrical and Electronics Engineering course. The young and energetic Liew CK tries hard to connect with the group but they fail to respond. He challenges them to compete in a radio-controlled helicopter race and if he loses, he will do a run of ITP in the nude. The students defeat him and he honours his promise. The story and the controversy it caused made the national news. However, he had earned his students' respect and they responded accordingly when interviewed by the press conference. As a result, the board of directors and the school principal ultimately decided that he could still continue teaching the Design and Technology, Science Technology Engineering and Mathematics and Electrical and Electronics Engineering course and would not be fired from ITP.

Unfortunately, one of Weijie and Damien's "inventions" falls into the hands of criminals by the street gang of loan sharks headed by Ah Qiang and street gang's leader named Boss Ma (Eric Moo), who is a crime boss, drug lord, loan shark and gangster. This made Weijie, Damien, Liew CK, Liew CK's Wife Mrs. Liew (Cherry Hsia) and Cynthia Phua to travel to Johor Bahru, where Weijie and Damien are tasked to use the invention to carry S$1,000,000 (which are actually drugs) by a few of their former gang members who eventually betrayed and swindled Weijie and Damien including Ah Qiang, which was being tasked by Boss Ma to lure Weijie and Damien into a trap. The invention was close to crossing the Singapore-Malaysia border when Liew CK took control. Soon, Boss Ma, Ah Qiang and the gang members fought with Weijie, Damien, Liew CK and Cynthia Phua. Cynthia asked both Weijie and Damien to escape while she suffers from an injury. Weijie and Damien encounters Mrs. Liew, who is about to give birth. Whilst Weijie and Damien are trying to help her give birth, they realised on what they have done wrong towards their parents. Soon after Mrs. Liew gave birth to a healthy baby, Weijie and Damien are tasked to assist the Royal Malaysia Police Officers out using their invention to arrest Boss Ma, Ah Qiang and the other gang members of the street gang. Once the gang members are arrested by the Royal Malaysia Police, Liew CK, Mrs. Liew and Cynthia Phua are admitted to the hospital whereas Weijie and Damien thanked the latter for saving both of the good friends' lives.

Once again, Liew CK had hit the headline news again and is proclaimed as a national hero, along with Weijie and Damien as well when they assisted the Royal Malaysia Police officers in arresting Boss Ma, Ah Qiang and the gang members. It is then revealed that Weijie and Damien became winners of a national science creativity and innovation competition, for their creativity, innovation and invention of their radio-controlled helicopter, and they were both awarded another trophy and award for their recognition by the Singapore Police Force.

== Cast ==
- Shawn Lee as Chen Weijie
- Joshua Ang as Damien Liu Jianren
- Daniel Chan as Mr. Liew CK
- Cherry Hsia as Mrs. Liew, Liew CK's wife
- Dawn Gan as Cynthia Phua, Damien's mother
- Xiang Yun as Mrs. Chen, Weijie's mother
- Jacky Chin as Mr. Chen, Weijie's father
- Ivan Lo Kai Jun as Chen Ah Bao, Weijie's younger brother
- Cheryl Yeo as Nicole Chen, Weijie's younger sister
- Roy Li as Ah Qiang, a loan shark, gangster and crime boss in charge of Weijie and Damien who eventually betrays them with respect of Boss Ma (Eric Moo).
- Eric Moo as Boss Ma, a crime boss, drug lord, loan shark and gangster.
- Ashley Leong as Alvin, an International Technical Polytechnic (ITP) Student and one of Weijie and Damien's classmate for the Design and Technology and Electrical and Electronics Engineering course.
- Natalli Ong Ai Wen as Natalie, International Technical Polytechnic (ITP) Student and one of Weijie and Damien's classmate Design and Technology and Electrical and Electronics Engineering course.
- Tony Koh Beng Hoe as a loan shark targeting Weijie's father Mr. Chen to repay his debts.

== Themes ==
The film examines the problems faced by parents with their rebellious children in Singapore's current society. Other themes in the film include cyberbullying, peer pressure, gangsterism, morality, juvenile delinquency and teacher-student relationships. A prominent theme relevant to Singaporean society is the social stigma about polytechnic students.
