= List of highest-grossing films in Singapore =

Below is a list of the all-time top-grossing films in Singapore:

== Top-grossing films of all time ==
The highest-grossing films in Singapore, by box office gross revenue, as of 2024.

Rank	Title	Lifetime Gross	Year
1	Avengers: Endgame	S$18.27 mil	2019
2	Avengers: Infinity War	S$15.16 mil	2018
3	Spider-Man: No Way Home	S$13.17 mil	2021
4	The Avengers	S$12.92 mil	2012
5	Avengers: Age of Ultron	S$12.19 mil	2015

=== Top-grossing Chinese-language films of all time ===
The highest-grossing Chinese-language films in Singapore, as of 2024.

Rank	Title	Lifetime Gross	Country	Year
1	Ah Boys to Men 2	S$7.90 mil	Singapore	2013
2	Ip Man 3	S$7.65 mil	Hong Kong	2015
3	Ah Boys to Men 3: Frogmen	S$7.62 mil	Singapore	2015
4	Ip Man 4: The Finale	S$7.60 mil	Hong Kong	2019
5	Ah Boys to Men	S$6.22 mil	Singapore	2012
6	Money No Enough	S$6.02 mil	Singapore	1998
7	Ah Boys to Men 4	S$5.05 mil	Singapore	2017
8	CZ12	S$5.00 mil	Hong Kong	2012
9	Money No Enough 3	S$4.89 mil	Singapore	2024
10	Money No Enough 2	S$4.87 mil	Singapore	2008

== Top grossing films in the 2000s ==
=== Top-grossing films in 2003 ===
Rank	Title	Distributor	Gross	Language
1	The Lord of the Rings: The Return of the King	New Line Cinema	$4.45m	English
2	Finding Nemo	Walt Disney Pictures	$4.21m	English
3	X2	20th Century Fox	$3.82m	English
4	The Matrix Reloaded	Warner Bros. Pictures	$3.81m	English
5	Shanghai Knights	Walt Disney Pictures	$3.004m	English
6	The Matrix Revolutions	Warner Bros. Pictures	$3.00m	English
7	Bruce Almighty	United International Pictures	$2.94m	English
8	Charlie's Angels: Full Throttle	Sony Pictures	$2.39m	English
9	Terminator 3: Rise of the Machines	Warner Bros. Pictures	$2.37m	English
10	Homerun	Raintree Pictures	$2.35m	Chinese

=== Top-grossing films in 2004 ===
Figures are as at 31 December 2004, with The Incredibles and Kung Fu Hustle were still being screened at that time.

Rank	Title	Distributor	Gross	Language
1	Spider-Man 2	Sony Pictures	$5.25m	English
2	Harry Potter and the Prisoner of Azkaban	Warner Bros. Pictures	$4.57m	English
3	The Incredibles	United International Pictures	$3.67m	English
4	The Day After Tomorrow	20th Century Fox	$3.13m	English
5	Kung Fu Hustle	Columbia Pictures	$2.96m	Chinese
6	Shrek 2	DreamWorks SKG	$2.88m	English
7	Troy	Warner Bros. Pictures	$2.84m	English
8	The Best Bet	Raintree Pictures	$2.53m	Chinese
9	The Passion of the Christ	Icon Entertainment	$2.41m	English
10	Van Helsing	United International Pictures	$2.39m	English

=== Top-grossing films in 2005 ===
Figures are as at 31 December 2005, with Harry Potter and the Goblet of Fire and King Kong were still being screened at that time.

Rank	Title	Distributor	Gross	Language
1	Harry Potter and the Goblet of Fire	Warner Bros. Pictures	$5.8m	English
2	King Kong	United International Pictures	$4.8m	English
3	Star Wars: Episode III – Revenge of the Sith	20th Century Fox	$4.1m	English
4	The Chronicles of Narnia: The Lion, the Witch and the Wardrobe	Walt Disney Pictures	$4.1m	English
5	Madagascar	DreamWorks SKG	$3.6m	English
6	War of the Worlds	United International Pictures	$3.2m	English
7	Fantastic Four	20th Century Fox	$2.97m	English
8	Batman Begins	Warner Bros. Pictures	$2.8m	English
9	Constantine	Warner Bros. Pictures	$2.8m	English
10	Mr. & Mrs. Smith	20th Century Fox	$2.6m	English

=== Top-grossing films in 2006 ===
Figures are as at 30 December 2006, with Casino Royale and Happy Feet were still being screened at that time.

Rank	Title	Distributor	Gross	Language
1	X-Men: The Last Stand	20th Century Fox	$4.8m	English
2	Pirates of the Caribbean: Dead Man's Chest	Walt Disney Pictures	$4.5m	English
3	I Not Stupid 2	Raintree Pictures	$4.18m	Chinese
4	Mission: Impossible III	United International Pictures	$4.15m	English
5	Superman Returns	Warner Bros. Pictures	$3.8m	English
6	The Da Vinci Code	Columbia Pictures	$3.18m	English
7	Casino Royale	Sony Pictures	$3.15m	English
8	Fearless	United International Pictures	$3.11m	Chinese
9	Happy Feet	Warner Bros. Pictures	$2.8m	English
10	Ice Age 2: The Meltdown	20th Century Fox	$2.55m	English

=== Top-grossing films in 2007 ===
All figures provided are from Box Office Mojo in US dollars. (Figures are accurate as of 19 August 2023)

Rank	Title	Distributor	Gross	Language
1	Transformers	Paramount Pictures	$4,654,481	English
2	Spider-Man 3	Sony Pictures	$4,191,368	English
3	Harry Potter and the Order of the Phoenix	Warner Bros. Pictures	$3,701,795	English
4	Pirates of the Caribbean: At World's End	Walt Disney Studios Motion Pictures	$3,402,148	English
5	Ratatouille	Walt Disney Studios Motion Pictures	$2,940,855	English
6	Fantastic Four: Rise of the Silver Surfer	20th Century Fox	$2,493,746	English
7	Rush Hour 3	New Line Cinema	$2,416,166	English
8	Shrek the Third	Paramount Pictures	$2,327,810	English
9	Enchanted	Walt Disney Studios Motion Pictures	$2,057,637	English
10	The Golden Compass	New Line Cinema	$1,966,641	English

=== Top-grossing films in 2008 ===
All figures provided are from Box Office Mojo in US dollars. (Figures are accurate as of 2 October 2018)

Rank	Title	Distributor	Gross	Language
1	Kung Fu Panda	DreamWorks SKG	$4,307,978	English
2	Iron Man	Paramount Pictures	$3,823,968	English
3	The Dark Knight	Warner Bros. Pictures	$3,637,103	English
4	Money No Enough 2	Raintree Pictures	$3,389,709	Chinese
5	The Mummy: Tomb of the Dragon Emperor	United International Pictures	$3,014,365	English
6	Indiana Jones and the Kingdom of the Crystal Skull	Paramount Pictures	$2,767,630	English
7	Madagascar: Escape 2 Africa	DreamWorks SKG	$2,755,573	English
8	Quantum of Solace	Sony Pictures	$2,477,339	English
9	The Forbidden Kingdom	Lionsgate Films	$2,452,436	English
10	CJ7	Columbia Pictures	$2,202,941	Chinese

=== Top-grossing films in 2009 ===
All figures provided are from Box Office Mojo in US dollars. (Figures are accurate as of 2 October 2018)

Rank	Title	Distributor	Gross	Language
1	Avatar	20th Century Fox	$8,112,994	English
2	Transformers: Revenge of the Fallen	United International Pictures	$5,834,711	English
3	2012	Sony Pictures	$4,645,078	English
4	Harry Potter and the Half-Blood Prince	Warner Bros. Pictures	$3,474,126	English
5	Night at the Museum: Battle of the Smithsonian	20th Century Fox	$3,005,252	English
6	Up	Walt Disney Pictures	$2,864,063	English
7	Ice Age 3: Dawn of the Dinosaurs	20th Century Fox	$2,730,040	English
8	X-Men Origins: Wolverine	20th Century Fox	$2,559,609	English
9	G.I. Joe	United International Pictures	$2,505,428	English
10	Alvin and the Chipmunks: The Squeakquel	20th Century Fox	$2,370,286	English

== Top grossing films in the 2010s ==
=== Top-grossing films in 2010 ===
All figures provided are from Box Office Mojo in US dollars. (Figures are accurate as of 2 October 2018)

Rank	Title	Distributor	Gross	Language
1	Harry Potter and the Deathly Hallows (Part One)	Warner Bros. Pictures	$4,546,240	English
2	Iron Man 2	United International Pictures	$4,194,650	English
3	Inception	Warner Bros. Pictures	$4,089,506	English
4	Clash of the Titans	Warner Bros. Pictures	$3,945,289	English
5	The Karate Kid	Sony Pictures	$3,345,747	English
6	Alice in Wonderland	Walt Disney Pictures	$3,319,768	English
7	Ip Man 2	Cathay Organisation	$3,291,610	Chinese
8	Toy Story 3	Walt Disney Pictures	$3,155,072	English
9	Tangled	Walt Disney Pictures	$3,031,106	English
10	Shrek Forever After	United International Pictures	$3,019,917	English

=== Top-grossing films in 2011 ===
All figures provided are from Box Office Mojo in US dollars. (Figures are accurate as of 2 October 2018)

Rank	Title	Distributor	Gross	Language
1	Transformers 3	United International Pictures	$9,181,891	English
2	Kung Fu Panda 2	United International Pictures	$7,416,602	English
3	Harry Potter and the Deathly Hallows (Part Two)	Warner Bros. Pictures	$6,522,416	English
4	Mission: Impossible – Ghost Protocol	United International Pictures	$5,037,487	English
5	Johnny English Reborn	United International Pictures	$4,597,349	English
6	X-Men: First Class	20th Century Fox	$4,547,291	English
7	Thor	United International Pictures	$4,250,375	English
8	Pirates of the Caribbean: On Stranger Tides	Walt Disney Pictures	$4,087,668	English
9	Captain America: The First Avenger	United International Pictures	$3,556,722	English
10	Fast Five	United International Pictures	$3,514,117	English

=== Top-grossing films in 2012 ===
All figures provided are from Box Office Mojo in US dollars. (Figures are accurate as of 22 May 2018)

Rank	Title	Distributor	Gross	Language
1	The Avengers	Walt Disney Pictures	$11,172,253	English
2	The Dark Knight Rises	Warner Bros. Pictures	$7,023,329	English
3	The Amazing Spider-Man	Sony Pictures Entertainment	$6,975,115	English
4	Skyfall	Sony Pictures Entertainment	$5,259,603	English
5	Ah Boys to Men	Golden Village	$5,088,413	English, Mandarin, Hokkien
6	Madagascar 3: Europe's Most Wanted	United International Pictures	$4,860,625	English
7	The Hobbit: An Unexpected Journey	Warner Bros. Pictures	$4,319,103	English
8	Men in Black 3	Sony Pictures Entertainment	$4,231,573	English
9	Battleship	United International Pictures	$4,189,981	English
10	CZ12	Golden Village	$4,093,933	English, Cantonese, Mandarin

=== Top-grossing films in 2013 ===
All figures provided are by The Hollywood Reporter in US dollars.

Rank	Title	Distributor	Gross	Language
1	Iron Man 3	Walt Disney Pictures	$10.21 mil	English
2	Ah Boys to Men 2	Golden Village	$6.36 mil	English, Mandarin, Hokkien
3	Thor: The Dark World	Walt Disney Pictures	$6.29 mil	English
4	Despicable Me 2	United International Pictures	$5.65 mil	English
5	Man of Steel	Warner Bros. Pictures	$5.02 mil	English
6	Fast & Furious 6	United International Pictures	$4.71 mil	English
7	The Hunger Games: Catching Fire	Lionsgate Films	$4.59 mil	English
8	G.I. Joe: Retaliation	United International Pictures	$4.26 mil	English
9	The Wolverine	20th Century Fox	$3.88 mil	English
9	Pacific Rim	Warner Bros. Pictures	$3.87 mil	English

=== Top-grossing films in 2014 ===
All figures provided are from Box Office Mojo in US dollars. (Figures are accurate as of 2 October 2018)

Rank	Title	Distributor	Gross	Language
1	Transformers: Age of Extinction	United International Pictures	$8,595,728	English
2	X-Men: Days of Future Past	20th Century Fox	$7,436,466	English
3	The Amazing Spider-Man 2	Sony Pictures	$7,125,346	English
4	Captain America: The Winter Soldier	Walt Disney Pictures	$6,012,468	English
5	Guardians of the Galaxy	Walt Disney Pictures	$4,729,358	English
6	The Hobbit: The Battle of the Five Armies	Warner Bros. Pictures	$4,671,403	English
7	Big Hero 6	Walt Disney Pictures	$4,108,229	English
8	Night at the Museum: Secret of the Tomb	20th Century Fox	$4,082,304	English
9	The Maze Runner	20th Century Fox	$3,851,494	English
10	The Hunger Games: Mockingjay - Part 1	Cathay Organisation	$3,801,448	English

=== Top-grossing films in 2015 ===
All figures provided are from Box Office Mojo in US dollars. (Figures are accurate as of 2 October 2018)

Rank	Title	Distributor	Gross	Language
1	Avengers: Age of Ultron	Walt Disney Pictures	$9,904,467	English
2	Jurassic World	United International Pictures	$8,766,526	English
3	Star Wars: The Force Awakens	Walt Disney Pictures	$7,153,662	English
4	Fast & Furious 7	United International Pictures	$6,814,286	English
5	Ah Boys to Men 3: Frogmen	Golden Village	$5,607,373	English, Mandarin, Hokkien
6	Ip Man 3	Scorpio East Pictures and Shaw Organisation	$5,387,597	Mandarin
7	Mission: Impossible – Rogue Nation	United International Pictures	$5,380,343	English
8	Minions	United International Pictures	$5,214,884	English
9	Spectre (film)	Sony Pictures	$4,598,137	English
10	Ant-Man	Walt Disney Pictures	$4,514,252	English

=== Top-grossing films in 2016 ===
All figures provided are from Box Office Mojo in US dollars. (Figures are accurate as of 2 October 2018)

Rank	Title	Distributor	Gross	Language
1	Captain America: Civil War	Walt Disney Pictures	$8,396,857	English
2	X-Men: Apocalypse	20th Century Fox	$5,865,247	English
3	Batman v Superman: Dawn of Justice	Warner Bros. Pictures	$5,742,914	English
4	Doctor Strange	Walt Disney Pictures	$5,382,107	English
5	Deadpool	20th Century Fox	$4,499,140	English
6	Zootopia	Walt Disney Pictures	$4,370,000	English
7	Finding Dory	Walt Disney Pictures	$4,135,984	English
8	Rogue One: A Star Wars Story	Walt Disney Pictures	$4,120,651	English
9	Kung Fu Panda 3	20th Century Fox	$3,759,394	English
10	The Jungle Book	Walt Disney Pictures	$3,517,370	English

=== Top-grossing films in 2017 ===
All figures provided are from Box Office Mojo in US dollars. (Figures are accurate as of 2 October 2018)

Rank	Title	Distributor	Gross	Language
1	Thor: Ragnarok	Walt Disney Pictures	$5,950,587	English
2	Fast & Furious 8	United International Pictures	$5,525,513	English
3	Beauty and the Beast	Walt Disney Pictures	$5,359,049	English
4	Spider-Man: Homecoming	Sony Pictures	$5,316,786	English
5	Jumanji: Welcome to the Jungle	Sony Pictures	$5,188,464	English
6	Star Wars: The Last Jedi	Walt Disney Pictures	$4,634,747	English
7	Guardians of the Galaxy Vol. 2	Walt Disney Pictures	$4,606,033	English
8	Transformers: The Last Knight	Paramount Pictures	$4,444,479	English
9	Despicable Me 3	United International Pictures	$3,784,648	English
10	Logan	20th Century Fox	$3,676,578	English

=== Top-grossing films in 2018 ===
All figures provided are by 8 Days in Singapore dollars.

Rank	Title	Distributor	Gross	Language
1	Avengers: Infinity War	Walt Disney Pictures	$16.22m	English
2	Jurassic World: Fallen Kingdom	United International Pictures	$9.93m	English
3	Black Panther	Walt Disney Pictures	$9.77m	English
4	Aquaman	Warner Bros. Pictures	$9.68m	English
5	Mission: Impossible – Fallout	United International Pictures	$7.38m	English
6	Crazy Rich Asians	Warner Bros. Pictures	$7.30m	English
7	Incredibles 2	Walt Disney Pictures	$6.62m	English
8	Venom	Sony Pictures	$5.96m	English
9	Ant-Man and the Wasp	Walt Disney Pictures	$5.56m	English
10	Deadpool 2	20th Century Fox	$5.29m	English

=== Top-grossing films in 2019 ===
All figures provided are from IMDA in Singapore dollars.

Rank	Title	Distributor	Gross	Language
1	Avengers: Endgame	Walt Disney Pictures	$18.27 mil	English
2	Captain Marvel	Walt Disney Pictures	$9.58 mil	English
3	Spider-Man: Far from Home	Sony Pictures	$8.83 mil	English
4	Frozen 2	Walt Disney Pictures	$7.65 mil	English
5	Ip Man 4: The Finale	Shaw Organisation	$7.07 mil	English, Mandarin
6	Jumanji: The Next Level	Sony Pictures	$6.46 mil	English
7	Joker	Warner Bros. Pictures	$6.07 mil	English
8	Aladdin	Walt Disney Pictures	$5.59 mil	English
9	Hobbs & Shaw	United International Pictures	$5.36 mil	English
10	The Lion King	Walt Disney Pictures	$5.05 mil	English

== Top grossing films in the 2020s ==
=== Top-grossing films in 2020 ===
All figures provided are from IMDA in Singapore dollars.

Box office was suspended from 27 March to 12 July due to government regulation as a result of the COVID-19 pandemic.

Rank	Title	Distributor	Gross	Language
1	Wonder Woman 1984	Warner Bros. Pictures	$4.72 mil	English
2	Peninsula	Next Entertainment World	$2.71 mil	Korean
3	Mulan	Walt Disney Pictures	$2.59 mil	English
4	Tenet	Warner Bros. Pictures	$2.56 mil	English
5	Demon Slayer: Mugen Train	Toho	$2.26 mil	Japanese
6	Soul	Walt Disney Pictures	$1.77 mil	English
7	1917	Universal Pictures	$1.55 mil	English
8	Shock Wave 2	Universe Films Distribution	$1.55 mil	Mandarin
9	The Diam Diam Era	Golden Village Pictures	$1.52 mil	Mandarin, Hokkien
10	Birds of Prey	Warner Bros. Pictures	$1.48 mil	English

=== Top-grossing films in 2021 ===
All figures provided are from IMDA in Singapore dollars.

Rank	Title	Distributor	Gross	Language
1	Spider-Man: No Way Home	Sony Pictures Entertainment	$12.43 mil	English
2	Shang-Chi and the Legend of the Ten Rings	Walt Disney Studios Motion Pictures	$6.64 mil	English
3	Godzilla vs. Kong	Warner Bros. Pictures	$5.07 mil	English
4	Eternals	Walt Disney Studios Motion Pictures	$3.92 mil	English
5	No Time To Die	Universal Pictures	$3.52 mil	English
6	F9	Universal Pictures	$3.37 mil	English
7	Venom: Let There Be Carnage	Sony Pictures Entertainment	$3.33 mil	English
8	Black Widow	Walt Disney Studios Motion Pictures	$2.68 mil	English
9	Dune	Warner Bros. Pictures	$1.74 mil	English
10	Raya and the Last Dragon	Walt Disney Pictures	$1.68 mil	English

=== Top-grossing films in 2022 ===
All figures provided are from IMDA in Singapore dollars.

Rank	Title	Distributor	Gross	Language
1	Avatar: The Way of Water	Walt Disney Studios Motion Pictures	$10.67 mil	English
2	Doctor Strange in the Multiverse of Madness	Walt Disney Studios Motion Pictures	$9.29 mil	English
3	Top Gun: Maverick	Paramount Pictures International	$7.96 mil	English
4	Black Panther: Wakanda Forever	Walt Disney Studios Motion Pictures	$7.64 mil	English
5	Thor: Love and Thunder	Walt Disney Studios Motion Pictures	$7.42 mil	English
6	Jurassic World Dominion	Universal Pictures International	$6.72 mil	English
7	Minions: The Rise of Gru	Universal Pictures International	$4.71 mil	English
8	The Batman	Warner Brothers Entertainment	$4.59 mil	English
9	Black Adam	Warner Brothers Entertainment	$4.16 mil	English
10	Fantastic Beasts: The Secrets of Dumbledore	Warner Brothers Entertainment	$3.07 mil	English

=== Top-grossing films in 2023 ===
All figures provided are from IMDA in Singapore dollars.

Rank	Title	Distributor	Gross	Language
1	Barbie	Warner Bros. Pictures	$5.89 mil	English
2	Transformers: Rise of the Beasts	Paramount Pictures International	$5.29 mil	English
3	Mission: Impossible – Dead Reckoning Part One	Paramount Pictures International	$5.27 mil	English
4	Guardians of the Galaxy Vol. 3	Walt Disney Studios Motion Pictures	$4.95 mil	English
5	Oppenheimer	Universal Pictures International	$4.77 mil	English
6	The Super Mario Bros. Movie	Universal Pictures International	$4.62 mil	English
7	Ant-Man and the Wasp: Quantumania	Walt Disney Studios Motion Pictures	$4.30 mil	English
8	Aquaman and the Lost Kingdom	Warner Bros. Pictures	$3.94 mil	English
9	Spider-Man: Across the Spider-Verse	Sony Pictures Releasing	$3.71 mil	English
10	Fast X	Universal Pictures International	$3.60 mil	English

=== Top-grossing films in 2024 ===
All figures provided are from IMDA in Singapore dollars.

Rank	Title	Distributor	Gross	Language(s)
1	Deadpool & Wolverine	Walt Disney Pictures	$6.49 mil	English
2	How To Make Millions Before Grandma Dies	GDH 559	$5.38 mil	Thai
3	Money No Enough 3	mm2 Entertainment	$4.49 mil	Mandarin, Hokkien
4	Kung Fu Panda 4	Universal Pictures International	$4.13 mil	English
5	Godzilla x Kong: The New Empire	Warner Bros. Pictures	$3.76 mil	English
6	Despicable Me 4	Universal Pictures International	$3.71 mil	English
7	Wicked	Universal Pictures International	$3.55 mil	English
8	Dune: Part Two	Warner Bros. Pictures	$3.32 mil	English
9	Moana 2	Walt Disney Pictures	$3.31 mil	English
10	Inside Out 2	Walt Disney Pictures	$3.18 mil	English

=== Top-grossing films in 2025 ===
All figures provided are from Box Office Mojo in US dollars. (Figures are accurate as of 14 January 2026)

Rank	Title	Distributor	Gross	Language(s)
1	Zootopia 2	Walt Disney Pictures	$4.72 mil	English
2	Ne Zha 2	Beijing Enlight Pictures	$4.00 mil	Mandarin
3	Mission: Impossible – The Final Reckoning	Paramount Pictures International	$3.98 mil	English
4	Jurassic World Rebirth	Universal Pictures International	$3.80 mil	English
5	Avatar: Fire and Ash	Walt Disney Pictures	$3.55 mil	English
6	The Fantastic Four: First Steps	Walt Disney Pictures	$2.54 mil	English
7	Thunderbolts*	Walt Disney Studios Motion Pictures	$2.46 mil	English
8	Lilo & Stitch	Walt Disney Studios Motion Pictures	$2.14 mil	English
9	How to Train Your Dragon	Universal Pictures International	$2.13 mil	English
10	Wicked: For Good	Universal Pictures International	$1.98 mil	English

=== Top-grossing films in 2026 ===
All figures provided are from Box Office Mojo in US dollars. (Figures are accurate as of 20 November 2026)

*	Denotes films still running in cinemas.

Rank	Title	Distributor	Gross	Language
1	The Odyssey*	Universal Pictures International	$6.20 mil	English
2	Project Hail Mary	Sony Pictures Releasing	$2.75 mil	English
3	Toy Story 5	Walt Disney Pictures	$2.57 mil	English
4	The Super Mario Galaxy Movie	Universal Pictures International	$2.46 mil	English
5	The Devil Wears Prada 2	Walt Disney Pictures	$2.14 mil	English
6	Hoppers	Walt Disney Pictures	$2.11 mil	English
7	Michael	Universal Pictures International	$1.96 mil	English
8	Minions & Monsters*	Universal Pictures International	$1.63 mil	English
9	Avatar: Fire and Ash	Walt Disney Pictures	$1.57 mil	English
10	Obsession	Universal Pictures International	$1.48 mil	English

== See also ==
- List of highest-grossing films
- List of top-grossing movies in the United States and Canada
