= I Not Stupid 3 =

2024 Singaporean film directed by Jack Neo

- Theatrical release poster
- Chinese: 小孩不笨 3
- Literal meaning: "Children Are Not Stupid 3"
- Hanyu Pinyin: Xiǎo hái bù bèn 3
- Directed by: Jack Neo
- Screenplay by: Jack Neo; Liu Linyi; Liu Qi
- Starring: Zhou Yuchen; Camans Kong; Hu Jing; Jae Liew; Goh Wee-Ann; Joseph Ng Zhiyang; Collin Chee; Cheryl Desiree Chan; Xixi Lim; Ben Logan Sng; Glenn Yong; Terence Cao; Selena Tan; Patricia Mok; Anna Lin Ruping; Xiong Lingyi; Lee Kin Mun; Chew Chong Tak
- Music by: Alex Oh; Ryan Yu
- Production companies: mm2 Entertainment; J Team Productions
- Distributed by: mm2 Entertainment United International Pictures
- Release date: 6 June 2024
- Country: Singapore
- Languages: Mandarin; English

I Not Stupid 3 (Chinese: 小孩不笨3) is a 2024 Singaporean sociodrama film written and directed by Jack Neo, featuring child actors Zhou Yuchen, Camans Kong, Goh Wee-Ann and Joseph Ng Zhiyang. The film also stars Hu Jing, Jae Liew, Collin Chee, Cheryl Desiree Chan, Xixi Lim, Ben Logan Sng, Glenn Yong, Terence Cao, Selena Tan, Patricia Mok, Anna Lin Ruping, Xiong Lingyi, Lee Kin Mun and Chew Chong Tak. It is the standalone sequel to I Not Stupid (2002) and I Not Stupid Too (2006).

== Plot ==
Wang Zi Hao, a Primary 6 expatriate student from Shanghai, struggles academically at Yuzher Primary School in Singapore. He performs poorly in English, Mathematics, Chinese, and Science while spending excessive time playing video games at home. Wen Ting, his mother, forces him to study through intense memorisation exercises and endless tuition classes at Xin Yuan Fei Edu Hub (新源飞教育一站式), a renowned tuition centre. Zi Hao does not require tuition for Chinese and Mathematics as he performs excellently in them.

As his grades improve, Zi Hao rivals Jayden Lee Jun Wei, the school's top student and a good friend. Sophia Chew, Jayden's mother, notices this and warns Jayden to stay away from Zi Hao, straining their friendship. Obsessed with Jayden maintaining his position as Class 6A's top student, she pressures him into seeing Zi Hao as a competitor rather than a friend.

Mr. Lee, a newly appointed form teacher, impresses Class 6A by solving a complex algebra equation. He quickly becomes admired by the class for being intelligent and having a good appearance.

Wen Ting struggles with her failing marriage. Her husband, who lives in China, refuses to financially support them, leading to their eviction from their semi-detached home to an HDB flat. (Note: A public apartment, or flat, built by the Housing and Development Board (HDB).) While moving, the husband texts her, saying that he wants a divorce. Wen Ting is devastated and signs Zi Hao up for an English speech competition, where he competes against Jayden and other classmates. Jayden, tasked with speaking on the topic "My Mother", struggles emotionally due to his strained relationship with his mother, and places last. Zi Hao, also assigned the same topic, places fifth. After the competition, Chew manipulates Jayden into planting cheat notes in Zi Hao’s pencil case.

During the Science Preliminary Examination, Zi Hao is caught with the cheat notes by Mr. Lim, another teacher. He is interrogated by Mr. Lee and Mr. Lim, but since the handwriting differs from his own, it is revealed that Rachel, another student, had written the notes to help Jayden. Under interrogation, Jayden breaks down and confesses that he had been caned and verbally abused by his mother for losing to Zi Hao in academics. Zi Hao overhears this and, being sympathetic towards Jayden, deliberately lowers his own score in the Mathematics Preliminary Examination by crossing out correct answers.

Chew is later summoned to a meeting with Mr. Lee regarding her mistreatment of Jayden. In retaliation, she files a formal complaint against him that falsely accuses him of interfering in her marital affairs. The school principal, Mrs. Tan, attempts to resolve the issue, but Mr. Lee resigns after a heated argument. Class 6A bids him farewell in tears.

The following day, the mothers of both Jayden and Zi Hao argue about Zi Hao's intentional loss of marks. Chew attempts to report Wen Ting to the Immigration and Checkpoints Authority (ICA) to have her deported back to China. However, Jayden interferes, confronting her and saying that he no longer wants a mother like her. After being slapped by her, he runs into the street and enters a coma due to a car accident.

Following the accident, Chew is consumed with guilt and sincerely apologises to Wen Ting. Meanwhile, Zi Hao and his classmates complete the Primary School Leaving Examination (PSLE) and move on to different secondary schools.

The film ends with Jayden waking up from his coma and choosing to enrol in a neighbourhood secondary school rather than a prestigious institution.

== Cast ==
- Zhou Yuchen as Wang Zi Hao
- Camans Kong as Jayden Lee Jun Wei
- Hu Jing as Wen Ting, Wang Zi Hao's mother
- Jae Liew as Sophia Chew, Jayden Lee's mother
- Goh Wee-Ann as Chen Jia Yao
- Joseph Ng Zhiyang as Andy Lim
- Collin Chee as Kelvin Lee, Jayden Lee's father and a lawyer.
- Cheryl Desiree Chan as Ada, Chen Jia Yao's mother
- Xixi Lim as Andy Lim's mother
- Ben Logan Sng as Andy Lim's father, the CEO of all mee pok stalls in Singapore and neighbouring countries such as Malaysia.
- Glenn Yong as Mr. Lee, Class 6A's Form and Mathematics Teacher.
- Terence Cao as Mr. Lim, Class 6A's Science Teacher.
- Selena Tan as Mrs. Tan, the school principal of Yuzher Primary School, similar to her role from I Not Stupid Too as the school principal of Tom Yeo (Shawn Lee) and Lim Chengcai's (Joshua Ang)'s Secondary School, and both of them are not part of this film either. Tan previously portrayed the role as the mother of Terry Khoo (portrayed by Huang Po Ju, who isn't part of the prequel and this film) from the first installment, in which she spoke a majority of English dialogue during the first film, and spoke inarticulate Mandarin Chinese, as seen in the second film that she was attempting to speak fluent Chinese while mixing some with English. She is also the only cast member who has appeared in all 3 installments of the franchise thus far.
- Patricia Mok as Madam. Mok, the discipline mistress of Yuzher Primary School
- Anna Lin Ruping as Madam. Ye, Class 6A's English Teacher of Yuzher Primary School
- Xiong Lingyi as Xiao Hui, a Chinese mother and Wen Ting's best friend from Shanghai, China.
- Lee Kin Mun as the director, CEO and school principal of Xin Yuan Fei Edu Hub, one of the tuition centres in Singapore.
- Chew Chong Tak as Class 6A's Chinese Teacher of Yuzher Primary School
- Foo Chay Yeow as Jayden Lee's tutor from Xin Yuan Fei Edu Hub hired by Sophia Chew.
- Yati Asmiyati Asbah as Maria, the maid working at home for Jayden Lee, Sophia Chew and Kelvin Lee
- Richard Low as Jerry Khoo Bee Guan reprising his role from I Not Stupid. (Cameo)
- Jack Neo as Mr. Liu reprising his role from I Not Stupid. (Cameo)

== Production ==
Lensing ceremony was held on 13 June 2023.

In an interview, director Jack Neo said that the education system in Singapore has gone through numerous changes since the release of I Not Stupid in 2002 and I Not Stupid Too in 2006, and the film will explore the consequences when certain things remain unchanged.

90% of the filming took place onsite at a local school, with filming taking around 10 hours per day and with no night shots. The film centres around the four child actors Zhou Yuchen (age 11 as of July 2023), Goh Wee-Ann (age 12 as of July 2023), Camans Kong (age 12 as of July 2023) and Joseph Ng Zhiyang (age 11 as of July 2023). More than 2,000 people reportedly participated in the auditions for the film. Among the 4 main cast members, the film marked the acting debut of Joseph Ng Zhiyang.

Filming began from late June and lasted until early August 2023. The screenplay was partially written by two Chinese scriptwriters who are based in Singapore. On the cast members, Hu Jing is a Chinese actress from Chuxiong City, China, and child actor Zhou Yuchen is also from Shanghai. Child actor Camans Kong is from Malaysia while newbie child actor Joseph Ng Zhiyang is from Singapore and previously resided in China for a couple of years. Child actress Goh Wee-Ann is active in the local television scene and has won the Star Awards for Young Talent twice.

== Release ==
Neo revealed that the film was released on 6 June 2024 during the school holidays in Singapore. It was also released in Malaysia on 13 June 2024, in China on 16 August 2024 and in Taiwan on 20 September 2024.

== Reception ==
Tay Yek Keak of 8days gave the film 2.5 out of 5 stars, opining that the film, "despite good performances from both sets of mothers and sons, is long, long-winded and, like a dreaded year-end exam, it gets stuck kinda in the same old loop", and that the long-windedness of the film feels "like an exam checklist and sends [the storyline] to an average, unremarkable graduation."
