= Richard Low =

Singaporean actor (born 1952)

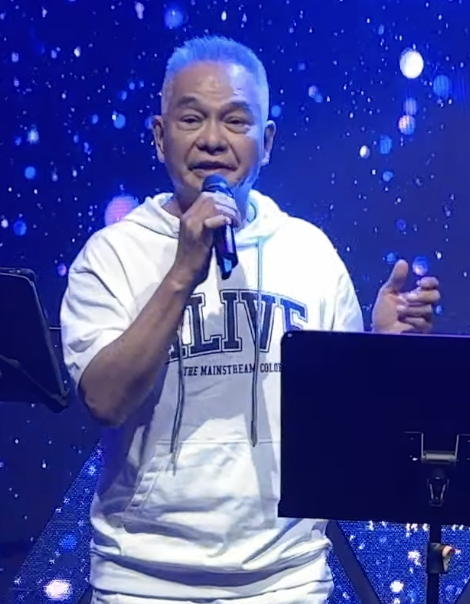
- Low in 2023
- Born: 19 June 1952 (age 74); Colony of Singapore
- Other names: Liu Qianyi; Richard Liu
- Occupation: Actor
- Years active: 1980s-present

Chinese name
- Traditional Chinese: 劉謙益
- Simplified Chinese: 刘谦益
- Hanyu Pinyin: Liú Qiānyì
- Wade–Giles: Liu2 Chien1 I4

Richard Low (born 19 June 1952), also known as Liu Qianyi, is a Singaporean actor. He is best known for acting in many Chinese-language television dramas produced by MediaCorp Channel 8 and its predecessors. He also acted in some of Jack Neo's films.

== Career ==
Low was a theatre actor before joining the SBC's drama training class in the 1980s and switching to television. He is regularly typecast as villains or in unruly gangster-like roles.

== Personal life ==
Low married in 1982.

== Filmography ==
=== Film ===
- I Not Stupid (2002)
- Homerun (2003)
- The Best Bet (2004)
- Avatar (2005)
- The 5Cs 一本难念的经 (2005)
- Singapore Dreaming (2006)
- Ah Long Pte Ltd (2008)
- The Days 歲月 (2008)
- Where Got Ghost? (2009)
- Happy Go Lucky 福星到 (2010)
- Ah Boys to Men (2012)
- Ah Boys to Men 2 (2013)
- Everybody's Business (2013)
- Filial Party (2014)
- King of Mahjong (2015)
- Ah Boys to Men 3: Frogmen (2015)
- Zombiepura (2018)
- I Not Stupid 3 (2024)

=== Television series ===
Year	Title	Role	Notes	Ref.
1986	The Bond 天涯同命鸟	Debt collector		
1986	The Sword and the Song	Emperor of Han		
1987	Neighbours 芝麻绿豆			
1987	Sunshine After Rain 雨过天晴	Director He		
1987	Five Foot Way 五脚基	Inspector Ouyang		
1987	Paint a Rainbow 调色板	A-bao		
1987	Painted Faces 戏班	Zuo Dahai		
1987	Fury of the Dragon 冷月剑无言	Gong Sunju		
1987	Moving On 变迁	A-guang		
1987	Strange Encounters 奇缘 《银河星》 《辗转红尘》 《辛十四娘》 《剑魂》	General of Heaven; Lackey; Liang Guan; Tong Xu		
1987	Pickpockets 提防小手			
1988	Heiress 世纪情	A-bing		
1988	Star Maiden 飞越银河	Doctor	Cameo	
1988	Airforce	Captain Liu		
1988	On the Fringe	Zhang Shun		
1988	The Last Applause 舞榭歌台	Shanzhu		
1988	The Golden Quest 金麒麟	Shen Lao'er		
1988	Mystery 迷离夜 《梦》 《美》	A-rong; Brother Yi		
1988	We are Family 四代同堂			
1988	Teahouse in Chinatown 牛车水人家	A-jun		
1988	Strange Encounters 2 奇缘2 《胭脂魂》 《桃花女斗周公》 《客土秋恨》 《广陵散》	Commander Li; Taoist priest Father-in-law; Han Gang Brother-in-law		
1989	When Hearts Touch 似水柔情	Villager	Cameo	
1989	A Long Way Home 燃烧岁月	Ma Laosan		
1989	The Fortune Hunters 钻石人生	Yu Weibang		
1989	Two Different Lives 金兰结	Boss Zhang		
1989	Song of Youth 生活歌手	Debt collector	Cameo	
1989	Patrol	A-yong		
1989	Good Morning, Sir! 早安老师	Lin A-pei's father	Cameo	
1989	My Sweet Rival 摩登俏冤家	Brother Cheng	Cameo	
1989	The Sword Rules 剑断江湖	Long Wei		
1989	Turn of the Tide 浮沉	Brother Wei		
1990	When Dawn Breaks 乱世黎明	Meng Yuan		
1990	Wishing Well 幻海奇遇 之《错体夫妻》	Uncle Huang		
1990	Navy 壮志豪情	Police Officer		
1990	Journey's End 生命街车	Hou Wanshan		
1990	Enchanted Eyes 天眼	Cai Xiaofei		
1990	Happy World 多多富贵多多情	Tang Jinju		
1991	Against The Wind 启航	Brother Sheng		
1991	Fatal Endearment 谍海危情	Jia Fucai		
1991	Behind Bars 铁狱雷霆	Ganglord B	Cameo	
1991	The Darkest Hour 烈血青春	Jiang De		
1991	Golden Shenton Way 金色珊顿道	Zhu Wanlong		
1991	Black Phoenix 黑凤凰	Xiao Hanfu		
1991	The Future is Mine 锦绣前程	Zhu Xiangqian's father	Cameo	
1992	Changing Fortunes 天赐奇财	Li Biao		
1992	Ladies in Action 霹雳红唇	Ni Wanzhou		
1992	Breaking Point 暴风边缘	Lawyer Zhang	Cameo	
1992	Between Friends 山水喜相逢			
1992	Crime and Passion 执法先锋 之《危情》	Kong Sang		
1992	Duel In Shanghai 轰天龙虎	Prosecutor	Cameo	
1992	Lady Steel 激情女大亨	Sima Xin		
1992	Mystery II 迷离夜II 之《穿梭梦里人》	Wen Yihu		
1993	Heavenly Beings 再战封神榜	Wu Wei		
1993	The Brave One 荡寇英雄	Zheng A-hai		
1993	Reaching for The Stars 银海惊涛	Boss Xiao		
1993	Hidden Truth 法网情天	Chen Dashan		
1993	Sister Dearest 傻妹俏娇娃	Zeng Yaoquan		
1993	The Great Conspiracy 莲花争霸	Tang Zhongyue		
1993	Happy Foes 欢喜冤家	Boss Zhou		
1993	The Witty Advisor 金牌师爷	Master Dada		
1993	Switch 妙鬼临门	Brother Hu		
1993	The Unbeatables I	Qiu Dingtian		
1993	Heaven's Will 天机风云	Chen Liyan	Cameo	
1993	Happy Reunion 年年有鱼	Za Pai Lao Da (Lu)		
1994	Double Life 潇洒走一回	Jiu Fu		
1994	The Blazing Trail 兰桂坊血案		Telemovie	
1994	Those Were The Days 生命擂台	Pang Wei		
1994	Lethal Duo 天使追缉令	He Dafa		
1994	Young Justice Bao 侠义包公	Pang Ji		
1994	Men On The Edge 帮会1889		Telemovie	
1994	Twin Bliss 龙凤呈祥	Boss		
1994	Larceny of Love 雌雄大盗	Xia Kucao		
1994	Veil Of Darkness 历劫浮生		Telemovie	
1994	Challenger 勇者无惧	Li Nanfa		
1994	Against All Odds 共闯荆途	Factory manager	Cameo	
1994	A Chance of Life 生死一线	Fang Suwen's supervisor	Telemovie	
1994	The Valiant One 昆仑奴	Zhang Tongru		
1994	Truly Yours 聪明糊涂心	Brother Long		
1995	The Rangers 铁血雄心	Army officer	Telemovie	
1995	Coffee or Tea 是非屋	Gu Jian		
1995	Fatal Memory 血案迷情	Procecutor	Telemovie	
1995	Strange Encounters III 奇缘3 之《青衣魅影》	Bai Shiwu		
1995	Strange Encounters III 奇缘3 之《门神》	Dragon King of the East Sea		
1995	Secret Files 机密档案	Guo Yuantang's master	Cameo	
1995	Sea Eagle 海岸猎鹰	Superior Chen	Telemovie	
1995	Heavenly Ghost Catcher 天师钟馗 之《一棒雪》	Yan Song		
1995	The Morning Express 阳光列车	Brother Hei		
1995	The Dragons Five 飞龙五将	Zhao Zijian		
1995	Lady Investigators 女探三人组	Lu Wang =		
1995	Sparks of Life 生命火花	Lawyer Ye =		
1995	The Shadow Mission 地下猎人	Tang Fuming		
1995	The Morning Express II 阳光列车2			
1996	Kung Fu Master 1996 掌门人1996	Mr. Jiang		
1996	Royal Battle of Wit 妙师爷三斗毒太监	He Shuli		
1996	Life on the Line 魂断四面佛	Mr. Qi	Telemovie	
1996	A Different Live 妈姐情缘	Liu Dingxia		
1996	Of Cops and Men 城市双雄	Zhou Guotai		
1996	Wild Orchids 再见莹光兰	Liu Qingzong		
1996	The Unbeatables II	Huang Wu		
1997	The Silver Lining	Huang Qinghe		
1997	Playing to Win Uncle当自强	Guo Peihua		
1997	The Accidental Hero 流氓英雄	Chen Qian	Telemovie	
1997	Hidden Scars 心结	Zhang Fan	Telemovie	
1997	Rising Expectations 长河	Shi Cai		
1998	Right Frequency			
1998	Don't Worry Be Happy 3 敢敢做个开心人3	Chen Xiaoshuang		
1998	The Return Of The Condor Heroes	Ouyang Feng		
1998	The New Adventures of Wisely	Lao Cai		
1998	Myths & Legends of Singapore 石叻坡传说 之《一代狮王》	Master Huang		
1998	Living in Geylang 芽笼。芽笼	Wang A-pao		
1998	On the Edge 边缘档案 之《爆发卢》	Huang Hefeng		
1999	From the Medical Files 2 医生档案II 之《边缘回望》	Liao Bingkun		
1999	The Fortune God 财神爷	God of Wealth		
1999	Wok of Life 福满人间	Huang Dadi		
1999	Mr OK OK先生	Zhang A-tu		
1999	PI Blues 乌龙档案	Zhang Biao		
1999	Don't Worry Be Happy 4 敢敢做个开心人4	Chen Xiaoshuang		
2000	The Legendary Swordsman 笑傲江湖	Ren Woxing		
2000	Don't Worry Be Happy 5 敢敢做个开心人5	Chen Xiaoshuang		
2001	Don't Worry Be Happy 6 敢敢做个开心人6	Chen Xiaoshuang		
2001	In Pursuit of Peace	Lin Songde		
2001	Heroes In Black 我来也	Lu Da		
2001	Beyond the Axis of Truth	Song Tianli		
2001	The Challenge 谁与争锋	Luo Jinquan		
2001	The Hotel	Liu Tianyi		
2002	Viva Le Famille	Sun Yongfa		
2002	Brotherhood 有情有义	Zhong Ji		
2002	No Problem 考试家族	Bao Zhongnan		
2002	Kopi-O II	Chen Mingcai		
2002	I Not Stupid 小孩不笨	Mr. Khoo		
2002	Springs of Life			
2003	Health Matters 2 一切由慎开始2 之《百万遗书》	Zhan Qingshan		
2003	Vive La Famille II 好儿好女2	Sun Yongfa		
2003	Love is Beautiful 美丽家庭	Huang Wanshan		
2003	A Toast of Love吃吃面包谈谈情	Sun Yongfa		
2004	The Best Bet 突然发财	Richard		
2004	Crime Hunters 心网追凶	Feng Lang		
2004	Chronicles of Life 我爱我家之真情实录	Hong Jianshun		
2004	Spice Siblings 辣兄辣妹	Fang Yazheng		
2004	Man at 40 跑吧，男人	Bao Qingtian		
2004	An Ode To Life	Zhang Yaokun		
2004	Timeless Gift	Wang Yongding		
2005	You Are the One 二分之一缘分	Hao Shunli		
2005	Portrait of Home	Lin Shitou		
2005	Portrait of Home II	Lin Shitou		
2006	ABC DJ	Goh Boon Keng		
2006	C.I.D.	Fang Honglie		
2007	My Dear Kins 亲本家人	Zhang Bainian		
2007	Making Miracles	Zhou Haitian		
2007	Switched!	Jiang Peixiang		
2007	Metamorphosis	An Guoxiong	Cameo	
2008	The Truth	Lu Ronggang		
2008	Beach.Ball.Babes	Wang Weixiong		
2008	Love Blossoms II	Old Peter		
2009	The Dream Catchers	Lin Guodong		
2010	New Beginnings	Cai Fulin		
2010	The Score	Luo Zhibin		
2010	Breakout	Jimmy Zhang		
2011	The In-Laws	Wang Du		
2011	The Oath	Yang Liming		
2012	Absolutely Charming	Song Tiancheng		
2012	Jump!	Uncle Cai		
2012	Poetic Justice	Mr Li	Cameo	
2013	The Dream Makers	Zhao De		
2013	Disclosed	Kuang Baomin		
2014	Spouse for House	Tan Kok Wee		
2014	World at Your Feet	Wu Shengda		
2014	In The Name Of Love	Hong Bo		
2015	A Blessed Life	Huang Jinsha		
2015	Second Chance 流氓律师	Chen Guo		
2015	Spouse for House 2	Tan Kok Wee		
2015	Super Senior	Liu Fugui		
2015	The Dream Makers II	Zhao De		
2016	Tanglin	Lim Kwong San		
2016	Hero	Old Fogey		
2018	Eat Already? 4	Chen Zhiwen		
2018	Say Cheese	Pan Renyi		
2018	Heart To Heart 心点心	Zhou Zhiyuan		
2019	How Are You?	Ma Sai		
2019	Hello From The Other Side – Its Time 阴错阳差 — 时辰到	Boss		
2019	Old Is Gold 老友万岁	Anthony		
2019	While You Were Away 一切从昏睡开始	Wu Xinghua		
2021	Recipe of Life 味之道	Dong Bai		
2021	How Are You? 2	Ma Sai		
2021	The Peculiar Pawnbroker 人心鉴定师	Zhang Ruixiang		
2022	Home Again 多年后的全家福	Ye Fugui		
2022	The Unbreakable Bond 寄生	Luo Maoqiang		
2022	Healing Heroes 医生不是神	Liang Zhipeng		
2022	Dark Angel 黑天使	Gu Wangda		
2023	Mr Zhou's Ghost Stories@Job Haunting II	Lao Luo		
2023	1943: Kappaleriya Thamizhan	The General	Tamil Drama	
2023	Whatever Will Be, Will Be	Hu Nanshan	Dialect series	
2024	Moments (时光倾城)			
2025	We Are Number 1 (没马跑)			

=== Others ===
- Beauty World: President Star Charity 美世界：总统星光慈善 (1998)

== Discography ==
=== Compilation albums ===
Year	English title	Mandarin title
2013	MediaCorp Music Lunar New Year Album 13	新传媒群星金蛇献祥福
2020	MediaCorp Music Lunar New Year Album 20	裕鼠鼠纳福迎春了

== Awards and nominations ==
Organisation	Year	Category	Nominated work	Result	Ref.
Star Awards	1995	Best Supporting Actor	Coffee or Tea (as Gu Jian)	Nominated	
Star Awards	1997	Best Supporting Actor	The Silver Lining (as Huang Qinghe)	Won	
Star Awards	1997	Top 10 Most Popular Male Artistes	—N/a	Nominated	
Star Awards	1998	Best Supporting Actor	Living in Geylang (as Wang A'pao)	Nominated	
Star Awards	1998	Top 10 Most Popular Male Artistes	—N/a	Nominated	
Star Awards	1999	Best Actor	Mr OK (as Zhang A'tu)	Nominated	
Star Awards	2000	Best Comedy Performer	Don't Worry, Be Happy	Nominated	
Star Awards	2000	Top 10 Most Popular Male Artistes	—N/a	Nominated	
Star Awards	2002	Best Comedy Performer	I Not Stupid Too	Nominated	
Star Awards	2002	Top 10 Most Popular Male Artistes	—N/a	Nominated	
Star Awards	2003	Top 10 Most Popular Male Artistes	—N/a	Nominated	
Star Awards	2009	Top 10 Most Popular Male Artistes	—N/a	Nominated	
Star Awards	2011	Top 10 Most Popular Male Artistes	—N/a	Nominated	
Star Awards	2012	Top 10 Most Popular Male Artistes	—N/a	Nominated	
Star Awards	2013	Top 10 Most Popular Male Artistes	—N/a	Nominated	
Star Awards	2014	Top 10 Most Popular Male Artistes	—N/a	Nominated	
Star Awards	2019	Best Evergreen Artiste	—N/a	Nominated	
Star Awards	2019	Top 10 Most Popular Male Artistes	—N/a	Nominated	
Star Awards	2021	Best Evergreen Artiste	—N/a	Nominated	
Star Awards	2021	Top 10 Most Popular Male Artistes	—N/a	Nominated	
Star Awards	2022	Top 10 Most Popular Male Artistes	—N/a	Nominated	
Star Awards	2023	Best Evergreen Artiste	—N/a	Nominated	
Star Awards	2023	Top 10 Most Popular Male Artistes	—N/a	Nominated	
Star Awards	2024	Top 10 Most Popular Male Artistes	—N/a	Nominated	
Star Awards	2025	Top 10 Most Popular Male Artistes	—N/a	Nominated	
