= Shawn Lee =

Shawn Lee may refer to:

- Shawn Lee (actor) (born 1990), actor from Singapore
- Shawn Lee (musician) (born 1963), American musician
- Shawn Lee (American football) (1966–2011), American football defensive tackle

== See also ==
- Sean Lee (born 1986), American football linebacker
- Shaun Li, fictional character
