= Star Awards 2002 =

Singaporean television awards

Star Awards 2002 红星大奖2002
- Date: 8 December 2002
- Location: MediaCorp TV Theatre
- Country: Singapore
- Hosted by: Timothy Chao; Chun Guek Lay

Highlights
- Best Drama: Beautiful Connection 九层糕
- Best Variety/Info-ed Show: The Mission 创业无敌手
- Best Actor: Li Nanxing 李南星
- Best Actress: Huang Biren 黄碧仁
- Special Achèvement Award: Chen Shucheng 陈澍承

Television/radio coverage
- Network: MediaCorp Channel 8
- Runtime: 180 mins

Star Awards 2002 is a television award telecast in 2002 as part of the annual Star Awards organised by MediaCorp for MediaCorp TV Channel 8. The ninth installment was held on 8 December 2002, with the ceremony hosted by Taiwanese host Timothy Chao and Channel 8 newscaster Chun Guek Lay. 28 awards were given out this year, an increase of five from last year, including three new categories awarded this year.

This is the first a movie had garnered nominations for the Star Awards ceremony. However, Best Serial Beautiful Connection became the most successful winner for the ceremony, having won three awards in the ceremony.

== Winners and nominees ==
Winners are listed first, highlighted in boldface.

As like preceding ceremonies, Professional and Technical Awards were presented before the main ceremony via a clip montage due to time constraints. Unless otherwise stated, the lists of winners are only reflected in the table.

**Best Director 最佳导演**: **Lai Lee Thin 赖丽婷 - The Reunion 顶天立地**	**Best Screenplay 最佳剧本**: **Ang Eng Tee 洪荣狄 – The Vagrant 豹子胆**
**Best Sound Design 最佳音效**: **Chen Weichang 陈伟晶 and Leong Mei Han 梁美娴 - The Reunion 顶天立地**	**Best Set Design 最佳布景设计**: **Chen Jiagu 陈家谷 and Oh Hock Leong 胡福隆 - Bukit Ho Swee 河水山**
**Best Variety Producer 最佳综艺编导**: **Tan Bee Leng 陈美玲 – City Beat 城人杂志**	**Best Variety Research Writer 最佳综艺资料撰稿**: **Goh Huiling 吴慧玲 - The Mission 创业无敌手**
**Best News Story 最佳新闻报道**: **Wi Jinfeng 吴金凤 - Geylang, Home Sweet Home? 芽笼，Home Sweet Home?**	**Top Rated Drama Serial 最高收视率电视剧**: **Beautiful Connection 九层糕**

The main awards were presented during the ceremony

**Best Drama Serial 最佳电视剧**: **Beautiful Connection 九层糕**; No Problem! 考试家族; The Reunion 顶天立地; The Vagrant 豹子胆; Viva Le Famille 好儿好女	**Best Sitcom 最佳情境喜剧**: **I Not Stupid 小孩不笨**; Don't Worry Be Happy (Season 6) 敢敢做个开心人6; Katong Miss Oh 加东Miss Oh; New Dragon's Inn 新龙门客栈; School Days (Season 3) 七彩学堂3
**Best Variety Show 最佳综艺节目**: **The Mission 创业无敌手**; City Beat 城人杂志; Sweet and Sour Talk 美味天王; Top Fun 欢乐巅峰; Who Wants to Be a Millionaire? 百万大赢家	**Best Variety Special 最佳综艺特备节目**: **NKF Charity Show 2002 (Show 2) 群星照亮千万心魅力闪耀天地情**; Affairs of the Heart 心手相连; LNY Eve Variety Special 2002 骏马奔腾迎新春2002; NKF Charity Show 2002 (Show 1) 群星照亮千万心爱无界限传温情; Star Awards 2001 红星大奖 2001
**Best Actor 最佳男主角**: **Li Nanxing 李南星 - The Vagrant 豹子胆**; Chew Chor Meng 周初明 - The Reunion 顶天立地; Chen Shucheng 陈澍城 - Viva Le Famille 好儿好女; Terence Cao 曹国辉 - The Reunion 顶天立地; Xie Shaoguang 谢韶光 - Beautiful Connection 九层糕	**Best Actress 最佳女主角**: **Huang Biren 黄碧仁 - Beautiful Connection 九层糕**; Aileen Tan 陈丽贞 - Beautiful Connection 九层糕; Chen Liping 陈莉萍 - No Problem! 考试家族; Ivy Lee 李锦梅 - The Wing of Desire 天使的诱惑; Jacelyn Tay 郑秀珍 - The Wing of Desire 天使的诱惑
**Best Supporting Actor 最佳男配角**: **Huang Yiliang 黄奕良 - The Vagrant 豹子胆**; Chen Shucheng 陈澍承 - The Wing of Desire 天使的诱惑; Huang Bingjie 黄炳杰 - The Wing of Desire 天使的诱惑; Nick Shen - The Reunion; Yao Wenlong - Viva Le Famille	**Best Supporting Actress 最佳女配角**: **Chen Huihui 陈慧慧 - The Wing of Desire 天使的诱惑**; Joey Swee 徐绮 - The Reunion; Lin Meijiao - Brotherhood); Tan Kheng Hua - Beautiful Connection; Tracer Wong 王裕香 - The Vagrant
**Best Variety Show Host 最佳综艺主持人**: **Sharon Au 欧菁仙 - City Beat 城人杂志**; Dasmond Koh 许振荣 - The Mission 创业无敌手; Jeff Wang 王建复 - City Beat 城人杂志; Mark Lee 李国煌 - One Fun Day 惊喜一整天; Dennis Chew 周崇庆 - One Fun Day 惊喜一整天	**Best Comedy Performer 最佳喜剧演员**: **Mark Lee 李国煌- Katong Miss Oh 加东Miss Oh**; Huang Wenyong 黄文永 - Don't Worry Be Happy (season 6) 敢敢做个开心人6); Richard Low 刘谦益 - I Not Stupid 小孩不笨; Dennis Chew 周崇庆 - New Dragon's Inn 新龙门客栈; Zoe Tay 郑惠玉 - Katong Miss Oh 加东Miss Oh
**Young Talent Award 青苹果奖**: **Lee Chuang Rui - I Not Stupid**; Ang Ching Hui 翁沁慧 - The Vagrant; Ang Ser Kian Joshua 洪赐健 - I Not Stupid; Liew Po Zhuang 刘柏妆 - Beautiful Connection; Huang Po Ju 黄博儒 - I Not Stupid	**Best News/Current Affairs Presenter 最佳新闻播报／时事主持人**: **Chun Guek Lay 曾月丽**; Chew Huoy Min 周慧敏; Chua Ying 蔡萦; Ng Siew Leng 黄秀玲; Tung Soo Hua 董素华
**Best Theme Song 最佳主题曲**: **Maggie Tseng 邓妙华 - Bukit Ho Swee 河水山 - 河水山**; Rui En 卢瑞恩 - Beautiful Connection 九层糕 - 快乐方式; Michelle Saram 郑雪儿 - Fantasy 星梦情真 - 星梦; Donnie Chan 陈国荣 - I Not Stupid 小孩不笨 - 有用的人; Wang Min Hui 王敏惠 - Viva Le Famille 好儿好女 - 不要轻易松手	**Most Popular Newcomer 最受欢迎新人**: **Jeanette Aw 欧萱**; Allan Wu 吴振宇; Jaime Teo 赵彩菱; Le Yao 乐瑶; Lim Leng Kee 林灵芝

=== Special awards ===
**Special Achievement Award** **特别成就奖**	**Chen Shucheng 陈澍承**

=== Top 10 Most Popular Artiste ===
Top 10 Most Popular Male Artistes	Top 10 Most Popular Female Artistes
**Chew Chor Meng**; **Christopher Lee**; **Edmund Chen**; **Jack Neo**; **Li Nanxing**; **Mark Lee**; **Xie Shaoguang**; **Billy Wang**; **Gurmit Singh**; **Dasmond Koh**; Chen Hanwei; Chen Shucheng; Chen Tianwen; Vincent Ng; Dennis Chew; Huang Wenyong; Moses Lim; Richard Low; Tay Ping Hui; Terence Cao	**Zoe Tay**; **Chen Liping**; **Fann Wong**; **Huang Biren**; **Ivy Lee**; **Phyllis Quek**; **Xiang Yun**; **Jacelyn Tay**; **Sharon Au**; **Michelle Saram**; Aileen Tan; Chen Huihui; Cynthia Koh; Fiona Xie; Koh Chieng Mun; Lin Meijiao; Pan Lingling; Patricia Mok; Wong Li Lin; Yvonne Lim

==== Malaysia polling ====
**Malaysia's Favourite Drama Serial** **马来西亚最受欢迎电视剧**: **Madam White Snake 青蛇与白蛇**	**Malaysia's Favourite Male Artiste** **马来西亚最受欢迎男艺人**: **Chen Hanwei 陈汉玮**	**Malaysia's Favourite Female Artiste** **马来西亚最受欢迎女艺人**: **Zoe Tay 郑惠玉**

== Ceremony ==
Professional and Technical Awards were presented before the main ceremony via a clip montage due to time constraints. The main awards were presented during the ceremony

== Presenters ==
The following individuals presented awards or performed musical numbers.

Artistes / Special guests
Bowie Lam; Karen Mok	Presented Best Actor
Aaron Kwok; Zoe Tay	Presented Best Actress
Law Kar-ying	Presented Best Supporting Actor and Best Supporting Actress
Jack Neo; Sharon Au	Presented Best Comedian
Li Nanxing	Presented Most Favourite Newcomer
Mavis Hee; Power Station	Presented Best Theme Song
Alex Dung 董至成	Presented Best Variety Show Host
Jack Neo	Presented Young Talent Award
Professor Emeritus and Founding Dean of the Wee Kim Wee School of Communication and Information, Nanyang Technology University; Professor Eddie Kuo 郭振羽	Presented Best Newscaster/Current Affairs Host
Tony Leung; Andy Lau	Presented Best Drama Serial, Best Variety Show and Best Variety Special
Lydia Sum	Presented Best Sitcom
Bowie Lam	Presented Malaysia's Favourite Drama Serial, Malaysia's Favourite Male Artiste and Malaysia's Favourite Female Artiste
Minister for Prime Minister's Office and Second Minister for Transport; Lee Yock Suan	Presented Special Achievement Award
Lydia Sum; Alex Dung 董至成	Presented Top 10 Most Favourite Male Artiste
Aaron Kwok; Karen Mok	Presented Top 10 Most Favourite Female Artiste
