= Megan Zheng =

Singaporean actress (born 1993)

- Born: 8 October 1993 (age 32); Singapore
- Occupation: Actress
- Years active: 2003–2007
- Awards: Golden Horse Awards – Best New Performer

Chinese name
- Simplified Chinese: 郑智允
Transcriptions
- Musical career
- Also known as: Zhèng Zhìyǔn
- Origin: Singapore

Megan Zheng (also known as Megan Tay, Chinese: 郑智允; pinyin: Zhèng Zhìyǔn) is a Singaporean former actress who starred in the Singaporean movies Homerun and One More Chance. For her role in Homerun, Zheng, then 10 years old, became the first Singaporean to win a Golden Horse Award, sharing her Best New Performer award with Wang Baoqiang.

== Acting career ==
When Zheng was five, she accompanied her elder sister (who had a part in a documentary) to a TV station. Upon realising that the producer wanted her to play a part, a terrified Zheng hid behind a sofa.

Jack Neo, who wrote and directed Homerun, placed a newspaper advertisement about auditions for a role in the movie, stating that he was looking for a "girl about nine, who is dark, skinny, and can cry and act". After seeing the advertisement, Zheng's father joked that she fitted the bill, prompting the girl to call Neo's J Team Productions and arrange an audition. Just before the audition ended, Zheng reminded Neo that he had yet to see her cry and she then proceeded to demonstrate her ability to do so. This anecdote, coupled with Neo's belief that Zheng could take direction and "her eyes could communicate", convinced Neo to select Zheng over 1006 other children.

During the school holidays, Zheng and the rest of the Homerun cast flew to Malaysia for on-location shoot. Although Zheng was usually able to cry on cue, the cast and crew once had to wait 20 minutes for her to begin. Seeing Zheng crying uncontrollably while shooting a particularly emotional scene, an impressed Xiang Yun commented "Wah, this little kid is very absorbed in her role".

In an interview shortly after Zheng won the award, her mother indicated a desire to see her act again because "this is her interest". Neo intended to cast Zheng in his next film, The Best Bet, but his plans never materialised. Instead, Zheng was given the role of Zeng Xiaowei in One More Chance. She also starred in the 2007 film My Family, My Heart.

== Awards ==
For her role in Homerun, Zheng was one of four considered for the Best New Performer Award at the 40th Golden Horse Awards. One of the other nominees, Ariel Lin, was subsequently disqualified after it was revealed that she had previously made an unreleased movie. Homerun was also nominated for Best Theme Song. At the awards ceremony, Zheng and Wang Baoqiang (of Blind Shaft) were named co-winners of the Best New Performer award, making her the first Singaporean to win a Golden Horse Award.

Raintree Pictures' CEO Daniel Yun commented that Zheng's achievement "puts Singapore film-making on the Asian map", while Dr Wong Lung Hsiang, secretary of the Singapore Film Society, described it as "a landmark for the Singapore film industry".

== Personal life ==
Zheng studied at Jurong Primary School and Fairfield Methodist Secondary School.

As of 2026, Zheng, a mother, is no longer an actress and works a corporate job.

== Filmography ==
| Year | Title | Role |
|---|---|---|
| 2003 | Homerun ( 跑吧孩子) | Chew Seow Fang |
| 2005 | One More Chance (三个好人) | Chin Xiaowei |
| 2007 | My Family My Heart (童心) | Zhen Zhen |
