= I Not Stupid Too =

2006 film directed by Jack Neo

- Directed by: Jack Neo
- Written by: Jack Neo
- Produced by: Daniel Yun; Jinnie Choi
- Starring: Shawn Lee; Ashley Leong; Joshua Ang; Natalli Ong Ai Wen; Johnny Ng; Xiang Yun; Jack Neo; Huang Yiliang; Selena Tan; Ng Suan Loi; Ma Dong-seok
- Music by: Li Yi; Redwan Ali
- Production companies: Mediacorp Raintree Pictures; CJ Entertainment
- Distributed by: United International Pictures
- Release date: 26 January 2006
- Running time: 124 minutes
- Country: Singapore
- Languages: Mandarin; Hokkien; English
- Budget: S$1.5 million
- Box office: S$4 million

I Not Stupid Too (Chinese: 小孩不笨2; pinyin: Xiǎo Hái Bù Bèn 2; lit. 'Children are not stupid 2') is a 2006 comedy film and the standalone sequel to I Not Stupid (2002). It portrays the lives, struggles and adventures of three Singaporean youths—8-year-old and Primary 2 student Jerry Yeo Xueqiang, his 15-year-old brother Tom Yeo Xueqian Secondary 3 student and their 15-year-old good and best friend Lim Chengcai Secondary 3 student—who have a strained relationship with their parents. The film explores the issue of poor parent-child communication.

The screenwriter and film director, Jack Neo, was inspired to make the film by a book about appreciation education. The movie was produced by Mediacorp Raintree Pictures on a budget of S$1.5 million. It stars Ashley Leong, Shawn Lee, Joshua Ang, Xiang Yun, Jack Neo and Huang Yiliang. Filming took place at several Singaporean schools in June 2005.

The film was released in cinemas on 26 January 2006, and earned over S$4 million in total. The film became the second-highest grossing Singaporean film in history: only Money No Enough grossed more. At the 2006 Hong Kong Film Awards, it was nominated for Best Asian Film, but lost to Riding Alone for Thousands of Miles. Critical reception was largely positive, though some criticized the film as overly preachy.

== Plot ==
The plot revolves around the lives of 8 year old Jerry Yeo Xueqiang, his older brother Tom Yeo Xueqian and their good and best friend Lim Chengcai. Primary 2 student Jerry, known for getting Band 1 in every subject, enjoys the performing arts and has the lead role in his primary school concert, while 15-year-old Tom and Secondary 3 student is technologically inclined and a talented blogger, Karen and Steven Yeo's busy schedules give them little time to spend with their children, leading to a strained relationship. With his mother absent, 15-year-old Chengcai and Secondary 3 student and interested in chinese martial arts, was raised by his ex-convict father Mr. Lim, whose fighting skills he inherited.

During a school check for mobile phones, Tom is caught with a pornographic VCD. As his form teacher Mr. Fu Dabing confiscates it, Chengcai argues with him and eventually assaults him together with Tom. Consequently, the school principal decides to expel Chengcai for having a bad disciplinary record and subject Tom to public caning respectively. As their punishments tear them further from their families, Tom and Chengcai join a local street gang; as their initiation, they are forced to shoplift an iPod. However, they are caught by two conmen posing as police officers, who demand that they pay S$2,000 within 2 days or be arrested.

While tutoring Jerry in Mathematics, Steven tells him that people will pay S$500 for an hour of his time. Jerry, who wants his parents to come to his primary school concert, starts saving money and eventually resorts to stealing once at school canteen. After he is caught, an extremely infuriated Steven canes his Jerry, thinking he is to for buying more Pokemon cards, but calms down when the latter comes clean and explains that he wanted S$500 to "buy" an hour of Steven's time; and that stealing was the one last resort for Jerry. This prompts Steven and Karen to read Tom's blog and realize how unappreciated and alienated their children Jerry and Tom feel.

Meanwhile, out of the blue right on the same day Jerry's caning occurred, Tom and Chengcai rob an old lady of her necklace, but regret their action and try to return it to her. A struggle occurs, and Chengcai bumps into several gangsters, while Tom's mobile phone falls out of his pocket. The phone hits the ground, accidentally calling Steven, who is doing a presentation about 3G mobile phones for a contract worth S$3,000,000.

Later, the gangsters whom Chengcai bumped into earlier beat him up. Mr. Lim, who happens to be nearby after he went to a clinic to check up on his illness, tries to protect Chengcai, but is beaten and falls down the stairs as a result, which causes him to be rushed to hospital. Meanwhile, at Tom's side, Steven rushes off to the scene and pleads with the old lady to give Tom a second chance. When the police officers arrive, she tells them she made a prank call. 2 days later, Steven meets the conmen and gives them thousands of dollars of hell money; and then the conmen are arrested by real police officers who have been waiting in ambush close by. On his deathbed at the hospital, Mr. Lim tells Chengcai that he loves him and that he should pursue his talent for chinese martial arts. Witnessing this scene, the school principal is touched and allows Chengcai to return to school. Chengcai then eventually becomes an internationally recognised chinese martial artist. Having finally understood their children Jerry and Tom, Karen, Steven and Tom watch Jerry's concert, much to his delight.

== Cast ==
- Shawn Lee as Tom Yeo Xueqian
  The older brother of the Yeo family.
- Ashley Leong as Jerry Yeo Xueqiang
  The younger brother of the Yeo family, and doubled as the film's everyman and narrator, similar to Huang Po Ju as Terry Khoo from the prequel film.
  - Charles Chan as infant Jerry
  - Raffles Neo as baby Jerry
- Joshua Ang as Lim Chengcai
  A close friend of Tom and a good chinese martial arts street fighter.
- Natalli Ong Ai Wen as Wang Jingjing
  Tom and Chengcai's classmate under Mr. Fu Dabing's class in the Secondary 3 Normal Technical (NT) Level stream.
- Johnny Ng as Mr. Fu Dabing
  Tom and Chengcai's Chinese Teacher. He was praised by the school as a dedicated teacher who invested money on Chinese dictionaries and time as a remedial teacher for Chinese language, though sometimes strict in terms on the student's academic results. He was also the Form Teacher for Tom and Chengcai's class, which falls under the Secondary 3 Normal Technical (NT) Level stream.
- Xiang Yun as Karen Yeo
  Jerry and Tom Yeo's Mother, Steven Yeo's Wife and a Chinese Magazine editor.
- Jack Neo as Steven Yeo
  Jerry and Tom Yeo's Father, Karen Yeo's Husband and a phone salesman.
- Huang Yiliang as Mr. Lim, Lim Chengcai's Father
  It was revealed in the film that he had previously lived in an environment of thugs and an ex-convict, though was overprotective on Chengcai's actions.
- Selena Tan as the principal of Tom and Chengcai's Secondary School
  As a principal with inarticulate Mandarin, as seen in the film she was attempting to speak fluent Mandarin while mixing some with English. Tan previously portrayed the role as the Mother of Terry and Selena Khoo from the prequel, in which she spoke a majority of English dialogue during the previous installment.
- Ng Suan Loi as Jerry and Tom Yeo's Grandmother and Steven Yeo's Mother and Karen Yeo's Mother-In-Law
  She served as an advisor to Karen and Steven Yeo, and also shares experience as a parent to her own son Steven Yeo.
- Nick Shen as Mr. Hao Letian
  A school teacher who teaches another class from the Express stream.
- Liu Lingling as Yang/Lady Boss
  She was the kopitiam owner and a close friend of Lim. Following Lim's death at the end of the film, she was later a legal guardian for Chengcai.
- Yati Asmiyati Asbah as Yati, the maid for the Yeo family.
- Tan Xinyi as Xiaoxi
  Jerry's classmate and closest friend.
- Henry Thia as the owner of a retail shop selling bags.
- Jimmy Nah as a scammer impersonating as a police officer.
- Anna Lin Ruping as Mrs. Alicia Tan, a principal in another secondary school.
- Yoo Ah Min as an elderly lady who is a victim of a stolen necklace caused by Tom and Chengcai.
- Dr. Winston Hwang as Mr. David Goh, a principal in another secondary school.

== Production ==
After the release of the prequel film, a sequel was suggested, but Neo had difficulty finding a suitable topic. His inspiration was a book on appreciation education, a method of teaching developed by Chinese educator Zhou Hong. Through the film, Neo hoped to capture the culture of Singapore at the turn of the millennium, and to explore the issue of poor parent-child communication.

Neo and Rebecca Leow co-wrote the script, which was completed in May 2005. This film was produced by Raintree Pictures on a budget of S$1.5 million. Shanghai Film Studio had agreed to co-produce this film with Raintree Pictures, but backed out because they found the film too liberal. The production crew included Daniel Yun as executive producer, Chan Pui Yin and Seah Saw Yan as producers, Ardy Lam as cinematographer and Mo Ju Li as sound editor. Besides writing and directing, Neo also starred as Steven Yeo and composed the theme song, which was sung by Hong Junyang.

Filming took place at Saint Hilda's Primary School, Presbyterian High School and other locations during the school holidays in June 2005. Neo hired real gangsters to act in several gangster scenes as he was dissatisfied with the extras. According to him, communicating with the gangsters was difficult, but when he decided to apply the lessons from the film and praised them for a good take, they reacted well. Several members of the cast also said that this film inspired them to communicate better with their family members. On 26 January 2006, distributor United International Pictures released the film on 36 screens in Singapore.

== Reception ==
With earnings of over S$1.41 million in the first six days, this film set a record for the biggest opening for a Singaporean film. The film rose to the top of the local box office, beating Jet Li's Fearless. In total, this film grossed over S$4 million, becoming Singapore's second-highest-grossing film after Money No Enough. The film was then released in Malaysia, where it made RM1.1 million, and Hong Kong, taking in HK$3.1 million. Following the success of the original and this film, Neo announced plans to make more sequels, as well as a remake set in China.

This film was well received when it was showcased at the Cannes Film Festival. It was also one of six Singaporean films screened at the Singapore Season film festival in China. At the 2006 Moscow International Film Festival for Children and Youth, this film captured the Children's Jury Award. The film was also nominated for Best Asian Film at the Hong Kong Film Awards, but lost to Riding Alone for Thousands of Miles.

Critics praised this film for its touching portrayal of the problems faced by Singaporean teenagers. According to a review in the South China Morning Post, the film "presents a candid portrait of Singaporean society at odds with its stereotypically squeaky clean image". Nie Peng of Shenzhen Daily felt the film "captured the emotional depth and effectively conveyed the underlying theme of generation gaps", while movieXclusive.com reviewer Jolene Tan called it "a good local movie that will have [viewers] laughing in stitches and crying at certain points". However, this film was also panned for being overly preachy: a reviewer for The Hindu said that the film "feels like a public service program written by Singapore's social welfare department". Geoffrey Eu, a reviewer for The Business Times, commented that it "takes the line that the viewer needs to be clubbed into submission rather than persuaded via a more subtle line of reasoning".

== Sequel and remake ==
A serialised version of the film titled the same way as I Not Stupid Too was aired on Mediacorp Channel 8 and was released on 23 September 2006 and ended its run on 16 December 2006. It consisted of 13 episodes with new characters introduced in the TV series. The TV series continues from the events in this film, with a time lapse in between.

A Malay language remake titled Aku Tak Bodoh (the translation of the title of the first film) was made as a Malaysian co-production with Grand Brilliance. The film stars Jalaluddin Hassan and Adibah Noor among others, and was released on 2 December 2010 in Malaysian cinemas.

A sequel, I Not Stupid 3, began production in June 2023 and was released on 6 June 2024 during the school holidays in Singapore.
