= Collin Chee =

Singaporean businessman and actor (born 1967)

- Born: 24 January 1967 (age 59); Singapore
- Other names: Colin Chee; Qian Hanqun; Qian Changjun
- Education: St. Teresa's High School
- Occupations: Businessman; actor; former football manager; football coach; model; radio DJ; writer
- Years active: 1993−present
- Spouse: Irene Rahardja (m. 1997; div. 2020)
- Children: 4
- Modeling information
- Height: 1.81 m (5 ft 11 1/2 in)

Stage name
- Traditional Chinese: 錢昶均
- Simplified Chinese: 钱昶均
- Hanyu Pinyin: Qián Chǎngjūn

Birth name
- Traditional Chinese: 錢翰群
- Simplified Chinese: 钱翰群
- Hanyu Pinyin: Qián Hànqún

Collin Chee (born 24 January 1967) is a Singaporean businessman, actor and former Singapore national football team assistant manager.

== Early life and education ==
Chee is of Hainanese descent. He has a sister who is three years younger. His father was a restaurant manager and his mother, a homemaker who used to run a hair salon.

Chee was educated at St. Teresa's High School where he took his N-levels. In his teenage years, Chee was an aspiring football player. While he was advised not to pursue the sport competitively due to childhood asthma, he has played club football for Labrador Juniors in the Singapore National Football League.

== Career ==
=== Media career ===
Upon finishing National Service, he did some modelling and ran a modelling agency before becoming a finalist in SBC's Star Search in 1993.

Chee left showbiz in 1996 after making headlines a year prior for his controversial performance in the local series The Teochew Family. In an interview several years later, Chee recalled that he had "screwed up big time" and once had to repeat a scene for more than 30 times until a cameraman from Hong Kong shouted at him in Cantonese - "What's wrong with you? Film all finished up already!" (sic). His co-star, late veteran Hong Kong actor Kenneth Tsang, was also "super" critical of him to the press upon the release of the series. Chee also revealed that on the set, Tsang had initiated conversations with him and questioned him if he had any intention to make acting his lifelong vocation at that point in time.

Chee then switched his focus to running Talents and Models, a sports event company which was converted from a modelling company, and Wembley Steak House, a football concept restaurant that was located in Northpoint Shopping Centre. He also co-hosted two Mandarin programmes on NTUC Radioheart with Lin Youfa and Renee Yip and made occasional guest appearances on Capital 95.8FM to speak on soccer, and was a part-time football columnist for Lianhe Wanbao.

On 20 June 2023, it was announced that Chee was cast in the film I Not Stupid 3, directed by Jack Neo. He will also appear in the Kelvin Sng film King of Hawkers, scheduled to be released during Chinese New Year in 2024.

=== Football career ===
Around 1993, Chee was also Singapore national football team's assistant manager on a volunteer basis and coached football at Chung Cheng High School (Main) and St. Gabriel's Secondary School, and was also the assistant secretary of the Singapore Soccer Coaches Association.

In the late 1990s, he was president of Tampines Rovers in the National Football League (NFL) Division One and a council member of the Football Association of Singapore (FAS). He also managed the Singapore National Under-19 squad and coached soccer at Temasek Polytechnic. In 1999, he left FAS and dissolved his business ventures. Shortly after, he established TouchWood, an official football pub for Liverpool F.C. supporters located at Maxwell Road, and launched Football Update (足球至尊), a bilingual magazine that published tips for punters which ended its operations in 2006.

In the 2000s, Chee was involved in the controversial Sporting Afrique venture, which was proposed by him to Ho Peng Kee, then Football Association of Singapore president. The team was made up of players with African descent to participate in the 2006 S.League but the players allegedly received ill-treatment where a local media outlet labelled the venture as "slavery". Chee later had to turn to bank loans and mortgaging his house in order to keep the club afloat. The club was eventually rejected by the FAS to participate in the 2007 S.League and subsequently dissolved.

In August 2015, Chee was asked by a former footballer from Tampines Rovers FC to set up a football team for the movement Dads for Life, which he managed and launched in June 2016.

=== Business career ===
In 2007, Chee decided to leave the football scene and later began a job at an international headhunting firm, SearchWorks. He left after almost three years and moved to Medan, Sumatra, Indonesia in 2009, working in the marketing department of food distribution company PT Alamjaya Wirasentosa.

In recent years, he started Spikes of Love with his two sons, which organises outings for people to sample durians together.

Chee was a partner with international trade company Alliance Experts from August 2017 to January 2019.

== Personal life ==
Chee resided in Medan in Sumatra, Indonesia for six years, from 2009 to 2015, to help managed his father-in-law's food business.

In November 2016, he released an autobiography book, Roots - Memoirs From Two Cities, a collection of 21 short stories about his life and experiences in Singapore and abroad.

Chee was married to Indonesian-Chinese Irene Rahardja, a public administration officer, from 1997 to 2020. They have two sons and two daughters.

In an interview in October 2023, Chee revealed that he has been in a relationship with a Ipoh-born finance consultant since 2021, who is also divorced and has two sons.

He plays badminton and is a durian lover.

== Filmography ==
Chee has appeared in the following television series and films:

=== Television series ===
- That Moment In Time (1993)
- Twin Bliss (1993)
- Dr Justice (1994)
- Dreams Come True (1994)
- The Teochew Family (1995)
- Dr Justice II (1995)
- Beyond Dawn (1995)
- Of Cops And Men (1996)
- The Stratagem (2001)Bryan
- The Gentlemen (2016)

=== Film ===
- The Strike Back (1994; telemovie)
- War Roses (1996; telemovie)
- Dark Obsession (1996)
- Second Chance (2016; short film)
- I Not Stupid 3 (2024)
- King of Hawkers (2024)

== Bibliography ==
- Roots - Memoirs From Two Cities (2016)
