= Homerun (film) =

- Theatrical release poster
- Directed by: Jack Neo
- Written by: Jack Neo
- Produced by: Titus Ho; Chan Pui Yin
- Starring: Shawn Lee; Megan Zheng; Xiang Yun; Huang Wenyong
- Cinematography: Kane Chen
- Edited by: Lawrence Ang
- Music by: Li Yi; Redwan Ali
- Production company: Mediacorp Raintree Pictures
- Release date: 7 August 2003
- Running time: 108 minutes
- Country: Singapore
- Languages: Mandarin; English
- Budget: S$1.5 million
- Box office: S$2.3 million

Homerun (Chinese: 跑吧孩子; pinyin: Pǎo bà Hái Zǐ) is a 2003 Singaporean period film and comedy film. A remake of the award-winning Iranian film Children of Heaven, it is a film about two poor siblings and their adventures over a lost pair of shoes. Set in 1965, the year Singapore separated from Malaysia, and satirises the political relations between the two countries, leading to its banning in Malaysia.

The film was written and directed by Singaporean filmmaker Jack Neo, and produced by Mediacorp Raintree Pictures. It stars Shawn Lee, Megan Zheng, Xiang Yun and Huang Wenyong. Filming took place in the rural outskirts of Greater Kuala Lumpur (in Sungai Muntoh village, Jelebu, Negeri Sembilan, Malaysia) during November and December 2002, but post-production delays pushed back the film's release date.

Released in cinemas on 7 August 2003, the film grossed over S$2.3 million during its nine-week box office run. It was nominated for two awards at the 2003 Golden Horse Awards; Zheng, then 10 years old, became the first Singaporean to win a Golden Horse. Generally, however, critical reception of the film was mixed.

== Plot ==
In 1965, two poor Singaporean children, Chew Kiat Kun and his younger sister Chew Seow Fang live with their mother who is late in her third pregnancy and their father who is in debt to a local rice merchant and provision shop owner. The children make the best of what little they have, while their father works long hours doing odd jobs.

The family's problems are compounded when Kiat Kun accidentally loses Seow Fang's only pair of shoes after taking them to be repaired. The children conduct a frantic search but find nothing; a karung guni man had claimed the shoes as unwanted rubbish. The Chew siblings are frustrated and rendered helpless by the situation until their father inspires Kiat Kun to share his shoes with his sister, trading off between classes so they can both attend school. Unfortunately, this plan brings additional problems: Seow Fang is chastised for wearing oversized shoes to school, while Kiat Kun is repeatedly late as he must wait for his sister to exchange shoes with him.

At school, a wealthy schoolmate of Kiat Kun's named Tan Beng Soon runs an amateur soccer team with his friends. Kiat Kun and his friends strike a bargain with Beng Soon to play on the team using the other boys' soccer shoes, in exchange for helping them cheat on their homework. However, the boys quarrel, causing an angry Beng Soon to renege on the deal and remove Kiat Kun and his friends from the team.

Without their assistance, Beng Soon and his friends are punished for producing substandard homework. Although the boys try to resolve their differences, they eventually give up on reaching an agreement, and Beng Soon's mathematics results continue to fall, which resulted his Form Teacher named Mrs. Ang to persuade his father and mother Mr. Tan and Mrs. Tan down to school to witness Beng Soon's private caning inside the staff room before his parents scolded him for his poor performance in studies in school due to football training. His father ultimately decided to send him away to study in England. Kiat Kun, on the other hand, is often late, so the Principal decides to expel him, but he was accepted again thanks to his Form Teacher who coincidentally happens to be their defense, acknowledging his dire family background.

Meanwhile, Seow Fang sees her classmate wearing her lost shoes to school. She and Kiat Kun follow the girl home, but after realising her father is blind and that her family was in a more dire situation than theirs, they decide not to reclaim the shoes. However, a few days later, Seow Fang notices that her classmate is wearing a new pair; upon confronting her, she discovers that the girl has discarded the old pair at the Village garbage dump. The Chew siblings frantically search the garbage dump for her shoes, but only discover them as they are destroyed during a trade unionist riot against a police officer.

The climax of the film, in which Kiat Kun is pushed to the limit but trips and finishes first — a parallel to Singapore's political history.

Kiat Kun is dejected until he learns that the third prize in the 1965 National Primary School Cross Country Competition is a pair of shoes. Because he was sick on the day his school selected representatives for the race, he pleads with his P.E. teacher to let him enter. The P.E. teacher, initially reluctant, relents when Kiat Kun rushes to get his cough medicine, demonstrating his running ability. As the competition begins, Kiat Kun notices that Beng Soon is also participating.

Once the starting gun fires, Kiat Kun pushes himself to the limit and eventually establishes himself among the lead runners. Kiat Kun appears assured of third place, but unexpectedly trips over a stone and thus finishes first. Beng Soon ends the race in third place. While Kiat Kun is running, Mrs Chew goes into labor, forcing Seow Fang to run across a long path littered with broken glass to find a midwife. Finally, Mrs Chew gives birth to a baby boy, and the birth happened right on the same day Singapore became independent from Malaysia, and some time later, Beng Soon gives Kiat Kun and Seow Fang new pairs of shoes before departing for London, as a sign of reconciliation between him and the siblings.

== Cast ==
- Shawn Lee as Chew Kiat Kun
- Megan Zheng as Chew Seow Fang
- Xiang Yun as Mrs. Chew
- Huang Wenyong as Mr. Chew
- Joshua Ang as Tan Beng Soon
- Huang Po Ju as Fatty, Kiat Kun's Best Friend and Classmate
- Ashley Leong as Little Red Dot, Kiat Kun's Best Friend and Classmate
- Ho Wen Long as Tan Seow Hay, Kiat Kun's Best Friend and Classmate
- Jed Tay as Ah Lai, Beng Soon's Best Friend and Classmate
- Xiao Li Yuan as Ah Guang, Beng Soon's Best Friend and Classmate
- Boon Hui Lu as Seow Fang's Classmate
- Patricia Mok as Mrs. Ang, Beng Soon's Form Teacher
- Sharon Au as Seow Fang's Form Teacher
- Marcus Chin as Kiat Kun's Form Teacher
- Mark Lee as Kiat Kun's Physical Education Teacher
- Richard Low as Local Rice Merchant and Provision Shop Owner
- Selena Tan as Midwife, the Chew family's best friend and neighbour who also helps Mrs. Chew give birth to another 3rd child
- Jimmy Nah as Shoe Retail Shop Assistant who attends to Kiat Kun and Seow Fang
- Jack Neo as Beng Soon's Father
- Pheona Lee as Beng Soon's Mother
- John Cheng as Rioter during the Riot in the 1960s
- Wakin Chau as Police officer attending to the riot by stopping it

== Production and distribution ==
Jack Neo's inspiration for this film was the 1997 Iranian film known as Children of Heaven, and while watching it, he and his wife were moved to "holding hands and crying after seeing the love shared by the children". He then decided to adapt the 1997 Iranian film to a 1960s Singaporean kampong setting, to emphasise the messages of friendship and kinship, in which he named the film known as Homerun. This film was produced by Raintree Pictures on a budget of S$1.5 million. It was shot on 35mm film. The production crew included Titus Ho as executive producer; Chan Pui Yin and Daniel Yun as producers; Kane Chen as cinematographer and Lawrence Ang as film editor. In addition to writing and directing, Neo also penned the lyrics to the theme song, which was sung by Koh Mei Xian and composed by Li Yi. Filming took place in the rural outskirts of Sungai Muntoh during November and December 2002. The cast endured a rigorous schedule, including extensive travel times to the filming location and many running scenes. The child actors' school commitments made the planning of reshoots difficult; moreover, the production team decided to delay post-production work in Thailand due to the SARS outbreak.

On 7 August 2003, distributor United International Pictures released the film in 37 theatres, at the time a record for a Singaporean film. The film's worldwide theatrical distribution was carried out by the production company, Mediacorp Raintree Pictures, while the Hong Kong screenings were carried out by Golden Scene. A Chinese language version was released as both a two-disc VCD and one-disc DVD by Panorama Entertainment, one of the Hong Kong-based "mainstays" of independent film distribution.

== Political commentary ==
Kiat Kun's friends and Beng Soon's friends arguing after an agreement is reneged on, in a political allusion.

Elements of this film compare and contrast Singapore's situations in 1965 and in 2003. For example, while Mrs Chew is giving birth, the first Prime Minister of Singapore, Lee Kuan Yew, where his voice can be heard on a radio in the background, announcing Singapore's separation from Malaysia. Other events in the film parallel those in Singapore's history, such as the riot at the rubbish dump alluding to the labour strikes and riots of the 1960s, as well as the threat of terrorism in the new millennium. One of Kiat Kun's friends is nicknamed "Little Red Dot", a phrase used by former Indonesian president Jusuf Habibie to disparage Singapore. The final scene in the film shows the Chew siblings standing before a long muddy path, which symbolises the uncertainty faced by both the newly independent nation in 1965 and the country in transition in 2003.

A number of scenes in this film contain references to political disputes between Singapore and Malaysia. The water dispute is portrayed by Kiat Kun (Singapore) quarrelling with Beng Soon (Malaysia) over the right to draw water from the kampung well. In another scene, one of Kiat Kun's friends produces a sheet of paper with details of the deal Beng Soon reneged on, prompting one of Beng Soon's friends to remark that this was like "writing a letter to a girlfriend and revealing it to the world". This echoes a comment made by the then Malaysian Prime Minister Mahathir Mohamad, comparing Singapore's disclosure of letters between the two countries to "revealing letters sent to one's girlfriend".

When asked about the references, Neo said he would "leave the movie open to interpretation, which will make it more mysterious and beautiful". Nevertheless, Malaysian censors decided to ban the screening of this film in Malaysia, citing scenes that will "bring about negative elements and bad examples to education". Raintree filed an appeal, arguing that the positive messages in the film were more salient than the political satire, but it was unsuccessful. Malaysian moviegoers polled by Life! and the China Press expressed disappointment with the ban, calling it "unnecessary" and stated a desire to watch the film via unlicensed VCD.

== Reception ==
Having earned S$110,300 from sneak previews, and the film made S$610,400 over the National Day weekend, achieving the most successful opening weekend for a local film. It rose to the top of the local box office, beating American blockbusters such as Lara Croft: Tomb Raider. In total, the film grossed more than S$2.3 million over nine weeks of screenings, the second longest box office run for the year.

Critical reception of this film was mixed. Sanjuro of LoveHKFilm.com wrote that the film "succeeds in delivering a relatively simple, intimate story that should prove moving for even the most jaded audience", while Nick England of the San Diego Asian Film Foundation described this film as "a film with certain beauteous qualities that we can genuinely enjoy, but end up choking on when it is all over with". In contrast, FilmsAsia reviewer Soh Yun-Huei panned its use of political satire, which she felt "[causes] the film to be devoid of innocence and replaced with a sense of agenda and manipulation".

The film won several awards, including the Grand Prix Prize at the 2003 Golden Swan Awards, the Golden Butterfly Prize for Best Direction at the Isfahan International Children's Film Festival, and a trio (Best Director, Best Newcomer, and People's Choice Award) at the Montreal World Film Festival. It also received two nominations at the 2003 Golden Horse Awards, for Best Theme Song (拥有) and Best New Performer. Megan Zheng, then 10 years old, became the first Singaporean to win a Golden Horse Award, sharing her Best New Performer award with Wang Baoqiang of Blind Shaft.

== See also ==
- Children of Heaven, a 1997 Iranian film.
- Bumm Bumm Bole, a 2010 Indian Hindi adaptation of Children of Heaven.
- Akka Kuruvi, a 2022 Indian Tamil film, and another adaptation of Children of Heaven.
