= Jimmy Nah =

- Born: Jimmy Nah Khim See; 13 April 1967; Singapore
- Died: 4 January 2008 (aged 40); Singapore
- Burial place: Mandai Crematorium and Columbarium
- Occupations: Actor, comedian
- Years active: 1990–2008

Chinese name
- Traditional Chinese: 藍顉嘻
- Simplified Chinese: 蓝钦喜
Transcriptions
Standard Mandarin
- Hanyu Pinyin: Lán Qīnxǐ
Yue: Cantonese
- Jyutping: lam1 jam1 hei2
- Musical career
- Also known as: MC King, MC Nah Khim See

Jimmy Nah Khim See (Chinese: 蓝钦喜; pinyin: Lán Qīnxǐ; (13 April 1967 – 4 January 2008), better known by his nickname "MC King", was a Singaporean comedian and actor. He died of heart and lung failure at the age of 40.

== Early life and career ==
Nah entered the entertainment industry in 1990 after completing the Singapore Broadcasting Corporation (SBC) drama training course. He made his debut in a drama series titled Friends Next Door. He played a character who was perennially on medical leave (getting a medical chit), thus earning him his nickname.

Nah also hosted Comedy Nite along with Jack Neo, Moses Lim and Mark Lee, and acted in a couple of local movies, including Jack Neo's I Not Stupid, Homerun and I Not Stupid Too, as well as a number of local drama serials.

In 1996, after the completion of his contract with Television Corporation of Singapore (formerly known as SBC), Nah became a disc jockey with UFM100.3.

== Death ==
On the morning of 4 January 2008, Nah was rushed to hospital after he experienced breathing difficulties & hyper ventilating in his home at Old Airport Road. He died at around 13:00 hours at Tan Tock Seng Hospital at the age of 40.

A MediaCorp report said its not known if the well-known actor had suffered from any health problems. In his last entry, he posted on his blog on New Year's Eve, he had wished for good health in the coming year and for the renewal of his MediaCorp contract. His death certificate stated the cause of death as heart and lung failure.

Nah was cremated at Mandai Crematorium on 6 January 2008, following a funeral. Nah is survived by his brother.

== Filmography ==
=== Television programmes ===
Year	Title	Role	Notes	Ref
1990	Comedy Night/Nite 搞笑行动		Variety Show	
1990	Friends Next Door 我爱芳邻	MC King	Sitcom	
1990	Wishing Well 幻海奇遇 之《六尺儿童》	Lin Da Xiong (Da Niu) 林大雄 (大牛)		
1991	Fatal Endearment 谍海危情	Fat Chef 胖厨	Cameo	
1991	From Heaven To Earth 七彩人间	Bai Wu Chang 白无常		
1991	Behind Bars 铁狱雷霆	Du Ming Hua 杜明华		
1991	The Last Swordsman 最后一个大侠	Hua Gong Gong 华公公		
1991	The Other Woman 醋劲100	Thomas		
1991	The Future is Mine 锦绣前程	Yang Dong Dong 杨东东		
1992	Woman of Substance 悲欢岁月	A-Cheng 阿成		
1992	Changing Fortunes 爱情乒乓球	Jerry	Cameo	
1992	Between Friends 山水喜相逢	Chen Xiao Yi 陈晓义		
1992	Crazy Chase 富贵也疯狂	Li Yi Wen 李益文		
1992	The Male Syndrome 妙男正传	TV Host 主持人	Cameo	
1992	Love Is In The Air 爱在女儿乡	Ben		
1992	Mystery II 迷离夜II 之《不死咒》	Peter 彼得		
1992	Mystery II 迷离夜II 之《问我是谁》	David 大卫		
1993	Heavenly Beings 再战封神榜	A-Bao 阿保		
1993	Reaching for the Stars 银海惊涛			
1993	Sister Dearest 傻妹俏娇娃	Customer 顾客	Cameo	
1993	Ride The Waves 卿本佳人	A-Mu 阿木		
1993	Invincible Warriors 皇朝铁将金粉情	Da Feng He Ri Li 大风和日丽		
1993	Happy Foes 欢喜冤家	Police 警员		
1993	The Witty Advisor 金牌师爷	Shi JIn Cheng 石金成		
1993	The Wilful Siblings 斗气姐妹	Private Detective 私家侦探	Cameo	
1993	Happy Reunion 年年有鱼	Old Woman 老太婆		
1994	Young Justice Bao 侠义包公	Ding Da Bing 丁大炳		
1994	Shadow In The Dark 一号凶宅	Wang A-Bing 王阿炳		
1994	The Magnate 叱咤风云	John 约翰		
1995	Neighbourhood Heroes 大英雄小人物	Xiao Zong 小宗		
1995	Strange Encounters III 奇缘III 之《灶神》	Chen Wan Zhong 陈望重		
1995	Strange Encounters III 奇缘III 之《青衣魅影》	Eunuch Zhao 招公公		
1995	Dream Hunters 追心一族	Zeng Chao Qun 曾超群		
1995	Project B "B"计划	Ding Qi Peng 丁启朋		
1996	The Legends of Ji Gong 活佛济公			
1996	Triad Justice 飞越珍珠坊	Fei Mao 肥猫		
1997	Love in a Foreign City 富贵双城	Kingkong		
2004	Spice Siblings	Fang Ya Zong 方亚宗		
2006	Women of Times	Hong Hai 洪海		
2007	Let It Shine	Bao Pei Shuang 包培双		
2007	Happily Ever After	Celestial Dog 哮天犬		
2007	Like Father, Like Daughter	Da Zhi Lao 大只佬		
2007	Honour and Passion	Mike		
2007	Live Again	Zhang You Yi 张友义		
2008	Taste of Love	Yu Du Zhong 余杜仲		
2008	Just in Singapore	San Wan 三万	Posthumous release	

=== Films ===
Year	Title	Role	Notes	Ref
1994	Dark Obsession 疯蝶	Inspector Chen 陈探长	Telemovie	
1995	To Madam with Love 老师的情人	A-Guang 阿光	Telemovie	
1996	Legend of Da Bo Gong 大伯公传奇	God of Fortune (Beggar) 财神（乞丐）	Telemovie	
2002	I Not Stupid	Medium Translator 乩童翻译		
2003	Homerun			
2006	I Not Stupid Too			
2006	The Vietnamese Bride			
