= Mrbrown =

Singaporean blogger

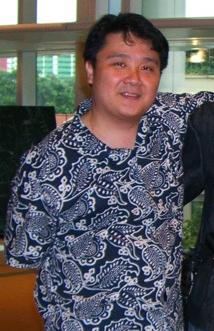
Lee Kin Mun (mrbrown) on 4 September 2005.

Lee Kin Mun (Chinese: 李健敏; pinyin: Lǐ Jiànmǐn), better known as mrbrown or Kim Huat, is a Singaporean blogger best known for publishing satirical social and political commentary despite Singapore's tight media landscape. At his peak during the 2000s, his podcast attracted some 20,000 downloads per day. In 2007, Lee was the only Singaporean to make it to the annual list of Top 20 Asian Progressives in World Business Magazine.

== Education ==
Lee was educated in Anglo-Chinese School and Hwa Chong Junior College.

== Blog ==
mrbrown was one of the earliest Singaporean bloggers having started blogging in 1997. He was also known as the "blogfather" of Singapore.

== Shows ==
- the mrbrown show— is a podcast produced by Lee, created in 2005. It was formerly co-produced by Mr Miyagi, another local blogger, who left the show to pursue other interests. The show features guests from various quarters of Singapore, and parodies a variety of subjects ranging from VISA's advertising campaign starring Richard Gere to political satire. Zhng My Car, a recurring series in the mrbrown show, is a spoof of MTV's Pimp My Ride, and has seen over 100,000 downloads.
- the WTF! show (the "WTF!" is an abbreviation for "Wow, that's Fierce!"), similarly produced and hosted by Lee, is a vodcast that covers the latest in video games, gadgets and technology. Gadgets that have been covered range from mobile phones and headphones to Global Positioning System devices to video games. A common feature of the WTF show includes guests paying a sneaky visit to Lee.
- See What Show is a weekly review podcast produced by Lee which reviews television programs, films and DVD releases. The podcast is billed as "The Movie, TV and DVD review podcast for regular people", and features candid comments about these entertainment mediums by Lee and his guests. The show occasionally makes use of sound clips obtained from distributors of the shows. Contests on the website also revolve around the films and TV shows reviewed, with premiums sponsored by local film distributors as prizes. In December 2009, Lee travelled to Los Angeles to interview the cast and crew of 2012, including Singaporean actor Chin Han. As of December 2009, there have been no new episodes of the podcast.

== Censorship ==
In January 2004, the Ministry of Education (MOE) briefly blocked his website after being labelled as 'extreme'. It was reported Nanyang Polytechnic (NYP) had also blacklisted his site. MOE subsequently lifted the ban after explaining that the ministry filtering service had wrongly classified his website. NYP had subscribed to a filter list and the list had later whitelisted his site.

On 30 June 2006, Lee wrote an article, titled "S'poreans are fed, up with progress!", for his weekly opinion column in the newspaper Today about the rising costs of living in Singapore. Three days later, on 3 July, an official from the Ministry of Information, Communications and the Arts published a reply in the same newspaper calling Lee a "partisan player" whose views "distort the truth". On 6 July, the newspaper suspended his column. Lee subsequently resigned from his own column.

Prime Minister of Singapore Lee Hsien Loong responded to the unhappiness that resulted from MICA's handling of the incident. He stated that "mrbrown had hit out wildly at the Government and in a very mocking tone", and that the government had to respond to such criticisms lest they be taken by the public as true. He also stated that national issues should not be debated in such a fashion (referring to Lee's article). The prime minister maintained that Singapore was an open society.

== Filmography ==
- Ah Boys to Men 2 (2013) as LTA S T Choong
- Downstairs (2019-2023) as Uncle Dong
- I Not Stupid 3 (2024) as the director, CEO and school principal of Xin Yuan Fei Edu Hub, one of the tuition centres in Singapore.
