= I Not Stupid Too (TV series) =

- 小孩不笨2
- Genre: Sitcom
- Created by: Jack Neo
- Written by: Rebecca Leow 洪汐
- Story by: Jack Neo
- Directed by: Lee Li Wan 李丽婉; Loh Woon Woon 罗温温
- Starring: Lee Jiaxun; Shawn Lee; Joshua Ang; Xiang Yun; Ng Suan Loi; Asmiyati binti Asbah; Liu Lingling; Johnny Ng; Natalli Ong Ai Wen; Tan Yong Ming; Nick Shen; Jaime Teo
- Opening theme: 不在懦弱 by Yang Jiehao 杨杰豪 and Xu Huanjie 许环杰
- Ending theme: 孤军作战 by Hong Junyang 洪俊扬
- Country of origin: Singapore
- Original languages: Mandarin; English
- No. of episodes: 13

Production
- Producer: Soh Bee Lian 苏美莲
- Running time: 30 minutes (with commercials)

Original release
- Network: MediaCorp Channel 8
- Release: 23 September – 16 December 2006

I Not Stupid Too (Chinese: 小孩不笨2; pinyin: Xiǎo Hái Bù Bèn 2; lit. 'Children are not stupid 2') was a Singaporean sitcom and the sequel of the hit film I Not Stupid Too. The series ran from 23 September 2006 to 16 December 2006 and was aired on Saturdays at 9pm.

Cast members from the movie including Shawn Lee, Joshua Ang, Xiang Yun, Ng Suan Loi, Asmiyati binti Asbah, Liu Lingling, Johnny Ng, Natalli Ong Ai Wen, Tan Yong Ming and Nick Shen also return for this series and reprise their roles as Tom Yeo, Lim Chengcai, Karen Yeo, Jerry and Tom's Grandmother, Yati being Jerry and Tom's Maid, Yang/Lady Boss, Mr. Fu Dabing, Wang Jingjing, Fatty and Mr. Hao Letian respectively. Film Director for the movie being Jack Neo also reprises his role as Steven Yeo and only appeared in certain episodes of the series.

== Plot ==
The series continues from the events in the film, with a time lapse in between. Similar to the film, Jerry Yeo Xueqiang (Lee Jiaxun) introduces the characters and the situation. Tom Yeo (Shawn Lee) and Lim Chengcai (Joshua Ang) are now in Secondary 4 and about to take their O Levels. This suggests that they both probably did well for their exams in Secondary 3 when they were still studying in the Normal Technical (NT) Level stream in between the events of the film and this series, and therefore they are not required to attend the Normal Academic (NA) Level stream in Secondary 4 and could just jump straight to be in the Express stream and studying O Levels straightaway. Mr. Fu Dabing (Johnny Ng) is still their Form Teacher and Chinese Teacher as well. Steven Yeo (Jack Neo) has been stationed in Shanghai, China for 2 years while Karen Yeo (Xiang Yun) has since quit her full-time job as a Chinese Magazine Editor and taken up part-time job as a Freelance Reporter so she can spend more time with her family.

After his father Mr. Lim (Huang Yiliang) dies due to the old lady's (Yoo Ah Min)'s necklace snatching incident and scuffle, Chengcai returns to school and is determined to study hard so as to not let his father down. He decides to rent his HDB Flat out to earn some extra money. Tom invites him to stay at his semi-detached house. Knowing Karen Yeo will disapprove due to Chengcai's past, Jerry and Tom get friends to help and they devise a creative and elaborate plan to get Karen Yeo to agree. Karen Yeo eventually welcomes Chengcai into their family after he rescues them from a burglar and kidnapper by using his chinese martial arts skills.

In school, Tom and Chengcai are popular students and are often chased by their female schoolmates. Eventually they realize that they both have a crush on the same classmate named Wang Jingjing (Natalli Ong Ai Wen), and their friendship is put to the test. Meanwhile, their English Teacher, Miss Tan (Jaime Teo), falls for their Physical Education Teacher, Mr. Hao Letian (Nick Shen), who seeks help from Fu Dabing and Chengcai in dealing with his shyness.

Chengcai's legal guardian, Yang/Lady Boss (Liu Lingling), often visits the Yeo family. She feeds Jerry and Tom's grandmother (Ng Suan Loi) with speculations of how Karen Yeo and Fu Dabing may be having an affair behind Steven Yeo's back. A small upheaval takes place which is thankfully resolved with the help from Jerry Yeo, Tom Yeo, Lim Chengcai and their friends including Jingjing and Fatty (Tan Yong Ming).

== Cast ==
- Lee Jiaxun 李佳勳 as Jerry Yeo Xueqiang 杨学强: The younger brother of the Yeo family and doubled as the series everyman and narrator. Lee replaced Ashley Leong (梁文宗) from the film.
- Shawn Lee 李创锐 as Tom Yeo Xueqian 杨学谦, the older brother of the Yeo family.
- Joshua Ang 洪赐健 as Lim Chengcai 林成才, a close friend of Tom and a good chinese martial arts street fighter.
- Xiang Yun 向云 as Karen Yeo 许秀梅, Jerry and Tom Yeo's Mother.
- Ng Suan Loi as Jerry and Tom Yeo's Grandmother, Karen Yeo's Mother-In-Law and Steven Yeo's Mother.
- Asmiyati binti Asbah as Yati, the maid for the Yeo family.
- Liu Lingling as Yang/Lady Boss 杨肥阿姨, a kopitiam owner and Chengcai's legal guardian.
- Johnny Ng 黄家强 as Mr. Fu Dabing 符大炳, Tom and Chengcai's Form Teacher and Chinese Teacher in the Secondary 4 Express stream.
- Natalli Ong Ai Wen 王爱雯 as Wang Jingjing 王晶晶, Tom and Chengcai's classmate and love interest under Mr. Fu Dabing's class in the Secondary 4 Express stream.
- Tan Yong Ming 陈勇铭 as Fatty 小胖, Tom and Chengcai's classmate and good friend under Mr. Fu Dabing's class in the Secondary 4 Express stream.
- Nick Shen 沈炜竣 as Mr. Hao Letian 郝乐天, Tom and Chengcai's Physical Education Teacher in the Secondary 4 Express stream.
- Jaime Teo 赵彩菱 as Miss Tan 陈洁, Tom and Chengcai's English Teacher in the Secondary 4 Express stream.
- Jack Neo as Steven Yeo, Jerry and Tom Yeo's Father.

== Production ==
The series was directed by Lee Li Wan (李丽婉) and Loh Woon Woon (罗温温) and was produced by Soh Bee Lian (苏美莲). Neo remained as the story creator.

Like the previous film I Not Stupid, a sitcom version of the original film was written and produced, but the storyline was the same but with a deeper story, newly added scenes and also certain changes. Filming took place in River Valley Primary School, Kranji Secondary School and other locations during school holidays. Same likewise for The Best Bet as well, where the success of the film spawned a television series of the same name which aired on MediaCorp Channel 8 in April 2005 and ran for 14 episodes, and the storyline was slightly different with newly added characters who did not appear in the movie.

While I Not Stupid Too Movie focused more on the protagonists' relationships with their families, the series focuses on some of the other everyday idiosyncrasies of a teenager's life such as crushes, addiction to mobile phones, sibling rivalry and friendship. The boys have also matured since the events in the film and have a better relationship with their teachers, especially Mr. Fu Dabing. In general the series is more light-hearted than the film, and relies on an episodic structure.

== Soundtrack ==
The theme song, "孤军作战", sung by Hong Junyang, became the ending theme song for the series

"不再懦弱" sung by Yang Jiehao (杨杰豪) and Xu Huanjie (许环杰) is the theme song for the series.
