= Daniel Yun =

Singaporean veteran film producer

Daniel Yun (traditional Chinese: 雲暉翔; simplified Chinese: 云晖翔; pinyin: Yun Huixiang) is a Singaporean veteran film producer.

Yun grew up in a kampung off Geylang Road and his parents were Hainanese immigrants. He was educated at one of Singapore premier boys’ schools, Victoria School.

He joined Singapore Broadcasting Corporation Radio as vice-president of Radio Sales in 1991 and became head of Programming in 1992. He was the head of Marketing Communications, and Programming and Acquisition departments for Television Corporation of Singapore (TCS) in 1994.

In 1998, Yun became the vice-president of Production 5 at TCS. In the same year, he became the CEO of Mediacorp Raintree Pictures.

In 2015, Yun co-produced, co-wrote and co-directed 1965 (2015). In 2016, Daniel founded Blue3 Asia with the YDM Global Company.

== Filmography ==
=== Raintree Pictures ===
- The Truth About Jane and Sam (1999)
- I Not Stupid (2002)
- The Eye (2002)
- Turn Left, Turn Right (2003)
- Infernal Affairs II (2003)
- The Maid (2005)
- One Last Dance (2006)
- 881 (2007)
- The Tattooist (2007)
- The Home Song Stories (2007)
- Protégé (2007)
- Painted Skin (2008)

=== Homerun Asia ===
- Aftershock (2010)
- Under The Hawthorne Tree (2010)
- The Lady (2011)
- Homecoming (2011)
- My Dog Dou Dou (2012)

=== Blue3 Pictures ===
- 1965 (2015)
