= Huang Po Ju =

Taiwanese-born Singaporean actor

Eric Huang
- Born: Eric Huang Po Ju; 4 October 1990 (age 34); Taichung, Taiwan
- Citizenship: Taiwan
- Occupation: Actor
- Years active: 2001–2007

Chinese name
- Traditional Chinese: 黄柏儒
- Simplified Chinese: 黃柏儒
Transcriptions
Standard Mandarin
- Hanyu Pinyin: Huáng Bòrú

Eric Huang Po Ju (simplified Chinese: 黄柏儒; traditional Chinese: 黃柏儒; pinyin: Huáng Bòrú, born 4 October 1990) is a Taiwan former actor, most notable for his role as Terry Khoo in the Singaporean successful film known as I Not Stupid.

== Early life ==
Huang was born in Taichung, Taiwan, and moved to Singapore at an early age. He was cast alongside Shawn Lee and Joshua Ang in the film I Not Stupid, in 2002, after his school encouraged him to. His appearance in the sitcom version earned the three nominations for Best Young Actor at the 2002 Star Awards. Huang next starred in Homerun, working with Lee and Ang once more. He and Lee filmed their last movie in the J-Team produced film Colour of Hope before leaving the entertainment industry and returning to Taiwan and staying there to continue his studies in secondary school and university in his native country and did not return to Singapore.

== Personal life ==
Huang attended United World College of South East Asia. He returned back to Taiwan and formerly studied Risk Management and Insurance and MBA at National Chengchi University.

== Filmography ==
Year	Movie	Role
2002	I Not Stupid (小孩不笨)	Terry Khoo
2003	Homerun (跑吧 ! 孩子)	Fatty
2003	My Teacher, My Friend	Huang Renxi
2005	One More Chance (三个好人)	Kwong's new boss
2007	Colour Of Hope (再见阳光)	Hui 梁家辉

== Awards and nominations ==
The Star Awards are presented by Mediacorp.

Star Awards – Acting Awards
Year	Category	Nominated work	Result
2002	Young Talent Award	I Not Stupid	Nominated
