= Shawn Lee (actor) =

Singaporean actor

- Born: Shawn Lee Chuang Rui; 11 February 1990 (age 35); Singapore
- Occupation: Actor
- Years active: 1999–2012

Chinese name
- Traditional Chinese: 李創銳
- Simplified Chinese: 李创锐
Transcriptions
Standard Mandarin
- Hanyu Pinyin: Li Chuàngruì

Shawn Lee Chuang Rui (simplified Chinese: 李创锐; traditional Chinese: 李創銳; pinyin: Li Chuàngruì; born 11 February 1990), is a Singaporean who formerly worked as an actor. He first came into prominence for his award-winning performance alongside his friend and co-star Joshua Ang in the box office hit I Not Stupid. and its sequel, I Not Stupid Too.

== Career ==
Lee first joined his acting career in 1999. He acted as a primary school student along with deceased actor Aloysius Pang in My Teacher, My Buddy.

In 2002, he was one of four child actors who successfully auditioned for the child lead roles in Jack Neo's hit film I Not Stupid. His performance in the sitcom adaptation earned him a nomination for the Best Young Talent award, which he won, along with co-stars Joshua Ang and Huang Po Ju at the 2002 Star Awards. He would continue starring alongside them in Neo's next successful period film Homerun and also the sequel to I Not Stupid, known as I Not Stupid Too respectively. He filmed his last movie alongside Huang in 2007 known as Colour of Hope before leaving the entertainment industry to concentrate on his A Levels.

Lee made a brief return to acting in Neo's new film We Not Naughty, which was released in conjunction with Chinese New Year 2012 and features former I Not Stupid and I Not Stupid Too co-stars Ang and Xiang Yun.

== Personal life ==
Lee studied at Unity Primary School, Bukit Panjang Government High School and subsequently completed his A Levels at Anglo-Chinese Junior College. Lee graduated with a business degree at the National University of Singapore.

== Filmography ==
=== Films ===
Year	Movie	Role	Notes	Ref
2002	I Not Stupid	Liu Kok Pin 刘国彬		
2003	Homerun	Chew Kiat Kun 周杰坤		
2006	I Not Stupid Too	Tom Yeo 杨学谦		
2007	Colour Of Hope 再见阳光	Orange Light/Liu Chengguang		
2012	We Not Naughty	Chen Weijie		

=== Television ===
Year	Movie	Role	Notes	Ref
1999	My Teacher, My Buddy	unknown		
2001	Beyond the Axis of Truth	Chen Xueming (younger)		
2002	I Not Stupid	Liu Kok Pin		
2006	I Not Stupid Too	Tom Yeo		

== Awards and nominations ==
Year	Award	Category	Nominated work	Result	Ref
2002	Star Awards	Young Talent Award	I Not Stupid	Won	
