= Raintree Pictures =

Singaporean film production company

Mediacorp Raintree Pictures (simplified Chinese: 星霖电影; traditional Chinese: 星霖電影; pinyin: Xīnglín Diànyǐng) was a film production company based in Singapore. The company, a division of Mediacorp Group, was established on 1 August 1998. It financed The Truth About Jane and Sam, produced by Hong Kong's Film Unlimited and directed by Derek Yee. This film garnered a Best New Performer nomination at the 19th Hong Kong Film Awards for its lead actress, Fann Wong from Singapore.

The company closed down in 2012.

== History ==
Incorporated on 22 July and established on 1 August 1998, Raintree Pictures was Television Corporation of Singapore's (TCS) subsidiary to produce films. Its first chief executive officer, Daniel Yun, was vice president of Productions 5 at TCS, Channel 5's production unit.

Raintree Pictures co-produced many films with other countries, including The Eye, The Eye 2 and Infernal Affairs II with Hong Kong. Some of its films have won awards, such as the Golden Horse Award for Best New Performer for actress Megan Zheng's performance in Homerun. In 2002, its satirical film I Not Stupid held the top position at the weekend box office chart in Singapore. It was later released in other countries such as Malaysia, Hong Kong and China.

== Films ==
Release date	Film	Notes
11 February 1999	Liang Po Po: The Movie	
8 July 1999	The Truth About Jane and Sam	Co-production with Hong Kong's Film Unlimited
3 February 2000	2000 AD	Co-production with Hong Kong's Media Asia Films
16 November 2000	Chicken Rice War	
26 April 2001	The Tree	
14 November 2001	One Leg Kicking	
9 February 2002	I Not Stupid	
9 May 2002	The Eye	Co-produced with Applause Pictures
7 August 2003	Homerun	
11 September 2003	Turn Left, Turn Right	Co-produced with Warner Bros. Asia
1 October 2003	Infernal Affairs II	Co-produced with Media Asia
8 March 2004	The Eye 2	Co-produced with Applause Pictures
9 June 2004	The Best Bet	
8 February 2005	I Do, I Do	
18 August 2005	The Maid	
26 January 2006	I Not Stupid Too	
11 January 2007	One Last Dance	
13 February 2007	Protégé	Co-produced with Artforce International
9 August 2007	881	
23 August 2007	The Home Song Stories	
9 August 2007	The Tattooist	
7 February 2008	Ah Long Pte Ltd	Co-production with Malaysia
29 February 2008	The Leap Years	
14 August 2008	12 Lotus	
4 September 2008	Rule No. 1	Co-production with Hong Kong's Fortune Star
31 July 2008	Money No Enough 2	Co-production with Jack Neo
25 September 2008	Painted Skin	Co-production with Hong Kong's Golden Sun Films and several Mainland China production companies
30 October 2008	Sing to the Dawn	Animated film; co-production with Indonesia's Infinite Frameworks
25 January 2009	The Wedding Game	Co-production with Malaysia
20 July 2009	Macabre	Co-production with Indonesia
18 March 2010	Kidnapper	
27 January 2011	It's A Great Great World	
19 January 2012	Dance Dance Dragon	Last movie produced by the company
