= I Not Stupid =

2002 Singaporean comedy film directed by Jack Neo

- Theatrical release poster
- Directed by: Jack Neo
- Written by: Jack Neo
- Produced by: David Leong; Chan Pui Yin
- Starring: Huang Po Ju; Shawn Lee; Joshua Ang; Cheryl Desiree Chan; Xiang Yun; Jack Neo; Richard Low; Selena Tan
- Cinematography: Ardy Lam
- Edited by: Yiu-Chung Yeung
- Music by: Li Yi
- Production company: Mediacorp Raintree Pictures
- Distributed by: United International Pictures
- Release date: 9 February 2002 (Singapore)
- Running time: 105 minutes
- Country: Singapore
- Languages: Mandarin; Hokkien; English
- Budget: S$1 million
- Box office: S$3.8 million

I Not Stupid (Chinese: 小孩不笨; pinyin: Xiǎo Hái Bù Bèn; lit. 'Children are not stupid') is a 2002 Singaporean comedy film about the lives, struggles and adventures of three Singaporean Primary 6 pupils who are placed in the academically inferior EM3 stream. (Note: Between 1990 and 2008, primary school students are separated into three tracks based on their academic abilities in English and Mother Tongue (EM) languages in Primary 4. The tracks are known as EM1, EM2, and EM3 with EM3 for students with the poorest academic abilities tested.) Written and directed by Jack Neo, and produced by Mediacorp Raintree Pictures, the film stars Huang Po Ju, Shawn Lee, Joshua Ang, Cheryl Desiree Chan, Xiang Yun, Jack Neo, Richard Low and Selena Tan.

Released in cinemas on 9 February 2002, the film earned over S$3.8 million (US$2.12 million), becoming the second-highest grossing Singaporean film. Its satirical take on the Singaporean education system and social attitudes in Singapore sparked public discussions and parliamentary debates that led to reforms in the education system.

== Plot ==
I Not Stupid follows three Primary 6 students in Singapore's EM3 stream: Terry Khoo (Huang Po Ju), Liu Kok Pin (刘国彬; Liú Guóbīn; Shawn Lee), and Ang Boon Hock (洪文福; Hóng Wénfú; Joshua Ang). Each boy struggles with personal and academic challenges while facing societal pressure, bullying, and family expectations. Terry comes from a wealthy but strict family, with a domineering mother, Mrs. Khoo (Selena Tan), and a neglectful businessman father, Mr Khoo (Richard Low). Kok Pin is pushed by his mother, Mrs. Liu (Xiang Yun), to excel in Mathematics, despite his true talent in art. Boon Hock, raised by his single mother Mrs. Ang (Wong Choi Yeng), helps run their wonton noodle stall and values loyalty and toughness.

The three boys are bullied for being in the "stupid" stream. A fight breaks out when Ang Tiong Meng (Jed Tay), Boon Hock's cousin from the prestigious EM1 stream, mocks them. In a scuffle, Tiong Meng is injured. When questioned by the school's discipline mistress (Patricia Mok), Terry refuses to defend his friends, fearing his mother's disapproval. This strains their friendship.

Meanwhile, their fathers, Mr Khoo and Mr. Liu (Jack Neo), Kok Pin's father, clash over a parking dispute, escalating their animosity. Their animosity deepens when Jerry, managing director of Good Friend Bakkwa, unknowingly rejects Mr. Liu's marketing proposal but accepts the same idea when presented by his American colleague, John (Harlow Russell), highlighting a cultural bias in business. When John steals credit for Mr. Liu's ideas, Mr. Liu and his colleague, Ben (Hossan Leong) challenge him in a competition for a shampoo brand campaign. John wins, leading Mr. Liu and Ben to quit and start their own agency, where they later secure Jerry's business as a client.

As the boys struggle academically, their Mathematics teacher, Miss Lee Su Zhen (Kelly Wen Su Ru), helps them improve. However, Kok Pin, still failing in Math, persuades Boon Hock to help him cheat during exams. They are caught, and Kok Pin, terrified of his mother's reaction, attempts suicide but is saved by the police who have been chasing after a group of teenagers hanging out late in the night—including Terry's rebellious sister, Selena Khoo (Cheryl Desiree Chan). He eventually confesses to his mother, who faints and is diagnosed with leukemia. Doctors reveal she needs a bone marrow transplant to survive.

Soon after, Terry and Boon Hock are kidnapped by two criminals, including a former employee of Jerry's bakkwa company seeking revenge for being fired. Kok Pin recalls their faces and draws sketches to assist the police. Terry and Boon Hock escape and are rescued. Simultaneously, Jerry's business suffers after John's marketing campaign, featuring inappropriate Westernised ads, fails with Singaporean consumers. The company struggles with a pig farm swine flu scare and stock market losses due to the September 11 attacks.

As the school community rallies to find a donor for Mrs. Liu and while Terry's family was submitting their blood samples for testing, Terry's mother absentmindedly allows him to get tested. Initially, Jerry is believed to be the match, but it turns out Terry is the suitable donor. Despite his parents' objections, Terry insists on going through with the transplant, saving Mrs. Liu's life. Grateful, Mr. Liu offers to help Jerry revive his business. With a successful new marketing campaign, Jerry's bakkwa business thrives, and he reconciles with Mr. Liu, forming a friendship. Miss Lee informs Mr. and Mrs. Liu that Kok Pin's artwork won second place in an international competition, and he is encouraged to pursue art studies in the United States. The film ends with Terry, once again bullied at his home. However, this time, he stands up for himself, demonstrating newfound confidence. He reunites with Kok Pin and Boon Hock, reflecting on how their mothers, despite their strictness, only want the best for them.

== Cast ==
- Huang Po Ju as Terry Khoo
- Shawn Lee as Liu Kok Pin
- Joshua Ang as Ang Boon Hock
- Cheryl Desiree Chan as Selena Khoo, Terry's Elder Sister.
- Xiang Yun as Mrs. Liu, Kok Pin's Mother and Mr. Liu's Wife.
- Jack Neo as Mr. Liu, Kok Pin's Father and Mrs. Liu's Husband.
- Richard Low as Mr Khoo, Terry and Selena Khoo's Father, and Mrs Khoo's Husband.
- Selena Tan as Mrs. Khoo, Terry and Selena Khoo's Mother, and Jerry Khoo's Wife.
- Patricia Mok as Terry, Kok Pin and Boon Hock's Primary School Discipline Mistress.
- Hossan Leong as Ben, Mr. Liu's Good Friend, Buddy and Colleague at the Advertising Agency.
- Wong Choi Yeng as Mrs. Ang No. 1, Boon Hock's Mother.
- Jed Tay as Ang Tiong Meng, Boon Hock's Estranged Cousin.
- Lim Kwee Hiok as Mrs. Ang No. 2, Tiong Meng's Mother and Boon Hock's Estranged Aunt.
- Kelly Wen Su Ru as Miss. Lee Su Zhen, Terry, Kok Pin and Boon Hock's Form Teacher.
- Harlow Russell as John, an American Expatriate and also Mr. Liu and Ben's Creative Director of the Advertising Agency.
- Winston Hwang as Mr. Kang, the Boss, CEO and Managing Director of the Advertising Agency.
- Mark Lee as Singaporean Kidnapper.
- John Cheng as the Head/Leader of the S.W.A.T. Police Team.
- Henry Thia as the Barber and Hairstylist at a Beauty Salon attending to Mr. Liu, Ben and their team for their Shampoo Proposal, and also Mr. Liu's Good Friend and Buddy.
- Jimmy Nah as Medium Translator for Mrs. Khoo.
- Jeff Wang as Mr Liu's Taiwanese Colleague at the Advertising Agency.

== Political satire ==
This film criticises many aspects of modern Singaporean culture, including streaming in the education system, deference to authority, and sociocultural stereotypes. The film can be read as an allegory for Singaporean society – the pampered protagonist and narrator, Terry Khoo, is an "everyman"; deferent and coddled, with a domineering mother and affluent father. Terry's intellectual failings lead him to be placed in the inferior EM3 stream, which becomes the driving force behind the storyline. The subsequent stigma placed upon the narrator illustrates how the Singaporean education system promotes academic elitism, with students in lower streams looked down upon as inferior, making it harder for them to catch up and realise their potential (see golem effect), even if they are not necessarily stupid. This kiasu mentality puts mounting pressure upon the protagonists of the film, confounding them as they attempt to improve their standing and ameliorate their reputation in a society which judges them "worthless".

Terry's Mother, Mrs. Khoo, is a "thinly veiled stand-in for the Singapore Government", whose "mother-knows-best" mentality is well-meaning, but strips her children of their freedom. She demands total obedience, and her repeated lines "Do you know how lucky you are to have a good and responsible mother?" and "This is all for your own good" parodies the Government's efforts to convince Singaporeans that government policies and actions is in the best interests of the nation. Mrs. Khoo also uses her position of power to buy off rebellion in her charges with gifts and bribes, in a pointed criticism of the government's social policies. Other characters in the film comment on this relationship – for instance, in one scene, Mr. Liu states that "it is difficult to catch fish in Singapore, because fish in Singapore are like Singaporeans; they'll never open their mouths", poking fun at the Singaporean trait of obedience and respect for authority.

The film also touches on other issues including Chinese self-loathing (wherein Singaporean companies regard American expatriates as inherently superior to Singaporean workers), suicide, the use of Singlish (which was featured in the popular Singaporean local sitcom known as Phua Chu Kang Pte Ltd, where the titular protagonist, white-collar worker and general contractor Phua Chu Kang (Gurmit Singh) was also mentioned by Ben), and the differences between English and Chinese.

== Production ==
After speaking with parents to find topics to discuss in his film, Jack Neo learned that due to problems with the Singaporean education system, specifically streaming, students face considerable academic and emotional stress. This problem formed the core of his film, which he called I Not Stupid in reference to the social stigma that streaming places on students.

Neo also drew on a dissatisfaction he felt with the way the school system promoted deference to authority over self-reliance; he wanted his film to tell youth "If you don't want to change or make a difference, you won't. It's all up to you". In exploring these ideas, Neo spent over two years researching and editing the script — checking scenes for accuracy, verifying facts, and drafting dialogue. Altogether, the work went through thirteen different revisions, and saw over 50 children audition for the lead roles, before Neo decided to send the film into production.

This production was carried out by Raintree Pictures on a budget of S$900,000, sponsored by Bee Cheng Hiang, Yeo Hiap Seng and Sunshine Bakeries. The production crew included Daniel Yun as executive producer, David Leong and Chan Pui Yin as producers, Ardy Lam as cinematographer and Li Yi as music supervisor. In addition to writing and directing, Neo also composed the theme song, which was sung by Chen Guorong. The actual filming took place at Braddell Westlake Secondary School and Westlake Primary School over a period of 24 days, and the film found distribution through Raintree Pictures and United International Pictures.

== Reception ==
This film earned just S$46,000 during a limited sneak preview run, prompting Raintree Pictures to embark on a massive publicity campaign, including invitations for teachers to discuss the film. After showing for four months on 30 screens the film earned S$3.8 million, becoming the second-highest grossing Singaporean film after Money No Enough. Following its success in Singapore, the film was released in Malaysia, Hong Kong, Taiwan and China. The film also screened at the Pusan International Film Festival, Tokyo International Film Festival, the Jakarta International Film Festival and the 2005 Singapore Season cultural exhibition in London. Over 50,000 VCDs of this film were sold and its sole distributor, VideoVan, declared it the "No. 1 selling VCD in Singapore". This claim was disputed by Alliance Entertainment, which said that 70,000 VCDs of Money No Enough were sold, but VideoVan called the comparison inaccurate, as Money No Enough was a mature title, rather than a new release.

Awards that this film won include Best Chinese Film at the Golden Bauhinia Awards and Best Chinese Humanitarian Film at the 2002 Taiwan Golden Torch Awards; the film was also nominated for Best Asian Film at the Hong Kong Film Awards, losing to My Sassy Girl. Critics praised the film for its humour and uniqueness, noting that it touched a raw nerve among Singaporeans. For example, Sanjuro of LoveHKFilm.com wrote, "I Not Stupid covers a variety of serious subjects, but all the while maintains a light comedic touch. Jack Neo [makes this film] a clever, well-crafted social commentary and a damn good film to boot". Other reviewers described this film as "one of the greatest cinematic feats I've had the pleasure of experiencing" and displaying a "simple and yet excellent execution". In contrast, FilmAsia reviewer Soh Yun-Huei, found it "most shocking...that the Singapore censors actually allowed this film through in the first place".

Despite its political satire, the film received a positive response from the Singapore Government, as the then second Prime Minister of Singapore, Goh Chok Tong commended Neo's creative talent during his National Day Rally speech on 18 August 2002. In 2004, Neo was the first local filmmaker to receive a National Day Award, and on 21 October 2005, he and Dick Lee became the first pop culture artists to receive the Cultural Medallion, Singapore's highest arts award. The movie sparked public discussion and parliamentary debate about the negative effects of streaming. In 2004, the Ministry of Education decided to merge the EM1 and EM2 streams, and the EM3 stream was scrapped in 2008.

== Sequels ==
A standalone second installment titled I Not Stupid Too was released on 26 January 2006. Another standalone third installment titled I Not Stupid 3 began production in June 2023 and was released on 6 June 2024 during the school holidays in Singapore. I Not Stupid 3 was also released in Malaysia on 13 June 2024, in China on 16 August 2024 and in Taiwan on 20 September 2024.
