= Homeroom =

Type of administrative class in Primary and Secondary school

A homeroom, tutor group, mentor, form class, form, or advisory is a brief administrative period that occurs in a classroom assigned to a student in primary school and in secondary school. Within a homeroom period or classroom, administrative documents are distributed, attendance is marked, announcements are made, and students are given the opportunity to plan for the day. Such periods also act as a form of pastoral care, where teachers and administrators provide personal, social, or health advice. Homerooms differ in their nature, depending on the country and the specific school. A Homeroom period takes care of the social, emotional and academic wellbeing of a student.

== Homerooms by country ==
=== Afghanistan ===
In Afghanistan, the homeroom concept (نگران) is widely used in schools. The homeroom teacher is responsible for almost everything concerning a homeroom period and classroom. At the start of the school year, it's the homeroom teacher's responsibility to make sure that each student gets relevant textbooks and materials, which are supplied by the government. The teacher is also responsible for the attendance.

=== Argentina ===
Homeroom is a concept that does not exist in Argentinian schools, as a single classroom is often used for all assignments (except for lab work or outdoors exercise). Students usually stay in groups of twenty to forty for at least two years without being reshuffled, and often maintain the same grouping throughout both primary and secondary education, with only the group's room and assigned member of staff changing.

=== Australia ===
Australian homeroom is similar to the US concept but varies from school to school. Some schools do not have homeroom at all, and attendance and announcements are made during the first period of the school day in a "student bulletin", while other schools run a homeroom system which is identical to that run in American schools.

Alternative names for homeroom in Australia are "admin" or "administration," "form", "form-class", "GEL" (Grow, Empower, Learn), "form-period", "advocacy", "roll-call", "DEAR" (drop everything and read) or “Welfare”. Many schools in states as Tasmania, call this period Mentor and occurs in the morning and after lunch. Most schools, as well as having a form-class, also have an "assembly" which is attended by the entire or a group of (e.g. Middle School and Senior School) population of the school. This often entails announcements, advertising for various aspects of school life and listening to or singing along with the national anthem.

In many private schools, usually Catholic schools, homeroom is referred to as "PCG" (pastoral care group) where the teacher is called a "PCA" (pastoral care advisor). As in Romania, a 'PCA' also performs the role of a counsellor.

=== Austria ===
In Austria, from lower secondary schools on, each class mostly stays in the same classroom and teachers move between the classes. Each class has a homeroom teacher (named "Klassenvorstand" in Austrian German, "form teacher" in British English). There may be special hours reserved for announcements etc., but homeroom teachers perform such activities either during regular lesson periods, or a so-called "Klassenvorstandsstunde", which could roughly be translated as "form teacher period", which are mandatory for the students. Additionally, the attendance is usually checked at the beginning of every period.

=== Bangladesh ===
In Bangladesh a homeroom teacher, also referred to as "class teacher", has the duty of taking attendance records of students in a class and making any minor announcements not covered during assembly.

=== Canada ===
Homeroom in Canadian schools follows the US model as well, but the timing of it differs depending on the school district (and, in many cases, varies by the individual school). Some schools do not have homerooms but the day is broken into 5 periods.

=== China ===
In China, students often do not move between classes for different lessons and have a 10-minute period in which additional homeroom tasks can be done. Often these tasks include the collection or distribution of homework or the cleaning of the classroom. In competitive schools, the composition of homeroom classes is sometimes based on ability in one or more core subjects. For example, students with a talent for science and math might be grouped together in one homeroom, while students with more practical or artistic skills are put together in another. In such cases, the class' homeroom teacher often specializes in one of the core areas used to select his or her class, in addition to provide both academic and life advice to students. There will usually also be a student elected by the others as a class monitor to assist their teachers with homeroom tasks and act as intermediary between the teachers and students.

=== France ===
The equivalent in France is the professeur(e) principal(e), who teaches the class in a specific subject (as do other teachers) but accepts additional duties such as distributing administrative documents, giving advice on courses to follow, acting as intermediary in cases of conflict, collating other teachers' impressions of the class and of individual students in preparation for the quarterly report, and various other tasks. For this they receive a small salary bonus.

=== Germany ===
For Germany, basically the same is true as for Austria (the teacher is called "Klassenlehrer"). Teachers normally do not receive a salary bonus but are expected to take classes in turn.

=== India and Pakistan ===
In both India and Pakistan, a homeroom teacher is referred to as a class teacher. In nursury and primary settings, the person may also be referred to as mother teacher. A class teacher teaches his or her subject in the homeroom and takes the attendance records of students in a class and distributes administrative documents, gives advice on courses to follow, acts as intermediary in cases of conflict, collates other teachers' impressions of the class and of individual students in preparation for the quarterly report, and does various other tasks such as making small announcements regarding trips, etc.

=== Japan ===
Homeroom in Japanese schools forms a greater part of students' lives, with homeroom teachers acting as a substitute parent in many ways. Students usually have the same homeroom teacher and fellow students during their entire life at a given school. Students are expected to take on tasks for their homeroom, including cleaning, day duty (note-taking and classroom organization), and the organization of competitive events between homeroom classes. Students also often eat lunch in their homeroom. Teachers must usually travel to the students' homeroom, rather than students going to a classroom dedicated to a particular subject. Teachers must carry all materials needed for multiple classes, therefore the lessons usually end up taking on a lecture style with students simply taking notes in preparation for testing.

=== Jordan ===
In Jordan, the homeroom concept (مربي الصف) is widely used in schools. The homeroom teacher is responsible for almost everything concerning their class. At the start of the school year, it's the homeroom teacher's responsibility to make sure that everyone gets their textbooks and materials, which are supplied by the government.

=== Malaysia ===
In Malaysia, most government national schools use a homeroom system similar to the Japanese as schools and the school life of students in Malaysia have retained some form of influence from them during the Japanese Occupation.

Students in primary school often stay in the same homeroom from Standard 1 to Standard 6. In secondary school, students also stay in the same homeroom from Form 1 to 3. In Form 4–5, the students will be separated based on the streams (Science or Arts) they chose, however this may change in 2020 as the government is currently changing its education policy. However, some schools have a segregation system where better performing students get shifted to a different class (usually with better teachers) while those who perform poorly or have disciplinary issues get shifted to the more under-performing classes (naughty classes or behind classes), these classes usually have newer teachers. The performances of the students are taken from their annual examination average or overall position in the school near the end of the school year to determine their classes in the following school year. This encourages competition among the students and acts as an incentive to do well in exams while discouraging complacency among the smarter students. However, there has been plans since 2018 to abolish such system, allowing equal treatment and opportunities among all the students while allowing the better performing students to help the under-performing ones. This also prevents segregation among the students and bias from the teachers.

Since the students stay in the same classroom for all subjects, the teachers are the ones that have to travel to the classes, except for subjects that require the use of lab equipment, art equipment or other specialised tools. Students are also given tasks and a duty roster to clean their classroom, decorate their classrooms for events and celebrations, plan and organise events for carnival day or sports day. Most meetings are held before classes start, during the short break times between subjects or during recess. These meetings are often managed by the class monitor, assistant monitor, secretary, treasurer and other members of the class committee. Sometimes, these meetings are held with the school prefects or teachers. The schools will also have assemblies before the students go their class.

A 'big assembly' is held every Monday to raise the national flag, sing the anthems and is often when the principal gives important speeches or announcements, along with other teachers. This assembly is longer than the usual ones held on other days of the week, where students just gather for a short while before entering their classes. 'Small assemblies' like these are often just announcements without the principal or singing of the anthems. Sometimes prefects are the ones running these small assemblies with or without the supervision of a teacher. It gives them a chance to perform surprise spot-checks or uniform checks.

The term "homeroom" is hardly used, instead students use "form teacher" or "guru tingkatan" or "主任老师" referring to the teacher in charge of the class. Usually, one teacher is assigned to one class who will manage the same class until they graduate. Since these teachers spent years with their students, many of them will return to thank their teachers and keeping in touch after graduation have never been easier since the advent of social media.

=== Netherlands ===
In the Netherlands, the students are put in a group (class) which more or less stays the same during their high school career. Those groups are sorted into levels, depending on a test child take at the end of primary school and their teachers' advice. Those levels determine how long you stay in high school and what kind of school you can attend after high school. Usually, the only reason to switch groups is when you go up a level or drop a level at the end of a year, based on your grades and performance. This, students always take all classes with exactly the same group, have lunch breaks at the same time, etcetera.

Each group is assigned a mentor, which is a teacher who teaches a certain subject to multiple groups at every level. In the mean time, these mentors are responsible for their students' well-being, grades and performance, group dynamics and more. They're also there to advise students regarding choices they have to make like, what school to go to next or what career to pick and help them with personal issues, and most of them plan a few fun activities or trips during the school year. All of this has to happen during the mentor's own class, as there is no homeroom. However, some schools schedule a mentor class once a week or once a month, and most mentors make time to talk to each student once or twice in private before or after school.

=== New Zealand ===
Homeroom (or "form-class") in New Zealand is similar to the US concept, however it varies from school to school. It's mostly used in high schools, because classes are taught by different subject teachers. Classmates in the same form class often split up for different subjects. Morning form combine form period and roll call in the morning, and a period called DEAR (Drop Everything and Read) or SSR (silent sustained reading) often occurs after the lunch break. Form classes precede the first period and can take place before or after the school assembly, if the school has daily assemblies.

=== Panama ===
Homeroom in Panamanian schools is similar to the US model. However, it is not an optional period as all students are required to attend homeroom sessions every Monday morning (in rare cases, every day). It is called 'Consejería' (Counseling) and takes place every Monday morning as the first period. The teacher fulfills the role of a counselor (consejero), as s/he is in charge of registering attendance, collecting homework and other assignments, and make announcements. Students are expected to take on tasks for their homeroom including cleaning, leading morning prayer, leading classroom organization, homework and handling homework and assignments. The homeroom period may also be used for reading and writing after main activities have been fulfilled.

=== Romania ===
Homeroom is practiced in all educational institutions in Romania under the name of Dirigenţie, which takes its name from the title of the homeroom teacher, called Diriginte. He or she also fulfills the role of a counselor.

=== Russia ===
Homeroom period in Russian schools is called "klassny chas" (literally, "class hour" as usually it's one academic hour long). Each class is around 20–30 people; each class gets a homeroom teacher ("klassny rukovoditel", literally "class supervisor"), that stays with them from the 1st till 4th grade. Then they move to a 5th grade and get a new homeroom teacher who looks over them until they finish school. This homeroom teacher schedules the homeroom period "klassny chas" approximately once a week and uses it to make announcements and talk about their behaviour and marks.

=== Singapore ===
Homeroom periods vary between schools in Singapore. Usually, homeroom periods are used for class contact time and as an opportunity to discuss what is going on around the school itself. Sometimes students go to the hall for briefing on any important events like a marathon or an exam. Most secondary schools call it Assembly or Form Teacher (FT) period, as the term "homeroom" is rarely used.

=== South Korea ===
Homeroom hour in South Korea takes a significant role in a child's education. Homeroom teachers play many roles; acting as counselors, administrators, and disciplinarians. Homeroom classes in high school are especially important as the students make their transition to college. Homeroom hour starts before first period and also after the last period, lasting between twenty and thirty minutes each time. Teachers use this time to make announcements, discipline students, and take care of other administrative duties. More importantly, teachers take this time to establish order in class. If a teacher is easygoing, the class is more likely to be disruptive. Likewise, if the teacher is strict, the class is more likely to be orderly. School administrators and staff see the homeroom classes as a reflection on the teachers. Moreover, if the class has bad test scores, it is subsequently blamed on the teacher. The homeroom teacher is responsible for pushing the students to do their best. Students often see their homeroom teachers as their role models, and often visit them in the staff room. It is also common for students to stop by to tease the teacher or ask frivolous questions. In the twelfth grade, homeroom teachers especially press the students to do well on their college entrance exams. The twelfth-grade homeroom teacher is considered to be the most important teacher in the student's education. Consequently, twelfth grade teachers have a lot of work and are reluctant to take on teaching this grade. After graduating, students often come back and visit their homeroom teachers. It is customary to come with gifts or food.

=== Spain ===
In Spain, homeroom is basically the same as in France. There is one main teacher called tutor. Some schools do have an hour a week of homeroom, being called tutoría, which is usually placed in high school education.

=== United Kingdom ===
Although the term homeroom is not used in the United Kingdom, students are usually assigned to a tutor group or form, with a daily registration period which generally serves the same purpose as a homeroom. The groupings and activities within a tutor group vary between schools and age groups; generally speaking, primary school students remain in their form groups for the majority of the time and there is no defined 'form time'.

In secondary schools, students are assigned to a form group, led by a form tutor, for registration periods in the morning and during/after lunch, (or extensions thereof, such as weekly tutorials) and are their first point of pastoral contact within a school. Form time is often used for a variety of purposes from administration (taking the register, making announcements, university and career applications - Form tutors tend to write the references for UCAS applications.) to more general studies such as personal, social and health education. They are the first point of contact for parents and are meant to provide mentorship and feedback to students, looking at school reports, attending parent meetings, and helping students to achieve.

Many secondary schools form the students into single year groups of about 30 students (so a large school might have 5-6 forms in year seven), and these groups attend almost all classes together except where subjects have been tiered by ability (such as maths and English). Some secondary schools offer 'vertical' form groups, however, composed of 3-4 students from each year group from years 7, 8, 9, 10, and 11 as a way of peer mentoring and building confidence for the younger students. In many schools, forms take turns offering a presentation to the whole school assembly on a rota, with self-chosen subjects like bullying or subjects determined by the Colleges.

In Scotland, the use of SEEMIS software is commonplace, and is used to monitor attendance with a period-by-period registration of pupils.

=== United States ===
In the United States, homeroom is considered a planning period or registration. It is scheduled often at the first period of the day or it may follow the lunch break. Sometimes it can be at the end of the day after all lessons have finished; some schools have both AM and PM homerooms, in which case the later period is the time to return to the homeroom class and pack up for the day. In schools where the first period of the day is optional, homeroom may be deferred to the second period. During morning homeroom, teachers take attendance registers, may collect lunch orders, and carry out other administrative activities. Announcements may be made, correspondence distributed, and the Pledge of Allegiance recited.

In many high schools in the United States, homeroom occurs only a few times per school year; for example, only twice per year, on the first day of each new semester, to hand out class schedules. For the remainder of the school year, any administrative paperwork handed to students happens during another regularly scheduled class.
