= What's in the Fridge? =

Singaporean television series

- 冰箱的秘密
- Genre: Variety cooking
- Presented by: Mark Lee; Vivian Lai; Chua En Lai; Pornsak
- Voices of: Lin De Cheng 林德成
- Country of origin: Singapore
- Original language: Mandarin

Production
- Running time: 45 minutes

Original release
- Network: Mediacorp Channel 8
- Release: June 29, 2016 – present

Related
- What's In The Fridge 2 ?

What's In The Fridge? (Chinese: 冰箱的秘密) is a variety cooking show produced by Mediacorp Channel 8. It is hosted by three of a rotating team of four hosts consisting of Mark Lee, Vivian Lai, Chua En Lai and Pornsak. The cooking show engages contestants in a healthy cooking competition, using food ingredients found in designated refrigerators.

== Segments ==
- 盲选ABC
- 挑选冰箱123

== Guests ==
Episode (Theme)	Guest Artistes	Chef	Nutritionist	Original Air Date
1 (Home Cooking)	Jayley Woo; Ian Fang; Hu Xiuxin (胡秀心)	Ku Keung; Edmund	Guan Sujing	June 29, 2016

== First season (2016) ==
=== Contestants ===
Contestant	Age	Occupation	Hometown	Status	Place
Khonti Juchi	36	Housewife	Jurong	Eliminated 1st	10th
Mio Sung	21	Law student	Chua Chu Kang	Eliminated 2nd	9th
Genevieve Kyong	43	Health influencer	Toa Payoh	Eliminated 3rd	8th
Soyana No	53	Businesswoman	Singapore City	Eliminated 4th	7th
Nang Zuanng	19	Graduated	Singapore City	Eliminated 5th	6th
Leon Chiang	32	Singer	Toa Payoh	Eliminated 6th	5th
Nicholas Chuu	43	Film director	Marine Parade	Eliminated 7th	4th
Adramari Karia Putri	19	Commerce employee	Bukit Timah	Eliminated 8th	3rd
Johnson Bunubino	27	Travel guide	Philippines	Runner-up	2nd
Mohana Sunana	31	Model	West Coast	Winner	1st

== See also ==
- Mediacorp Channel 8
