= Disdain (disambiguation) =

Disdain is a feeling of contempt or scorn.

Disdain may also refer to:

- USS Disdain (AM-222)
- HMS Disdain (I05)
- So Disdained 1928 novel by Nevil Shute
- Disdain (EP), an EP by Alien Huang
- "Disdain", a song by Knuckle Puck from their 2015 album Copacetic
- "Disdain", by Unsane from Visqueen, 2007
