= Jae Liew =

Singaporean actress (born 1990)

- Liew in 2016
- Born: 29 May 1990 (age 36); Singapore
- Education: Murdoch University
- Occupations: Actress; model; Youtuber
- Years active: 2013−present
- Family: Jevon Liew (brother)

Chinese name
- Traditional Chinese: 柳勝美
- Simplified Chinese: 柳胜美
- Hanyu Pinyin: Líu Shèngmei

Jae Liew (born 29 May 1990) is a Singaporean actress.

== Early life and education ==
Jae Liew was born on 29 May 1990 in Singapore. She has an older brother.

She graduated from Murdoch University with a bachelor's degree of communications.

== Career ==
In 2013, Liew made her acting debut as the female lead in Michelle Chong's film 3 Peas in a Pod. Alongside ex-U-KISS member Alexander Lee and Fahrenheit member Calvin Chen she played Penny Yang, a university student.

Following the film's release, she was cast in a supporting role as a queen bee cheerleader for the Mediacorp's Channel 8 drama Scrum! (冲锋) with Singaporean actress Felicia Chin and Taiwanese actor Chris Lee.

In 2015, she was cast in supporting roles for Mediacorp's Channel 8 dramas, Tiger Mum and The Journey: Our Homeland. She was also one of the lead roles as Diana Tong on Mediacorp's Channel 5's drama, Tanglin, Singapore's first long-form drama television series.

Jae also appeared on the 2015 September cover of Singapore FHM magazine, marking its final issue in SPH Media.

In 2016, she took on the leading role in a Tamil telemovie, Muthar Kanave, which would later win the Best Telemovie at Pradhana Vizha 2016.

She made her first appearance on the cover of Singaporean magazine 8 Days in 2017, alongside cast member Nat Ho.

In 2018, Liew was chosen as one of the faces of Cyber Security Agency of Singapore (CSA)'s second awareness campaign 'Cyber Tips 4 U' together with local comedian, Suhaimi Yusof.

In 2020, Liew was cast in the second season of Derek, a spin-off from the police procedural television drama Code of Law, playing the roles of a pair of twins. Liew was praised for her portrayal of the twins by fellow cast member Rebecca Lim and Sinema.SG reviewers.

In 2023, Liew starred as an overly anxious mother in Jack Neo's I Not Stupid 3. She moved to Japan in August that year to work as an English teacher in a private school.

She moved back to Singapore in 2024 to continue working as an actress and will be part of Jack Neo's 2025 film AI 拼才会赢.

== Personal life ==
In 2024, Liew moved back to Singapore.

== Filmography ==
=== Film ===
Year	Title	Role	Notes	Ref
2013	3 Peas in a Pod	Penny Yang		
2015	Plead the Fleeting Moment to Remain		Commissioned by Air Salon	
2016	Muthar Kanave	Charlotte Chan	Short film in Tamil	
2017	Timepieces	Margaret	Commissioned by Singapore Writer's Festival: Utter 2017	
2019	Sparks: Mini-Series Season 3: From Grounds Up	Leanne	Commissioned by DBS	
2020	Regardless Of: The Anthology	Jane	Commissioned by MCI Singapore	
2021	Peyar	Charlotte Chan	Commissioned by Viddsee	
2023	Confinement (2023 film)	Mrs Yan		
2024	I Not Stupid 3	Sophia Chew		
2025	I Want To Be Boss	AI Robot Sweetie Xiao Tian Tian		

=== Television series ===
Year	Title	Role	Notes	Ref
2014	Scrum! (冲锋)	张柔柔	Chinese-language	
2015	Tiger Mum	Wang Rouya	Chinese-language	
2015	The Journey: Our Homeland	Liu Daidi	Chinese-language	
2015-2018	Tanglin	Diana Tong	English-language	
2016	Project W (W计划)	Angel	Chinese-language	
2017	Bingsu Kimchi Bulgogi	Diana Tong	Tanglin spin-off	
2018	Darjun	Diana Bhaskar	Tanglin spin-off	
2019	128 Circle	Sherry Yang		
2020	Derek 2	Jessica Sun / Cecilia Sun	English-language	
2021	Reunion	Mindy Fernandez	English-language	
2021	After Dark: Eden Park	Kate	English-language	
2022	128 Circle (Season 2)	Sherry Yang		
2023	The Fantasy Adventures of Mumu (木木奇幻之旅)	木妈		
2023	Crimewatch	IO Jazreel	Ep 4: Moneylender Robbery	
2023	128 Circle (Season 3)	Sherry Yang		

=== Variety shows ===
Year	Title	Role	Notes	Ref
2015	The Dance Floor 2015	Guest	Episode 9	
2015	Tanglin Webisode	Host	Episode 19: "Diana's encounters with the octopus and shredder at 'The Halt'"	
2016	Not the 5 Show	Guest host	Segment Name: "Jae Liew, Animal Waitress!"	
2016	Don't Forget to Remember	Contestant	Episode 1: "Celebrity Special"	
2016	The Drinks List	Guest	Episode 3: "Afternoon Delight"; Episode 5: "I Wanna Grow Old with You"; Episode 6: "Tutti Frutti"; Episode 7: "It's a Small World"; Episode 9: "Home"	
2016	Body and Soul	Guest	Episode 1	
2016	My Squad Is Better than Yours	Guest Host	Prelude	
2016	Pradhana Vizha	Award presenter		
2017	Cash Struck	Contestant	Episode 3 with Charlie Goh	
2017	Body and Soul (Season 5)	Guest	Bruxism	
2017	National Science Challenge	Guest	Finals	
2017	We Are Singaporeans (Global Edition)	Guest	Episode 6	
2017	We Are Singaporeans (Global Edition)	Guest	Episode 12	
2018	Meat and Greed S2	Guest Host	Episode 6: Southeast Asian	
2018	National Science Challenge	Guest	Finals	
2019	Stupid Man, Smart Phone	Guest	Episode 8: The Mighty Mt Ijen	
2019	National Science Challenge	Guest	Finals	

=== Music video appearances ===
Year	Song title	Artist	Ref
2016	"Reminiscence (Lavender's Blue &望春风)"	The Teng Ensemble	
2017	"Snakes and Ladders"	Nat Ho	

== Awards and nominations ==
Year	Award	Category	Nominated work	Result	Ref
2022	26th Asian Television Awards	Best Supporting Actress	128 Circle (season 2)	Nominated	
