= Point of Entry (TV series) =

- Genre: Police procedural Action/Thriller
- Directed by: Chan Bang Yuan; Dennis Chong; Ian Seymour; Joey Cheung; S Deakarajen; S.S. Vikneshwaran
- Starring: Devarajan Varadarajan; Jourdan Lee Khoo (Season 1, 2, 3); Fadhilah Samsudin; Bernard Tan; Jaymee Ong (Season 2–4); Darryl Yong (Season 2–4); Liv Lo (Season 4); Jack Yang (Season 4); Carl Ng (Season 1–3); Pamelyn Chee (Season 1, 2); Jade Seah (Season 2); Ya Hui (Season 3)
- Country of origin: Singapore
- Original language: English
- No. of episodes: 69 (list of episodes)

Production
- Production locations: Singapore; Thailand; Philippines
- Running time: 45–60 minutes (approx.)

Original release
- Network: MediaCorp Channel 5
- Release: 2 December 2010 – 27 March 2014

Related
- C.L.I.F. Crimewatch

Point of Entry (also known as 入境点 in Chinese) is a Singaporean English language action drama produced by MediaCorp Channel 5 in partnership with the ICA, dramatizing the exploits of an elite team of ICA agents who regularly deal with illegal immigrants and cross-jurisdiction crimes. It airs on Thursdays in the 8 pm time slot. The first season premiered on 2 December 2010. Season 4 premiered on 26 December 2013.

Episodes are available to watch on xinmsn's and Toggle's Catch-up TV portal. A special webisode version has been made for online viewing.

The first season was nominated for the Best Action Drama category at the 2011 Asia Rainbow TV Awards.

== Synopsis ==
Point of Entry is a 1-hour action drama about an elite team of ICA special agents, and their fight to keep Singapore's borders safe from smuggling and illegal immigration by land, sea and air.

Team Epsilon is the ICA's special operations team, consisting of officer-scholar Glenn (Carl Ng), military sharpshooter Vivian (Pamelyn Chee), parkour specialist Dynesh (Devarajan), computer genius Norah (Fadhilah), and veteran operative Cheong (Bernard Tan).

=== Season 1 ===
The series starts off with the head of Team Epsilon assassinated during a police operation. DSP Glenn Chua is then brought in to be the new head of Epsilon. The first season is about the problems and challenges Team Epsilon faces as they try to bring down an illegal syndicate called "Angel", which is based in Thailand. Near the end of the season, it was revealed that Glenn's best friend, Jackson (Jourdan Lee) is actually the son of the head of "Angel" and he is then shot by Vivian (Pamelyn Chee) in the season finale, after threatening to kill Glenn.

=== Season 2 ===
Season 2 focuses more on the problems faced by the Singapore immigration and checkpoints and also on Glenn's dilemma after losing his best friend, Jackson. It also reveals that Vivian and Jackson had a son named Jonah. As the season is more about problems in Singapore, it features less of the "Angel" syndicate in Thailand. Noi, Jackson's sister got married but soon finds out that her husband murdered her father in an attempt to take over "Angel" syndicate. Her father's death caused her to lose sanity and she killed her husband. Nearing the end of the season, Vivian is killed by Noi, after being locked up in a burning abandoned warehouse. It was to gain possession of Jonah who is her nephew and also to avenge Jackson whom Vivian killed. But Glenn would not let Noi take Jonah away and he becomes Jonah's guardian. In the season finale, it was revealed that Jackson is still alive and the season ends with a cliffhanger of Glenn assassinated by Jackson.

=== Season 3 ===
Glenn Chua survived the attempted assassination by Jackson and took a long leave from Team Epsilon to take care of Jonah. Jackson disguises himself as Virote Boonprasong and continue his illegal dealings in Singapore. He had become the new head of "Angel" syndicate and strives to bring the syndicate back to its former glory. He frequently visited his sister, Noi, in prison to make plan for her escape. Glenn managed to see through Jackson's disguise and begin work his way to find proof. Jackson wanted his son, Jonah, back and began to make plans. In the end, Jonah was kidnapped by one of Jackson's associates in the Philippines, Miguel. The season ends with Jonah saved and brought back to Singapore by Cheong, while Glenn and Jackson faced off in a final fight which resulted in Jackson being killed by Glenn and ending off with a cliffhanger of Miguel aiming his gun at Glenn.

=== Season 4 ===
Glenn Chua is on the run. Glenn is a wanted man in Philippines for killing Jackson and framed for killing Miguel. He joins an illegal Filipino syndicate, "Multo", in order to survive being hunted by the police. "Multo" specializes in making a new set of dangerous drugs, named "Helo Yelo". Later in the series, Glenn returns to Team Epsilon.

New threats and villains appear in this season, as Team Epsilon takes on a new international syndicate based in the Philippines that will not stop at any means to perpetuate their heinous activities: human trafficking and drug smuggling.

Leader Glenn Chua (Jack Yang) goes deep undercover to sift out the complex web of players in this organisation and bring down its hidden mastermind, while veteran Cheong Guan Meng takes over the reins during Glenn's absence to lead the members: Tech expert Norah Rahmat, parkour expert Dynesh Krishnan, gung ho valiant Matthew Yong, with the support of their boss Calvin Wong and Home Team liaison Kara Yeo. New member, ASP Sophie Thomas (Liv Lo), from the CID Anti-Vice department joins the team, and CID Intel Officer Victor de Cruz takes over guardianship of his nephew, Jonah. Multo's new head, Analyn Ocampo (Padilla Bela) gets close to Glenn Chua, to the extent of marriage, but for an ulterior motive, as to move "Multo" into Singapore's line of underhand illegal activities.

Near the end of the series, Analyn gets unmasked as the head of "Multo". She would be eventually arrested in Philippines, halfway through her wedding, and unexpectedly by her husband-to-be, Glenn Chua and Kara Yeo. Sophie and Dynesh would get together, along with Glenn and Kara (Presumably).

== Cast ==
=== Team Epsilon ===
Castt	Character	Position	Season
Carl Ng (Season 1-3); Jack J. Yang (Season 4)	DSP Glenn Chua	Head of Team Epsilon and Kara Yeo's lover.	1,2,3,4
Jaymee Ong	DSP Kara Yeo	Former CID officer and Glenn Chua's Lover	2,3,4
Bernard Tan	ASP Cheong Guan Meng "Uncle Cheong"	Deputy Head of Team Epsilon (Season 1 - 3)	1,2,3,4
Devarajan Varadarajan	SGT Dynesh Krishnan	Special in undercover and in crush with Sophie Thomas .	1,2,3,4
Darryl Yong	SGT Matthew Yong .	Rookie officer and ex-boyfriend to Uncle Cheong's Daughter, Jia Hui	2,3,4
Fadhilah Samsudin	SSGT Norah Rahmat	IT/intelligence analyst and Yasmine's mother	1,2,3,4
Liv Lo	ASP Sophie Thomas	Former member of CID Anti-Vice Department and Dynesh's crush	4
Constance Song	SUPT Esther Ong	Deputy Director for Intelligence; Team Epsilon's superior	1,4

=== Other cast ===
Cast	Character	Description	Season
Desmond Tan	DSP Victor de Cruz	CID Intel Officer	3,4
Bela Padilla	Analyn Ocampo	Main Villain; Glenn Chua's Saviour and Leader of Multo Syndicate	4
RK Bagatsing	Anton Redondo	Efren's associate	4
Alex Cortez	Tito Efren	Right hand Man for Head Of "Multo" Syndicate	4
JB Alegre	Dr. Eddie Zamora	Main Chemist Of "Multo" Syndicate working for Analyn Ocampo	4
Jourdan Lee	Jackson Goh/ Virote Boonprasong	Main Villain "Frenemy" of Glenn Chua and Former Head Of "Angel" syndicate	1,2,3
Dusita Anuchitchanchai	Noi Limthongkul	Main Villain; Jackson's sister	1,2,3
Artikant Noonpukdee	Ricky Limthongkul	Jackson's half brother	1
Suchao Pongwilai	Marcus Limthongkul	Head of "Angel" syndicate	1,2
Andre Nilsen	Samak	Marcus' successor	2
Simon Ibarra	Miguel Rodriguez	Jackson's business associate in the Philippines	3
Karylle	Tala Sison	Miguel's Fiancée	3
Micah Muñoz	Aron Ravelo	Miguel's associate	1,2,3
Melody Chen	DSP Marianne Chong	Glenn's ex-wife	1
Pamelyn Chee	ASP Vivian De Cruz	Former member of the Team Epsilon, and at Jackson's Goh Lover. Deceased.	1,2
Jade Seah	SGT Liu Ai Ling	Former member of the Team Epsilon	2
Ya Hui	Mellissa Chew	Former member of the Team Epsilon	3,4
Marcus Mok	SUPT Calvin Wong	In-Charge of Team Epsilon	2,3,4

== Reception ==
The first season was well received by the public and the ICA itself. It was renewed for a second season, once again in collaboration with the ICA. After a boost in ratings for Season 3, it was again renewed for a fourth season.

== Notes ==
Although the drama series may be categorised as a "police procedural", in reality, the ICA is technically separate from the Singapore Police Force although they may collaborate under certain circumstances (e.g. Interpol cases, cross-border trafficking) and both are under the jurisdiction of the Ministry of Home Affairs.

== See also ==
- ICA's Official Website
