= Tourist Trap =

A tourist trap is an establishment made for attracting tourists.

Tourist trap may also refer to:

== Film ==
- Tourist Trap (1979 film), a horror film directed by David Schmoeller
- Tourist Trap (1998 film), a comedy film directed by Richard Benjamin

== Literature ==
- Tourist Trap, a 1986 novel by Julie Smith

== Television ==
=== Episodes ===
- "Tourist Trap", Ben 10 season 1, episode 6 (2006)
- "Tourist Trap", Crocadoo series 1, episode 12 (1996)
- "Tourist Trap", Forensic Files season 8, episode 6 (2003)
- "Tourist Trap", Godzilla: The Series season 2, episode 19 (2001)
- "Tourist Trap", Major Crimes season 5, episode 6 (2016)
- "Tourist Trap", Point of Entry season 3, episode 7 (2013)
- "Tourist Trap", Sheena season 1, episode 5 (2000)
- "Tourist Trap", The Hitchhiker season 6, episode 13 (1990)
- "Tourist Trap", T.U.F.F. Puppy season 3, episode 3b(2015)
- "The Tourist Trap", The Bill series 5, episode 82 (1989)

=== Shows ===
- Tourist Trap (TV series), a 2018-19 comedy series broadcast on BBC One Wales
