= Darryl Yong =

Singaporean actor

- Born: Darryl Yong Tze Wen; 26 April 1985 (age 40); Singapore
- Occupation: Actor
- Awards: Star Search 2010 : Grand Finalist

Chinese name
- Simplified Chinese: 杨子文
Transcriptions
Standard Mandarin
- Hanyu Pinyin: Yáng Zǐwén

Darryl Yong Tze Wen (Chinese: 杨子文; pinyin: Yáng Zǐwén; born 26 April 1985) is a Singaporean actor.

== Career ==
Yong was a contestant on Project SuperStar 2005 and Star Search 2010. Although he was eliminated in the Star Search Grand Finals he was one of seven of the top 10 finalists offered a contract by MediaCorp. He has since acted in both English and Chinese language productions by MediaCorp.

Yong graduated from Temasek Polytechnic with a diploma in law and management. He was a flight attendant with Singapore Airlines prior to entering the entertainment industry.

== Filmography ==
Year	Work	Role	Note	Ref
2021	Mind Jumper 触心罪探	Radium Lo / Liu Liangjie 罗崇德 / 刘亮杰		
2020	Mind's Eye 心眼	Liu Anlun		
2019	KIN	Benny Pang		
2018	Till We Meet Again 千年来说对不起	Rich Kid 富二代		
2018	You Can Be An Angel 3 你也可以是天使3	Brandon		
2017	When Duty Calls 卫国先锋	Li Hongxun 李宏讯		
2017	118 II	Ben Tong		
2015–2018	Tanglin	Ben Tong		
2015	The Journey: Our Homeland 信约: 我们的家园	Peishuang 培双		
2014	Against The Tide 逆潮	Xie Honglie 谢鸿烈		
2014	Mata Mata: A New Era	Johnny		
2013'	I'm in Charge 小子当家	Albert Chang		
'2012	Point of Entry 3	Matthew Yong		
'2012	Abang Ah Beng			
2011	Devotion 阿娣	Chen Shanhe 陈山河		
2011	Point of Entry 2	Matthew Yong		
2010	Unriddle 最火搭档			
2010	No Limits 泳闯琴关			
2010	New Beginnings 红白囍事			
2009	Daddy at Home 企鹅爸爸			
