= Tanglin (TV series) =

- Genre: Socio-drama; Dramedy; Family; Coffeshop
- Written by: Tan Wei Lyn; Prasad; Joanne Teo; Lynette Chiu; Sam Lee; Timothy Teoh
- Directed by: Ong Kuo Sin; S. Deakarajen; Alex Tan; J Cheung Pui Chung; Don Aravind; Christopher Lim
- Starring: Wee Soon Hui; Darryl Yong; Jae Liew; James Seah; Laurence Pang; Charlie Goh; Mathialagan M Eswari Gunasagar; James Kumar; Yuvina Malathi Ram; Richard Low; Margaret Lim; Constance Song; Nat Ho; Eden Ang; Valere Ng; Rahman Rahim; Masura Ahmed; Syirah Jusni; Fauzie Laily
- Opening theme: Season 1 : Shine A Light by Jack & Rai; Season 2 & 3 : Opening Title by Lydia Lee & Ray Ong
- Country of origin: Singapore
- Original language: English
- No. of seasons: 3
- No. of episodes: 823

Production
- Production locations: Infinite Studios; Mediacorp Studios
- Running time: approx. 20-22 minutes per episode

Original release
- Network: Mediacorp Channel 5
- Release: 30 June 2015 – 28 September 2018

Related
- KIN; 118 II (2016 - 2017)

Tanglin is a Singaporean drama produced by Mediacorp. Tanglin premiered on 30 June 2015 and was broadcast on Mediacorp Channel 5 at 8:30pm every weekday with a repeat at 12am and 1.30pm the next day. The series finale aired on 28 September 2018. The repeat telecast was aired every weekday at 2pm from 8 Feb 2021 and now airs at 4pm starting 23 May 2022.

The series have started special guest appearances have been made by local celebrities like Kimberly Chia, Taufik Batisah, and second generation radio disc jockey Mike Kasem.

== Plot ==
Tanglin is a daily drama that centres on the lives of multiracial and multigenerational families – mainly the Tongs, Bhaskars, Rahmans, and Lims – residents of a middle-income neighbourhood in the Holland Village, Tanglin, and Commonwealth areas; their lives reflect the joys, trials and tribulations of everyday Singaporeans. In 2016, the families are entering a new chapter of their lives – from the teens moving on to National Service and University, the arrival of Norleena and Vanessa's babies, to Kwong San's life post-retirement from KS Foods. New romances blossom, while old relationships are put to the test as various fresh faces enter the lives of the Tanglin community.

== Cast ==
=== The Lims ===
Actor	Role
Richard Low	Kwong San, a traditional businessman, is the head of the Lim family, though some might argue it is actually his wife Bee Li. He always wanted his son Jun Kai to succeed him despite protests from his daughter Xue Ling.
Margaret Lim	Toh Bee Li, Wife of successful businessman Kwong San, Bee Li plays the role of the supportive spouse and devoted mother to Jun Kai and Xue Ling. A loose cannon, her words are often deemed as harsh and uncaring.
Constance Song	Lim Xue Ling, Despite her aptitude for business, Xue Ling is overlooked as the successor of the family business because she is a woman. She is strict with Michael and Melissa as opposed to Adam's ‘nice-guy' approach. (EP 1 - 500, 630-)
Nat Ho	Lim Jun Kai (Jay Lim), Reluctant successor to the KS Foods legacy, Jun Kai is the son of Kwong San. He returns from overseas after many years, and through a run-in with Diana, ends up being an integral part of the Tongs.
Amirah Yahya	Wati, maid of the Lims' family. She has a good heart but often bungles up simple instructions much to Bee Li's annoyance.

=== The Tongs ===
Actor	Role
Laurence Pang	Tong Ah Biao, Ordinary senior citizen Ah Biao adores his daughter-in-law Li Yan and the grandchildren. He is fiercely independent, because he doesn't want to be seen as a burden to the family. He stays active by working as a taxi driver.
Wee Soon Hui	Tong Li Yan nee Au-Yeong, Li Yan, the matriarch of the Tongs, took over the care of Robert's four children and his father Ah Biao when Robert died. Despite this, she remains resilient and optimistic. She runs the popular Tanglin Coffee House.
Adam Chen	Adam Tong, Husband to Xue Ling and eldest son of the Tong household, Adam chose to be a househusband to focus on his children, but earned the ire of his in-laws. He has a temper and uses MMA as an outlet to de-stress.
Darryl Yong	Ben Tong, Ben is a good-humoured, sensitive new age guy who avoids confrontations and hurting people's feelings. He gave up his studies to help Li Yan run the coffee house. A lifetime Liverpool F.C. supporter, he enjoys playing football during his free time.
James Seah	Chris Tong, Older twin to Diana, Chris is a bright but unrealistic chancer with a strong sense of entitlement. He is always looking for ways to make a quick buck. He was in a long term relationship with girlfriend Suzanne, whom he eventually marries.
Jae Liew	Diana Tong, Younger twin to Chris, Diana is a kick-ass tomboy with a down-to-earth personality. She went full-time into business to help with the family's financial load. She is caring and selfless, and cares deeply for Li Yan.
Charlie Goh	Eddie Tong, Li Yan's only biological child. Eddie is the youngest in the Tong household. He is spoiled by grandfather Ah Biao, who tries to make up for his lack of father figure. (EP 1 - 557, 635-)
Eden Ang/Royston Ong Jun Xiong	Michael Tong, Calm headed and mature. Michael is the son of Xue Ling and Adam, and the only grandson of the Lim family. (EP 1 - 430)
Valere Ng	Melissa Tong, Melissa is the daughter of Xue Ling and Adam. Intelligent and bubbly, she likes to annoy her brother Michael by telling on him. She feels pressured to perform well in school like Michael did.

=== The Bhaskars ===
Actor	Role
Mathialagan M	Bhaskar Ram, A caring, dedicated doctor and a dutiful responsible father, Bhaskar is a good son who married the woman of his parents' choice. He lives life according to the rules.
Yuvina Malathi Ram	Meera Bhaskar nee Prakash, The perfect doctor's wife and sophisticated hostess, her ambition is deftly hidden beneath the veneer of gentility and grace. She lives vicariously through her children and goes to great lengths to ensure their well-being and success.
Eswari Gunasagar	Shruti Bhaskar, Pretty and popular, Shruti is a celebrity blogger. Her experience with online bullies made her realise who her real friends are – nerdy Michael and oddball Eddie – who have stuck with her through thick and thin. Former mean girl Pam has also proven to be a good friend.
James Kumar	Arjun Bhaskar, Accomplished, cocky and confident bordering on arrogant, Arjun has led a very charmed life. Training to be a paediatrician, his world is turned upside down when he develops feelings for Diana.
Grace Kalaiselvi	Lathika, The Bhaskars' family maid. Coming from a small village in India, she was married off at the age of eighteen and kicked out of the family when her husband died in a road accident. She moved to Singapore to work as a maid to support her siblings and ageing parents.

=== The Rahmans ===
Actor	Role
Mastura Ahmad	Salmah Samsudin, Happy-go-lucky Salmah has suffered personal tragedy, having lost both her husband and son. She still counts her blessings every day as she settles into a new role as grandmother to Rayyan, and a potential new career in nursing.
Syirah Jusni	Norleena Abdul Rahman, The younger daughter of Salmah. Married to Sulaiman, she has always hoped to fulfil her ambition to be a full-time housewife. She constantly feels outshone by her academically brilliant sister Nadiah.
Fauzie Laily	Sulaiman Hassan, Sulaiman is a duty-bound man who works as a Fire and Rescue Special with the Singapore Civil Defence Force (SCDF). He is easy-going and patient with Norleena's constant demands while managing Salmah's expectations.
Muhamad Zayyan Iffat	Rayyan, Norleena and Sulaiman's son. The bundle of joy in the Rahmans household.
Elfaeza Ul Haq	Nadiah Abdul Rahman, The elder daughter of Salmah. Being career focused, she puts her job first and does not want to get married until she has properly settled down with enough earnings. (EP 1 - 200)

=== Additional cast ===
Actor	Role
Mainly associated with Lim family
Tay Ping Hui	Peter Tay
Kimberly Chia / Kimberly Wang	Lauren Chong
Kayly Loh	Felicia Ng
Gordon Choy	Han Xiong
Mainly associated with Tong family
Rahman Rahim	Zulkifli "Abang Zul" Salim
Bridget Fernandez	Mrs Pereira
Rosalind Pho	Vanessa Kwok
Shwen Lee	Grace Kwok
Silver Ang	Gina Lee
Eleanor Tan	Vivian Lee
Gayle Nerva	Suzanne Monteiro
Mainly associated with Rahman family
Hatta Said	Wafiq Fayad
Mujahid Mahamood	Amir Johan
Siti Nur A’isha Binte Mahmood	Arianna Johan
Aleeyah Nabilah / Hannah Alya Tan	Kalila Wafiq
Jasmani Basri	Hassan Jamal
Aishah Ahmad	Atiqah Azman
Muhammad Danial	Faisal Hassan
Sarah Aulia	Fatimah Hassan
Mainly associated with Bhaskar family
Krissy Jesudason	Tanya Clarke
Christina Kydoniefs	Joy Clarke
Mike Kasem	Jamie Clarke
Sherly Devonne Ng	Pamela Poh
Paul Nagaoka	Jared Toh
Alan M Wong	Shawn Chee
Fadhli Abdullah	Firdaus
Other friends and antagonists
Teddy Tang	Alex
Suhaimi Yusof	Chef Adnan Salim
Lydia Asyiqin	Izzy Rasdin
Taufik Batisah	Khairul Anuar
Louis C Hillyard	Mark De Cruz
Wallace Ang	Wayne Teo
Jade Rasif	Sheila Oh

== Accolades ==
=== Asian Television Award ===
Asian Television Awards – Acting Awards
Year	Category	Nominated work / Nominees	Result
Asian Television Awards 2017	Best Drama Serial	—N/a	Nominated
Asian Television Awards 2017	Best Actress In Supporting Role	Krissy Jesudason	Nominated
