= The Maid (2005 film) =

2005 Singaporean film

- Official film poster
- Chinese: 女佣
- Literal meaning: "Domestic helper"
- Hanyu Pinyin: Nǚyōng
- Hokkien POJ: Lú-iong
- Directed by: Kelvin Tong
- Written by: Kelvin Tong
- Produced by: Chan Pui Yin; Seah Saw Yam; Titus Ho
- Starring: Alessandra De Rossi; Chen Shu Cheng; Hong Hui Fang; Benny Soh
- Cinematography: Lucas Jodogne
- Edited by: Lawrence Ang; Low Hwee Ling
- Music by: Alex Oh; Joe Ng
- Production companies: Mediacorp Raintree Pictures; Boku Films
- Release date: 18 August 2005 (Singapore)
- Running time: 93 minutes
- Country: Singapore
- Languages: Mandarin; English; Teochew; Tagalog

The Maid (Chinese: 女佣) is a 2005 Singaporean horror film directed by Kelvin Tong, revolving around a maid who recently arrived in Singapore from the Philippines. She has to acclimate herself to the customs of the Singapore Seventh Month, during which she struggles with supernatural forces. The maid is employed by a Teochew opera family with many secrets, who give her a place to stay in their dilapidated shophouse.

The film broke the box office record in Singapore for the horror genre, making S$700,000 on its opening weekend.

It won the European Fantastic Film Festival Federation (EFFFF) Asian Film Award at the 10th Puchon International Fantastic Film Festival (PiFan). The EFFFF Asian Film Award is a prize awarded to the best Asian film of the year by the federation, of which PiFan is a supporting member.

It starred Alessandra de Rossi, Hong Huifang, Benny Soh, Guan Zhenwei and Chen Shucheng.

== Plot ==
The Chinese believe that during the Seventh Month, the gates of hell are open and the spirits of the dead are allowed to roam the world freely for a month. Hailing from a small village in the Philippines, 18-year-old Rosa arrives in Singapore on the first day of the Seventh Month to work as a domestic maid. She urgently needs money to save her younger brother who is ill back home. Her employers, the elderly Mr and Mrs Teo, appear kindhearted and sympathetic. Their intellectually disabled son, Ah Soon, also takes to Rosa immediately.

Between cleaning house and helping the Teos out at their Teochew opera workplace, things start going seriously amiss. Rosa glimpses strange apparitions at night and also has vivid nightmares. A boy is killed in an unsafe traffic crossing in front of their house and haunts her during that night's opera. She finds out about Esther, a Filipina maid who worked for the Teos two years before she came. Esther apparently had the same good relationship with Ah Soon as she does now. Rosa begins to suspect that something is fishy.

While Rosa is exploring some of the shady areas of the house, she discovers the burnt corpse of Esther hidden in a concealed drum. Through a vision, Esther's ghost shows Rosa that Ah Soon raped Esther two years ago on the same day of the Seventh Month. When his parents witnessed the incident, they tried to prevent Esther from calling the police. Mr Teo beat her to the ground, bundled her up and poured oil all over her before setting her on fire, burning her to death.

Frightened by the vision Rosa finally found out what happened to Esther and attempts to escape. Rosa tries to escape but Ah Soon stops her. She quickly finds out that Ah Soon is also a ghost when she tries to stab him, only to realise that he appears unharmed. It turns out that Ah Soon had committed suicide shortly after Esther's death. Instead of passing to the afterlife, he chose to return to the house to find Esther's ghost, whom he was in love with.

Mr Teo suddenly appears and knocks Rosa unconscious and ties her up. When Rosa awakens, she is told by Mrs Teo that the Teos have long believed that ghosts can also marry and their whole motive for inviting her to Singapore was to sacrifice her so that she would be wed to their dead son and to commence the ceremony. When they try to hang Rosa once the ceremony begins, Ah Soon's ghost suddenly remembers the way his father brutally murdered Esther the previous year and tells his parents that he does not want to see any more deaths in the house.

In a scuffle, Ah Soon's ghost accidentally pushes his father towards the altar, spilling oil on him. The oil ignites and causes him to be burnt to death. Rosa manages to break free with the help of Esther's ghost and tries to escape. As the ceremony never came into fruition, Mrs Teo picks up a knife and tries to kill Rosa. Rosa dashes out of the house and crosses the street with Mrs Teo close behind, knife in hand. Rosa stumbles and falls on the other side of the street, but as Mrs Teo approaches, an oncoming truck strikes Mrs Teo in the notoriously unsafe crossing, killing her instantly. Rosa heaves a sigh of relief.

In the final sequence, Rosa is seen heading to the airport to fly back to her hometown on the last day of the Seventh Month when the gates of hell are closing. She takes with her the urn containing Esther's ashes as she enters the airport while the spirits of the Teo family watch her disappear beyond the doors.

== Reception ==
Parvathi Nayar of The Business Times rated the film C+.

== Releases ==
According to Box Office Mojo the film was originally released in Thailand on December 23, 2004. As of 2025, the film has been re-released in North America on AVOD .
