= Michelle Chong =

Singaporean comedian and filmmaker (born 1977)

- Born: 22 April 1977 (age 49); Singapore
- Other name: Zhuang Mixue
- Education: CHIJ St Nicholas Girls' School; Dunman High School; Victoria Junior College; Bates College; National University of Singapore
- Occupations: Actress; comedian; television host; film director; film producer; businesswoman
- Years active: 1999−present

Chinese name
- Traditional Chinese: 莊米雪
- Simplified Chinese: 庄米雪
- Hanyu Pinyin: Zhuāng Mǐxuě

Michelle Chong (born 22 April 1977) is a Singaporean actress, comedian, host, filmmaker, digital content producer and businesswoman. She left Mediacorp in 2011 to set up the media agency Left Profile and production house Huat Films. To date, she has produced, written and directed 3 mainstream films, the first of which, Already Famous, was chosen as Singapore’s entry for Best Foreign Film at the Academy Awards in 2013. Chong is known for her versatility and comedic performances in satire shows such as The Noose and more recently for her online personas "Ah Lian", "Venus Seow" and "Emily 爱美丽", etc., from The Michelle Chong Channel on YouTube.

== Early life ==
Chong studied in CHIJ St Nicholas Girls' School, Dunman High School and Victoria Junior College where she took drama as a subject. Her drama teacher recommended her to Bates College, a top liberal arts college in Maine, USA where she studied theatre for a year. She also subsequently studied in the National University of Singapore.

== Career ==
Chong was voted by FHM readers as one of the world's top 30 sexiest women in 2002 and 2003.

Chong won the Elle Actress of the Year Award (2008) and the Asian Television Awards' (ATV) Best Comedy Performance (Highly Commended) Award (2008) for her portrayal of Beh Li Choo, a butcher in the popular Peranakan dramedy, Sayang Sayang. Chong is also known for portraying a celebrity maid, Leticia Bongnino.

In 2011, Chong took seven months of sabbatical leave to set up her own film company, Huat Films, and produced her first film as director, screenwriter and actress: Already Famous starred her, Taiwanese singer Alien Huang as well as other local celebrities who were cameo appearances in the film.

In 2012, Chong started artiste management agency Left Profile, which manages her, Pornsak and Lee Teng.

In 2015, Chong worked with actress Cynthia Koh, former radio deejay Daniel Ong, and three other partners to open a 180-seater restaurant, Mischief, at Esplanade.

Already Famous was selected as the Singaporean entry for the Best Foreign Language Oscar at the 85th Academy Awards, but it did not make the final shortlist.

== Filmography ==
=== Variety show ===
- 1999
  - 1999 High-Revs
- 2000
  - 2000 Crimewatch
- 2002
  - Happy Rules 开心就好
  - Mars Vs Venus 男人女人 Oh Yeah
  - Open Sesame 芝麻开门客人来
- 2003
  - Bon Voyage 一路风光
  - Oooh! 元气大搜查
  - XXXtraordinary 少见多怪
  - Mission Possible 地球无界限
- 2004
  - Miss Singapore Universe 2004 Finals 新加坡环球小姐选美大决赛 2004
  - All In NETS NETS 有钱坤
  - New City Beat 品味动感辣辣辣
  - Carlsberg World of Friends 好友满天下
  - President’s Star Charity 2004
  - Eye For A Guy
- 2005
  - Fortune Festival at Giant 爱上Giant过肥年
  - Lunar New Year Show
  - Life Scent 花花都市
  - Be A Giant Star 2005 Giant点星光 2005
  - Star Choice 街头美食星
  - Made In Singapore 出奇制胜
  - The Cancer Charity Show 2005 癌过有晴天 2005
  - Wish You Were Here
  - The Sky Symphony Countdown 2006
- 2006
  - PSC Night 普威之夜
  - Battle of The Best 5 强中自有强中手5
  - My Star Guide 我的导游是明星 (season 1)
  - Trivio Trove 2 不说你不知 2
  - Life Scent 2 花花都市 2
  - Seoul Far Seoul Good
  - Rated:E
  - She's The One 亮丽俏佳人
- 2007
  - ChongQing Discovery 麻辣重庆
  - Sweets for my Sweet
  - Adonis Beauty Charter Box ADONIS 美丽论谈
  - Welcome to Taiwan 铁定台湾
  - PSC Night 2007 赢万金游万里 2007
  - The Noose season 1
- 2008
  - Lets Party With Food 5 食福满人间V
  - Sweets for My Sweet 2
  - The Noose Season 2
  - Energy Savers 省电家族
  - Haircare 101 草药护发101
  - Haircare 101 2 草药护发101 II
  - F&B Heroes 餐饮英雄榜
  - National Day Parade 2008
  - New Foreigner in Town

=== Film ===
Year	Title	Role	Notes	Ref
1999	Eating Air	Ah Girl's colleague		
2005	Sitting Ducks			
2011	Already Famous	Ah Kiao	Writer, director and actress	
2013	3 Peas in a Pod	Hotel staff	Writer, producer, director and actress	
2015	Our Sister Mambo			
2016	Lulu the Movie	Lulu	Writer, director and actress	

=== Television series ===
Year	Title	Role	Notes	Ref
1998	Scratch			
1999	Under One Roof			
1999	Triple Nine			
1999	Growing Up			
1999	Phua Chu Kang Pte Ltd			
2000	Sensitive New Age Guy (新好男人)			
2000	It's My Life			
2000	School Days (七彩学堂)			
2001	School Days 2 (七彩学堂 2)			
2001	Robbie and the Book of Tales			
2001	Paradise			
2003	Crunch Time (转捩点)			
2003	Frontline (家在前线)			
2003	Together Whenever (天伦)			
2004	Timeless Gift			
2004	My Lucky Charm			
2005	Baby Blues			
2006	A Million Treasures			
2007	Like Father, Like Daughter			
2007	The Noose - Season 1			
2008	Our Rice House			
2008	Sayang Sayang	Beh Li Choo		
2008	Calefare		Guest starring	
2008	Crime Busters x 2			
2008	The Noose - Season 2			
2010	The Noose - Season 3			
2010	Mrs P.I.			
2010	Black Rose			
2011	The Noose - Season 4			
2011	The Noose - Season 5			

== Theatre ==
- 1995
  - The Bald Soprano
- 1996
  - The Blue Hibiscus
- 1999
  - Love is Not Puttu Mayam
  - Joy Luck Club
  - PIE
  - Ah Kong’s Birthday Party
- 2000
  - Midsummer Night’s Dream 仲夏夜之梦
  - Travelling Light
  - Is This Our Stop?
  - Oleanna
  - The Theory of Everything
- 2001
  - Oleanna
  - The Theory of Everything

== Awards and nominations ==
Year	Award	Category	Nominated work	Result
2004	Star Awards 2004	Best Variety Show Host	All in NETS	Nominated
2005	Star Awards 2005	Top 10 Most Popular Female Artiste	—N/a	Won
2006	Star Awards 2006	Top 10 Most Popular Female Artiste	—N/a	Nominated
2007	Star Awards 2007	Top 10 Most Popular Female Artiste	—N/a	Nominated
2008	Asian Television Awards	Best Comedy Actor/Actress	Sayang Sayang	Commendation
2009	Star Awards 2009	Top 10 Most Popular Female Artiste	—N/a	Nominated
2010	Star Awards 2010	Top 10 Most Popular Female Artiste	—N/a	Nominated
2010	Asian Television Awards	Best Comedy Performance	The Noose 3	Commendation
2011	Star Awards 2011	Top 10 Most Popular Female Artiste	—N/a	Won
2011	Star Awards 2011	Best Variety Show Host	Black Rose	Nominated
2011	Star Awards 2011	Favourite Female Character	"Xie Yuyu" (from Black Rose)	Nominated
2012	Star Awards 2012	Top 10 Most Popular Female Artiste	—N/a	Nominated
2012	Asian Television Awards	Best Comedy Actor / Actress	The Noose	Won
2017	Canada International Film Festival	Best Director	Lulu The Movie	Won
