= The Noose (TV series) =

Singaporean comedy television series

- The title screen of The Noose
- Genre: News satire Comedy; Sitcom
- Created by: Prem Anand
- Written by: Prem Anand
- Starring: Chua Enlai; Alaric Tay; Suhaimi Yusof; Judee Tan; Michelle Chong (Seasons 1–5, 7-); Siti Khalijah (Seasons 7-); Kayly Loh (Seasons 9-); Gurmit Singh (Season 1)
- Country of origin: Singapore
- Original language: English
- No. of episodes: 40 (list of episodes)

Production
- Executive producer: Remesh Kumar
- Producers: Sebastian Leang; Tan Ing How
- Running time: 22 minutes approximately (without commercials)

Original release
- Network: Mediacorp Channel 5 Mediacorp HD5
- Release: November 4, 2007 – October 30, 2016

The Noose is a Singapore news satire sitcom produced by Mediacorp Channel 5, the country's English language channel. It was also one of the most popular Singaporean local sitcoms after Under One Roof, Phua Chu Kang Pte Ltd and Police & Thief.

The name of the show plays on the words The News. The show satirises socio-cultural and political issues in Singapore as well as newsworthy local and regional incidents involving Singapore.

The show has received recognition both locally and internationally. It earned a nomination at the International Emmy Awards 2011 in the comedy category. The cast has also been nominated and won awards and commendations at the Asian Television Awards.

== Overview ==
The Noose is a parody of local news programmes such as News 5 Tonight, with fictional news reports and a presentation mimicking that of the actual news bulletin. For example, every episode of News 5 Tonight begins with a CGI clock indicating the time, while every episode of the first two seasons of The Noose would spoof it by displaying the time using something more mundane, such as a plastic clock hanging on a wall or an alarm clock. At the beginning of every episode, there is a candid disclaimer, voiced by Andre Chichak (portrayed by Alaric Tay), telling the viewers that the stories are not true, most notably by using the line 'Believing us is like believing that...' (e.g., believing that drinking a certain energy drink (Red Bull) makes you fly).

Each episode stars Michelle Chong, Chua Enlai, Alaric Tay and Suhaimi Yusof, with various actors and actresses as newscasters, field reporters and interviewees. The names of characters and issues highlighted in various sketches are often a caricature or parody of a newsworthy incident of the week or are puns on various colloquialisms spoken in Singapore.

== Cast and characters ==
- Chua Enlai (Seasons 1– )
- Alaric Tay (Seasons 1– )
- Suhaimi Yusof (Seasons 2– )
- Judee Tan (Seasons 4– )
- Michelle Chong (Seasons 1–5, 7– )
- Siti Khalijah (Seasons 7– )
- Kayly Loh (Seasons 9– )
- Gurmit Singh (Season 1)

=== Personalities spoofed ===
- Waffles Boo (Woffles Wu)
- MC Teedoh (KF Seetoh)
- Gor Kak (50 Cent)
- Leonard Dhua Bin Chee (Leonardo da Vinci)
- Kelvin Kong (Kelvin Tong)
- Sudah Anandas (Subhas Anandan)
- Sam Tamales/Sam Talames (Mas Selamat)
- MC Kena Hammer (MC Hammer)
- Lady Yahya (Lady Gaga)
- Ling Pan Pan (Pan Lingling)
- Reese Low (Ris Low)
- Robert Downer (Robert Downey Jr.)
- Ban Ki Sun (Ban Ki-moon)
- John Lemon (John Lennon)
- Goh Choon Fung (Goh Choon Phong)
- Conan Schwarzenegger Ismail (Arnold Schwarzenegger)
- Ecuador Saverin Singh (Eduardo Saverin)
- Bukit Brown (Mrbrown)
- Sezailee Skali (Sezairi Sezali)
- Lance Ah Song (Lance Armstrong)
- Ashlee Heesham (Ashley Isham)
- Kim Kah-Da Xian (Kim Kardashian)
- V Mundramsoothy (V. Sundramoorthy)
- Georgie Young (George Young)
- Adrian Pong (Adrian Pang)
- Sharon Ow (Sharon Au)
- Kim Chiong Hil (Kim Jong Il)
- Kim Johnny Un (Kim Jong Un)
- Harry Gan (David Gan)
- Violenz Oon (Violet Oon)
- Nida Goodwood (Nina Goodwood)
- Najib Rasa Sayang (Najib Razak)
- Tom Cook (Tim Cook)
- Samosa Lee/Infamous Amos (Amos Yee)
- Erick Qoo/Eric Kool (Eric Khoo)
- Jek Neo (Jack Neo)
- Jeanette Oww (Jeanette Aw)
- Henderson Pooper (Anderson Cooper)
- Juliette Gizzard (Julia Gillard)
- Shinko Nabe (Shinzo Abe)
- Xoxoxue Xanana (Xiaxue)
- Simone Piles (Simone Biles)
- Duertey Harry (Rodrigo Duterte)
- Ariana Venti (Ariana Grande)
- Kyler Aokley (Tyler Oakley)
- Quah Kim Buaysong (Quah Kim Song)
- Fendi Alamat (Fandi Ahmad)
- Karim Abdul Jaapar (Kareem Abdul-Jabbar)
- Rafael Badal (Rafael Nadal)

== Production ==
The third season began airing on 1 June 2010. The fourth season began airing on 8 March 2011. The fifth season began airing on 27 December 2011 and features topics such as the Mayan Calendar and doomsday and other relevant current issues.

A sixth season began airing on 2 April 2013, aligned with the renumbering of Mediacorp news programmes. Chong did not return to the cast for the sixth season due to a disagreement between Mediacorp and her.

A seventh season began airing on 1 April 2014 (April Fools' Day), with Chong returning to the show as part of the cast and writer for the show.

In 2015, the eighth season was set to be the last season due its lowest ratings but ratings had dropped among Channel 5's programme.

In 2016, a theatrical production, The Noose And Kakis … 11 Months Of Fresh Air, based on the TV series was produced, featuring the original cast and staged at the Mediacorp's building. The production was partly an effort to renew another season, the ninth season. on TV.

== Accolades ==
| Organisation | Year | Category | Nominee(s) | Result | Ref. |
|---|---|---|---|---|---|
| Asian Television Awards | 2010 | Best Comedy Performance | Alaric Tay | Nominated (Highly commended) | |
| Asian Television Awards | 2010 | Best Comedy Performance | Chua En Lai | Won | |
| Asian Television Awards | 2010 | Best Comedy Performance | Michelle Chong | Nominated (Highly commended) | |
| Asian Television Awards | 2010 | Best Comedy Programme | —N/a | Won | |
| Asian Television Awards | 2011 | Best Comedy Performance | Alaric Tay | Nominated (Highly commended) | |
| Asian Television Awards | 2011 | Best Comedy Performance | Chua Enlai | Nominated (Highly commended) | |
| Asian Television Awards | 2011 | Best Comedy Performance | Suhaimi Yusof | Won | |
| Asian Television Awards | 2011 | Best Comedy Programme | —N/a | Won | |
| Asian Television Awards | 2012 | Best Comedy Performance | Michelle Chong | Won | |
| Asian Television Awards | 2012 | Best Comedy Performance | Suhaimi Yusof | Nominated (Highly commended) | |
| Asian Television Awards | 2013 | Best Comedy Performance | Chua En Lai | Won | |
| International Emmy | 2011 | Best Comedy Award | —N/a | Nominated | |

== See also ==
- The Day Today
- Brass Eye
- On The Hour
