= Din Tao: Leader of the Parade =

- Theatrical release poster
- 陣頭
- Directed by: Feng Kai
- Written by: Feng Kai
- Produced by: Biao Hsu
- Starring: Alan Ko; Alien Huang; Crystal Lin; Chen Po-cheng; Samantha Ko; Liao Jun
- Cinematography: Chin Hsin
- Edited by: Ku Hsiao-yun
- Music by: Lu Sheng-fei
- Production company: Magnificent Film Entertainment
- Distributed by: 20th Century Fox
- Release date: 20 January 2012
- Running time: 124 minutes
- Country: Taiwan
- Languages: Taiwanese Hokkien; Mandarin
- Budget: NT$41 million
- Box office: NT$315 million

Din Tao: Leader of the Parade
- Traditional Chinese: 陣頭
- Simplified Chinese: 阵头
- Literal meaning: Leader of the Parade
Transcriptions
Standard Mandarin
- Hanyu Pinyin: Zhèntóu
Southern Min
- Hokkien POJ: Tīn-thâu

Din Tao: Leader of the Parade (Chinese: 陣頭; pinyin: Zhèntóu; Pe̍h-ōe-jī: Tīn-thâu) is a 2012 Taiwanese drama film starring Alan Ko, Alien Huang, Crystal Lin, Chen Po-cheng, Samantha Ko, and Liao Jun. It is directed by Feng Kai, and produced by the Taiwan branch of 20th Century Fox.

The film tells the story of a young man reconciling with his father, reviving his father's troupe, and taking its performance from religious processions to stage. The story is inspired by the story of Jiu-Tian Folk Arts Group (Chinese: 九天民俗技藝團}, whom also appears in the film. The film is mainly in Taiwanese Hokkien with some Taiwanese Mandarin.

The film cost NT$41 million to produce. It was released on 20 January 2012, during the Chinese New Year festival, and earned approximately NT$315 million.

== Plot ==
Ah-Tai (Alan Ko) narrates that he is the son of Uncle Da (Chen Bo-Zheng) and Aunt Da (Samantha Ko), who run a troupe in Taichung. Uncle Da's troupe does traditional performance in front of religious processions. The religion requires performers to "initiate the faces and pose as gods" — to put on a special face painting, or to put on a heavy body puppet costume, both of these represent gods' persona. The performance demands training of martial arts, acrobatics and endurance, and the society associates performers with gangsters. Uncle Da has been competing with Wu-cheng (Liao Jun), who studied with Uncle Da under the same master. Ah-Tai grew estranged with his father and the troupe, and went to Taipei to study Rock Music, until a mysterious old man in a blue coat bids him home.

Ah-Tai's home is a small private temple which also accommodates Uncle Da's troupe, now named Jiu-Tian. The troupe is composed of one young woman Min-min (Crystal Lin) and three young men: Li-Zi is autistic, A-Xin is abused by his father, and Min-Min, A-Kui and Ma-Liya came to Uncle Da's strict discipline to avoid becoming gangsters. Uncle Da is aided by middle-aged Betelnut-Cheng. Betelnut-Cheng is married with a mainlander immigrant wife, and may have to quit the troupe to concentrate on his betelnut stand.

At home Ah-Tai quarrels with Uncle Da and his troupe. They call Ah-Tai "Three Minutes" because he cannot commit himself long enough. Meanwhile, the Jiu-Tian Troupe is pushed out of business by Wu-Cheng's troupe. With the support of Aunt Da, Ah-Tai challenges Wu-Cheng and his son Ah-Xian (Alien Huang): Ah-Tai takes charge of the Jiu-Tian Troupe, and promises that under his leadership, the Jiu-Tian Troupe will defeat Wu-Cheng's troupe in six months, or else the Jiu-Tian Troupe will leave Taichung altogether.

As he takes charge, Ah-Tai learns the art of the troupe and the difficulties of each troupe member. Ah-Tai starts training them with drumming, and tries to use stage elements and create a new performance that "earns respect without initiating the face and posing as gods." Uncle Da is against Ah-Tai's idea, and all crew members are loyal to Uncle Da. Ah-Tai insists on his authority, and takes the troupe on a tour to circle the Taiwan island on foot. Outside the troupe, Ah-Tai is also challenged by Ah-Xian, who performs the challenging sequence of "Settling Camp" before him.

On their island tour, the Jiu-Tian Troupe performed drumming before a temple. Ah-Tai's style is accepted by the crowd and other troupes, and Ah-Tai earns the hearts of all the troupe members. The tour also attracts coverage of TV show host Xiao-Bi (Esther Liu) and becomes famous. Ah-Xian, though antagonistic to Ah-Tai, admires Ah-Tai's will to take over his father's place. Both Xiao-Bi and Min-Min develop romantic interest in Ah-Tai, but Ah-Tai only sees Min-Min and Xiao-Bi gives up.

After the Jiu-Tian Troupe returns to Taichung, they win the promised contest with Wu-Cheng's group. Ah-Xian eventually joins Ah-Tai, and the two young men want to combine the two troupes to perform on the "International Cultural Festival" hosted by the Taichung government. However their fathers reject the plan. The man in blue coat shows up again and is revealed to be the master of Uncle Da and Wu-Cheng. He beats the two disciples and lectures them. Later in the temple, the two fathers reconcile each other and their sons and the two troupes join hands for the Festival.

On the night of the festival, the Jiu-Tian Troupe performed on a stage in the amphitheater of an urban park. the Jiu-tian Troupe's new style of performance modifies the face painting and costumes, and is combined with stage props, effects, performers' vocals and electric guitars. They win the respect of their families, the master, and all other audiences. Ah-Tai's narration concludes that his way now earns Uncle Da's support, and the Jiu-Tian Troupe undergoes an even more difficult training including climbing Mount Yu and passing Sahara desert, Africa.

== Cast ==
- Alan Ko as A-tai (Chen Yong-tai)
- Alien Huang as A-hsien
- Crystal Lin as Min Min
- Chen Po-cheng as Uncle Da
- Samantha Ko as Aunt Da
- Liao Jun as Wu Zheng
- Esther Liu as Hsiao-bi

== Production ==
The film's director Fung Kai is a TV producer and director who has worked with Sanlih E-Television (SET TV) on many Taiwanese Hokkien-language dramas and idol dramas. He won the Golden Bell Award with Green Forest, My Home. He co-wrote the screenplay of the movie with Xu Zhao-ren, who is also known for directing idol dramas. The film is produced by Xu Xi-biao and the sound engineer was Du Du-zhi, an award-winning recordist. The cinematographer is Chin Hsin, who has directed many music videos. The film is edited by Gu Xiaoyun.

Senior actors Chen Po-cheng, Samantha Ko and Liao Jun have long experience with Taiwanese speaking movie and TV dramas. They also have hosted outdoor TV shows for SET TV.

Younger actors are mostly singers, and actors from idol dramas. Alan Ko had previously played various supporting and minor roles. Alien Huang has starred leading roles in many idol dramas and movies. Crystal Lin debuted from talent show One Million Star. All these young actors had to live with the real Jiu-tian Group in container houses for months in order to train for the performance.

On the other hand, Chen Shi-Min (陳世旻, also known as Ma-Liya) in reality is a mainstay of the real Jiu-Tian Group. The real Jiu-Tian Group performed for the filmmaking. Though the background story was inspired by the real Jiu-Tian Group, many events, such as the father-son conflict and quick rise to fame, are fictional.

TV host Tao Ching-Ying, and the then Taichung City mayor Jason Hu, also made cameos on the Festival scene. Tao's husband Li Li-Ren also played a minor role.

=== Filming locations ===
- A-Tai's home in Taichung is the Jyou-Tian Folk Drum and Arts Group. It is a small private temple on a hill, built with light steel frame and plates. The temple worships Taoist goddess Jiu-Tian Xuannv (Chinese: 九天玄女; pinyin: Jiǔtiān Xuánnü). On the two sides of the temple are a storage room and several container houses, where the troupe members stay.
- Locations in Taichung: Dadu Plateau; Jiu-Tian Xuannv Temple; Zhuifen Station; Central Science Park; Taichung Metropolitan Park; nightmarket near Tunghai University; and Fulfillment Amphitheater (the Festival scene).
- Locations in island tour: Xiluo Bridge, Zhuoshui River; Dapeng Bay Bridge, Pingtung; East Haven Palace of Eastern Prosperity in Donggang, Pingtung; Kenting National Park; Southern Cross-Island Highway; Tropic of Cancer Monument in Fengbin, Hualien; Suhua Highway; Guandu Bridge; Provincial Highway No. 14A; Hehuanshan.

== Reception ==
The film was a success at the box office, earning approximately NT$315 million in Taiwan, placing it on the list of the highest-grossing films of Taiwan.

Ho Yi from Taipei Times commented that the film follows the formula "that blends traditional practices with modern elements," yet Ho notes that "without a good story line and emotional depth to sustain it, the enthusiasm for traditional culture would not have lasted the distance." Lin Yu-ting from China Post commented that the characters are interesting but "Ah-tai's inner transformation into a true leader, however, is unconvincing", and questioned the theme: "are the traditional images and practices really so unsalvageable that they must be thus displaced?" However Lin noted that "I have been won over by the movie's attempt".
