= Wu Han-chun =

Taiwanese cheerleader, television presenter, and entertainer (born 1990)

- Wu in 2026
- Born: 19 April 1990 (age 36); Tainan, Taiwan
- Other names: Qun Qun (峮峮); Shan Qun (山君); QUN
- Education: Southern Taiwan University of Science and Technology; China University of Technology
- Occupations: Cheerleader; television presenter; entertainer
- Years active: 2016–present
- Musical career
- Origin: Taiwan
- Genre: C-pop
- Instrument: Vocals
- Label: Media Drive Dorian Entertainment
- Website: 中信兄弟官方網站 宏將多利安官方網站

Wu Han-chun
- Traditional Chinese: 吳函峮
Transcriptions
Standard Mandarin
- Hanyu Pinyin: Wú Hánqūn

Wu Han-chun (Chinese: 吳函峮; pinyin: Wú Hánqūn; born April 19, 1990), also known professionally as Qun Qun (Chinese: 峮峮) or simply Qun, is a Taiwanese cheerleader, television presenter, and entertainer. She is best known as a member of Passion Sisters, the cheerleading group for the CTBC Brothers since 2016, as well as co-host of The Hunger Games from 2021 to 2026.

== Personal life ==
Qun had been dating Alien Huang for a year and a half until he died on September 23, 2020. Their relationship had been rumored, but was not confirmed until she made an Instagram post acknowledging Huang's death.

On May 7, 2024, Qun became the Taiwanese Ambassador for World Asthma Day. She admitted that she is an asthma sufferer since she was in kindergarten.
