= Jade Rasif =

- Born: 21 January 1994 (age 32); Singapore
- Education: National University of Singapore
- Occupations: disc jockey, former actress, former model
- Years active: 2013–present
- Children: 1 son
- Parents: David Rasif (father); Joyce Fong (mother)
- Family: Tyen Rasif (sister)
- Musical career
- Origin: Singapore
- Instrument: DJ mixer
- Years active: 2013–present
- Website: Jade Rasif on Facebook; Jade Rasif on Instagram

Jade Rasif (born 21 January 1994) is a Singaporean DJ, YouTube personality and former actress.

== Background ==
Jade Rasif was born in Singapore on 21 January 1994 and is the eldest of three sisters. She is noted to be the daughter of the fugitive lawyer, David Rasif who ran off with S$11.3 million of his clients' money in 2006. She was placed as first runner-up in New Paper New Face 2013. She is also known for playing Sheila Oh on Tanglin, from seasons 1 to 3.

Rasif has performed in Singapore, Thailand, and Malaysia .

Rasif graduated with a degree in psychology from the Faculty of Arts and Social Sciences, National University of Singapore.

== Personal life ==
In early November 2018, Rasif revealed she was about seven and a half months pregnant. She gave birth in December, becoming a single parent.

== Filmography ==
=== Television dramas ===
Year	Title	Role	Network	Note
2015–2018	Tanglin	Sheila Oh	Mediacorp Channel 5	
