= Love & Hero =

Studio album by Alien Huang
- Released: 24 December 2009
- Genre: Mandopop, rock
- Length: 45:06
- Language: Mandarin
- Label: Rock Records
- Producer: Di Zi, Bi Guoyong, Guo Jianliang

Alien Huang chronology
Alien Huang 1st EP (2009)	Love & Hero (2009)	Heart Amulet (single) (2010)

Alternative cover

Love & Hero (Chinese: 愛&英雄) is Taiwanese Mandopop artist Alien Huang's Mandarin solo debut studio album. It was released on 24 December 2009 by Rock Records and on 5 February 2010 a commemorate edition was released containing a bonus DVD version.

The album debuted at number one on Taiwan's G-Music Weekly Combo and Mandarin Charts, and number two on Five Music Chart.

His song "Screwed it Up" was written by two members from Mayday, vocalist Ashin and guitarist Wen Shang-yi, known as Monster for the first time collaborate, as well as Wu Bai with "Love Hero".

== Track listing ==
1. "玩具槍與玫瑰" (Toy Guns & Roses)
2. "搞砸了" (Screwed it Up)
3. "我不要長生不老" (I Don't Want Immortality)
4. "沒人愛俱樂部" (Loveless Club)
5. "為自己" (For Myself)
6. "懶得理你" (Not Bothered With You)
7. "地球上最浪漫的一首歌" (World's Most Romantic Song)
8. "總冠軍" (Final Champion)
9. "不要就拉倒" (Do Not Leave It)
10. "Love Hero"
11. "不屑" (Disdain)

== Bonus DVD ==
Live & Love: Alien Hunag «Final Champion» Collectible Edition
黃鴻升『Love_Hero總冠軍』珍藏特輯

- Length: 60 mins
1. 100 days of album recording
2. Styling of Love_Hero
3. MV's Making of
4. "玩具槍與玫瑰" (Toy Guns and Roses) MV
5. "搞砸了" (Screwed Up) MV
6. "地球上最浪漫的一首歌" (World's Most Romantic Song) MV

== Charts ==
Chart Name	Debut Position	Week# / Week Dates of Peak Position	Peak Position	Percentage of Album Sales at Peak	Chart Run
Five Music Taiwan; 5大金榜	#2	#52/ 18–24 December 2009	#2	8.29%	11 weeks
G-Music Combo Chart, Taiwan 風雲榜 (綜合榜)	#1	#51 / 18–24 December 2009	#1	11.8%	7 Weeks
G-Music Mandarin Chart, Taiwan 風雲榜 (華語榜)	#1	#51 / 18–24 December 2009	#1	16.39%	9 Weeks
