= Cai Mingjie =

Singaporean taxicab driver and blogger

Cai Mingjie (Chinese: 蔡明杰, born 1952) is a Chinese-born Singaporean taxicab driver and former biology researcher, known for his blog, A Singapore Taxi Driver's Diary. He is described variously as "Singapore's most educated taxi driver" and "the only taxi driver with a Ph.D.".

== Biography ==
Cai was born in China. He received his Ph.D. in molecular biology from Stanford University in 1990, and worked for 16 years as a researcher at the Agency for Science, Technology and Research's Institute of Molecular and Cell Biology. In May 2008, he was one of the first few Principal Investigators of the institute to be laid off. After several failed job applications, he chose to become a taxi driver in November 2008. With the SG$77/day rent for his Toyota Crown, he said in September 2009 that his take-home pay comes out to between $30 and $50 per day.

Cai began blogging about his experiences as a taxi driver, acquiring a large following of fans and even offers of employment. In April 2010, he published a compilation of stories about his taxi driving. A movie based on the book, Taxi! Taxi!, was released in Singapore in 2013.

In 2010, Cai returned to China as Legal Representative and general manager of Hongye Innovative Antibody Technologies Co., Ltd.

== Selected publications ==
- Cai, Mingjie; Davis, Ronald W. (May 1990), "Yeast centromere binding protein CBF1, of the helix-loop-helix protein family, is required for chromosome stability and methionine prototrophy", Cell, 61 (3): 437–446, doi:10.1016/0092-8674(90)90525-J, PMID 2185892
- Cai, Mingjie, Diary of a taxi driver : true stories from Singapore's most educated cabdriver, Singapore: Aktive Learning, ISBN 978-981-08-5020-3

== See also ==
- Taxicabs of Singapore
