= 128 Circle =

Singaporean TV series

- Genre: Drama
- Created by: Lee Thean-jeen
- Country of origin: Singapore
- Original languages: English; Mandarin; Malay; Tamil
- No. of seasons: 3
- No. of episodes: 45

Original release
- Network: Channel 5
- Release: October 7, 2019 – present

128 Circle is a Singaporean television series on Channel 5. It is the first multilingual drama TV series produced by Weiyu Films Pte Ltd for Mediacorp. The series started airing on October 7, 2019.

== Story ==
The series tells the story of food vendors at 128 Circle food centre and their customers. They come from various ethnic backgrounds and reflect Singapore's passion for food.

A drama unique to Singapore`s multiracial fabric, 128 Circle is the nation’s first multilingual television drama, following the lives of a group of hawkers (street food sellers) in the fictional 128 Circle Food Centre. Season 1 saw the introduction of the hawkers as they faced their own personal challenges and collectively, the looming closure of their beloved hawker centre. In Season 2, the hawkers weather not only the storms of a global pandemic that spares no one; they must also contend with ups and downs of family, friendship and life in Singapore. Season 3 follows the hawkers struggling with rising costs, personal issues and a group of newer, younger hawkers brought in to refresh the hawker centre.

== Cast ==
- Ashwini Nambiar as Rani
- Chase Tan as Chen Yi Kai
- Constance Lau as Audrey Low
- Daren Tan as Dominic Yang (season 1)
- Jae Liew as Sherry Yang (seasons 1–2; also starring season 3)
- Jitenram Kiran Bala as Arun
- Peggy Tan as Ah Gek (seasons 1–2)
- Candice Tan as Michelle (seasons 1-3)
- Sharon Ismail as Aishah
- Siti Hajar Gani as Nurul
- Silvarajoo Parakasam as Chandra Ganesan
- Duan Weiming as Larry
- Charlie Goh as Ethan Wong (seasons 2–3)
- Terence Cao as Henry Low (season 2; also starring season 3)
- Adam Chen as Vincent Wong (season 3)
- Hanan Helme as Filzah (season 3)
- Nicole Liel as Elysha (season 3)
- Tang Miao Ling as Carol (season 3)
- Zhin Sadali as Rafiq (season 3)

== Episodes ==
=== Season 1 ===
No. overall	No. in season	Title	Original release date
1	1	"Wake Up, Halim"	October 7, 2019
2	2	"How Come the Mee Rebus Stall Is Closed?"	October 7, 2019
3	3	"No One Is Scared of You Anymore"	October 7, 2019
4	4	"You Really Think This Will Work?"	October 7, 2019
5	5	"It's Going To Be a Long Month"	October 21, 2019
6	6	"I'm Looking for My Father"	October 21, 2019
7	7	"You Think I Should Get a Lawyer?"	October 21, 2019
8	8	"Leave My Family Alone"	October 21, 2019
9	9	"Have a Nice Day, Everyone"	November 4, 2019
10	10	"I Gave Everything to that Crook!"	November 4, 2019
11	11	"I Might Lose My Daughter!"	November 4, 2019
12	12	"He's Doing this for Revenge"	November 4, 2019
13	13	"How Can You Sabotage Your Own Brother?"	November 18, 2019
14	14	"Food Poisoning?"	November 18, 2019
15	15	"Bye Uncle Larry, Bye Aunty Gek"	November 18, 2019

=== Season 2 ===
No. overall	No. in season	Title	Original release date
16	1	"We Are Here Today"	March 7, 2022
17	2	"We're Doing the Best We Can"	March 7, 2022
18	3	"Singapore Has Gone into Circuit Breaker Mode"	March 7, 2022
19	4	"Can We Start"	March 7, 2022
20	5	"You Know Each Other?"	March 21, 2022
21	6	"I Thought You Threw that Away Last Night"	March 21, 2022
22	7	"Coffee"	March 21, 2022
23	8	"I Can't Believe You Would Do this"	March 21, 2022
24	9	"Crazy"	April 4, 2022
25	10	"Can Pass Me the Ladle"	April 4, 2022
26	11	"The Ambulance Is on the Way"	April 4, 2022
27	12	"She's Your Sister"	April 4, 2022
28	13	"Watch Out"	April 18, 2022
29	14	"Police Are Coming"	April 18, 2022
30	15	"This Is Her Place"	April 18, 2022

=== Season 3 ===
No. overall	No. in season	Title	Original release date
31	1	"Good News or Bad News"	January 8, 2024
32	2	"No Need To See Doctor"	January 8, 2024
33	3	"I Am In Trouble Again"	January 8, 2024
34	4	"You Want To Quit"	January 8, 2024
35	5	"I Am Still Your Mother"	January 22, 2024
36	6	"There Is A Thief"	January 22, 2024
37	7	"I Have COVID"	January 22, 2024
38	8	"She Will Have To Close"	January 22, 2024
39	9	"You Expect Us To Believe Your Flimsy Excuse"	February 5, 2024
40	10	"Just Like The Good Old Days"	February 5, 2024
41	11	"We Are Going To Fight"	February 5, 2024
42	12	"Well Done Yi Kai"	February 5, 2024
43	13	"That Bloody Larry"	February 19, 2024
44	14	"Why Do You Want Me To Take Over"	February 19, 2024
45	15	"Today Is My Last Day"	February 19, 2024
