= 3 Peas in a Pod =

2013 Singaporean film

- Directed by: Michelle Chong
- Produced by: Michelle Chong; Pauline Yu; Irving Artemas
- Starring: Jae Liew; Alexander Lee Eusebio; Calvin Chen
- Production companies: Huat Films; Brainstorminx
- Release date: 14 November 2013
- Running time: 90 minutes
- Country: Singapore
- Languages: English; Mandarin
- Budget: $1.7 million

3 Peas in a Pod (Chinese: 他她他) is a 2013 Singaporean romantic drama film directed by Michelle Chong. The film was the acting debut of Jae Liew.

== Plot ==
Singaporean Penny, Korean Peter, and Taiwanese Perry are schoolmates at an Australian University. Just before graduation, they decide to take a road trip together.

== Cast ==
- Jae Liew as Penny Yang
- Alexander Lee Eusebio as Peter
- Calvin Chen as Perry
- Michelle Chong as hotel staff

== Release ==
The film released in theatres in Singapore and Japan on 14 November 2013.

== Reception ==
Gwendolyn Ng of My Paper rated the film 2.5 stars out of 5, writing "Chong's sophomore film turns out to be a rather bumpy ride. This is especially so when the plot takes an abrupt, miscalculated turn towards the end that leaves viewers bewildered." Boon Chan of The Straits Times rated the film 2 stars out of 5, criticising the characters, the casting and the final act of the film. Jocelyn Lee of The New Paper rated the film 2 stars out of 5, writing "The twist which happens way too abruptly is bound to leave viewers feeling mystified and unsatisified." Lin Mingwen of My Paper rated the film 2 stars out of 5, praising the first hour of the film, while criticising the final act.
