= Lulu the Movie =

2016 Singaporean film

Lulu The Movie
- Theatrical release poster
- Traditional Chinese: 露露的電影
- Simplified Chinese: 露露的电影
- Literal meaning: "Lulu's Movie"
- Hanyu Pinyin: Lùlù de Diànyǐng
- Directed by: Michelle Chong
- Written by: Michelle Chong
- Produced by: Michelle Chong; Tan Choon Hiong; Diana Chong
- Starring: Michelle Chong; Leon Jay Williams; Chen Tianwen
- Cinematography: Eric Low
- Edited by: Yim Mun Chong
- Music by: Wayne Khin
- Distributed by: Cathay-Keris Films; Huat Films
- Release date: 24 November 2016 (Singapore)
- Running time: 103 minutes
- Country: Singapore
- Languages: Mandarin; English
- Budget: S$1.5 million
- Box office: S$ 2.1 million

Lulu The Movie (Chinese: 露露的电影) is a 2016 Singaporean comedy film written, directed by and starring Michelle Chong as the titular protagonist.

== Plot ==
Lulu (Michelle Chong) is a woman from Shanghai, China, who came to Singapore with the intent of meeting her online date, "Brad Pit" (Chen Tianwen). Expecting him to be a tall, rich and handsome man, upon realizing that he was the complete opposite and that he has displayed a photograph of his twin brother, Leon (Leon Jay Williams) online, she instantly fell in love with Leon. In order not to lose face back at her hometown, Lulu decided to stay in Singapore and make a living for herself. In order to sustain herself, Lulu took up several jobs besides working at a nightclub as a KTV hostess. During her first date with Leon, he became upset with her for being an embarrassment and insisted on her posing as his girlfriend, Sonia (Michelle Chong), a fashion show host. She got mad with him and gave him a good dressing down before storming out of the restaurant. A video of the incident was posted online by Leon's bad friend and prankster, Alfred (Glenn Ong), causing her to become an Internet celebrity.

Upon being discovered by the TV station, Lulu was given the opportunity to host an English-language fashion show. However, with her unique understanding in the English language and her refusal to conform to normal standards, her show became top-rated, even catching the eye of Karl Lagerfeld (The Flying Dutchman). Throughout her journey, although she met with mockery, discrimination and tough times, Lulu refused to give up or compromise.

== Cast ==
- Michelle Chong as Lulu/Sonia
- Leon Jay Williams as Leon
- Chen Tianwen as Brad Pit
- Glenn Ong as Alfred
- Mark van Cuylenburg (The Flying Dutchman) as Karl Lagerfeld
- Prem Lulla as Rajesh
- Vanness Wu
- Sharon Au
- Terence Cao
- Shane Pow
- Suhaimi Yusof
- Jamie Chua
- Dee Kosh
- May Seah as Unknown KTV Hostess
- Tan Jian Hao
- Michelle Tan
- Joanna Lim as Dior
- Aylna Neo as Gucci
- Aurelia Ng as Chanel
- Jazliyana Lee as Ferrari
- Bailey Tan
- Tan Choon Hiong
- Chris Armstrong as Seth

== Production ==
=== Pre-production ===
In February 2014, Chong announced that she would be making a film based on Lulu, one of the main characters of The Noose, after conducting a survey in which Lulu came in top, among other characters such as Barbarella, due to the fact that everyone is preoccupied with Mainland Chinese immigrants.

=== Casting and crew ===
On April 26, 2014, an audition was held at Bugis Junction for members of the public to be part of the film, as part of the celebrations for World Intellectual Property Day 2014. It was also announced then that the film would take the form of a mockumentary, with real as well as scripted reactions.

Chong had initially planned for Lulu The Movie to be released in early 2015, but due to her involvement with other projects and the fact that there were several films released during Singapore's golden jubilee, it was postponed to late 2016.

Williams was cast as the male lead in Lulu due to his close friendship with Chong, and that he had played "the posh guy in a suit" in several films and dramas. Ong was cast to play the role of Alfred, possibly due to his negative public image during his radio career. In order to play the role of Lagerfeld, The Flying Dutchman "took his role very seriously", watched videos of Lagerfeld's interviews on set and mastered his "thick German accent"

=== Filming ===
Filming started in late 2014 with an initial budget of S$1.2 million, with some scenes shot in London and Shanghai, among other major cities, and others shot in various parts of Singapore.

== Reception ==
=== Critical reception ===
John Lui of The Straits Times rated Lulu a 3.5 out of 5 stars, commenting that the first half of the film is "a chaotic jumble of vignettes dealing with Lulu's fish-out-of-water problems", often involving bilingual puns, and "feels like the veggies that must be consumed before dessert is served". The second half, on the other hand, involves her journey from rags to riches, and is described as a combination of fact and fiction, much like Borat and Brüno, in which Lulu, as a fashion host, interviews bystanders in London and Shanghai "in which she mocks her own wardrobe ... while subtly exposing their assumptions about people from China".

Gabriel Chong of MovieXclusive.com rated Lulu a 1.5 out of 5 stars, stating that "it is a badly formed movie with a bare-bones narrative, little to none character development and surprisingly witless jokes that can't even match that of the YouTube clips which have made her character so popular and endearing in the first place".

=== Box office ===
Lulu earned roughly $650,000 in its first weekend in Singapore, making it the third highest-grossing movie over that period, after Fantastic Beasts and Where to Find Them and Moana.

== Music ==
On November 13, 2016, the music video of Michelle Chong's "Pin Pin Pin!" (拼拼拼), composed by Wayne Khin, was released on YouTube and the film's official Facebook page. On November 23, Tay Kewei released her single, a cover of Chang Yu-sheng's "Missing You Everyday" (天天想你), which was featured in the film.
