= Already Famous =

2011 film

- Film poster
- Traditional Chinese: 一泡而紅
- Simplified Chinese: 一泡而红
- Hanyu Pinyin: Yī pào ér hóng
- Directed by: Michelle Chong
- Written by: Michelle Chong
- Produced by: Huat Films
- Starring: Michelle Chong; Alien Huang
- Cinematography: Meng Fye Wong
- Edited by: Jin Yan
- Music by: Joshua Chia
- Distributed by: Cathay-Keris Films
- Release date: 1 December 2011
- Running time: 120 minutes
- Country: Singapore
- Language: Chinese
- Box office: $1.4 million

Already Famous (Chinese: 一泡而红) is a 2011 Singaporean comedy film and the feature film directorial debut of Michelle Chong, who also starred in the film alongside Taiwanese idol Alien Huang. The movie was released on 1 December 2011 in Singapore and was selected as the Singaporean entry for the Best Foreign Language Oscar at the 85th Academy Awards 2013.

Already Famous was well received in Singapore, where it grossed S$1.04 million and viewer demand for the film grew so high that movie theaters had to double the number of screens showing the film.

== Plot ==
Ah Kiao is a young village woman from Yong Peng, Malaysia, who spends much of her time dreaming about becoming a famous actor like the ones she sees in her beloved soap operas, much to the chagrin of her family. Despite her family's disapproval, she travels to Singapore to chase her dream and ends up taking on a job as a salesgirl to make ends meet while auditioning. During her stay, Ah Kiao meets a handsome coffee shop worker, which threatens to distract her from her dream.

== Cast ==
- Michelle Chong as Ah Kiao
- Alien Huang as Christopher / Ah Seng
- Chua Enlai as Vaness
- David Gan as Celebrity hair stylist
- Sherry Lim as Hair salon receptionist
- Patricia Mok as Modeling agency booker
- Ernest Seah as Earness
- Hee Ker Ru as Little Ah Kiao
- Hao Jun Cai as Little Ah Kiao's Brother
- Wilson Ng as Ah Kiao Father
- Meng Chue Lok as Kiao's Grandmother
- Irene Ang

== Release ==
The film had its sneak preview on 24 November and was officially released on 1 December.

== Reception ==
=== Box office ===
The film grossed S$415,000 in its opening weekend and grossed $1.4 million.

=== Critical response ===
The Hollywood Reporter gave Already Famous a mixed review, writing "This lightweight film drags on for two hours, when 90 minutes would have been just about right. Still, the likable cast and knowing touches keep us watching right up until the end credits, which feature the same kind of outrageous out-takes that end many American comedies." Variety was more positive in their review, where they called it "A cheery hoot that pokes fun at showbiz pomposity even as it affirms its protag's impervious optimism."

== See also ==
- List of submissions to the 85th Academy Awards for Best Foreign Language Film
- List of Singaporean submissions for the Academy Award for Best Foreign Language Film
