= Taxi! Taxi! (2013 film) =

2013 Singaporean film

- Theatrical release poster
- Directed by: Kelvin Sng
- Screenplay by: Boris Boo; Lee Chee Tian; Violet Lai
- Story by: Boris Boo; Rebecca Leow; Chan Pui Yin; Kelvin Sng
- Based on: Diary of a Taxi Driver: True Stories From Singapore's Most Educated Cabdriver by Cai Mingjie
- Produced by: Chan Pui Yin; Chan Yan Yan
- Starring: Gurmit Singh; Mark Lee; Jazreel Low; Gan Mei Yan; Lai Meng; Royston Ong; Chua Jin Sen (a.k.a. Dr Jia Jia)
- Edited by: Yim Mun Chong
- Music by: Alex Oh
- Distributed by: Golden Village Pictures
- Release date: 3 January 2013 (Singapore)
- Running time: 93 minutes
- Country: Singapore
- Languages: Mandarin; English
- Budget: S$1 million
- Box office: S$1.45 million

Taxi! Taxi! (Chinese: 德士当家; pinyin: déshì dāngjiā) is a 2013 Singaporean comedy film based on the 2010 work Diary Of A Taxi Driver by Cai Mingjie, said to be "Singapore's most well-educated taxi-driver". Directed by Kelvin Sng and produced by Chan Pui Yin and Chan Yan Yan for SIMF Management, the film stars Gurmit Singh, Mark Lee and YouTube personality Chua Jin Sen, better known by his online handle "Dr. Jia Jia". It is Chua's professional film debut. The film follows two fellow taxi-drivers' (Lee and Singh) quest for self-discovery. Distributed by Golden Village Pictures, the film was commercially released in Singapore on 3 January 2013 and slated for a 24 January 2013 release in Malaysia. This film also marks the second on-screen pairing of Singh and Lee after One Leg Kicking, which was released on 14 November 2001. The comedy duo also collaborated again later in the year where they both starred in the movie known as Everybody's Business, which would mark their third collaboration and was released on 5 December 2013.

== Plot ==
In the film's prelude, PhD microbiologist Professor Chua See Kiat (Gurmit Singh) is hanging out on a rooftop when a taxi driver named Lee Ah Tau (Mark Lee) mistook him for attempting suicide. This leads to Ah Tau receiving a fine for illegal parking.

After several attempts to find a new job, Professor Chua had no choice but to resort to driving a taxi. Ah Tau volunteered to assist him and became his first passenger. Soon after, Ah Tau was fined again for another incident of illegal parking.

While Professor Chua was picking up his mother-in-law from the airport, he happened to get into a taxi driven by Ah Tau, whose son was also in the vehicle. Ah Tau began discussing Professor Chua's new career as a taxi driver, nearly revealing this information to his wife and mother-in-law, who were unaware of it beforehand. This caused a strain on the friendship between Professor Chua and Ah Tau.

The film portrays the challenges faced by Professor Chua as he encounters difficult customers, including one who refused to pay their fare. Ah Tau helps by recording the incident, during which he gets punched by the gangsters. The gangsters are subsequently apprehended, and Professor Chua rewards Ah Tau with a mobile phone as a gesture of gratitude. However, he still must confront his wife, who is in tears. He explains the situation to her, and she promises not to tell anyone about his new job.

Professor Chua's son, Jonah Chua, discovers his father's taxi driving when the latter inadvertently picks him and his girlfriend up as passengers. Jonah decides to stop speaking to his father. Ah Tau also gets into a family dispute for showing his son, Lee Jia Jia, edited pictures of his long-lost mother. Jia Jia realises that both Ah Tau and Regina had edited the images, which leads him to cease communication with his father. The two men share their grievances and decide to support each other moving forward.

The next day, Professor Chua notices that his mother is missing from the house and resolves to mobilise all the taxi drivers to find her successfully, which gives him a better understanding of ‘taxi culture’. Professor Chua also aids Ah Tau by improving his son Jia Jia’s English and attempts to find a suitable school for him. While Ah Tau sets a date with Regina, (Gan Mei Yan) he is caught by a police officer (Chua En Lai) who gives a longwinded 'speech' about the perils of an illegal U-turn. His taxi runs out of fuel and he is forced to take another taxi before being caught by the same policeman as he repeats the same 'speech'. Regina feels that Ah Tau isn't worth the wait and stomps off into the streets, leading into a car accident. While she is in hospital, she finds out that her vision was impaired and she is unable to fulfill her dream to be a fashion designer. This leads to her attempting suicide on the hospital's roof. Prof Chua explains the situation Regina is in to Ah Tau, who is in the middle of his son's performance. While he is on his way, Prof Chua tells Regina his story of being a cab driver, which then calms her down and changes her mind about the suicide. It is recorded as his son watches it live.

A few years later, Jonah begins idolizing his father again. While Prof Chua regains his job as a professor, he still wants to continue his taxi driving. Regina became a DJ as she falls in love with Ah Tau. The film ends with Prof Chua and Ah Tau driving off into the sunset.

== Cast ==
- Gurmit Singh as Professor Chua See Kiat, a retrenched microbiologist
- Mark Lee as Lee Ah Tau, a veteran Ah Beng taxi driver
- Royston Ong as Jonah Chua, Chua See Kiat's son
- Jazreel Low as Chua See Kiat's wife. Director Kelvin Sng stated that he chose her for the role as:

There is something about her that is very charming and elegant, which was what I wanted for the role

- Lai Meng as Chua See Kiat's mother-in-law
- Chua Jin Sen as Lee Jia Jia, Lee Ah Tau's son. It is his film debut. Sng said of him:

He is so popular on YouTube because he is such a natural, so we made use of this quality, put him together with Mark [Lee], and we think it worked very well.

- Chua En Lai as a police officer
- Gan Mei Yan as Lee Ah Tau's tenant, Regina.

== Production ==
=== Development ===
Inspiration was largely drawn from real life blogger Cai Mingjie's personal recounts in his 2010 best selling work, Diary of a Taxi Driver: True Stories From Singapore's Most Educated Cabdriver. Boris Boo, Lee Chee Tian and Violet Lai served as screenwriters. Boo, Rebecca Leow, Chan and Sng were credited with writing the story. Chua Jin Sen (better known as Dr Jia Jia)'s involvement in the project kindled public interest. His participation in the film was first mentioned by his mother in June 2012, who told Yahoo! Singapore:

We decided to allow Jiajia to participate in this movie because they were willing to accommodate his schoolwork schedule and they were also very sincere in their approach.

She also gave some details about his role, but a confidentiality agreement prevented her from stating more at that time. Greater details about the film were disclosed at a July 2012 press conference, where director Kelvin Sng said [relating to Chua's role]:

We've scripted his role according to his personality and what viewers are already familiar with from his skits on YouTube... He will be sprouting [sic] a lot of Singlish, that's for sure

After One Leg Kicking, we haven't had time to meet... Mark's too busy, while I've been homeless and jobless.

— Gurmit Singh, cited in

This film also marks the second on-screen pairing of Singh and Lee since their 2001 collaboration, One Leg Kicking. Singh attributed this to the "lack of suitable scripts". It is also Singh's first feature-length film since Phua Chu Kang The Movie (2010). This film also marks the comeback of former actress Jazreel Low.

=== Financing and filming ===
Financiers for Taxi! Taxi! included SIMF Management, Galaxy Entertainment, sglanded.net, Widescreen Media, RAM Entertainment and PMP Entertainment. With a budget of S$1 million, production commenced on July 12, 2012. Actual filming begun on July 16, 2012. A particular scene required Chua to be shot from various angles, resulting in many takes. This reportedly made Chua feel frustrated. His mother said of the scenario:

Jia Jia [a reference to Chua's online handle] did not get why he had to re-do the scenes so many times. He thought it was all his fault and started getting very frustrated, even though I could tell that he was really trying as hard as he could. It was very painful for a mother to watch.

== Reception ==
=== Box office ===
Commercially released in Singaporean cinemas on January 3, 2013, Taxi! Taxi! grossed S$592,000 in its opening weekend. In total it took in $1.45 million, making it the second-highest grossing Singaporean film of 2013, after Ah Boys to Men 2.

=== Critical response ===
Film magazine F***'s Raphael Lim dubbed the film as "run of the mill", giving it only 2 out of 5 stars. Writing for my paper was Boon Chan, who gave the film a rating of 2.5. He wrote that "their [Lee and Singh's] much-vaunted chemistry has been overhyped."

== Awards and nominations ==
Taxi! Taxi! was chosen as Singapore's first official entry for the 1st Asean International Film Festival and Awards (Abbreviation: AIFFA) 2013, to be held in Kuching, Sarawak, Malaysia, from March 28–30, 2013.
