= List of The Noose episodes =

The Noose is a Singapore comedy TV series produced by MediaCorp Channel 5. The Noose is a parody of Singaporean news programmes with fictional news reports and a presentation mimicking that of the actual news bulletin.

A total of 101 episodes were broadcast over six seasons, with the season 6 finale airing on October 30, 2016.

== Series overview ==
Season	Episodes	Originally released	
Season	Episodes	First released	Last released
1	10	November 4, 2007	January 13, 2008
2	7	September 9, 2008	October 21, 2008
3	10	June 1, 2010	TBA
4	13	March 8, 2011	TBA
5	13	December 27, 2011	TBA
6	9	April 2, 2013	May 28, 2013
7	13	March 25, 2014	TBA
8	13	June 24, 2015	September 30, 2015
9	13	October 30, 2016	TBA

== Episodes ==
=== Season 1 (2007) ===
No. overall	No. in season	Title	Directed by	Written by	Original release date
1	1	TBA	Unknown	Unknown	4 November 2007
The episode begins with its top story on the Singaporean government's plan to spend 17 million per year over 5 years to ensure Singaporeans can access mental health services. A related story covers how Mediacorp, Singapore's national media network was pitching for a 5 million dollar fictitious drama titled "Sentimental". Andre Chichak, a reporter on-site at Mediacorp elaborated that Mediacorp was applying for 5 million dollars from the 17 million dollar annual mental health budget to fund the 138-episode English drama which was scheduled for filming in Pyeongyang. He mentions that Mediacorp landed a one million dollar deal with Rain, a Korean celebrity as the lead actor of the drama, jokingly quoting him by saying "It's sparkering" to mimic the actor's pronunciation of "It's sparkling" in a Korean tourism campaign. Following that, the Head of English Drama Productions in Mediacorp, Chan Mali Chan (also the name of a song gave a summary of the drama that was similar to the story of Kim Jong Un, mentioning that it was "set in North Korea" and was "about one man who has somehow managed to convince everybody... that the rest of the world does not exist". She shares that a Singaporean actor, Alex Man could not take part in the production as he was "compiling a scrapbook of teenage girls", which is likely a reference to the actor getting flak for taking photos of teenage girls and other offensive behaviour during the filming of Star Search 2007, a Singaporean talent show. The episode continues in the studio with the news anchors and a guest Doctor Waffles Boo, a renowned psychiatrist. He discusses the government's plans for an "International Monumental Hub" also known as "IMMental Hub", likely a play on the shopping centre IMM and IMH. He adds that the Merlion is going through psychiatric evaluation due to an identity crisis. Other stories include Singaporean doctors amputating a man from neck down for the first time, a reference to the first-ever hemicorporectomy done in Singapore and the 2007 GST increase.
2	2	TBA	Unknown	Unknown	11 November 2007
3	3	TBA	Unknown	Unknown	18 November 2007
4	4	TBA	TBA	TBA	TBA
5	5	TBA	TBA	TBA	TBA
6	6	TBA	TBA	TBA	TBA
7	7	TBA	TBA	TBA	TBA

=== Season 2 (2008) ===
No. overall	No. in season	Title	Directed by	Written by	Original release date
8	1	TBA	Unknown	Unknown	9 September 2008
We kick off the second season with a tongue-in-cheek look at the ongoing search for escaped terror suspect Mas Selamat Kastari. Also featured in this episode are stories on the unveiling of Singapore’s latest ministry, the Ministry without Portfolio.
9	2	TBA	Unknown	Unknown	16 September 2008
The show kicks off with a neighbourhood provision shop spat, with two shops promoting their own unique brand of cleaning detergents…actiongent and oppogent and how dvd pirates in Malaysia are also increasing prices to battle inflation. Other stories in this include the introduction of the Human ERP system also known as “Herpes” and a protest by employers of maids against a law that penalizes employers if their maids get pregnant.
10	3	TBA	Unknown	Unknown	23 September 2008
This episode kicks off with an examination of the ongoing brouhaha in Serangoon Gardens about converting a disused school compound into dormitories for foreign workers. Also in this ep, a story about what precautions motorists can take when driving up north to Malaysia.
11	4	TBA	Unknown	Unknown	30 September 2008
Petrol prices drop by two cents and motorists across the island make a mad dash to fill up their tanks. The Noose tries to get itself recognized as a legitimate news source by clamouring to be nominated in the annual Mediacorp News awards. The Singapore Bus company unveils a new breed of public buses. Adrianna Wow gives it a go as a beer lady at a neighbourhood coffeeshop. And Channel 5 launches a new hard hitting interview program called Hard to Talk.
12	5	TBA	Unknown	Unknown	7 October 2008
The Noose investigates the financial crisis which has hit Singapore with worried investors queuing up to cash in their insurance policies. Singapore has been voted as the world’s top complainers in a new study. Also, we take a look at one Singapore hotel is fighting the habit of Singaporeans stealing things during hotel stays. Another story is whether Singaporeans will ever learn to clear their trays when they eat at food courts or fast food outlets. And finally, Singapore’s table tennis sensation Rose Pok goes berserk during a match.
13	6	TBA	Unknown	Unknown	14 October 2008
We investigate training fatalities at the Basic Maid Training School. Also a look at the development plans for Pedra Branca and how some Singaporeans are finding creative ways to save in the face of increasing rice prices.
14	7	TBA	Unknown	Unknown	21 October 2008
We take a look at how Singaporeans have been using the protest space at Hong Lim Park. Also, we investigate the nature of university orientation games. There's also a feature on Singapore's most over-exposed television celebrity Quah Liao Xian.

=== Season 3 (2010) ===
No. overall	No. in season	Title	Directed by	Written by	Original release date
15	1	TBA	TBA	TBA	TBA
16	2	TBA	TBA	TBA	TBA
17	3	TBA	TBA	TBA	TBA
18	4	TBA	TBA	TBA	TBA
19	5	TBA	TBA	TBA	TBA
20	6	TBA	TBA	TBA	TBA
21	7	TBA	TBA	TBA	TBA
22	8	TBA	TBA	TBA	TBA
23	9	TBA	TBA	TBA	TBA
24	10	TBA	TBA	TBA	TBA

=== Season 4 (2011) ===
No. overall	No. in season	Title	Directed by	Written by	Original release date
25	1	TBA	TBA	TBA	TBA
26	2	TBA	TBA	TBA	TBA
27	3	TBA	TBA	TBA	TBA
28	4	TBA	TBA	TBA	TBA
29	5	TBA	TBA	TBA	TBA
30	6	TBA	TBA	TBA	TBA
31	7	TBA	TBA	TBA	TBA
32	8	TBA	TBA	TBA	TBA
33	9	TBA	TBA	TBA	TBA
34	10	TBA	TBA	TBA	TBA
35	11	TBA	TBA	TBA	TBA
36	12	TBA	TBA	TBA	TBA
37	13	TBA	TBA	TBA	TBA

=== Season 5 (2011-12) ===
No. overall	No. in season	Title	Directed by	Written by	Original release date
38	1	TBA	TBA	TBA	TBA
39	2	TBA	TBA	TBA	TBA
40	3	TBA	TBA	TBA	TBA
41	4	TBA	TBA	TBA	TBA
42	5	TBA	TBA	TBA	TBA
43	6	TBA	Unknown	Unknown	7 February 2011
44	7	TBA	Unknown	Unknown	14 February 2011
Laticia and Terry back together -Singaporeans help to bring Laticia Bongnino and Terry back together by helping settling their dispute over money. TMWP encourage singaporeans to reproduce - TMWP encourages married couples to have babies and tries to get people to get sold on romance by introducing the lost&found places for couples can go to get their "groove on". Closed door dining trending - As Singaporeans are dismayed by ambience in hawker centres and prices/service in posh restaurants, closed door dining trends as an alternative, amidst/even though questionable hygiene. Technological communications has replaced human conversations. - A wedding vows were conducted entirely through mobile phone communication and it ends as the bride and groom update their relationship status on Facebook and Twitter. An expecting mother deluded as her baby communicate with her through a Facebook account which she created. Laticia sings a filipino song.
45	8	TBA	TBA	TBA	TBA
46	9	TBA	TBA	TBA	TBA
47	10	TBA	TBA	TBA	TBA
48	11	TBA	TBA	TBA	TBA
49	12	TBA	TBA	TBA	TBA
50	13	TBA	TBA	Prem Anand (Head); JT Koh, Guntmar Kerbl (Contributing)	TBA
Social Policing of telling off Litterbug - Xiao Zheng tells off a young gangster for littering and was threatened in return. He was saved from harm when the bus that the gangster was waiting came. Giving up the Cellphone - Stieth Ong gave up using the mobile phone to avoid being reachable by anyone (family, friends, colleagues and debt collectors). Micky Dees Restaurant Curry Sauce Shortage - Micky Dees Restaurant ran out of curry sauce; customers are furious and unwilling to dip deep-fried nuggets into Sichuan sauce and Charsiew sauce. Values based education in school - Implemenging character building approaches for sports co-ciriculumm activities (CCA) is now part of the trend towards values based education.

=== Season 6 (2013) ===
No. overall	No. in season	Title	Directed by	Written by	Original release date
51	1	TBA	TBA	TBA	TBA
52	2	TBA	TBA	TBA	TBA
53	3	TBA	TBA	TBA	TBA
54	4	TBA	TBA	TBA	TBA
55	5	TBA	TBA	TBA	TBA
56	6	TBA	TBA	TBA	TBA
57	7	TBA	TBA	TBA	TBA
58	8	TBA	TBA	TBA	TBA
59	9	TBA	TBA	TBA	TBA
