= List of Point of Entry episodes =

This is a list of episodes for the MediaCorp Channel 5 television series Point of Entry.

== Season 1 ==
No. in season	Title	Original release date
1	"Pilot"	9 December 2010
Team Epsilon's commanding officer Edmund Seng has been murdered by a sniper during a raid on the hideout of a syndicate called "Angel". While the team is still in shock and grief, they are introduced to their new leader Glenn Chua. His cold and aloof demeanour does not endear him to the rest of the team. Meanwhile, a pair of Burmese illegal immigrants are discovered in a car at Woodlands, one of them having asphyxiated in the boot. The team suspects the driver is merely a pawn in a much larger operation.
2	"Arms Race"	16 December 2010
Glenn's friend Jackson witnesses the stabbing of a secondary school student at a bus stop using a knife that has been illegally imported. Left with little hard evidence other than eyewitness accounts and hearsay, the only way to get information is for rookie Dynesh to go undercover into the gang involved.
3	"Natural Selection"	23 December 2010
Two Indian men discover a box of rare snakes, which are identified as illegal by the AVA. Some of the evidence points to the "Angel" syndicate and Cheong hypotheses that they have diversified. The suspect is successful businessman and philanthropist Patrick Lau, who has an equally big ego to match. Glenn and Vivian go undercover to one of Patrick's parties posing as a couple interested in buying exotic pets but their plans quickly go down the drain.
4	"Family Ties"	30 December 2010
The Coast Guard intercepts a boat smuggling illegal immigrants but all four occupants bail before they are caught. One of the immigrants is found dead while the middleman Chow has gone missing. The team discover that the "Angel" syndicate is once again behind this and must find Chow before "Angel" gets to him.
5	"Adult Toy Story"	6 January 2011
Norah's aunt has found a new boyfriend Victor, a charming and polite businessman. Cheong and Norah grow suspicious when a bag of pills is found in Victor's bag.
6	"Truth and Consequences"	13 January 2011
The team is called to investigate a curious case of marriage scams in which a mentally handicapped man's name is used to forge marriage documents to allow young foreign women to obtain visas and work in Singapore. Unfortunately for Cheong and Dynesh, finding these women proves to be much harder than anticipated.
7	"On Angel's Wings"	20 January 2011
A social worker is found dead in a spa which has employed illegal immigrant young women. Glenn and his team suspect "Angel" has struck again when one of the girls admits to seeing the main henchman Joe at the scene of the crime. The spa owner knows little of the operations and Joe refuses to talk, leaving the team with little to work with. Just when everything starts to click, "Angel" hires a lawyer to bail Joe out and Joe is found dead in the prison stairwell.
8	"Child's Play"	27 January 2011
Three Sri Lankan children are found unaccompanied at Changi Airport and CCTV footage shows that another woman and boy had been with them. When the woman is later found dead with the three children's forged passports, the team suspect there is more to this case than meets the eye.
9	"Nightswimming"	3 February 2011
Drug overdose is on the rise again, this time among the yuppie population, leading the team to conclude that "Angel" seems to have "branched" into drug dealing as well. Glenn, Cheong and Dynesh stake out on a boat in the middle of the night and discover some suspicious characters using rather unconventional ways to get the drugs past the immigration checkpoint.
10	"My Sister's Keeper"	10 February 2011
Even older folks are not spared by smuggling syndicates as four middle-aged women go missing while on a shopping trip to Malaysia and one of them is a family friend of Cheong. Meanwhile, Edmund's Thai fiancée Noi is determined to find out who murdered him.
11	"Web of Lies"	17 February 2011
What started as a routine investigation becomes a messy web of lies and betrayal.
12	"A Crisis of Credit"	24 February 2011
Team Epsilon is called to investigate a spate of credit card fraud cases. In a cruel twist of fate, Noi learns that Edmund was killed by her own brother Ricky, who is revealed to be one of the main men behind the "Angel" syndicate, with help from Jackson, his younger brother.
13	"On the Smoking Trail"	3 March 2011
The team are on the hunt for the runners after a big cigarette bust. Vivian suspects her brother is in the wrong company and tries to help him before its too late.
14	"Mind the Gap"	10 March 2011
Another drug overdose case leads the team to suspect "Angel" is back. The deceased had some 400 times more than usual overdose cases and the team must stop this "new initiative" before more victims end up in the coroner's table.
15	"The Gathering Storm"	17 March 2011
A dead body is found in Little India, leading the team to perhaps their biggest smuggling case thus far. Glenn's vacation in Thailand quickly becomes an investigation while his team back home must make do without him.
16	"Friend or Enemy"	24 March 2011
Two bodies are found on a barge, suspected to be victims of "Angel"'s smuggling operation. Glenn has learned that "Angel" is actually Jackson's "family business". He starts becoming disillusioned in his job with the ICA and finds himself at crossroads.
17	"Sins of the Father"	31 March 2011
The real story behind the "Angel" criminal syndicate is revealed. Back home, Team Epsilon uncover a plot to murder an innocent woman and her family.
18	"Binary"	7 April 2011
Tuas Checkpoint's Protective and Analytic Facility is alerted to a chemical spill and discover that the mastermind is an illegal immigrant who also happens to be a terrorist! Team Epsilon makes a shocking discovery when the trail leads to their own leader Glenn. Has he been bribed...or has he been framed?
19	"False Faces"	14 April 2011
"Angel" has discovered a new way to dodge immigration with the forgery of biometric passports. Glenn must make a crucial decision: to betray his own team or his best friend Jackson?
20	"Endgame"	21 April 2011
Jackson is on the brink of becoming the new boss of "Angel". Will Glenn help him succeed or will he be the insider who causes Jackson's downfall? Will Team Epsilon be able to bring down the "Angel" syndicate once and for all?

== Season 2 ==
No. in season	Title	Original release date
1	"Karma"	8 December 2011
Team Epsilon is reunited and back at work. Vivian has been seconded to the US to attend a training course. Glenn has difficulty getting along with his new superior SUPT Wong. The team are called to investigate an unusual prostitution case involving Ly, a Vietnamese woman who lives separately from her unemployed Singaporean husband and a Thai nightclub waitress-cum-prostitute named Dao. Cheong and Dynesh follow Ly to a women's shelter and, to their shock, sees her talking with Noi, Ricky and Jackson's sister. Glenn goes undercover at a party to nab the boss of the nightclub and discovers that Dao is actually Kara Yeo, an undercover CID officer.
2	"Transplanted"	15 December 2011
Team Epsilon has some new members: Liu Ai Ling from CNB, Matthew Yong from uniformed checkpoints and Kara Yeo, the new police liaison officer. Dynesh's friendship with Matthew starts off on the wrong foot while it soon becomes apparent that Glenn and Kara's strong personalities do not go well together. A foreign national drops dead at Changi Airport immigration checkpoint and his medical report leads the team to the world of the illegal organ trade.
3	"Bloodline"	22 December 2011
A baby is found abandoned at a park. Witnesses identify an Indonesian maid at the scene earlier. Norah goes undercover as a maid at Lucky Plaza to find out more about the child and the maid, but not before enduring a "matchmaking session" set up by her well-meaning mother. Meanwhile, Noi is still coming to terms with her family's criminal connections and tries to distance herself from her past.
4	"Fast Girls"	29 December 2011
The severed head of a woman is found in some bushes and another severed head of a man with a "Glasgow smile" is found in a nearby rubbish bin. When the team finds out she was a student from China whose visa has expired and her younger sister is possibly in danger, Ai Ling is sent undercover to find out who the elusive pimp is.
5	"Runner"	5 January 2012
A pair of lovers enjoying themselves under the full moon get a nasty surprise when they find a corpse washed up along the beach. Team Epsilon is notified after police discover the man is a Taiwanese national on a social visit pass with some suspect dealings. However they hit a dead end when all they have is a cowardly ah long and two secondary school students who refuse to tell the truth.
6	"One Way Ticket"	12 January 2012
Two Filipino women are caught by immigration officers with fake return tickets from the same bogus travel agency. Things get fishy when a taxi driver identifies a suspicious cross-dressing Filipino-accented man as the person who booked him to pick one of the women.
7	"Child's Play"	19 January 2012
Glenn receives news that Noi and Jackson's father is terminally ill and heads off to Bangkok, knowing a power struggle will ensue in the "Angel" syndicate once he dies. Noi is forced to marry Samak, her father's successor as head of the syndicate. The team back home is handed a child smuggling case to solve.
8	"Chasing the Dragon (Part 1)"	26 January 2012
Matthew's day off is ruined when he finds the dead body of an Indian man while water skiing. Glenn and Ai Ling interview his childhood friend and find out that the deceased, Muthu, is one of many drug mules used by "Cobra" and his trafficking ring to smuggle drugs into the country. With little evidence to work with, Glenn has no choice but to send Dynesh undercover as "Muthu's younger brother" on a dangerous operation to infiltrate the ring.
9	"Chasing the Dragon (Part 2)"	2 February 2012
The team are worried about Dynesh when they discover just how cruel "Cobra" is. Dynesh's conscience becomes tormented as he is forced to commit crimes to prove his loyalty to "Cobra".
10	"The Devil Inside"	9 February 2012
An investigation into a cult-related suicide turns into an ICA matter when a suspicious Thai Buddhist monk is spotted at the flat and some incense laced with a form of marijuana and forged passports are found at the site. "Master Hong" confesses that he is but a middleman part of a "very powerful gang in Thailand". Dynesh has difficulty coping during rehabilitation. Noi becomes suspicious of her husband Samak when she learns one of his henchmen kidnapped and smuggled the daughters of their estate employees and tenants into Singapore and her father now doubts his decision to appoint Samak as his successor.
11	"Sex, Lies and CCTV"	16 February 2012
When Cheong is caught on camera with an illegal prostitute who was later found dead, Kara and the team have an uphill battle as they fight to clear his name. At the same time, Glenn and Ai Ling follow a Chinese couple whom they suspect of forging passports for their "friends". Noi uncovers a sinister secret her husband has been keeping of late.
12	"Prickly Heat"	23 February 2012
A madman armed with a syringe of HIV-positive blood is on the loose after robbing a couple of their money and passports. Their conflicting stories and the wife's fear arouses the suspicion of the team. Noi decides to accept Samak for her own sake.
13	"The Good Samaritans"	1 March 2012
14	"Pest Control"	8 March 2012
A case of illegal foreign workers working at a chain of hawker stalls has Team Epsilon stumped -- what does it have to do with a China national and a Singaporean? Noi discovers a leak in Angel syndicate, and takes ruthless measures to stop it. Will Cheong's sexual harassment case be resolved, or will it take a turn for the worse?
15	"The Gentle Giant"	15 March 2012
16	"Lineage"	22 March 2012
Team Epsilon discovers a Baby Smuggling Ring. Ai Ling and Matthew goes undercover to arrest the pimp. Also, Vivian and her Baby got Kidnapped by Noi.
17	"Trust"	29 March 2012
Team Epsilon must foil a terrorist plot to bomb Singapore and rescue Vivian's baby from Noi. Ai Ling faces a difficult person decision as well. Glenn got shot, surprisingly by Jackson.

== Season 3 ==
No. in season	Title	Original release date
1	"Reunion"	29 November 2012
A year has passed since the final showdown between Jackson and Glenn. Team Epsilon has been disbanded and the members try to move on with their lives. However, duty calls and they have another prostitution syndicate to crack.
2	"Sweet Slumber"	6 December 2012
Team Epsilon has a newbie Melissa joining them. A foreign national whose visa expired is found dead under suspicious circumstances. The team try to figure the identity of "Virote", who is possibly head of a new criminal syndicate.
3	"Bagged"	13 December 2012
The dismembered body of a runaway maid is found in a mysterious bag left at an MRT station.
4	"The Old and the Restless"	20 December 2012
A man is found dead from an overdose of illegally imported sex drugs. Cheong finds himself face-to-face with an old nemesis.
5	"Beach Boy"	27 December 2012
There has been a string of passport thefts but the latest victim has been lying to the authorities. Cheong is dealing with the aftermath of his wife's assault, reassessing his priorities while Dynesh is hopeful of advancement at work.
6	"Cemented Soul"	3 January 2013
In the process of renovating a house, a corpse, a suspected illegal immigrant is uncovered. While Team Epsilon attempts to pinpoint the murderer, Cheong tries his best to be a family man and make up for lost time, and Norah faces familial objections to her job.
7	"Tourist Trap"	10 January 2013
Team Epsilon investigates a culprit who drugs foreign women he met from online forums. Virote saves Miguel from the police, but it turns out that he betrayed Miguel.
8	"The Night Terrors"	17 January 2013
Matthew faces a lawsuit from the victim's family of the previous case. Team Epsilon investigates slashing cases with a kris
9	"Switching Partners"	24 January 2013
When all signs point to an illegal immigrant being the killer of a woman whose husband is missing, Team Epsilon learns that identifying a body is not as difficult as identifying an allegiance. Kara discovers a problem at home that she may not be able to fix.
10	"Grudge Match"	31 January 2013
In their latest case, Team Epsilon traces a severely maimed over-stayer to an illegal fight club run by foreigners. Will their brains be able to defeat the brawn? And will Glenn finally discover what Virote has been up to?
11	"Shop for Free"	7 February 2013
A long-running gang of Vietnamese shoplifters has caught the attention of Team Epsilon. But soon, petty theft isn't enough for them anymore, and the crimes begin to escalate and lives are at risk. Kara's personal problems escalate as well and she's starting to realise that she's out of her depth.
12	"Social Network"	14 February 2013
Mel helps a neighbour out and discovers that what appears to be a simple case of suicide quickly becomes something sinister, after an inspection of the victim's Internet history. Glenn also makes a false step in his investigation of Virote, which leads to tragic consequences.
13	"The Riot Act"	21 February 2013
The hunt for a man who prints illegal work permits takes Dynesh, Matthew and Mel to a petro-chemical factory in Batam. Unfortunately, their timing couldn't be worse, as the workers are planning a dangerous revolt.
14	"My Bloody Valentine"	28 February 2013
15	"Flower Power"	7 March 2013
ICA officers uncover an alcohol smuggler at the checkpoint.
16	"Party on Thin Ice"	14 March 2013
17	"Cold Betrayal"	21 March 2013
18	"Ties That Bind"	28 March 2013

== Season 4 ==
No. in season	Title	Original release date
1	"Escape"	26 December 2013
Glenn is arrested in the Philippines on suspicion of murder. Cheong is assigned to take charge of Team Epsilon and the team welcomes ASP Sophie Thomas as they investigate a nightclub with illegal immigrants as hostesses. DSP Victor de Cruz (Desmond Tan) returns to join CID Intel after his overseas studies and has a special interest in Glenn’s case. Glenn turns fugitive when he escapes from the police, but the police and Miguel’s men close in on him, Glenn is left with little choice but to seek refuge with a dangerous ally.
2	"Revelations"	2 January 2014
Glenn has joined the Multo syndicate in the Philippines and he is tasked to oversee a smuggling operation into Singapore. Norah has given birth to a daughter, Yasmine, and is on maternity leave. Team Epsilon probes into a family suspected of harbouring illegal immigrants and uncovers a dark secret as they go after an overstayer who is selling illegal cigarettes.
3	"Packed Up To Go"	9 January 2014
The team investigates the mysterious circumstances surrounding an over stayer student's disappearance. Analyn played by Bela Ocampo arrives in Singapore to further her studies, and turns to Glenn for help when she's cheated of her money by an agent.
4	"Runaway"	16 January 2014
Amidst questions about Cheong and Dynesh's encounter with Glenn, Team Epsilon investigates the sudden disappearance of a domestic helper who steals her employers passport. Anton decides to put Glenn's loyalty to the test. Matthew challenges Dynesh to be honest with himself and his feelings towards Sophie and Cheong's life is turned upside down by the arrival of an unexpected visitor.
5	"A Midsummer Night's Dream"	23 January 2014
When female drug mules are caught at the checkpoints smuggling heroin in sanitary pads, Team Epsilon goes undercover to nab a syndicate thats dealing drugs at a Full Moon party. Glenn learns how Anton takes instructions from his higher-ups and Cheong is in a dilemma about his past and worries about how it would affect his family.
6	"No Smoke Without A fire"	30 January 2014
The team investigates the source of an illegal shipment of e-cigarettes. Victor continues his relentless pursuit of Glenn. With Calvin's help, Glenn sets up a meeting between Multo and a local drug distributor to sniff out the leader of Multo. But things don't always go according to plan.
7	"In My Scheme of Things"	6 February 2014
A sociopathic teen bully hires a man to rape a girl. Team Epsilon goes on the trail of a suspected illegal immigrant but something doesn't match up. Meanwhile, Glenn tries to uncover more info on Multo but things take a drastic turn as Anton comes to a realization about Glenn and decides to eliminate him.
8	"One Of Us"	13 February 2014
The team investigates the case of a tampered passport as it burgeons into maid abuse and manslaughter. Victor from CID pursues Glenn as a prime suspect for murder, but Glenn refuses to surrender, he is set on vengeance against Anton. Kara and Team Epsilon try to clear Glenn's name.
9	"For Better Or Worse"	20 February 2014
A recent increase in fraudulent marriages spurs the team to action. Glenn is back as the head of Team Epsilon, but concerns about Multo continue to occupy his thoughts. In the Philippines, Multo plans their next move. The team investigates a potentially fraudulent marriage, and the trail leads to a shocking revelation that personally affects members of the Team.
10	"Doctor No"	27 February 2014
The discovery of an illegal immigrant with a missing kidney sparks off an investigation into an organ-stealing syndicate. Matthew faces family pressures and has doubts about staying in ICA. Glenn and Kara are at a crossroads in their relationship and it looks to be taking a positive turn… or not.
11	"BFF"	6 March 2014
The team's investigation of a missing foreign worker leads to a grisly find at Bedok Reservoir. Tensions between Glenn and Kara continue to rise over his inability to express his true feelings. Norah rejoins the team after a long absence. Glenn finally confirms a worrying suspicion he's had all along.
12	"Dial-a-Con"	13 March 2014
Team Epsilon goes undercover to flush out a scheme involving impersonating ICA officers to extort money from tourists. A new highly-addictive drug surfaces in Singapore. Meanwhile, Glenn takes steps to keep track of his target - the Leader of Multo.
13	"Yelo Fever"	20 March 2014
The team is alerted when an overstayer attempts to leave the country using someone else’s passport, but the trail leads them to a disturbing discovery. Kara's father is hospitalised for a heart operation, and Glenn tries to be supportive which rouses Analyn’s jealousy. Multo looks to make a big move into Singapore, will they be able to slip past the authorities unnoticed?
14	"The Women Scorned"	27 March 2014
In the season finale of Point of Entry, things begin to heat up as Multo’s plans unfold in Singapore but Team Epsilon is equally determined to eliminate the new drug Yelo from our streets. Meanwhile, Glenn is getting ready to fly to the Philippines to take down Multo’s leader and maybe even exchange vows at his own wedding?!
