= Confinement (2023 film) =

2023 Singaporean film

- Theatrical release poster
- Chinese: 陪月
- Hanyu Pinyin: Péi yuè
- Directed by: Kelvin Tong
- Written by: Kelvin Tong
- Produced by: Kat Goh; Leon Tong; Winnie Teo
- Starring: Rebecca Lim; Cynthia Koh
- Cinematography: Lim Teck Siang
- Edited by: Tammy Quah
- Music by: Joe Ng
- Production companies: Clover Films; Boku Films
- Distributed by: Golden Village Pictures
- Release date: 19 October 2023
- Running time: 95 minutes
- Country: Singapore
- Languages: Mandarin; Hokkien
- Budget: S$1.5 million

Confinement (Chinese: 陪月) is a 2023 Singaporean psychological thriller film written and directed by Kelvin Tong. It stars Rebecca Lim and Cynthia Koh. The plot follows a first-time mother (Lim) who starts experiencing strange occurrences in her house when she hires a confinement nanny (Koh) to look after her and her newborn baby for a month. The film was released in theatres on 19 October 2023.

== Synopsis ==
A pregnant painter moves into a temporary lodging and begins experiencing inexplicable incidents in the house when a confinement nanny is hired to take care of her and her newborn child.

== Cast ==
- Rebecca Lim as Wang Siling
  - Lynette Choo as young Siling
- Cynthia Koh as Ah Qing
- Jordan Voon as Professor Pan
- Chai Zi as Mr Yan
- Jae Liew as Mrs Yan
- Daren Tan as Ben
- Keith Lee as Weijie
- Wong Zi Rui as Minmin
- Chin Hsin Yao as toddler Minmin
- Chloyen Lim as Ah Mei
- Chow Wei as Tingting
- Albert Lau as Psychologist
- Liew May Lee as Confinement nanny
- Jimmy as Xiaohei the black dog

== Production ==
The film's budget was reported to be S$1.2–1.5 million. Filming took place in a mansion in Kuala Lumpur for 24 days and concluded in early March 2023.

Confinement is one of the four films Singapore production company Clover Films is working on with Chinese streaming platform iQiyi, with the support of the Singapore Film Commission
