= Disdain (EP) =

Bù Xiè
- Disdain cover

EP 不屑 by Alien Huang
- Released: 17 July 2009
- Genre: Mandopop, rock
- Language: Mandarin
- Label: Rock Records

Alien Huang chronology
Bù Xiè (2009)	Love Hero (2009)

Bù Xiè (Chinese: 不屑 "Disdain") is Taiwanese Mandopop artist Alien Huang's (aka Xiao Gui 小鬼) Mandarin solo debut EP album. It was released on 17 July 2009 by Rock Records. A second edition, Disdain (Limited Edition) (不屑 限量版) on 16 September 2009 with a bonus DVD containing two music videos and behind-the-scene footage.

In this EP Alien collaborated with label mates, rock band Fun4 (小樂團). The tracks "鬼混" (Fooling Around) was previously released in 2008 as a promotional single with Alien's second illustration book "鬼怒穿", and together with "鬼打牆" (Demon Walls) are rock tracks. The title track "不屑" (Disdain) is a rock ballad.

== Track listing ==
1. "Intro"
2. "鬼打牆" (Demon Walls)
3. "不屑" (Disdain)
4. "鬼混" (Fooling Around)
5. "Outro"

== Bonus DVD ==
1. "鬼打牆" (Demon Walls) MV
2. "不屑" (Disdain) MV
3. Exclusive Xiao Gui behind-the-scene footage (獨家側拍鬼靈精怪全紀錄)
