= Alien Huang =

Taiwanese singer (1983–2020)

- 黃鴻升
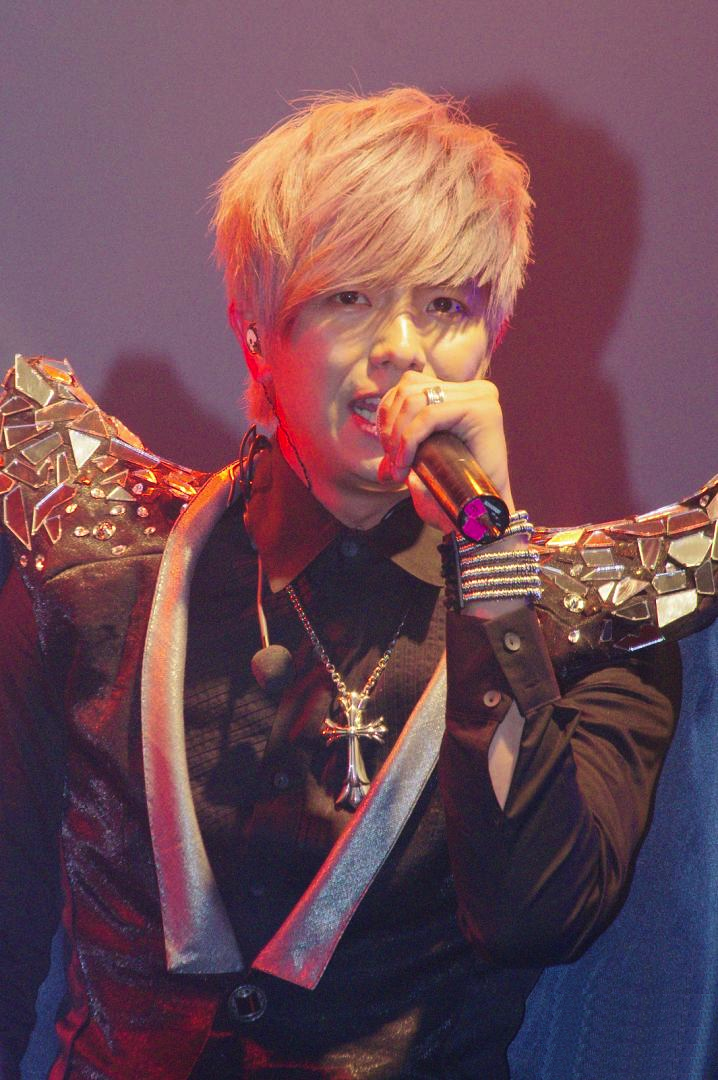
- Huang performing at the Night King concert at Taipei Station on 28 November 2012
- Born: 28 November 1983; Beitou District, Taipei, Taiwan
- Died: 16 September 2020 (aged 36); Beitou District, Taipei, Taiwan
- Education: Taipei City University of Science and Technology
- Occupations: Singer; actor; television host; lyricist; writer; illustrator; fashion designer; artist; businessman
- Years active: 2002–2020
- Musical career
- Also known as: Xiao Gui; Little Ghost
- Genres: Mandopop; rock
- Instrument: Vocals
- Label: Rock Records
- Formerly of: HC3; Cosmo; Playboyz

Chinese name
- Traditional Chinese: 黃鴻升
- Simplified Chinese: 黄鸿升
- Hanyu Pinyin: Huáng Hóng Shēng
- Jyutping: Wong4 Hung4 Sing1
- Hokkien POJ: N̂g Hông-seng

Alien Huang (28 November 1983 – 16 September 2020), also known as Xiao Gui (Little Ghost), was a Taiwanese singer, actor, television presenter, illustrator and fashion designer.

He was a member of Japanese TV Asahi's disbanded boy band HC3 in 2002 and Taiwanese Rock Records' disbanded boy band Cosmo (丸子) in 2003. He went on to release five solo albums and acted in movies and television dramas. He was known as the host of popular Taiwanese variety entertainment show 100% Entertainment, which he left in early 2016.

Huang was the founder and designer of AES (Alien Evolution Studio), a clothing brand which he established in 2008. He also published three illustration books.

== Early life ==
Alien Huang was born in Taipei. He grew up living with his father, younger sister and paternal grandmother. Although he lived separately from his mother due to his parents' early divorce, they still maintained a close relationship. Ever since primary school, his talent in arts and crafts had been evident as his grades were always within the top three ranks in poster-designing projects. When he was in middle school, his father intended to train him to become a professional golf player. However, due to his interest in performing, he decided to apply to HuaGang High School of Performing Arts, where he was accepted after achieving first place out of thousands of applicants. There, he met classmate Rainie Yang, and they dated for three years. Their relationship ended when Rainie made her debut in the entertainment industry and dropped out of high school. He also put his hosting talents to use by serving as the MC of all major events held at school. In his spare time, he even worked in a fast-food restaurant. He obtained a lifeguard licence at the age of 18, and a swimming coach qualification when he was 20 years of age.

Huang chose his English name "Alien" because he hoped to be an indefinable and unique character, like aliens are, full of creativity and not confined to normality. He previously also had various other English names, including "Janson" when he was in high school and "Harry" when he was in primary school.

== Career ==
In high school, Huang was chosen to take part in a pre-casting training course for the film Blue Gate Crossing. While he did not participate in the film, it was during this time that he was discovered by his first manager, and had officially entered the entertainment industry at the age of 18.

In 2002, he began hosting a nature-discovery show for children named Follow Me, Go!. He then joined the Japanese-Taiwanese boy band HC3. They released their debut single "We Are Friends"《我們是朋友》, but disbanded not long afterwards.

In 2003, he became part of the boy band Cosmo, but due to a problem with the contract of one of the members, Richard（綠茶）, they disbanded after releasing their debut album《關東煮》.

In 2004, he played one of the main roles in the film Holiday Dreaming《夢遊夏威夷》.

In 2005, he started hosting various entertainment shows, and in 2006 he officially became a fixed host of the show 100% Entertainment《娛樂百分百》.

In 2007, he released a duet, "The Melody of Love"《愛的主旋律》, with co-artist Genie Chuo. He also released his first book《搞什麼鬼?!》the same year.

In 2008, he starred in the drama series Mysterious Incredible Terminator《霹靂MIT》 as one of the main roles, 747黃輝宏. He also released his first single "Fooling Around"《鬼混》 along with his second book《鬼怒穿》that year.

In July 2009, he released his first mini album Disdain《不屑》 and in December of the same year he released his first full album titled Love & Hero《愛&英雄》.

In 2010, he released another single, "Heart Amulet"《御守之心》, along with his third book,《赤鬼流》.

In 2011, he took on leading roles in the drama series Love You《醉後決定愛上你》 and "Lin Bei"《珍愛林北》, as well as the Singaporean film Already Famous《一泡而紅》. In August, he released the single "Transformers Cuz of You"《金剛變形》. In December, he released his second full album Break Heart, Black Heart《黑心傷品》.

In 2012, he starred in Taiwanese film Din Tao: Leader of the Parade《陣頭》, which earned a box office of NTD 315 million, as well as the highly rated Singaporean drama series Joys of Life. He also starred as the lead role in the Taiwanese television drama Sweet Sweet Bodyguard《剩女保鏢》, which gained high local popularity. His debut Asia concert tour G·host Tour 2012 also took place towards the end of the year, starting in Taiwan on his birthday (28 November) and continuing to Hong Kong and Singapore.

In 2013, he released his third full album, Make Sense《超有感》. He also held concerts in Taipei and Shanghai in the latter part of the year. He won “Most Popular Male Artiste” at the 2013 Singapore Hit Awards, as well as “MeRadio Top Downloaded Hit Award (Male Artist), for which the winning female artist for the same award was Singapore singer songwriter Serene Koong (龚芝怡). He also won two awards at the 2014 HITO Radio Music Awards, namely "hito网路首播人气” and “hito舞台演绎”.

In 2016, as his focus in the entertainment industry shifted to musical and acting careers, Alien left 100% Entertainment, the only show he was hosting at the time.

In 2018, he returned to hosting when joined Jacky Wu as hosts of Mr. Player. In 2019, he joined Shiny Zhang as hosts for I'm the Best In Taiwanese, an educational program about teaching Taiwanese to the public. At the time of his death, the show finished airing its second season, totaling 26 episodes.

== Death ==
At 11:27 a.m. on 16 September 2020, the police received a call from Huang's father, who reported that Huang was unresponsive. Huang was discovered lying between the bedroom and bathroom in his Beitou District apartment, with external injuries to the head. The paramedics who arrived at the scene pronounced Huang dead, with the body reported to already be at the stage of rigor mortis. The preliminary results of an autopsy suggested that Huang had cardiovascular disease. The autopsy concluded that Huang died of aortic dissection, but found no history of cardiovascular disease and no external injuries.

== Personal life ==
Huang dated Rainie Yang, the daughter of his godmother, for two years while they were both students at Taipei Hwa Kang Arts School, although he clarified that they were not each other's first loves. Their relationship ended after Yang entered the entertainment industry and dropped out of the school, but they remained close friends thereafter.

In 2016, Huang was reported to be in a relationship with NueNue, a member of the girl group Weather Girls, who was spotted staying overnight at his home. Huang admitted that she was "the type I like" and briefly updated his Facebook relationship status to "in a relationship." The relationship came to an end after three years in 2019.

At the time of his death, Huang had been dating Wu Han-chun, a member of the cheerleading team The Passion Sisters, for a year and a half. Their relationship had been rumored, but was not confirmed until Wu made an Instagram post acknowledging Huang's death.

== Discography ==
=== Solo studio albums and singles ===
Release year	English title	Chinese title	Format
2008	Fooling Around	《鬼混》	Single
2009	Disdain	《不屑》	Mini album
2009	Love & Hero	《愛&英雄》	Album
2010	Heart Amulet	《御守之心》	Single
2011	Transformers Cuz of You	《金剛變形》	Single
2011	Break Heart, Black Heart	《黑心傷品》	Album
2012	Forgot How To Be Happy	《忘了怎麼快樂》	Single
2013	Make Sense	《超有感》	Album
2014	Dare to believe, dare to do, dare to love	《自以為我以為》	Single
2014	Love Song	《有感情歌》	Single
2015	Forget Me	《忘了我》	Single
2015	Napoléon	《拿破崙》	Single
2015	ALiEN	《同名音創作品》	Album
2018	HUMAN	《人類》	Album
2020	Plan B	《Plan B》	Album

=== Studio albums and singles (band) ===
Name of band	English title	Chinese title	Release year	Format
HC3	We Are Friends	《我們是朋友》	2002	Single
Cosmo	Kanto Stew	《關東煮》	2003	Album
Speedball	Fastball Boys	《直球對決男子漢》	2004	Album
Playboyz	Happy New Year – It's All Good	《Happy New Year 這個讚》	2010	Compilation

=== Collaborations ===
Release year	English title	Chinese title	Co-artist(s)
2003	"You Better Remember"	《你給我記住》	Junior Han; Richard Rim; Jin-Xiu Duet; BiBi Zhao; Josephine Anan Xu; Pei-Lin Cai
2004	"Resurrection Island"	《復活島》	Alex To; Junior Han; Richard Rim
2007	"The Melody of Love"	《愛的主旋律》	Genie Chuo
2007	"Angel's Wings"	《天使的翅膀》	Various Artists
2008	"Fly Together"	《一起飛》	Various Artists
2009	"Let Love Spin the Entire Universe"	《讓愛轉動整個宇宙》	Various Artists
2010	"Tomorrow Will be Better"	《明天會更好》	Various Artists
2012	"Solicitude"	《牽掛》	Rui En
2013	"Beloved"	《心愛的》	Genie Chuo
2020	"Carry On"	《扛得住》	Alan Kuo; Bobby Dou

=== Soundtrack appearances ===
Year	English title	Chinese title	OST
2004	"Shining" (Cosmo)	「Shining」 （丸子）	Love Contract
2004	"Perfect Ending" (Cosmo)	「Perfect的完結」 （丸子）	Herb Lovers
2004	"Come Go to Hawaii"; Speed Force (Cosmo)	「來去夏威夷」 「上流速力霸」 （丸子）	Holiday Dreaming
2010	"Clone"	「複製人」	Rogue Principal
2011	"Transformers Cuz of You"	「金剛變形」	Lin Bei
2011	"Thank You for Letting Me Equal You"	「謝謝你讓我等於你」	Already Famous
2012	"Solicitude" (with Rui En)	「牽掛」 （與瑞恩合唱）	Joys of Life
2012	"Forgot How to Be Happy"	「忘了怎麼快樂」	Sweet Sweet Bodyguard
2012	"One Four One Three"	「一四一三」	Dong-Huachun Barbershop
2013年	"One out of A Thousand"	「千分之一」	Just You
2013年	"The Cat from the Farm"	「村上的貓」	Just You
2013年	"Beloved" (with Genie Chuo)	「心愛的」 （與卓文萱合唱）	Just You

== Filmography ==
=== Television series ===
Year	Title	Role	Notes
2002	Freedom of Half Grown-Ups 《半成年主張之搞個自由式》	Xiao Gui 小鬼	
2005	KO One 《終極一班》	Cai Yi-Ling 蔡一零	Cameo
2005	Detective Story A.S.T. 《偵探物語》	Ah-Jun 阿君	Cameo
2006	Tokyo Juliet 《東方茱麗葉》	Lu Yi-Mi 陸一彌	
2006	A Child from Heaven 《天堂來的孩子》	Zhong Da-Gui 鍾大規	
2006	Hey! Is the Water Boiled? 《喂！水開了沒?》	Ah-Zhong 阿忠	
2007	Corner With Love 《轉角*遇到愛》	Ah-Yi 阿義	
2007	Summer x Summer 《熱情仲夏》	Chen Lang-Zhu 陳朗竹	
2008	Mysterious Incredible Terminator 《霹靂MIT》	Huang Hui-Hong 黃輝宏 (747)	Taiwan
2009	Letter 1949 《我在1949，等你》	Li Wen-Xiong 李文雄	
2010	Rogue Principal 《流氓校長》	Wang Tuo-Hai 王拓海	
2011	Love You 《醉後決定愛上你》	Geng Shuo-Huai 耿爍懷	
2011	Lin Bei 《珍愛林北》	Kong Yun-Qing 孔雲青	Taiwan
2012	Joys of Life 《花样人间》	Zhao Ming-Xing 赵明星	Singapore
2012	Sweet Sweet Bodyguard 《剩女保鏢》	He Zhong-Qi 何仲祈	Taiwan
2014	Lovestore at the Corner 《巷弄裡的那家書店》	Li Ze Xuan 李澤暄	Taiwan
2017	Running Man 《逃婚一百次》	Hsu Da-cai 许达才	Taiwan
2019	Without Her, Even Hero is Zero 《我是顧家男》	Brian	Cameo
2019	Someday Or One Day 《想見你》	Du Qi-min 杜齊閔	Cameo
2020	Dream Raider 《獵夢特工》	特勤隊長	HBO Asia Cameo

=== Film ===
Year	Title	Role	Notes
2002	Wild (狂放)	Lin Yi-jie	
2002	Holiday Dreaming (夢遊夏威夷)	Xiao Gui	
2006	A Flight to Yesterday (飛往昨天的CI006)	Li Zheng-fei	
2007	Burn! Motorbike (燃燒吧！機車)	Hu Di-ni	
2009	Black Tide (黑潮)	Xiao Gui	
2011	Already Famous	Christopher	Singaporean film
2012	Din Tao: Leader of the Parade	Ah-xian	
2015	Gatao	Ah-xiong	
2016	Go! Crazy Gangster (風雲高手)	Ren Laifeng	
2016	The Big Power (大顯神威)	Lin Keqiang	
2017	All Because of Love	Hong Disuo	Cameo
2017	Who is the Champion? (舞極限)	Zhang Yunhan	Malaysian film
2024	Fat Hope	Nathan	Singaporean film; posthumous release

=== Music video appearances ===
Acting in music videos of songs by other artists:

Year	English song title	Original song title	Artist
2002	Love Starts from Zero	「愛從零開始」	Stefanie Sun 孫燕姿
2003	To See You	「來看你」	Jeffrey Kung 孔令奇
2003	Tomorrow	「明天」	Faith Yang 楊乃文
2004	Never Back Down	「永不退縮」	Richie Jen 任賢齊
2006	Lately	「最近」	Sam Lee 李聖傑
2007	Trying Hard	「很用力」	Olivia Yan 閻韋伶
2007	The Melody of Love	「愛的主旋律」	Alien Huang & Genie Chuo 黃鴻升 & 卓文萱
2008	Fly Together	「一起飛」	Various Artists 群星
2009	Let Love Spin the Entire Universe	「讓愛轉動整個宇宙」	Various Artists 群星
2010	Tomorrow Will Be Better	「明天會更好」	Various Artists 群星
2010	Happy New Year – It's All Good	「Happy New Year 這個讚」	Playboyz
2012	Solicitude	「牽掛」	Alien Huang & Rui En 黃鴻升 & 瑞恩
2013	Habitual Hibernation	「慣性冬眠」	Gillian Chung 鍾欣桐
2013	After Returning Home	「回家以後」	Gillian Chung 鍾欣桐

=== Show hosting ===
Year	English title	Original title	Location
2002	Follow Me, Go!	《下課花路米》	Taiwan
2004	Entertainment Oh My God	《娛樂歐MyGod》	Taiwan
2005	Survival Bus	《生存巴士》	Taiwan
2006	Cool Army	《蓋酷兵團》	Taiwan
2005 (as locum), 2006 (from official hosting)→ 2016	100% Entertainment	《娛樂百分百》	Taiwan
2008	Xiao Gui at Home Alone	《小鬼當家》	Taiwan
2009	The Winner Is	《得獎的事》	Taiwan
2011	China Love • Music Show	《中国爱•大歌会》	China
2014	CityColor	《zh:城彩名人堂》	Taiwan
2017		《趣你的娛樂》	Taiwan
2018	Mr. Player	《zh:綜藝玩很大》	Taiwan
2019	Best At Taiwanese	《台語我上讚》	Taiwan
2020		《聊聊大明星》	Taiwan

== Books ==
Year	English title	Chinese title	Category
2007	Too Fast to Live, Too Young to Die	《搞什麼鬼?!》	Illustration book
2008	Gui Nu Chuan	《鬼怒穿》	Illustration book
2010	Chi Gui Liu	《赤鬼流》	Illustration book

== Awards ==
- 2010 Singapore Entertainment Awards（新加坡E樂大賞2010）:
  Most Popular Regional Newcomer（E樂人氣海外新人獎）
- 2010 Channel V:
  Top 10 Chinese Golden Melodies（第一季華語十大金曲）：《搞砸了》
- 2010 Hong Kong Metro Radio Mandarin Hit Music Awards（香港新城國語力頒獎禮2010）：
  King of New Artistes（新人王）
- 2010 Singapore Hit Awards（新加坡金曲獎2010）:
  Most Acclaimed Male Artiste（新晉男歌手人氣獎）
  F&N Fruit Tree Fresh Greatest Improvement Artiste（大躍進歌手獎）
- 2011 Malaysia MY Astro Music Awards（馬來西亞 MY Astro 至尊流行榜頒獎典禮2011）:
  Best New International Artist（至尊海外新人獎）
  Golden Melody Song（至尊金曲獎）《地球上最浪漫的一首歌》
- 2011 Singapore Entertainment Awards（新加坡e樂大賞2011）:
  Most Popular Male Singer（e樂人氣男歌手獎）
  Hottest Web Celeb（omy 網絡紅人獎）
- 2011 China Music Radio Top Chart Awards（MusicRadio中國Top排行榜頒獎禮2011）：
  Most Recommended Album of the Year: Love & Hero（港臺年度推薦唱片）：《愛&英雄》
- 2012 Singapore Entertainment Awards（新加坡e樂大賞2012）:
  Most Popular Taiwanese TV Actor（e樂人氣台灣電視演員獎）
  Most Popular Male Singer（e樂人氣男歌手獎）
  Most Popular Music Video（e樂人氣MV獎）：《六十億分之一》
- 2012 Hong Kong Metro Radio Mandarin Hit Music Awards （香港新城國語力頒獎禮2012）：
  Best Male Singer（國語力男歌手）
  Best Mandarin Song（國語力歌曲）：《澀谷》
- 2012 Singapore Blog Awards（新加坡部落格大獎2012）：
  Most Popular Overseas Celebrity Blog/Microblog（最受歡迎海外名人部落格/微博）
- 2013 Taiwan PixNet Entertainment Awards（台灣痞客邦娛樂丸咖獎2013）：
  King of Entertainment – Silver Award（男藝人 最佳國丸 – 銀獎）
  Best Album of the Year – Silver Award（年度專輯 強力放送丸 – 銀獎）
- 2013 Singapore Entertainment Awards（新加坡e樂大賞2013）:
  Most Popular Taiwanese TV Actor（e樂人氣台灣電視演員獎）
  Most Popular Cover Celebrity（e樂人氣封面人物）
- 2013 Singapore Hit Awards（新加坡金曲獎2013）:
  Most Popular Male Artiste Award（最受欢迎男歌手獎）
  MeRadio Top Downloaded Hit Award (Male Artiste)（MeRadio下载率最高金曲（男歌手）:《超有感》）
  F&N Fruit Tree Fresh Stylish Artiste Award（F&N Fruit Tree Fresh 时尚歌手奖）
