= Devarajan Varadarajan =

Singaporean actor, singer and director

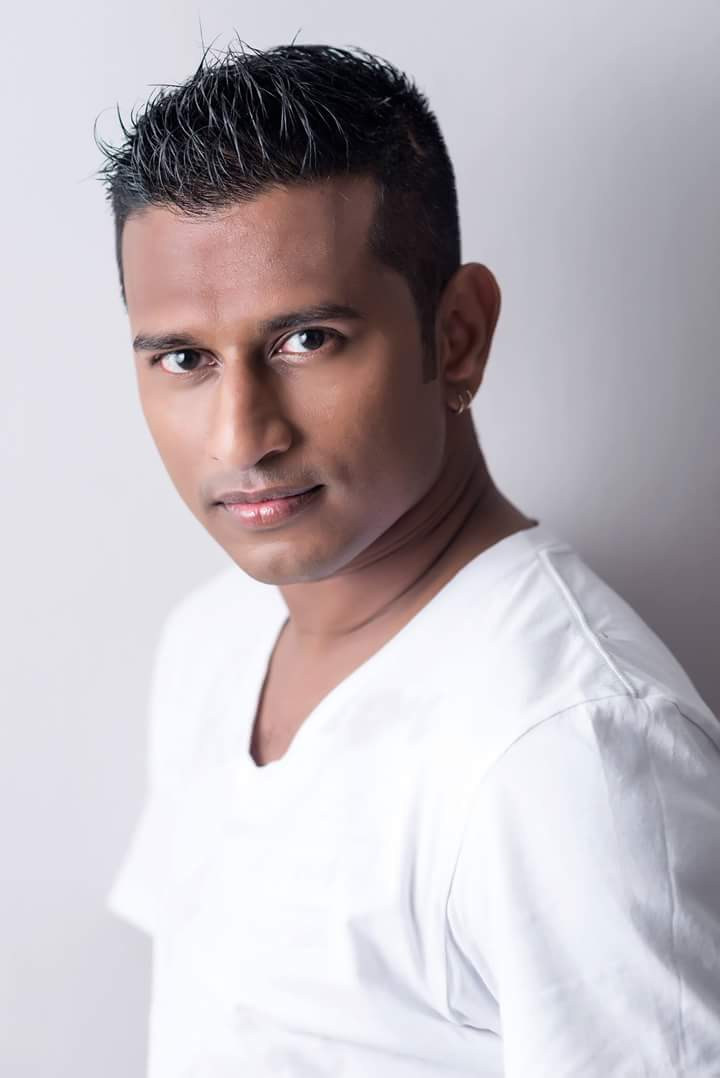
- Born: Devarajan Varadarajan; 23 May 1980 (age 44); Singapore
- Occupation(s): Actor, Singer, Director
- Years active: 2005–present

Devarajan Varadarajan (Dev) (born 23 May 1980) is a Singaporean actor, singer and director of Tamil descent.

== Career ==
In 2005, Devarajan took part in Vasantham Star, a Tamil language competition like American Idol He finished the competition among the top ten finalists that year. In 2007, Devarajan took part in Vasantham Star again, and finished the competition second runner up. Devarajan then went on to act, sing and present television programmes for Mediacorp Vasantham.

In 2010, Devarajan auditioned for the role of Dynesh in Mediacorp Channel 5's Point of Entry and landed the role. In 2012, Devarajan won the Best Supporting Actor at the Asian Television Awards for playing Dynesh in Point of Entry season 2. Devarajan is one of three characters retained for the entire run of the series.

In 2013, Devarajan started writing screenplays and directing. He wrote and directed his first few short films, "Emily", Soeurs and Time's Up. He also wrote and directed a two-hour Malay language film in 2015 titled Nur Ainun. It was telecast on Mediacorp Suria and was of their highest rated tele-films to date. Devarajan has also co-written a script titled "Broken and Entered" which is currently in pre production in the United States.

In 2024, Devarajan won "Best Performance in an Antagonist Role" at Pradhana Vizha 2024 for Naam season 2.

== Awards ==
- 2012 - Highly Commended Best Supporting Actor (Asian Television Awards)
- 2024 - Best Performance in an Antagonist Role (Pradhana Vizha 2024)
