= Chua Enlai =

Singaporean actor, comedian and host (born 1979)

- Born: 1979 (age 46–47); Singapore
- Occupations: Actor; comedian; host
- Years active: 1997−present

Chinese name
- Traditional Chinese: 蔡恩來
- Simplified Chinese: 蔡恩来
- Hanyu Pinyin: Cài Ēnlái
- Jyutping: Coi3 Jan1 Loi4
- Hokkien POJ: Chhòa Un-lâi

Chua Enlai (born 1979) is a Singaporean actor, comedian and host, best known for his work on the Mediacorp Channel 5 sitcom The Noose.

== Early life ==
Chua was born in Singapore in 1979 and raised in New Zealand. He lived in New Zealand for 12 years before moving back to Singapore.

== Career ==
Chua has worked on over 30 theatre productions with groups such as Wild Rice!, Toy Factory, Spell#7, SRT, TheatreWorks, The Necessary Stage and Action Theatre. On television, Chua is known for his roles as B.B.See (See Beh Biang) and Jacques Ooi in the Mediacorp Channel 5 sitcom The Noose. Chua has worked with Krishen Jit on several productions, including Squeeze & Squeezability, Plunge and The Visit of the Tai Tai.

In 2011, Chua starred as a platoon commander in The Ghosts Must Be Crazy, a two-part comedy horror film directed by Mark Lee and Boris Boo. Chua has also made a cameo as a police officer in the comedy movie Taxi! Taxi!, directed by Kelvin Sng and starring Gurmit Singh and Mark Lee.

Chua is also a member of the Association of Singapore Actors. In 2013, Chua expressed an interest in moving to more dramatic roles.

Chua is currently managed by FLY Entertainment and is currently the ambassador for HealthHub's campaign.

== Filmography ==
=== Film and television ===
Year	Title	Role	Notes	Ref.
2005–2007	My Sassy Neighbour	Yu Jin		
2007–2008	Parental Guidance	Al		
2007–2016	The Noose	Multiple characters	Prominently as B.B. See and Jacques Ooi	
2008–2009	Sayang Sayang	Dennis		
2011	Already Famous	Vaness		
2011	The Ghosts Must Be Crazy	LTA Chua, Officer Commanding		
2013	I'm in Charge	Matino		
2013	Say The Word	B.B. See		
2013	Everybody's Business	DD Chua	Special appearance	
2013	Taxi! Taxi!	Police officer		
2013	Say It	Himself		
2021	Kin	Shen Tian		
2023	Rookies' Kitchen	—N/a	As co-host	

== Theatre ==
Year	Title	Role	Notes	Ref
2002	Shopping & F***ing			
2004	Bent			
2007	Fundamentally Happy			
2016	Monkey Goes West 2016			
2017	The Noose and Kakis 2			
2017	Army Daze 2			
2018	Private Parts			
2013, 2020	The Importance of Being Earnest	Gwendolen Fairfax	2010 Life! Theatre Awards Best Supporting Actor	
2023	Snow White & the Seven Dwarfs	The Queen		

== Awards and nominations ==
Organisation	Year	Award	Nominated work	Result	Ref
Asian Television Awards	2010	Best Comedy Performance	The Noose	Won	
Asian Television Awards	2011	Best Comedy Performance	The Noose	Nominated	
Elle Awards	2008	Actor of the Year	—N/a	Won	
Life! Theatre Awards	2010	Best Supporting Actor	The Importance of Being Earnest	Won	
Star Awards	2016	Top 10 Most Popular Male Artistes	—N/a	Nominated	
Star Awards	2019	Top 10 Most Popular Male Artistes	—N/a	Nominated	
Star Awards	2022	Top 10 Most Popular Male Artistes	—N/a	Nominated	
Star Awards	2024	Top 10 Most Popular Male Artistes	—N/a	Nominated	
