= Paramita Bandara =

Singaporean educator and headmaster (1942–2013)

- Bandara in 1979

Principal of Ang Mo Kio Secondary School
- In office 1995–2000

Principal of Pasir Ris Secondary School
- In office 1985–1994

Principal of Tanjong Katong Girls' School
- In office 1977–1984

Personal details
- Born: Paramita Vathy Bandara; 1942 or 1943 Japanese-occupied Singapore
- Died: 7 February 2013 (aged 70) Singapore
- Education: University of Singapore

Paramita Vathy Bandara (1942 – 7 February 2013) was a Singaporean schoolteacher who served as the principal of three secondary schools over the course of her career. She was first the principal of Tanjong Katong Girls' School. She was then made the founding head of the Pasir Ris Secondary School, which developed a positive reputation under her leadership despite being a 'neighbourhood school', before being transferred to Ang Mo Kio Secondary School, where she moved to prevent its relocation from Ang Mo Kio to Hougang. On her death, Bryna Singh of The Straits Times proclaimed her one of the country's "best-known educationists".

== Early life and education ==
Bandara was born in Singapore to a Sinhalese father born in Sri Lanka and a Chinese mother from Sarawak. She was born shortly after the start of the Japanese occupation of Singapore; her mother received protection from the Japanese while en route to the Kandang Kerbau Hospital.

She had three brothers, the three oldest of her siblings, and seven sisters, all but one of whom would also grow up to become educators. One of her brothers was S. K. Bandara, a teacher at St Andrew's Junior College who became the school's principal at age 28. Her sisters included Nanda Bandara, who would also go on to become a prominent school headmaster, and Kal Bandara, who was also a linguist. The sisters by and large followed S. K. Bandara's footsteps and chose to become teachers, in part due to the limited opportunities afforded to women at the time.

Her father, R. K. Bandara, was a tailor whose business suffered during the Great Depression. Her mother was a housewife who did not receive a formal education. Despite being a devout Buddhist who insisted that his children remain Buddhist, R. K. Bandara sent his daughters to CHIJ Katong Convent as he was fond of the nuns and wanted his children to receive a basic education. He, however, explicitly told the children that they were not to convert to Catholicism, and sent them to attend weekend classes in Buddhism at the Sri Lankaramaya Buddhist Temple to counteract their classes in Catholicism. For several decades, the family lived in a stilted house on a large compound on Lorong Stangee in Katong with several amenities which offered the siblings ample opportunity to engage in physical activity. During the Japanese occupation, the air raid shelter beneath the house which her father had built was converted into a vegetable garden as part of the Grow More Food Campaign. It was serviced by a deep well on the estate and fed both the family and their neighbours, who gave in return other foodstuffs such as salt and rice. The family was "well looked after" by the Japanese during the occupation.

Bandara studied at the University of Singapore in the early 1960s for a Bachelor of Arts degree in economics and geography. This was funded with the help of her older siblings, who were unable to further their education due to the family's financial situation and instead entered the workforce.

== Career ==
Bandara began her career as a teacher at Raffles Girls' School in 1967, where she remained for six years. She claimed to have chosen this career path as she wanted to make an impact on others' lives. Bandara taught English and geography. A student of hers characterised her teaching style as "strict, no-nonsense" on the outside but also "loving and caring". In the same year, she was the only woman selected to be trained as a Cadet Officer in the National Cadet Corps (NCC). She was then put in charge of setting up the corps' girls' section. By July 1974, she was a Staff Officer in the NCC's Administration division, a position she held until 1976. She oversaw the work of around 18,500 cadets and 700 officers. She was conferred the Pingat Berkebolehan (Efficiency Medal) in 1977. She was also briefly transferred to Cedar Girls' Secondary School as Senior Assistant to the Principal in that year.

=== Tanjong Katong Girls' School ===
In March 1977, Bandara was appointed the headmaster of the Tanjong Katong Girls' School, which was well-reputed. She credited the speed of her promotion to her work with the National Cadet Corps. On assuming the position, she found the condition of the premises a major concern, and prioritised the renovation of the school compound in her first two years.

The school's teachers later recalled that she was approachable, competent, and efficient, and that she had done much for the school as a "motivating force". At the start of December 1984, after the next school year had already been planned out, Bandara was informed by the Ministry of Education (MOE) that she was to be transferred to the newly founded Pasir Ris Secondary School in January to serve as that school's founding principal. Pamela Mary Ashworth, a British teacher at Catholic Junior College, was approached by the ministry to succeed Bandara. This would have made her the first expatriate teacher to become a principal in the country. The ministry only considered expatriates for such posts in special cases, and it was believed that they had approached Ashworth for her experience. However, she turned down the offer for undisclosed reasons after making two visits to the school.

Having caught wind of Ashworth's rejection, the staff of Tanjong Katong Girls' School began to feel directionless. As a result, a petition which managed to garner 40 signatures from teaching staff and 84 from school staff in total was sent in mid-December to the MOE's Permanent Secretary, then Goh Kim Leong, urging the ministry to reconsider the transfer. The plan, hatched to "show their loyalty and support" for Bandara, was initially to garner around 50 signatures from teaching staff, though several had already left the country on holiday with the end of the school year and were thus uncontactable. The ministry confirmed by the end of the month that the decision would not be changed. Huang Chai Lean, a former history teacher at St. Margaret's Secondary School, was selected as Bandara's successor.

=== Pasir Ris Secondary School ===
Pasir Ris Secondary School, a 'neighbourhood school', began in January 1985 with 16 teachers and 400 students, of whom only five had selected the school as their first choice. Early on, Bandara herself was often questioned about her transfer from the prestigious Tanjong Katong Girls' School to a "brand new school in a brand new town". She came to view it as a "challenge to start from scratch".

The school first operated out of Yumin Primary School for five months as construction began on its proper premises, which had its official opening on 20 August 1987. Two days before the opening ceremony, Bandara realised that the event caterer had not prepared any halal food despite nearly a quarter of the 500 guests being Muslims from nearby Tampines. As such, she and the organising committee decided that the teachers and parents would cook halal food for the guests instead, with those involved phoning up acquaintances to come help out and the school's canteen vendors volunteering to aid in the effort. This led to her being confident that they could collaborate well, eventually resulting in her prioritisation of team sports. That event was one she often recounted.

Bandara was conferred the Pingat Pentadbiran Awam (Bronze) at the 1988 National Day Awards. In March 1989, it was reported that, under her principalship, the school's first cohort of Express stream students had achieved scores above the national average for their O Level examinations, despite having attained less than average results for their Primary School Leaving Examination. Additionally, a student became the first at the school to achieve eight distinctions at the O Levels. The Straits Times reported in November that the school's sporting achievements in the past year could "fill an entire A-4 page". Bandara commented: "You tell me how can I not be proud. We built the school from scratch." She also emphasised that the successes were the result of a team effort. The school took in 3,600 students in 1990. Around this period, Bandara was offered the chance to transfer to a different school as principal. She declined, feeling that her work at Pasir Ris was unfinished.

In July 1991, WEEKENDeast reported that the school would be attempting its first public relations campaign, marketing itself against the more prestigious independent schools in the country. The plan included a $5000 sound-and-slide show funded by a parent, and leaflets distributed to teachers at nearby primary schools. Bandara claimed that the campaign intended to present the school as a capable alternative to more prestigious institutions. She avoided giving talks in primary schools as she felt that that was too commercialised. In briefings with primary school teachers at Pasir Ris Secondary School, she focused on providing information on the secondary school system, which those teachers were largely unfamiliar with, as opposed to focusing on the successes of her school.

A survey toward the end of 1991 found that her presence was the leading factor in attracting new students, and she claimed to have been told by many parents from Tanjong Katong Girls' School that they had followed her on her transfer. In April 1992, the Minister of Parliament for Tampines Mah Bow Tan reportedly described Bandara as "very capable" and the school was a top 'neighbourhood school' in a conversation with Prime Minister Goh Chok Tong. She claimed in that year to have rejected caning as she "[did] not believe in it", instead finding that counselling was far more effective. She and her sister Nanda separately received the Most Courteous Principal Award in 1993. She also served on the steering committee of the Tampines Regional Library in this period.

=== Ang Mo Kio Secondary School ===
Bandara was transferred to Ang Mo Kio Secondary School, also a 'neighbourhood school', in 1995. She was offered a position as a school inspector and as the principal of yet another prestigious girls' school, as she felt the need to ensure a "strong base at the bottom of the pyramid". The vice principal of Ang Mo Kio Secondary School later recounted that, on learning of Bandara's transfer, she said: "Uh oh, the 'Dragon Lady' from the east is coming to colonise the north."

The school's teachers recalled that, while reputed to be a strict manager, Bandara was also known for being compassionate. She was known for handing out unusual punishments to students. In 1996, Bandara was promoted to a Superscale H salary grade, which came with additional duties. It was reported in 1997 that she had organised a programme for students to serve drinks and snacks to and hang out with the elderly at a corner run by the Ang Mo Kio Senior Citizen's Club as part of her plan to "develop well-rounded, responsible students." Bandara found that the students there often came from poorer households and thus had little exposure to theatre growing up. As such, she organised 'lecture-cum-demonstrations' in the arts from groups such as theatre company The Necessary Stage and contemporary dance company Frontier Danceland.

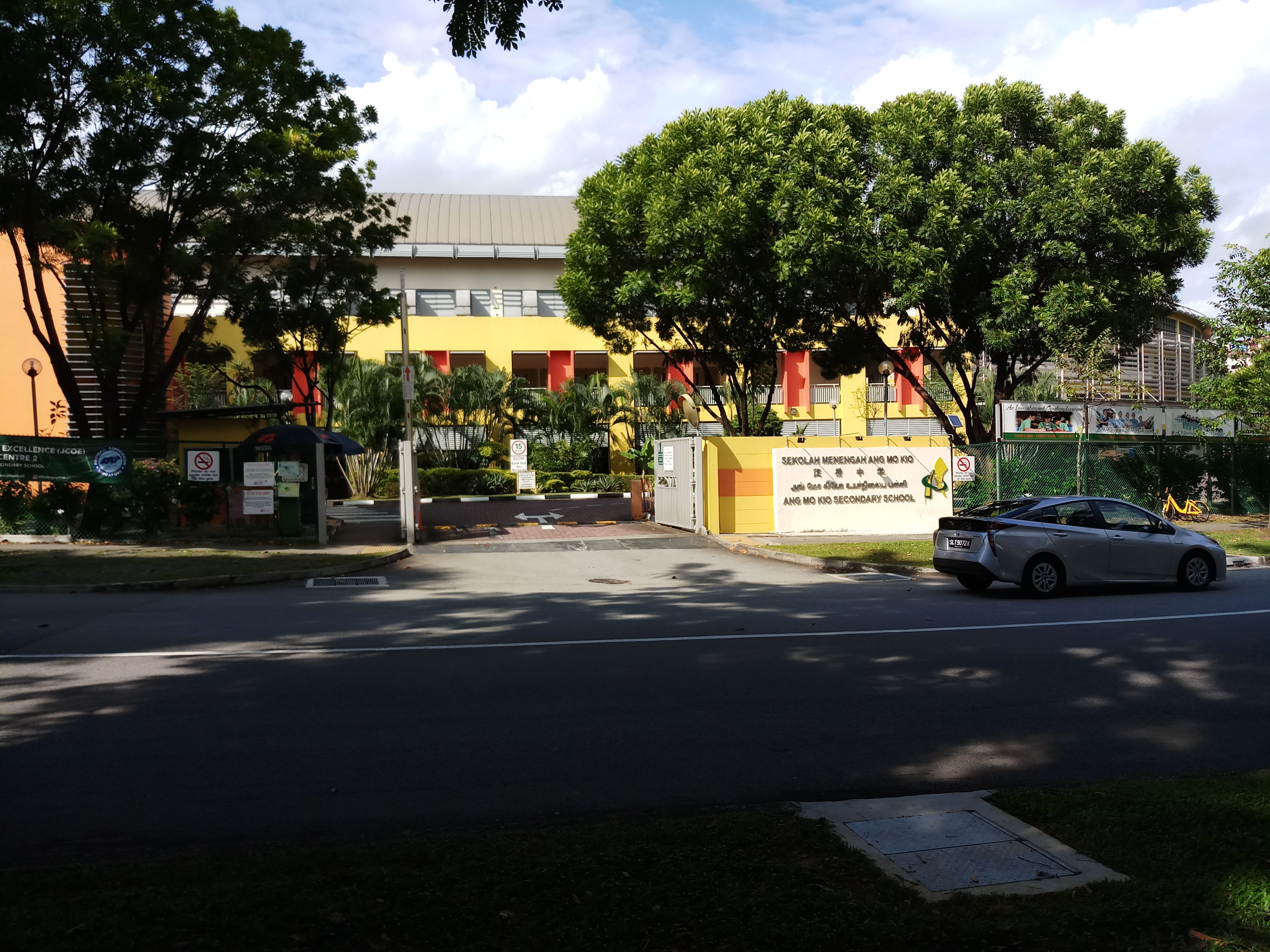
Ang Mo Kio Secondary School along Ang Mo Kio Street 22 in 2017

MOE decided in 1996 that the school was to relocate to Hougang in 2000, as its infrastructure needed an upgrade. Bandara did not agree with this due to the institution's ties to the Ang Mo Kio area, having been the first secondary school to be established in the town. 80% of the students were residents of the town and that the school was heavily involved in organising local community events. When she argued against the move, she was rebuffed by the ministry, who pointed out that more prestigious schools such as River Valley High School and Dunman High School had already moved away from their titular locations. She was told: "You are nobody, you are only Ang Mo Kio."

Dissatisfied with the ministry's response, she went to the local Member of Parliament and Deputy Prime Minister Lee Hsien Loong, who told her that the school's present facilities were lacking and that the site had been earmarked for the NCC's new headquarters. She did not accept this answer and said that, as the chairperson of the NCC's building committee, she knew that the site was not a likely candidate for that project. The two then "shared a good laugh", which was followed by a broader conversation on education. She secured the school's continued existence in Ang Mo Kio, although it was to move to Hougang for two years while the old premises were redeveloped.

In 1998, Bandara was appointed to the Feedback Unit Supervisory panel led by John Chen, the Minister of State for Communications and Information Technology, which was to gather feedback on recently introduced education policies. M. Nirmala of The Straits Times opined in 1999 that, with regards to a garden party with 600 guests that she had organised in the school's courtyard without seeking clearance from the Ministry of Education, Bandara "[typified] the growing breed of principals who [managed] their schools like companies—by leading people, producing results and answering to 'shareholders'". Ang Mo Kio Secondary School returned to Ang Mo Kio in 2002, though by then she was no longer its principal, having retired in 2000. Lee Hsien Loong said that she "moved heaven and earth" for what she believed in.

=== Post-retirement activities ===
By 2004, Bandara was a judge for the Budding Writers Project, a writing competition where children and teens could win the opportunity to have their work published in print. She was conferred the Pingat Bakti Masyarakat (Public Service Medal) at the 2008 National Day Awards. She was then sitting on the Panel of Advisers to the Juvenile Court. Bandara also sat on the Juvenile Probation Case Committee. In her later years, she remained an "outspoken champion of education" who was often quoted by local news outlets, notably as a harsh critic of the proposal to introduce banding into secondary schools.

== Personal life and death ==
Bandara was known affectionately as "Miss B." or "Mita" by teachers and students. She had two "maxims" in teaching: that one should treat all children as if they were one's own, and that one needed to "down to their level" to understand children. She said in 1991 that she felt "amply rewarded", having received recognition and loyalty from staff and affection from students, and in 1996, that she had kept all of the cards sent by students and teachers over the course of her career. She herself wrote and sent notes and cards to former colleagues and students, with whom she often kept in touch even after retiring; several former students considered her a "godmother". She could also speak Cantonese.

On 4 February 2013, Bandara underwent surgery at the Singapore General Hospital to remove a tumour in her liver. She had not revealed this to her friends as she did not wish to disturb them. She died in her sleep on 7 February of complications from the procedure, at the age of 70. Her wake, held the next day, was attended by roughly 100 former students and colleagues. Bryna Singh of The Straits Times proclaimed Bandara "one of Singapore's best-known educationists".
