= TPSS =

TPSS may refer to:

- Tampines Secondary School
- Tangipahoa Parish School System
- Traction power substation
- The Patrick Star Show
