= Kimberly Chia =

Singaporean actress (born 1995)

- Born: 7 August 1995 (age 31); Singapore
- Education: Compassvale Secondary School; Singapore Institute of Management
- Occupations: Actress; host; model; singer
- Spouse: Vincent Yeo (m. 2021)
- Children: 1
- Modeling information
- Height: 1.65 m (5 ft 5 in)

Chinese name
- Traditional Chinese: 謝靜儀
- Simplified Chinese: 谢静仪
- Hanyu Pinyin: Xiè Jìngyí

Kimberly Chia (born 7 August 1995) is a Singaporean actress.

== Early life and education ==
Chia studied at Compassvale Secondary School in 2008 and graduated in 2011. She wanted to study at LASALLE College of the Arts or mass communication at Ngee Ann Polytechnic upon graduating. However, she received lower than expected grades for her GCE 'O' Levels, with the L1R4 score, a measurement of success for polytechnic admission, being 2 points higher than expected. As a result, she had to consider other options such as business. Chia then studied at Singapore Institute of Management for a diploma in management studies.

== Career ==
Chia started as a model at age three. She was a print ad model for various companies, as well as a runway model in fashion shows. She picked up dancing, singing and acting afterwards, and participated in several MediaCorp dramas at the age of nine. Her first major role came with Fighting Spiders in 2009. Chia became famous after starring in drama On the Fringe (2011). She was given a role in Singaporean movie Timeless Love, directed by Lim Koong Hwee and Dasmond Koh.

Chia became the spokesperson for Norton 360 Multi-Device together with Xu Bin and Aloysius Pang in March 2013, and Osim's uSlender product in May 2013.

In December 2015, Chia announced that she would be attending acting course for two years and would not be participating in any drama for the next two years.

On 1 January 2016, Chia released her first single, Love Radio (爱情 Radio), where she made her singing debut.

Between 2016 and 2018, Chia was a flight attendant with Singapore Airlines.

In 2018, Chia returned to acting and acted in a Toggle drama series, Love at Cavenagh Bridge, where she acted as lovers with Aloysius Pang. She also acted in a Channel 8 drama called Say Cheese where she played lovers with Zong Zijie.

Chia would be involved as another supporting role in another Channel 8 Production drama called Heart To Heart.

== Personal life ==
Chia was married in 2021, to a businessman eight years older than her. At the same time, she announced that she was expecting her first child. On 4 May 2022, Chia announced that she had given birth to a boy.

== Filmography ==
=== Film ===
Year	Title	Role	Notes	Ref.
2011	It's a Great, Great World	Ah Luan		
2012	Timeless Love	Xiao Wei		
2012	Imperfect	Chen Shanshan		
2013	Love...and Other Bad Habits	Ann		

=== Television series ===
Year	Title	Role	Notes	Ref.
2007	Mandy and her Mighty Adventures	Adeline		
2009	Fighting Spiders	Yiling		
2010	Mrs P.I.	Zhang Jiaxin		
2011	Be Happy	Hebe		
2011	C.L.I.F.	Wang Shuyi	Cameo	
2011	On the Fringe 2011	Lin Yaxuan		
2011	A Song to Remember	Xiaocui		
2012	Show Hand	Zhang Sihui		
2012	Don't Stop Believin'	Deng Yilin		
2012	It Takes Two	Xueli		
2014	World at Your Feet	Ye Xiaofeng		
2014	Bot Hunters	Herself	Host	
2014	Rules Of Tham	Lee Tan		
2015	Tanglin	Lauren	Cameo	
2018	Love At Cavenagh Bridge	Jessie		
2018	Say Cheese	Ni Yuyan		
2018	Heart To Heart	Yue Xiaofang		
2019	Follow Your Heart	Jing Yi		
2019	The Encounter	Jane	A Directorial Debut Project	
2020	Victory Lap	He Anan		
2021	Live Your Dreams	Coco Yang		

== Discography ==
=== Singles ===
Year	Title	Album	Label	Ref
2016	Love Radio (爱情 Radio)	Non-album single	NoonTalk Media	

== Awards and nominations ==
Year	Awards	Category	Nominated work	Result	Ref
2012	Star Awards	Favourite Female Character	On The Fringe (as Ah Ya)	Nominated	
2013	Star Awards	Favourite Female Character	Don't Stop Believin' (as Deng Yilin)	Nominated	
2015	Star Awards	Favourite Female Character	World at Your Feet (as Ye Xiaofeng)	Nominated	
2015	Star Awards	Favourite Onscreen Couple (Drama)	World at Your Feet (as Ye Xiaofeng)	Nominated	
2019	Star Awards	Top 10 Most Popular Female Artistes	Say Cheese (as Ni Yuyan)	Nominated	
2021	Star Awards	Top 10 Most Popular Female Artistes	—N/a	Nominated	
