= Nobody's Child =

Nobody's Child may refer to:

== Film and television ==
- Nobody's Child (1919 film), a British silent film directed by George Edwardes Hall
- Nobody's Child (1970 film), a Philippine film featuring Vilma Santos
- Nobody's Child (1986 film), an American television film directed by Lee Grant
- Nobody's Child (2004 film), a Singaporean film directed by Lin Wenhui
- Nobody's Child (2021 film) (L'enfant de personne), telemovie directed by Akim Isker
- "Nobody's Child" (The Upper Hand), a 1996 television episode

== Literature ==
- Nobody's Child, a 1996 romantic novel by Pat Warren
- Nobody's Child, a 1997 romantic novel by Ann Major
- Nobody's Child, a 2003 children's novel by Marsha Skrypuch
- Nobody's Child, a 2007 autobiography by Michael Seed
- Nobody's Child, a 2014 crime novel by Libby Fischer Hellmann

== Music ==
- Nobody's Child: Romanian Angel Appeal, a 1990 charity album
- "Nobody's Child" (Hank Snow song), 1949; covered by Tony Sheridan and the Beatles (1964), the Traveling Wilburys (1990), and others
- "Nobody's Child" (Penny McLean song), 1976
- "Nobody's Child", a song by Electric Light Orchestra from Eldorado, 1974
- "Nobody's Child", a song by Mark Knopfler from Down the Road Wherever, 2018

== See also ==
- No One's Child, a 2014 Serbian film
- Nobody's Children (disambiguation)
