= List of World at Your Feet episodes =

MediaCorp Channel 8's television series World at Your Feet is a sports drama series produced by MediaCorp in 2014 as a lead-up to the 2014 FIFA World Cup held at Brazil. The series, which stars Ha Yu, Tay Ping Hui, Elvin Ng, Zhang Zhen Xuan, Jeanette Aw and Yvonne Lim as the main characters, depicts a group of men who overcome adversities to attain their goal through hard work and determination.

As of 24 June 2014, 30 episodes of World at Your Feet have aired, concluding the series.

== Episodes ==
No.	Title	Original release date
1	"Episode 1" "A football match is like life. There is a time limit, and no second takes （球赛好比人生 都有时限 不能重来）"	May 14, 2014 PG
2	"Episode 2" "If you like someone, tell him or her, for you should never take tomorrow for granted （喜欢一个人，最好坦白说出来，因为你不知道，明天和意外，哪一个会先到？）"	May 15, 2014 PG
3	"Episode 3" "The one who hurts you the most is usually the one closest to you （伤你最深的，往往是你最熟悉和相信的人）"	May 16, 2014 PG
4	"Episode 4" "Men age, but they don't get better! （男人，只会越变越老，不会越变越好！）"	May 19, 2014 PG
5	"Episode 5" "No one is so rich that he never needs help, and no one is so poor that he cannot help others （没有人 富有得不须要别人的帮助 也没有人 穷得无法帮助别人）"	May 20, 2014 PG
6	"Episode 6" "Love is really just three words - Initially, it is "I love you". What comes after that is "I am sorry". When everything is taken into consideration, it is "How are you?" （爱情 说穿了也不过是三个字 最初是 我爱你 然后就 对不起 最后只剩下 你好吗）"	May 21, 2014 PG
7	"Episode 7" "You don't know who you love most until you are drunk, you don't know who loves you most until trouble strikes （有时候要等到喝醉了 才知道你最爱谁 而总是要等到出事了 才知道谁最爱你）"	May 22, 2014; PG Some Sexual References
8	"Episode 8" "The reason why I fell for him is also the reason why I left him （没想到当初让我爱上他的理由 最后竟然成为离开他的导火线）"	May 23, 2014 PG
9	"Episode 9" "I need your guidance since I'm young, but please spare me the gossip （我年轻 需要你指点 但不是指指点点）"	May 26, 2014 PG
10	"Episode 10" "All houses are the same. Even the prison cell also has a doorway for one to enter and exit （所有的房子都一样 就算是监狱 也有一扇可以进出的门）"	May 27, 2014 PG
11	"Episode 11" "Some people would go the extra mile for their friends. But they would also stab their friends in the back to save their own hide （有些人为了朋友 可以两肋插刀 可是为了自己 也可以插朋友两刀）"	May 28, 2014 PG
12	"Episode 12" "No matter how capable a woman is, she can still be reduced to a little girl when it comes to love （多精明干练的女人 在爱情面前 有时还不如一名 小学生）"	May 29, 2014 PG
13	"Episode 13" "There are two tragedies in life - one is not getting what you want, and the other is getting what you don't want （人生有两大悲剧 一个是得不到你想要的东西 一个是得到了你不想要的东西）"	May 30, 2014 PG
14	"Episode 14" "The most precious things in the world are free - sunshine, air, dreams, true love, faith, hope （在这个世界上 最珍贵的东西都是免费的 如 阳光 空气 理想 真情 信念 希望）"	June 2, 2014 PG
15	"Episode 15" "Separation is a painful word. When a married couple separates, it's akin to being stabbed repeatedly （分字折开 就是八刀 夫妻离异 宛如身中八刀 过犹不及）"	June 3, 2014 PG
16	"Episode 16" "There are three keys to success - 1. be steadfast, 2. be thick-skinned, 3. be steadfastly thick-skinned （成功的秘诀有三要点 一是坚持 二是不要脸 三是坚持不要脸）"	June 4, 2014 PG
17	"Episode 17" "The world of adults is strange - they love to complicate simple things （大人的世界很奇怪 总是喜欢把简单的事情 变得很复杂）"	June 5, 2014 PG
18	"Episode 18" "No one would say no to money. But if all you care about is money, you'll make life difficult for yourself （没有人会跟钱过不去 只是 如果只懂得向钱看 那就是在跟自己过不去）"	June 6, 2014 PG
19	"Episode 19" "When we talk about previous lives, we are trying to delude ourselves, when we talk about next lives, we are trying to fool others （说有上辈子的人 是在骗自己 说有下辈子的人 是在骗别人）"	June 9, 2014 PG
20	"Episode 20" "Oftentimes, we only see the distant splendour, but fail to see the happiness right under our noses （我们往往看得到 很远的美景 却看不到离自己 最近的幸福）"	June 10, 2014 PG
21	"Episode 21" "It's fine to have weaknesses, but not so fine when you have no distinguishing characteristics （人不怕有缺点 最怕的是没特点）"	June 11, 2014 PG
22	"Episode 22" "You may be busy pursuing your dreams. But don't become too busy to pursue your dream （一个人可以为了梦想而忙碌 可是不能因为忙碌而忘了追求梦想）"	June 12, 2014 PG
23	"Episode 23" "When others call you a lunatic, that's when you know you're approaching success （当别人开始说你是疯子的时候 你离成功就不远了）"	June 13, 2014 PG
24	"Episode 24" "It is OK to make mistakes, but terrible not to admit your mistakes. It is worse to cover up your past mistakes by making more mistakes （犯错并不可怕 可怕的是不愿意认错 再用另一个错误来掩饰 一错再错）"	June 16, 2014 PG
25	"Episode 25" "After listening to all the lies, hearing the truth ends up hurting the most （在一连串的谎言当中 最伤人的往往是那一句真话）"	June 17, 2014 PG
26	"Episode 26" "A pretty woman is a gem; a wise and kind woman is a treasure trove （漂亮的女人是宝石 有智慧和爱心的女人是宝库）"	June 18, 2014 PG
27	"Episode 27" "We only live once, yet the hardest thing is to live life to the fullest （生命只有一次 最大的难度就是让它过得精彩）"	June 19, 2014 PG
28	"Episode 28" "There's a difference between a lie and a promise: The deceived takes the lie seriously, while the person who made a promise takes the promise seriously （谎言和誓言的差别在于： 一个是听的人当真了，一个是说的人当真了）"	June 20, 2014 PG
29	"Episode 29" "There are no paths you can't pass through, only things you can't figure out （世上没有走不通的路，只有想不通的人）"	June 23, 2014 PG
30	"Episode 30 (Finale)" "This world is not for the rich, neither is it for the powerful, it is for those with gritty determination （这个世界，不是有钱人的世界，也不是有权人的世界，它是有心人的世界）"	June 24, 2014 PG

== See also ==
- List of programmes broadcast by Mediacorp Channel 8
- World at Your Feet
