= Tampines Junior College =

College in Singapore (1986–2019)

Coordinates: 1.3573°N 103.9562°E

Tampines Junior College 淡滨尼初级学院 Maktab Rendah Tampines

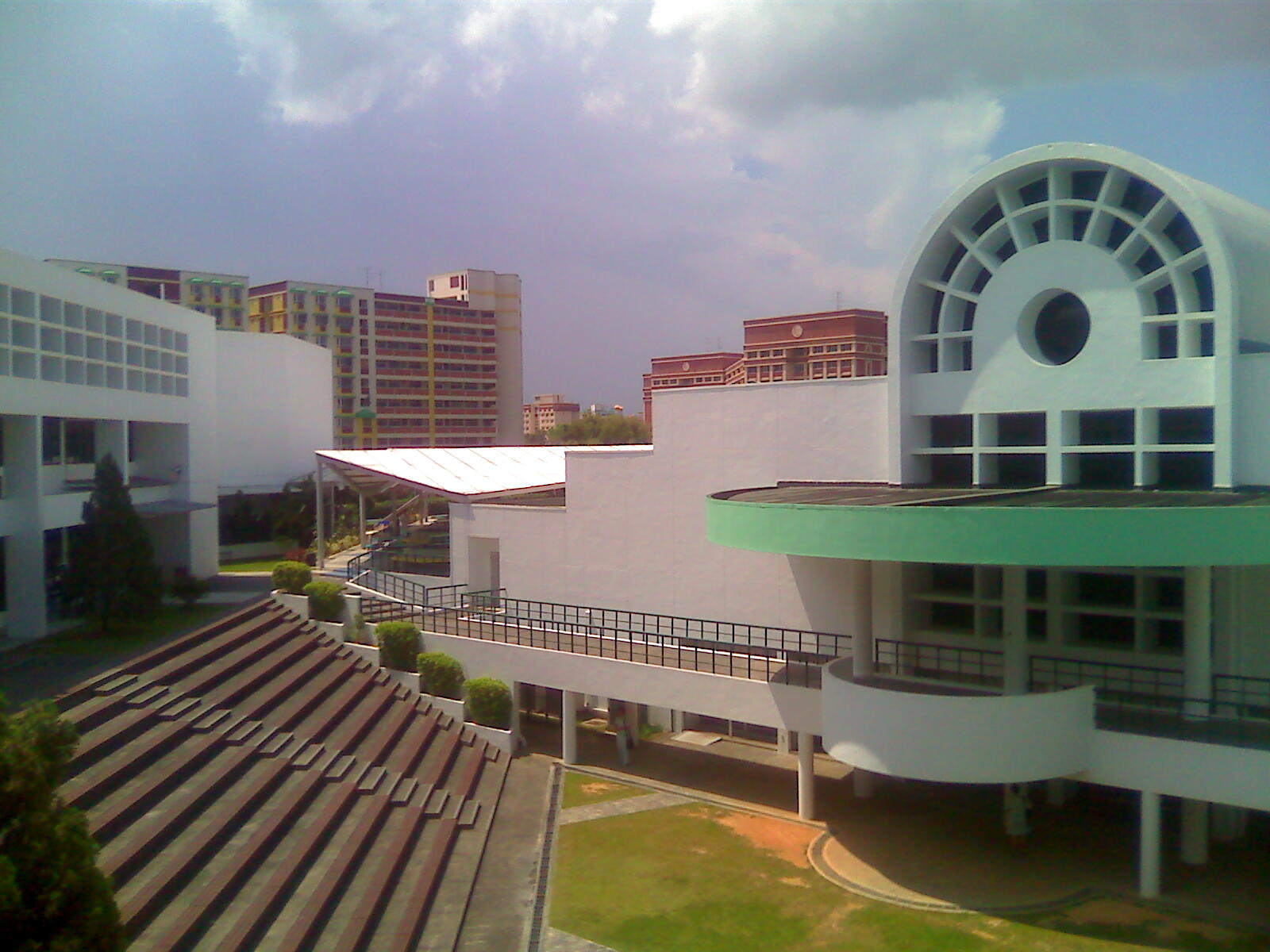

Location
- 2 Tampines Avenue 9, Singapore 529564

Information
- Type: Government co-educational
- Motto: Aim and Achieve
- Established: 1986; 40 years ago
- Closed: 2019; 7 years ago
- Session: Single
- School code: 0709
- Principal: Ms. Pamela Yoong
- Enrolment: Approx. 1,800
- Colour: Green
- Website: tpjc.moe.edu.sg

Tampines Junior College (Abbreviation: TPJC) was a junior college located in Tampines, Singapore, offering a two-year course for pre-university students leading up to the Singapore-Cambridge GCE Advanced Level examination.

== History ==
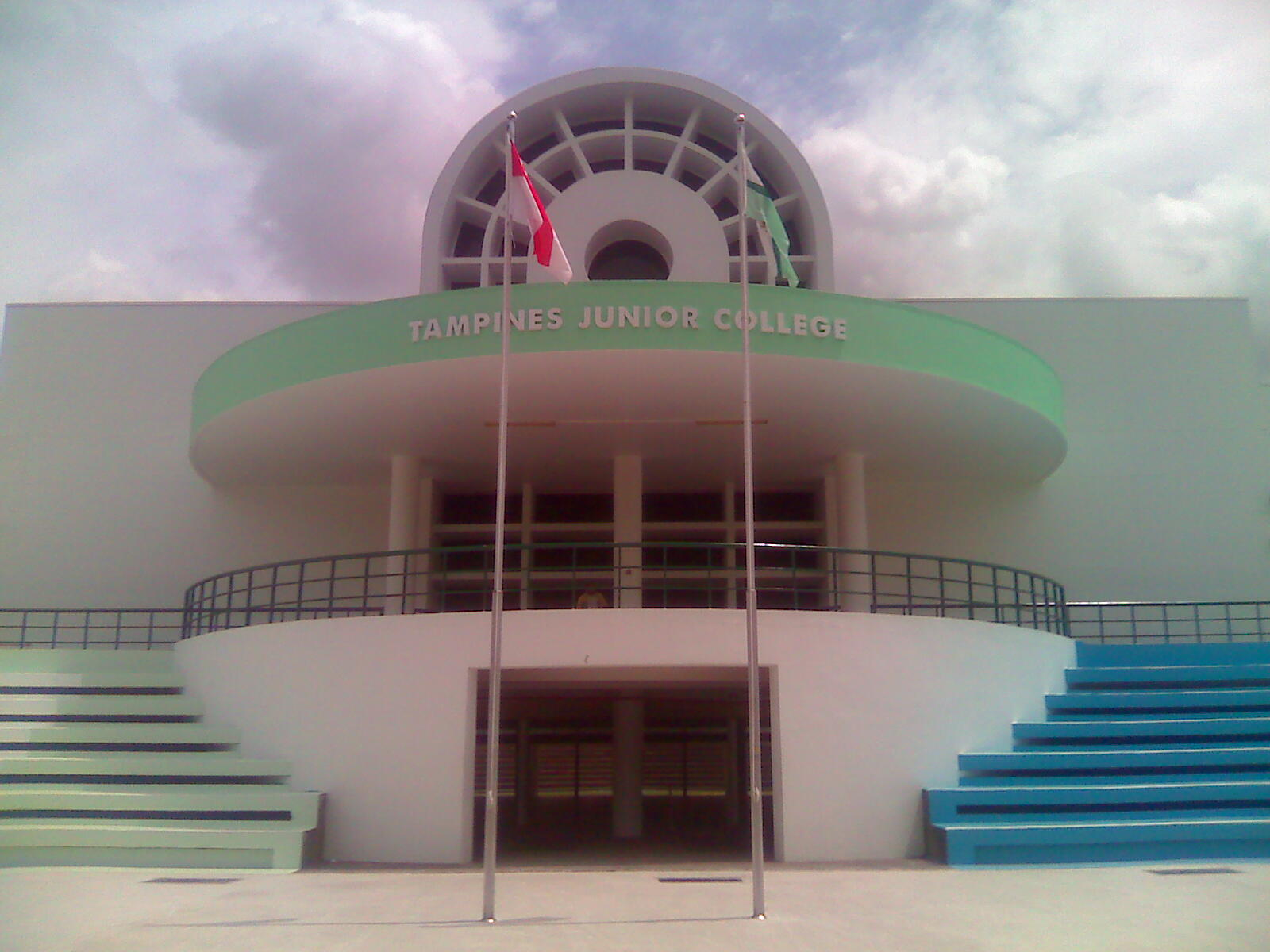
The facade of Tampines Junior College

Tampines Junior College was founded in 1986, and was the thirteenth junior college to be established in Singapore.

TPJC began functioning as a centre of pre-university education on 11 April 1986. Pioneering teachers of the college held their first meeting in Tampines Primary School, while the first batch of students studied in a building which became Tampines Secondary School.

On 20 December 1986, the handing over ceremony marked the completion of Tampines Junior College. In late December, the College moved to its present site at 2 Tampines Avenue 9. Sitting on 6 hectares of land and costing about $18.2 million, Tampines Junior College was the 13th college to be built. Designed by P&T Architects, Tampines Junior College received the best-designed college building award in 1988.

On 1 July 1988, the college had its official opening ceremony, which was attended by Mr Phua Bah Lee, then Senior Parliamentary Secretary (Defence) and Member of Parliament for Tampines.

TPJC celebrated its 20th anniversary in 2006. In January 2007, the college became one of the four pre-university centres to offer Theatre Studies and Drama as an examinable subject.

=== Merger ===
On 20 April 2017, it was announced that TPJC would merge with Meridian Junior College (MJC), with the merged school located at the current site of MJC . This was in view of the declining cohort sizes since 2014, which was attributed to the fall in Singapore's birth rate. As a result of the merger, TPJC would stop taking in students from 2018 to minimise the need for students to physically relocated to the new site. The merged school operates under the name of Tampines Meridian Junior College, which is the combination of the two schools' names, from 2019. TPJC's current principal, Ms Pamela Yoong, will be the new principal of Tampines Meridian Junior College.

=== School Premises ===
On 23 April 2020, 210m of copper cable worth S$11,000 was stolen from the vacant Tampines Junior College at 3.36am.

On 1 June 2020, it was announced that the vacant school premises will be converted as temporary accommodation for migrant workers due to the COVID-19 pandemic in Singapore.

Starting 2024, the former Tampines Junior College site will be used to house Temasek Junior College during their infrastructure rejuvenation programme.

== Principal ==
Name	Years served
Yahya Aljaru	1986–1992
Lee Kah Chuen	1992–1997
Susan Chan Yoke Kate	1997–2002
Goh Hwee Choo	2002–2006
Helen Choo Chieh Chen	2007–2014
Pamela Yoong	2015–2019

== College Identity and Culture ==
=== Crest ===
The College Crest was designed by a pioneer student.

=== Uniform ===
The uniform design was the product of the efforts of students and staff. Male students wear a light green short-sleeved shirt with long pants. Female students wear a blouse and A-line skirt of the same colour. Many female students choose to wear shorts underneath their skirts too, though this is optional. There are no rules governing coloured undergarments as the blouse is not white in colour.

=== Anthem ===
TPJC's anthem was composed by a pioneer teacher, Ms. Lilian Chia, with music by Antony Albuquerque.

=== House System ===
The house system was begun in 2006; replacing the practice of assigning students to houses based on their stream of study. Each cohort of J1 students is divided into six houses:

- Eagle (red)
- Falcon (orange)
- Hawk (yellow)
- Heron (purple)
- Phoenix (blue)
- Seagull (grey)

Each house is led by the House Captain and Vice-captain. The house captains also head committees that comprise student representatives drawn from each class under the house.

Every year, House events organised by the House Committee include the Inter-House Track & Field, Inter-House Cheerleading and Road Run. During the Inter-House Track & Field, students represent their houses in events. Besides track and field events, students win points for their houses by cheerleading, mascot and flag design competitions.

In 2013, the House Wall was painted and created in as an avenue to display the accomplishments in each House. The House Wall features the current points standing of each House and captures each unique House culture. It is located at the B Block of the college.

In 2014, the House shirts were re-designed to reflect the stronger House identity present in the college. The shirts featured the House colours more prominently and were meant to make students from each House more distinctive during House events.

== Academic Information ==
=== Subjects offered ===
TPJC map

TPJC is among the few colleges in Singapore that offers the full range of subjects under the new GCE A-Level syllabus introduced in 2006. Under this system, students take 3 H2 content-based subjects and 4 H1 subjects comprising Mother Tongue, Project Work, General Paper and one contrasting subject. Students who wish to challenge themselves academically may take up to 4 H2 content-based subjects.

The college does not prohibit students from taking a particular GCE A-level subject, even if they have less than stellar grades for the subject at the GCE O-level. Instead, with the exception of Physics (which requires extensive prior knowledge at the O-level), students are allowed to pursue subjects they have not previously studied in secondary school, if they pass strict qualifying tests.

Students who wish to take H2 Theatre Studies and Drama (TSD) have to sit for aptitude tests and undergo interviews.

=== Language Elective Programmes ===
TPJC is one of two pre-university centres that offer the Malay Language Elective Programme (MLEP). Under this programme, students study the Malay language, literature and culture at greater depth; and are given opportunities to go on trips to the Middle East, Malaysia and Indonesia.

== Co-curricular activities ==
TPJC is known for its Performing Arts with niche CCA groups such as the Symphonic Band, Choir, Guitar Ensemble, the Chinese Language Debating and Drama Society, Chinese Orchestra, Indian Dance, Modern Dance, Malay Dance, English Drama Club, and more, all of which have received numerous awards at the Singapore Youth Festival.

=== The Student Council ===
Student councillors of Tampines Junior College

The Junior College Student Council, set up in 1986, has a long history of serving the student population and upholding the college's values. The TPJC Council acts as a link between the College Administration and the student body. It is the student representation of the highest standing, subject to the authority of the Principal. The highest office a student can hold in College is that of President of the Student Council, and his/her services are acknowledged by the college.

The college gives priority to the Student Councillors when it comes to talks, seminars, symposiums and conventions. Every year, two councillors from the college represent the school at the Prime Minister's National Day Rally Speech, the Budget speech, and other events of national importance, such as PM Lee Hsien Loong's inauguration at the Istana in 2004. In addition, councillors receive luminaries and other distinguished guests to the college, together with the principal. In 2007; as well as ushers and general helpers at the launch of the European Union's programme for schools in Singapore, with more than 10 ambassadors representing their respective European countries coming down to the college to celebrate this highly anticipated event.

== Publications ==
=== The TPJC Link ===
The TPJC Link, originally known as TPlink, is the college's quarterly magazine. Written and managed by a team of student writers, the magazine is distributed to all staff and students for a nominal fee, deducted annually under a general miscellany fee. Since the January–March 2008 issue, the magazine has extended its coverage of college events from a 12 to 16-page spread.

=== TPJCian Magazine ===
TPJCian Magazine was established in March 2008 by a second year student, Md Azhar B Aziz. Its student-driven content and use of videos, podcasts and online discussions enables students to find news of campus life and stimulates them intellectually with its articles, reviews and study resources.

The online magazine publishes new content twice or more a week, with editorials on current affairs, essays on General Paper topics, reviews of college's performances and concerts and views on college life. The magazine's editorial policy allows all students to submit their articles for consideration.

The magazine has established a following among online users of the college, breaking ground in June 2008 by being the first website related/linked with a local educational institution to conduct an onsite, real-time discussion on current affairs, open to public users.

== Notable alumni ==
- Abdul Muhaimin: Workers' Party MP for Sengkang GRC
- Amrin Amin: former Parliamentary Secretary and former Member of Parliament
- Jade Seah: Mediacorp artiste
- Suhaimi Yusof: Actor and comedian
- Faraliza Tan: Miss Singapore World 2008
