= Meridian Junior College =

College in Singapore (2003–2019)

Coordinates: 1°22′36.246″N 103°56′15.19″E

- 美廉初級學院; Maktab Rendah Meridian மெரிடியன் ஜூனியர் கல்லூரி

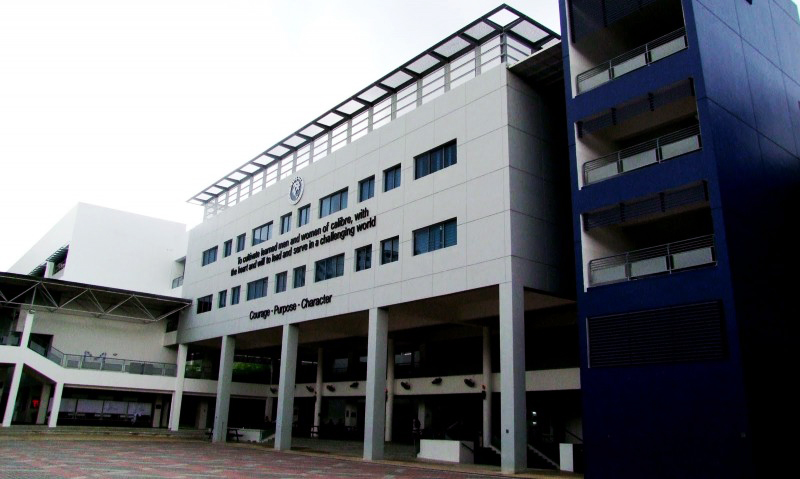

Location
- 21 Pasir Ris Street 71; Singapore 518799

Information
- Type: Government; Co-educational
- Motto: Courage. Purpose. Character.
- Established: 2003; 23 years ago
- Closed: 2019; 7 years ago
- Session: Single-session
- School code: 0712
- Principal: Mr. Lim Yan Hock
- Enrolment: Approx. 1,500
- Colour: Blue Silver
- Website: meridianjc.moe.edu.sg

Meridian Junior College (MJC) was a junior college in Singapore, offering two-year pre-university courses leading up to the Singapore-Cambridge GCE Advanced Level examination. Situated in the eastern residential estate of Pasir Ris, it is the sixteenth junior college established in Singapore.

== History ==
=== Founding years ===
Meridian Junior College was established in 2003 after Teo Chee Hean, the then Education Minister, suggested building a new junior college in Pasir Ris. Its first principal was Ms Esther Lai Choon Lian.

In 2005, the college hosted its official opening ceremony on 25 February, graced by Teo, and observed its first ever College Day on the 23rd of July.

Under Lai's leadership of, the college became a single-pointer JC (based on L1R5 admission) in less than a decade.

=== Incorporation of Tampines Junior College ===
On 20 April 2017, it was announced that Meridian Junior College would merge with Tampines Junior College, and continues to operate at its current site under the new name of Tampines Meridian Junior College, which is the combination of the two schools' names, from 2019. TPJC's current principal, Ms Pamela Yoong, will take over as the new principal of Tampines Meridian Junior College. The merger was in view of the declining cohort sizes since 2014, which was attributed to the fall in Singapore's birth rate.

== Principal ==
| Name of Principal | Years served |
|---|---|
| Esther Lai Choon Lian | 2003 - 2014 |
| Lim Yan Hock | 2015–2018 |

== School Identity & Culture ==
Students from Meridian Junior College are referred to as "Meridians", which reflects a close identity with the college.

=== Insignia, motto and value ===
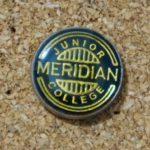
Old collar pin of Meridian Junior College.

Meridian Junior College's insignia is a grey lion.

The college's motto is "Courage. Purpose. Character."

=== House system ===
- Atlas (Gold, Dragon)
- Callisto (Blue, Eagle)
- Miranda (Black, Stallion)
- Phobos (Red, Phoenix)
- Triton (Green, Triton)

== Campus ==
Meridian Junior College's campus include a gym, rehearsal rooms for performing arts groups (with pianos and dance studios), and a library in a 2-storey block, run by the National Library Board. The college has a fully air-conditioned hall, five lecture theatres equipped with audio-visual equipment, and a sports block and track.

Since 2008, students have access to the school's Integrated Virtual Learning Environment (IVLE), which allows students to discuss assignments online as well as access to academic databases such as The Economist and Science Resource Center. There is also the MJC Leisure and Learning portal where students can sign up for Organised Student Activities, submit suggestions and gain endorsement for participation in projects.

Currently Meridian Junior College have installed Lecture Recording system, in 2016, allowing students to view lectures during breaks and after school.

== Academic information ==
Meridian Junior College offers Arts and Science courses that leads up to the Singapore-Cambridge GCE Advanced Level examinations. Students at Meridian Junior College are allowed to take up to four subjects at Higher 2 (H2) level. Students with aptitude and deeper interests in subjects can apply to take up to two subjects at Higher 3 (H3) level.

=== Academic subjects ===
The list of subjects offered by Meridian Junior College is featured below.

| H1 Level | H2 Level | H3 Level |
|---|---|---|
| Biology; Chemistry; Mother Tongue; Economics; General Paper; Geography; History; Literature In English; Mathematics; Physics; Project Work; General Studies in Chinese; Art | History; Geography; Literature in English; Mother Tongue Language and Literature; China Studies in English; Theatre Studies and Drama; Mathematics; Further Mathematics; Physics; Chemistry; Biology | Biology; Chemistry; Physics; Mathematics; History; Economics; Geography; Literature in English |

== Co-curricular activities (CCAs) ==
Meridian Junior College offers a wide variety of CCAs which comprises 14 sports teams, 12 clubs & societies and 6 performing arts groups. Meridian Junior College has a niche in football, with nine National School Games 'A' Division Football Championship titles attained in fifteen years.

A full listing of Co-curricular Activities offered by Meridian Junior College is featured below.

| Sports | | Clubs & Societies | | Performing Arts |
|---|---|---|---|---|
| Archery Badminton Basketball Fencing Football Floorball Rock Climbing | Shooting Squash Table Tennis Taekwondo Tennis Volleyball Wushu | Business Club College Publications Debates Society Health & Fitness Club Intellectual Games Club Library Society Media Resource Club | Outdoor Adventure Club Paddlers Club Photography Club Service Learning Club Students' Council | Band Chinese Orchestra Choir Dance Drama Guitar Ensemble |

== See also ==
- Education in Singapore
