= Timeless Love (film) =

- Directed by: Lim Koon Hwee; Dasmond Koh
- Produced by: David Leong
- Starring: Aloysius Pang; Cynthia Ruby Wang; Kimberly Chia; Xu Bin; Joshua Ang; Michelle Tay; Josephine Chan; Eugene Lim
- Production company: NoonTalk Media
- Distributed by: Shaw Organisation
- Release date: 8 March 2012 (Singapore)
- Country: Singapore
- Language: Mandarin

Timeless Love (Chinese: 那个夏天; pinyin: nà gè xià tiān) is a Singaporean romance drama film about teenage love and loss. It is directed by Singaporean Christopher Lim (林坤辉) and TV personality Dasmond Koh. It was released on 8 March 2012.

== Plot ==
The plot mostly revolves around Morgan, who finds an island lease and a photo of a mysterious-looking stranger posing on an island whilst looking through his grandmother's belongings. Morgan somehow recalls that his grandmother used to tell him tales of her regrets with regards to a watch and the island when he was younger. Intrigued on the identity of the mysterious man and to escape the paparazzi, he decides to head off to the island to unravel the mysteries and find answers. As he went to the island, he found 3 teenagers. Love blossoms. But, are they related or what do all of them got to do with the island?

== Cast ==
- Kimberly Chia as Xiao Wei 小微
- Aloysius Pang as Morgan
- Xu Bin as Sky
- Joshua Ang as Eden
- Cynthia Ruby Wang as Nai Nai 奶奶
- Michelle Tay as Yi Da Li
- J. Chan as Pepper
- Eugene Lim as Uri

== Production ==
The film was produced by NoonTalk Media with Christopher Lim and Dasmond Koh as directors.
