= List of Don't Stop Believin' episodes =

Below is an episodic synopsis of Don't Stop Believin', which consists of 20 episodes and a sneak preview, and will be broadcast on MediaCorp Channel 8.

== Episodic synopsis ==
No. in season	Title	Rating	Original release date	Repeat telecast
0	"Sneak Peek"	PG	August 9, 2012	-
A short 15-minute programme showing some of the behind-the-scenes, NGs and a preview of the drama.
1	"Episode 1"	PG (Some Disturbing Scenes)	August 14, 2012	December 6, 2013
2	"Episode 2"	PG	August 15, 2012	December 9, 2013
3	"Episode 3"	PG (Juvenile Delinquency)	August 16, 2012	December 10, 2013
4	"Episode 4"	PG	August 17, 2012	December 11, 2013
5	"Episode 5"	PG (Some Sexual References)	August 20, 2012	December 12, 2013
6	"Episode 6"	PG	August 21, 2012	December 13, 2013
7	"Episode 7"	PG	August 22, 2012	December 16, 2013
8	"Episode 8"	PG	August 23, 2012	December 17, 2013
9	"Episode 9"	PG	August 24, 2012	December 18, 2013
10	"Episode 10"	PG (Juvenile Delinquency)	August 27, 2012	December 19, 2013
11	"Episode 11"	PG	August 28, 2012	December 20, 2013
12	"Episode 12"	PG (Juvenile Delinquency)	August 29, 2012	December 23, 2013
13	"Episode 13"	PG (Juvenile Delinquency)	August 30, 2012	December 24, 2013
14	"Episode 14"	PG	August 31, 2012	December 25, 2013
15	"Episode 15"	PG	September 3, 2012	December 26, 2013
16	"Episode 16"	PG	September 4, 2012	December 27, 2013
17	"Episode 17"	PG	September 5, 2012	December 30, 2013
18	"Episode 18"	PG	September 6, 2012	January 2, 2014
19	"Episode 19"	PG (Juvenile Delinquency)	September 7, 2012	January 3, 2014
20	"Episode 20 (Finale)"	PG	September 10, 2012	January 6, 2014

== See also ==
- List of programmes broadcast by Mediacorp Channel 8
- Don't Stop Believin'
