= Missing You (2008 film) =

Missing You...
- Directed by: Lin Kun Hui
- Starring: Dasmond Koh; Joshua Ang; Hsu Chiung Fang; Christina Lim; John Cheng
- Distributed by: InnoForm Media
- Release date: 2008 (Singapore)
- Running time: 77 mins
- Country: Singapore
- Language: Mandarin

Missing You... (Chinese: 想你的时候; pinyin: xiǎng nǐ dè shí hoù) is a 2008 Singaporean romance cum drama film about the highs and lows of the Singaporean getai trade. Directed by Lin Kun Hui, the film stars Joshua Ang, Christina Lim, Dasmond Koh, Hsu Chiung Fang and John Cheng.

== Cast ==
- Dasmond Koh as Simon
- Joshua Ang as Qiang
- Christina Lim as Zhen
