= Freda Gwilliam =

British colonial educationalist

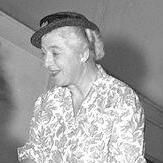
- Freda Gwilliam in Singapore
- Born: 29 July 1907; Feltham
- Died: 14 August 1987; Frant
- Education: Girton College

Freda Howitt Gwilliam (1907–1987) was a British educationist concerned about the education of girls and women in the British Empire. She was referred to as the "Great Aunt of British Colonial Education".

== Life ==
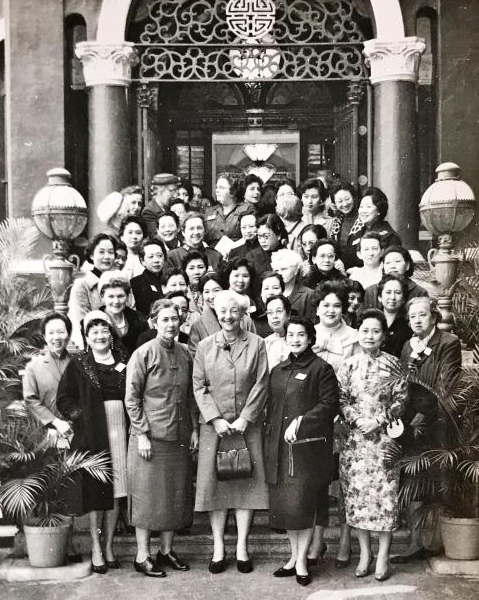
Gwilliam and the Hong Kong Council of Women of the YWCA, 19 October 1953

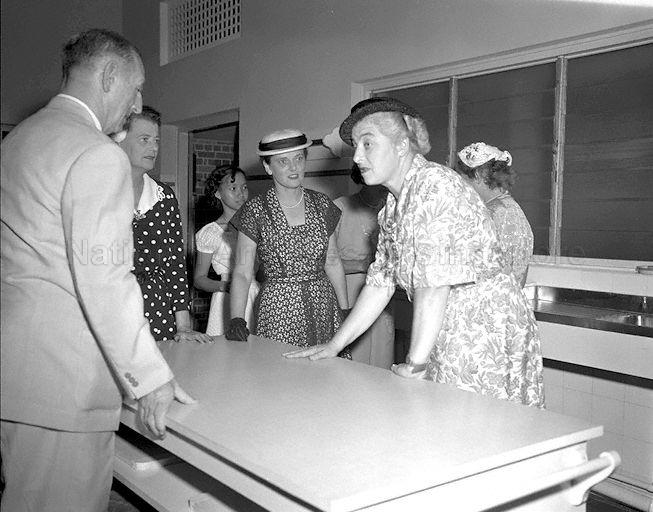
Gwilliam at Tanjong Katong Girls' School Singapore's newly opened English Girls School in 1954

Gwilliam was born in Feltham in 1907. Her parents were Kate Elizabeth (born Howitt) and Frederick William Gwilliam. Her father was a prison governor. She left Rochester Girl's Grammar School to read history at Girton College in Cambridge. She graduated in 1929 although women did not receive their degrees until 1948. She went to teach at Falmouth county high school and then at Francis Holland School for girls. In 1936 she became a lecturer in Chichester at Bishop Otter Teachers' Training College.

Five years later, in 1941, she went to lead Brighton Training College. Space was at a premium and some of the colleges lessons were held in the Royal Pavilion.

In 1947 she gave up being a college principal to work at Britain's Colonial Office in a newly created role of "woman educational adviser". She worked for Sir Christopher Cox and it was her job to travel around the huge British Empire to meet Directors of Education to find out about the education of women and girls. She wrote one of her early reports with Margaret Read about the education of women and girls education in Nyasaland.

In the 1950s she guest lectured at UCL Institute of Education. When she was not touring the empire she interviewed women for key roles in education.

She joined a large number of voluntary organisations including the executive committee of Voluntary Service Overseas in 1963, which in time she chaired.

In 1966 her 1954 OBE was upgraded to a Commander of the Order of the British Empire in the Birthday Honours list.

She retired in 1970 as Deputy Chief Education Adviser to the Minister in the Ministry of Overseas Development, but she returned in 1972 to join the Pearce Commission which was tasked with deciding whether the newly proposed constitution for Rhodesia was acceptable. She was the only woman on the large team.

Gwilliam died in hospital in Tunbridge Wells on 14 August,1987, having moved to the village of Frant with her sister-in-law, Una Gwilliam, in 1966 after the death of her brother, Brigadier Desmond "Twink" Gwilliam in June of that year. She known as the "Great Aunt of British Colonial Education".
