= Ang Mo Kio Secondary School =

Coordinates: 1°22′4.1″N 103°50′34.8″E

- 茂乔中学; Sekolah Menengah Ang Mo Kio

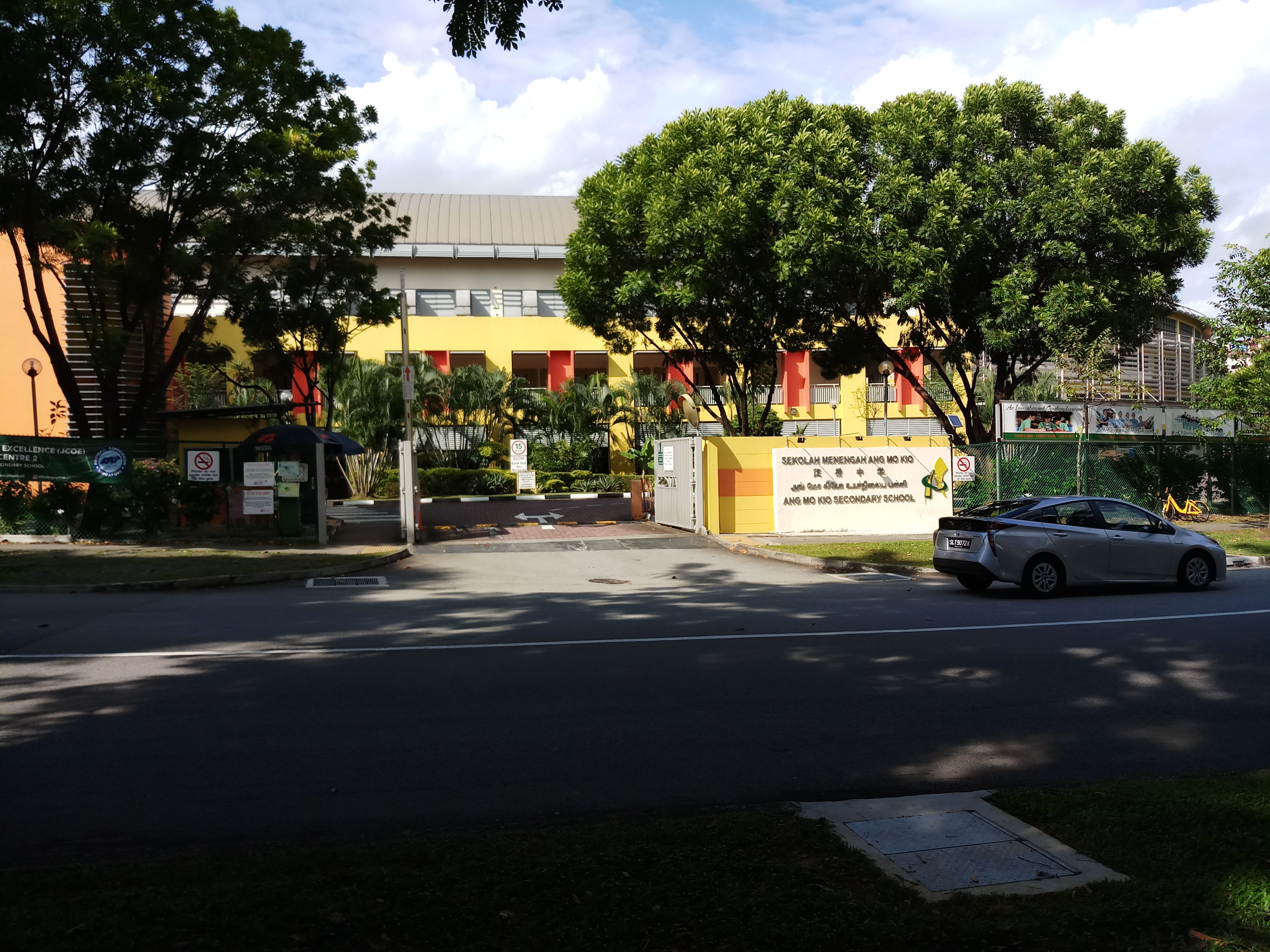

Location
- 6 Ang Mo Kio Street 22; Singapore 569362

Information
- Type: Government
- Motto: Always strive for the best
- Established: 2 January 1979; 47 years ago
- Session: Single
- School code: 3026
- Principal: Mr. Ashraf Hyder Yusoff Maniam
- Enrolment: 1500+
- Colour: Green Yellow
- Website: angmokiosec.moe.edu.sg

Ang Mo Kio Secondary School (AMKSS) is a co-educational government secondary school in Ang Mo Kio, Singapore, offering education for Secondary 1 to Secondary 5. Students at AMKSS are known as AMKsians.

== History ==
The school was the first school to be built in Ang Mo Kio. It officially started functioning on 2 January 1979 in the premises of Hwi Yoh Secondary School with 12 Secondary One classes. On 12 July that year, the school occupied its premises at Ang Mo Kio Street 22 and was officially declared open on 20 September 1980 by Yeo Toon Chia, the Member of Parliament for Ang Mo Kio Constituency. It was located along that road, in a new building that was built at a cost of S$4.29 million, and started upper secondary classes the next year. In December 1999, the school temporarily relocated to Hougang Street 93. In 2002, the school returned to Ang Mo Kio Street 22. The school was headed by the pioneer Principal, Tan Joo Kheng, followed by Monica Quek Swee Imm, Tan Guat Kim, Doreen Yip, Paramita Bandara, Tan Swee Piang, Tan Chee Siong, Abdul Mannan and Tom Chan. Since 15 Dec 2017, Shaw Swee Tat took over the school as Principal

In December 1999, it moved to temporary premises at Hougang Street 93 to enable rebuilding on the former site. From January 2002, Ang Mo Kio Secondary School started operating at its newly built premises in Ang Mo Kio Street 22. The new building was declared open on 13 July that year by Seng Han Thong, Member of Parliament for Ang Mo Kio GRC.

== School Identity & Culture ==
=== Discipline ===
Behavioural standards are maintained through a merit/demerit points system. Students who commit major offences may be punished by detention, caning (for boys only) or suspension, in addition to receiving counselling and being placed under the Student Reformative Programme for a period of time as stipulated by the Discipline Committee. There is also a Peer Mediation Programme for the resolution of disputes.

=== Events ===
Biannually, the school puts on its NOMAD (Night Of Music And Dance) festival, whose origins lie in the AMKSS Integrated Arts Programme (IAP) for all Secondary 1 and 2 students. It was established in 2003 to encourage an exploration of the arts, and allows students to work with practising artists in music, visual arts, dance and drama.

== Academic Information ==
Being an integrated secondary school, AMKSS offers three academic streams, namely the four-year Express course, as well as the Normal Course, comprising Normal (Academic) and Normal (Technical) academic tracks.

=== O Level Express Course ===
The Express Course is a nationwide four-year programme that leads up to the Singapore-Cambridge GCE Ordinary Level examination.

=== Normal Course ===
The Normal Course is a nationwide 4-year programme leading to the Singapore-Cambridge GCE Normal Level examination, which runs either the Normal (Academic) curriculum or Normal (Technical) curriculum, abbreviated as N(A) and N(T) respectively.

==== Normal (Academic) Course ====
In the Normal (Academic) course, students offer 5-8 subjects in the Singapore-Cambridge GCE Normal Level examination. Compulsory subjects include:

- English Language
- Mother Tongue Language
- Mathematics
- Combined Humanities

A 5th year leading to the Singapore-Cambridge GCE Ordinary Level examination is available to N(A) students who perform well in their Singapore-Cambridge GCE Normal Level examination. Students can move from one course to another based on their performance and the assessment of the school principal and teachers.

==== Normal (Technical) Course ====
The Normal (Technical) course prepares students for a technical-vocational education at the Institute of Technical Education. Students will offer 5-7 subjects in the Singapore-Cambridge GCE Normal Level examination. The curriculum is tailored towards strengthening students’ proficiency in English and Mathematics. Students take English Language, Mathematics, Basic Mother Tongue and Computer Applications as compulsory subjects.

== Co-curricular activities ==
The school offers a total of 19 extra-curricular activities, labelled as co-curricular activities (CCAs) by the Ministry of Education. These include sports, uniformed groups, performing arts and clubs. Several have been able to do well in outside competition and bring glory to the school.

The school's English drama club has been able to attain good results in the Singapore Youth Festival Arts Presentation, attaining Distinction and Accomplishment in the 2017 and 2015 competitions, and Silver in 2011 and 2013. Its table tennis team has also done very well, attaining the fourth place in the South School Interschool Table Tennis C Division in 2016 and 2017.

== Gastric Flu Incident ==
On 28 September 2006, 246 students and staff were on medical leave for vomiting, diarrhoea or nausea. Singapore's Public Utilities Board did a check on the school's water supply and confirmed it was not due to it. The principal had also closed the school canteen to eliminate the canteen as a source of food poisoning. The cause of the incident was later traced to gastric flu that spread through the school canteen. Checks by National Environmental Agency also revealed 'hygiene lapses'.

== See also ==
- Education in Singapore
