= World at Your Feet (TV series) =

- 球在你脚下
- Genre: Football; Family; Youth; Romance; Friendship; Dramedy
- Written by: Lau Ching Poon 刘清盆; Cynthia Chong Mei Ying 张湄纭; Lee Yen Chie 李燕淇; Thye En Miin 戴恩敏; Chen Siew Khoon 陈秀群; Lu Pei Yi 卢苏沛; Goh Chwee Chwee 吴翠翠
- Story by: Lau Ching Poon 刘清盆
- Directed by: Wong Foong Hwee 黄芬菲; Edmund Tse 谢益文; Leong Lye Lin 梁来玲; Zhang Hui Ying张慧盈; Jeff Lim 林明哲
- Starring: Ha Yu; Tay Ping Hui; Jeanette Aw; Elvin Ng; Zhang Zhenhuan; Yvonne Lim
- Opening theme: By A Dream (逐梦) by Power Station
- Ending theme: "I left sadness to myself" (把我的悲伤留给自己) by Bobby Chen "Easy to Say" by Beatbox Music "Tricking Time" by Beatbox Music (No commentaries for News Tonight)
- Country of origin: Singapore
- Original language: Mandarin
- No. of episodes: 30 (list of episodes)

Production
- Executive producer: Paul Yuen 袁树伟
- Producer: Winnie Wong 王尤红
- Cinematography: Tommy Lee 李兴顺
- Editor: Lai Chun Kwong 赖振江
- Running time: approx. 45 minutes

Original release
- Network: Mediacorp Channel 8
- Release: 14 May – 24 June 2014

Related
- Unexpected Strangers (小心陌生人)

World at Your Feet (球在你脚下) is a Singapore Mediacorp Channel 8 television series produced in 2014, which premiered on 14 May 2014 and ended on 24 June 2014. It stars Ha Yu, Tay Ping Hui, Jeanette Aw, Elvin Ng, Zhang Zhenhuan and Yvonne Lim as the main casts of the series. The show aired at 9pm on weekdays.

It revolves around the theme of football, as a lead-up to the 2014 FIFA World Cup held at Brazil.

== Plot ==
Mei Renxin was a celebrated football coach well known for his game strategies. However, after the sudden death of his wife, who had fainted in public without anyone assisting her, he became withdrawn and does not get along well with people and is very unapproachable. He could not forgive himself for neglecting and shortchanging her. Thereafter, he sank into oblivion and kept a distance from the sports arena.

The Mei family lives next door to the Mo family and are on bad terms as Renxin is unapproachable. He had several brushes with Mo Lihua, the second sister in the Mo family, over some petty matters. It came to the point where their neighbourly ties were soured. The feuding resulted in the enmity between the Mei and Mo families.

In his youth, Hong Canghai was high-spirited and a name to be reckoned with in football. His tricky “random kick” was a delight to watch. His forte was the penalty kick where he could send the ball to any point and even kick it straight into the goal. As his wife Zheng Yongyi cannot get along with his mother, Canghai has no choice but to move out. This leads to his younger brother, Hong Dehai, resenting him for abandoning their mother over a woman. They became estranged. Canghai has always been someone who values friendship. He never turns down anyone's request to borrow money from him. As a result of that, his wife is very unhappy with him. Seeing that he has achieved nothing, his career-minded wife decides to leave him. The couple have two sons, Hong Qian Feng and Hong Houwei, aged 11 and 10 respectively. After the separation, Yongyi gains custody of the two children. Canghai and his children are miserable over their situation. Canghai refuses to give up. He will do anything to bring his broken family back together again.

Wu Weixiong, a professional footballer, falls in love with Mo Yuqing at first sight. However, because Weixiong has an eye disease, he carries on an ambiguous relationship with Yuqing. Later, his role in an assault case discourages him from accepting Yuqing's love as he has made up his mind to turn himself in. However, Yuqing is adamant that Weixiong is avoiding her for reasons he will not disclose. In the end, he is forced to hit Yuqing to drive her away.

Ever since Lihua met Canghai, she is captivated by his manliness, and love for his children. She rents a room to Canghai in the hope of capturing his heart. Unfortunately for her, Canghai rejects her love as he still loves his wife.

After his release from jail, Weixiong's eye disease worsens and he avoids people by living on his own. One day, Yuqing chances to meet Weixiong, who is a guide of “Dialogue in Darkness” Experiential Walk. She finds out the truth and decides to help Weixiong brace up and make a comeback. But Yuqing, who has accepted Gao Guotian's love, is in a dilemma now.

Although Guotian is a gifted footballer, he faces objections from Gao Shou, his paternal uncle who has raised him, over a football career.

Guotian and Weixiong are good friends. One day, both of them got into a drunken stupor. Guotian injured someone in his bid to save him. To protect himself, he bribes the witness, Ann, to frame the miserable Weixiong. Weixiong, who is in the dark, chooses to turn himself in. Guotian pleads with him against doing so, yet is afraid to tell him the truth. He feels distressed.

Guotian is in love with Yuqing and stands by her. His constant encouragement and assistance finally moves Yuqing into accepting his love. However, Guotian is perfectly aware that their relationship rests on a time bomb that will go off anytime...

Gao Shou, too, was a professional footballer when he was young. He gave up his dream for the sake of his career, and became a successful businessman. Ye Laixiang was a waitress but worked very hard to get close to Gao Shou to become his assistant. Although she knows that he is married with Qifang, she continues to have feelings for him. It leads to a hopeless relationship with no end in sight, but gives a boost to her relationship with Renxin.

Mo Shijing, the eldest son of the Mo family, has incredible arm strength. Unfortunately, he is a bum addicted to gambling. He and Lan Yangyang, Renxin's brother-in-law, are colleagues in a warehouse. In his youth, he fathered an illegitimate son, Liao Huancong, without knowing it. He thought that the other party, Xiuhe, had the child with another man. It was only after Xiuhe revealed the truth on her deathbed that he came to his senses. Henceforth, he turned over a new leaf for Huancong.

Yangyang is Renxin's brother-in-law. He is languid by nature and does everything by foot instead of using his hands. This turns out to be a boon because it actually trains him to develop a set of skills using his feet. Yangyang, a former columnist, is a man of emotions. He falls for Yuqing but after being spurned by her, turns his attention to her elder sister, Lihua, creating some funny episodes in the process.

Wang Jiannan is the teammate of Canghai, Weixiong and Guotian. He requires a huge sum of money for medical treatment for his younger sister who is suffering from a serious illness.

This bunch of desperate people with a common passion for football decide to participate in a street football tournament that comes with a generous prize. But they are thrashed soundly in their first match. At the critical juncture, Renxin finally shows his prowess. Only then does everyone know that he is someone to be reckoned with. Thereafter, under Renxin's coaching, the team surprisingly scores a victory and goes on to win match after match.

Meanwhile, Dehai, Huancong, Fang Yangming and a few other young men form “Peaks Team” so that Renxin's “Fire Team” cannot steal the limelight. This group of boys whose future seems uncertain are not exactly enthusiastic initially about participating in the tournament. Later, with encouragement from Yangming, who is afflicted with an incurable illness, they decide to take the tournament seriously in order to score a personal triumph as the boys feel that they have never won any prizes in their lives before.

The “Fire Team” of men past their prime and the “Peaks Team” of young men vie for the trophy. The two teams start out as rivals who are uncompromising but end up as friends who appreciate one other. Faced with a common enemy subsequently, the Mei and Mo families discard their animosity to join hands in forming the “Brave Lions Team” to defeat the mighty Hong Kong team.

Renxin is the captain of the Singapore team. Whether this group of people will turn their lives around and make a comeback or not, one can only hear him shouting fervently on the sideline: “Don’t give up! The world is at your feet!”

== Cast ==
=== Main cast ===
- Ha Yu as 梅仁信 (Mei Renxin), Coach of the Fire team
- Tay Ping Hui as 洪沧海 (Hong Canghai), Zheng Yongyi's husband, Coach and team member of the Peaks team
- Jeanette Aw as 莫雨晴 (Mo Yuqing), Mo Guojia's youngest daughter and a medic
- Elvin Ng as 吴伟雄 (Wu Weixiong), Wu Shengda's son and a professional footballer
- Zhang Zhenhuan as 高过天 (Gao Guotian), Gao Shou and Qifang's nephew and team member of the Fire team
- Yvonne Lim as 郑永仪 (Zheng Yongyi), Hong Canghai's wife
- Vivian Lai as 莫丽花 (Mo Lihua), Mo Guojia's eldest daughter and laksa eatery owner
- Zheng Geping as 高首 (Gao Shou), Chen Qifang's husband and team member of the Fire team
- Aileen Tan as 叶来香 (Ye Laixiang), Ye Xiaofeng's elder sister
- Brandon Wong as 莫世敬 (Mo Shijing), team member of the Fire team
- Dennis Chew as 蓝阳阳 (Lan Yangyang), Lan Yaxin's younger brother and team member of the Fire team
- Xu Bin as 廖焕聪 (Liao Huancong), Mo Shijing and Xiuhe's son, a polytechnic student and team member of the Peaks team
- Ian Fang as 洪德海 (Hong Dehai), Hong Canghai's younger brother, a polytechnic student and a team member of the Peaks team
- Aloysius Pang as 方扬名 (Fang Yangming), team member of the Peaks team
- Zhang Wei 张为 as Mo Guojia 莫国佳
- Zhu Xiufeng as 海妈, the Hongs' mother
- Ivan Lo 卢楷浚 as Hong Qianfeng 洪前锋, Hong Canghai and Zheng Yongyi's eldest son
- Tan Jun Sheng 陈俊生 as Hong Houwei 洪厚卫, Hong Canghai and Zheng Yongyi's youngest son
- Richard Low as Wu Shengda 吴升达, Wu Weixiong's father
- Chen Huihui as Chen Qifang 陈琦芳, Gao Shou's wife
- Kimberly Chia as Ye Xiaofeng 叶晓凤, a polytechnic student who is Hong Dehai's girlfriend
- Douglas Kung 孔祥德 as Wang Jiannan 王建南
- Kelvin Mun 文兆保 as Ma Guangzong 马光宗, a polytechnic student who plays in the Peaks team
- KK Cheung 张国强 as Li Daoqiang 李道强, a celebrity football player of a Hong Kong football team
- Chantalle Ng as Li Siqiang 李思蔷 who works for Mo Lihua
- Jeremy Chan as Alex Lim, a member of the Black Panther football team
- Wang Yuqing as Huang Furen 黄富仁, the manager of the Fire Fox team
- Silver Ang 洪子惠 as Ann, Hong Canghai's colleague
- Tan Jia Hui 陈佳慧 as Jac
- Ivan Tan 陈永文 as 阿宝
- Louis Wu 伍洛毅 as Mark, Zheng Yongyi's colleague
- Veracia Yong 雍可欣 as May
- Haden Hee 许立楷 as Ben

=== Special appearances ===
Tosh Zhang, Wang Weiliang, Maxi Lim, Noah Yap and Charlie Goh appeared as Lim's friends and helpers who worked for Lim's father. The Minister for Culture, Community and Youth Lawrence Wong appeared as himself as a Guest-of-honour at the football competition. Former Singaporean footballer Quah Kim Song appeared as Guest-of-honour and the prize presenter at the 2012 Dragon King Cup. Radio disc jockey Ho Ai Ling 何爱玲 appeared as a reporter and former beauty pageant winner, Teo Ser Lee 张思丽, as Xiuhe's younger sister, Xiuhuan 秀环.

== Spin-off ==
A spin-off telemovie titled Unexpected Strangers (小心陌生人) was later produced whereby only Jeanette Aw, Elvin Ng, Zhang Zhenhuan and Richard Low reprised their roles, and was joined by new cast members Jayley Woo and Allen Chen.

== Accolades ==
Award	Year	Category	Nominee(s)	Result	Ref
Star Awards	2015	Young Talent Award	Ivan Lo	Nominated	
Star Awards	2015	Best Theme Song	"逐梦" by Power Station	Nominated	
Star Awards	2015	Best Director	Wong Foong Hwee	Nominated	
Star Awards	2015	Best Costume and Image Design	Justin Lee Zhen An	Nominated	
Star Awards	2015	Best Cameraman for Drama Programme	Tommy Lee	Nominated	
Star Awards	2015	Best Music and Sound Design	Zheng Kai Hua and Thong Meng Sum	Nominated	
Star Awards	2015	Best Actress	Yvonne Lim	Nominated	
Star Awards	2015	Favourite Male Character	Aloysius Pang	Nominated	
Star Awards	2015	Favourite Male Character	Elvin Ng	Nominated	
Star Awards	2015	Favourite Male Character	Zhang Zhenhuan	Won	
Star Awards	2015	Favourite Female Character	Kimberly Chia	Nominated	
Star Awards	2015	Favourite Onscreen Couple (Drama)	Zhang Zhenhuan and Jeanette Aw	Won	
Star Awards	2015	Favourite Onscreen Couple (Drama)	Ian Fang and Kimberly Chia	Nominated	
