= Joshua Ang =

Singaporean actor

- Born: Joshua Ang Ser Kian; 1 March 1989 (age 37); Singapore
- Other name: Nutzhen
- Education: Pasir Ris Secondary School
- Occupation: Actor
- Years active: 2002–present
- Spouse: Shannon Low (m. 2018–2021)
- Partner: Catherine Kew (2021–present)
- Children: 2

Chinese name
- Traditional Chinese: 洪賜健
- Simplified Chinese: 洪赐健
Transcriptions
Standard Mandarin
- Hanyu Pinyin: Hóng Cìjiàn
Yue: Cantonese
- Jyutping: hong2 ci4 kin4
Southern Min
- Hokkien POJ: Âng Sù-kiān
- Website: Official website

Joshua Ang Ser Kian (simplified Chinese: 洪赐健; traditional Chinese: 洪賜健; pinyin: Hóng Cìjiàn; born 1 March 1989) is a former Mediacorp artist from Singapore who starred alongside Shawn Lee in the film I Not Stupid and its sequel I Not Stupid Too.

== Career ==
Ang began acting in 2001 and was one of four child actors who were cast by Jack Neo and his team in the box office hit I Not Stupid. He was then cast in Homerun in the following year, another successful film by Neo. Ang soon rose to stardom and was cast in more films, including Nobody's Child and I Not Stupid Too. In 2008, after completing his National service, Ang signed a contract with Mediacorp as a full-time artiste. Ang also starred in Mediacorp Channel 8's 180 episode drama, Your Hand in Mine.

On 15 July 2010, Ang announced that he would not be renewing his contract with Mediacorp to spend more time on his new startup, a recycling business, and with his family.

In 2012, Joshua founded the online humour TV channel Reelity TV. He made a brief return to television in Unriddle 2 to reprise his role as Liu Shisan and in films We Not Naughty and Timeless Love.

== Personal life ==
Ang attended Pasir Ris Secondary School. After completing his O Levels, he served out his National Service before joining Mediacorp on a full-time contract.

On 3 March 2018, Ang married Shannon Low, an air stewardess whom he met in 2010 while studying part-time for a Banking and Finance degree at Murdoch University. Their son, Jedaiah Leonhart was born on 1 August 2018. On 14 December 2020, Ang announced on his Instagram account that he decided to divorce Low without revealing the actual reason, and later specifying the divorce would be formalised in March 2021 when they are legally allowed to do so. After the news of the divorce came to public attention, both Ang and Low indicated that they would be taking legal actions against each other for allegations that they had raised of each other on their social media accounts.

In August 2021, Ang welcomed his second child, whom he fathered with Catherine Kew, a property agent.

== Filmography ==
=== Television ===
Year	Title	Role	Notes	Ref.
2002	I Not Stupid	Ang Boon Hock (洪文福)		
2006	I Not Stupid Too	Lim Chengcai (林成才)		
2008	Crime Busters x 2	Xiaogou (小狗)	Cameo	
2009	Your Hand In Mine	Gao Yongjun (高勇俊)		
2009	Table of Glory	He Shengwu (何胜武)		
2010	Unriddle	Liu Shisan (刘拾叁)		
2010	New Beginnings	Cai Shicai (蔡施才)		
2011	A Tale of 2 Cities	Qian Wenlong		
2012	Unriddle 2	Liu Shisan (刘拾叁)		

=== Films ===
Year	Title	Role	Notes	Ref.
2002	I Not Stupid	Ang Boon Hock (洪文福)		
2003	Homerun	Tan Beng Soon (陈明顺)		
2004	Nobody's Child	Wei (伟哥)		
2006	I Not Stupid Too	Lim Chengcai (林成才)		
2008	Missing You...	Qiang		
2012	Timeless Love	Eden		
2012	We Not Naughty	Damien Lau Jianren		
2021	The Diam Diam Era Two	Yao Dong		

== Awards and nominations ==
Year	Awards	Category	Nominated work	Result	Ref.
2002	Star Awards	Young Talent Award	I Not Stupid (as Ang Boon Hock)	Nominated	
2010	Star Awards	Top 10 Most Popular Male Artistes	—N/a	Nominated	
