= Tampines Meridian Junior College =

College in Singapore founded 2018

Coordinates: 1.3764°N 103.9375°E

Tampines Meridian Junior College 淡滨尼美廉初级学院 Maktab Rendah Tampines Meridian தெம்பனிஸ் மெரிடியன் தொடக்கக் கல்லூரி
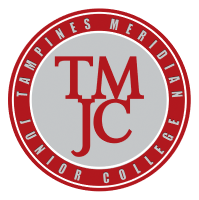
- 21 Pasir Ris Street 71, Singapore 518799

Information
- Former name: Tampines Junior College; Meridian Junior College
- School type: Government, Co-Educational
- Established: 15 November 2018; 7 years ago
- Session: Single
- School code: 0717
- Principal: Mr Sin Kim Ho
- Song: Hearts and Minds Inspired
- Website: https://tmjc.moe.edu.sg

Tampines Meridian Junior College (TMJC) is a junior college in Singapore, founded in 2018, offering two-year pre-university courses leading up to the Singapore-Cambridge GCE Advanced Level examination. It was founded after the merger of Tampines Junior College and Meridian Junior College, which was prompted by a decrease in student enrolment.

== History ==
In 2017, Singapore's Ministry of Education (MOE) announced a merging exercise of various schools in view of the declining birth rate in Singapore. Enrolments were predicted to fall to as low as 200 to 300 students at some junior colleges within a few years. Also included in this exercise were seven pairs of primary schools and three pairs of secondary schools. Tampines Junior College (founded 1986) and Meridian Junior College (founded 2003) were among the eight junior colleges selected for the merging exercise.

The new names of the four new junior colleges were formally made known in January 2018. They adopted a combination of the full names of both colleges, with the name of the older college coming first. The college thus received the name Tampines Meridian Junior College (TMJC), with its campus taking over the facilities at the Meridian Junior College campus.

TMJC started work on the merger in 2018, and formally started operations on 7 January 2019, with the lowering of the flags of its predecessors and the raising of the TMJC flag. Bonding activities for students and teachers were conducted the same day.

The college anthem, which was composed by Tampines Junior College alumni Joel Nah, was composed over the course of 2019 and presented to the students and staff on two occasions towards the end of the academic year.

In January 2021, TMJC held its first virtual open house in place of a regular one due to the COVID-19 pandemic.

== Principals ==
The first principal of TMJC, Ms Pamela Yoong, was also the sixth and final principal of TPJC prior to the merger.

Name	Period Served
Ms. Pamela Yoong	2019–2022
Mr. Sin Kim Ho	2023–present

== Identity ==
Students of TMJC are usually referred to as "TMJCians" or "Tampines Meridians".

=== Crest ===
The circular shape represents TMJC's commitment to provide an all-rounded, holistic and rich education. Red represents courage, resilience and care, while silver represents integrity. The bold letters spelling the college's initials represent the college's clarity of purpose and steadfast determination to always strive to be better.

=== Uniform ===
The uniform was selected from four proposed colour schemes, with a neutral design of white and khaki being selected.

=== House System ===
During internal sports competitions in the college, the college's sports houses would be ranked against each other, with prizes for the top house. The house crests were unveiled on 12 July 2019 as part of a college celebratory event. The five houses of TMJC are as follows:

- Aquila (Red, Eagle)
- Corvus (Blue, Raven)
- Cygnus (White, Swan)
- Draco (Grey, Dragon)
- Pavo (Pink, Peacock)

== Campus ==
TMJC's campus is located at the former MJC campus at Pasir Ris Street 71, retaining the original colour scheme of white, blue and orange.

TMJC's field and running track are open for public use on weekends. TMJC's canteen, which also serves as a multi-purpose hall, is the only air-conditioned junior college canteen in Singapore.

Outside the lecture theatres is a heritage gallery opened in 2018 to commemorate the histories of TPJC and MJC in light of the merger.

Under the JC Rejuvenation Programme as planned by the MOE, TMJC's campus will be upgraded in its second phase by 2030.

== Academic Information ==
The list of content-based subjects offered by TMJC for the GCE A-Levels is as follows:

Content-based H2 Subjects	Content-based H1 Subjects
Art	Art
Biology	Biology
Chemistry	Chemistry
Physics	Physics
Economics	Economics
English Literature	English Literature
Geography	Geography
History	History
Mathematics	Mathematics
Further Mathematics	
Chinese Language and Literature (CLL)	
Malay Language and Literature	
Tamil Language and Literature	
Theatre Studies & Drama	

=== Malay Language Elective Programme (MLEP) ===
TMJC is one of five junior colleges offering the MLEP. All students who enrol in this programme are required to take H2 MLL at the A-Levels.

=== Theatre Studies and Drama Elective Programme ===
TMJC offers the Theatre Studies and Drama Elective Programme, which was originally offered in TPJC from 2007 to before the merger. All students who enrol in this programme in TMJC are required to take H2 TSD at the A-Levels. Lecture Theatre 3 is the dedicated performance lab used by TSD students.

== Co-Curricular Activities ==
A total of 30 CCAs including Students' Council are offered in TMJC. Students normally take part in one CCA. The list of CCAs offered at TMJC is as follows:

Sports and Games	Performing Arts	Clubs and Societies
Archery	Chinese Orchestra	Culture Promotion Club
Badminton	Choir	Debating and Public Speaking
Basketball	English Drama	Interact Club
Floorball	Guitar Ensemble	Interactive Games Club
Football	Modern Dance	Makers' Club
Health and Fitness	Symphonic Band	Media Resource Club
Netball		Photography Club
Outdoor Activities Club (ODAC)		Students' Council
Paddlers		
Rockwall Climbing		
Shooting		
Squash		
Table Tennis		
Taekwondo		
Volleyball		
Wushu		
