= Don't Stop Believin' (TV series) =

- 我们等你!
- Genre: Drama; Romance; School; Youth; Education
- Created by: Lau Ching Poon 刘清盆
- Written by: Lau Ching Poon 刘清盆; Cynthia Chong 张湄纭
- Directed by: Leong Lye Lin 梁来玲; Foo Seng Peng 符之炳; Lim Bee Nah 林美娜
- Starring: Felicia Chin; Elvin Ng; Romeo Tan; Edwin Goh; Kimberly Chia; Ian Fang; Xu Bin
- Opening theme: 《真善美》 by Tay Kewei & Wei En
- Ending theme: 《桃李》 by Foo Jierong
- Country of origin: Singapore
- Original language: Chinese
- No. of episodes: 20

Production
- Producer: Soh Bee Lian 苏美莲
- Running time: 1 hour

Original release
- Network: MediaCorp Channel 8
- Release: 14 August – 10 September 2012

Related
- Life - Fear Not (2015-2016); My School Daze (2009); Jump! (2012); While We Are Young (2017)

Don't Stop Believin' (Chinese: 我们等你!) is a Singaporean Chinese drama which was telecast on Singapore's free-to-air channel, MediaCorp Channel 8. It made its debut on 14 August 2012. This drama serial consists of 20 episodes and was screened on weekdays at 9:00 pm. It stars Felicia Chin, Elvin Ng, Romeo Tan, Edwin Goh, Kimberly Chia, Ian Fang & Xu Bin as the casts of this series.

== Plot ==
Du Siman is a passionate teacher of a top school. After clashing with the principal over a student, she decides to join Brilliante Secondary School, the school with the worst academic results in Singapore as it accepts pupils who have failed the Primary School Leaving Examinations at least twice. Through sheer determination, she manages to convince the principal, Zhou Yaoguang and vice principal Li Shengchun, to recruit her. Unfortunately, Siman's first day at the school turns out disastrous.

Wu Yanbin is a counselor in the school. Initially, Siman was furious with Yanbin after he did not respond to her calls for help when she was locked inside a recreation room. He even seemingly rejects Siman's profession of love for him. However, her stance towards him softened after she found out that Yanbin suffers from frequent bouts of sudden deafness.

In Siman's class is a student by the name of Bai Zhixiang. If not for a home visit, she will not have believed that in a prosperous First World country like Singapore, there exists such a poor family who not only cannot pay their utility bills, they do not even have gas at home. Then there is another student Cai Wensheng who is studying, and working at the same time to support the family at such a tender age because his father, Tianshi, is mentally unwell. Emotions well up when Siman and the new volunteer teacher Angel see these students rushing off to work right after school.

Zhong Guo'an is the disciplinary master of the school. In front of the whole school, he canes Junliang who is involved in a case where a female student, Jessie is molested. Feeling maligned, the indignant Junliang throws a bag of urine at Jessie sneakily. Unfortunately, Guo'an slips and is rendered paralysed as a result. Full of guilt, Junliang wants to visit Guo'an in hospital but is stopped by Yaoguang. Out of guilt, he protests about not being allowed to see his own father.

Zhixiang has his first taste of love when he falls for a classmate, Yilin, who rejects him. Yilin confides in Yanbin every now and then. Once, when Yilin suffers a nosebleed, Yanbin carefully helps her to stop the bleeding. The young girl somehow develops feelings for him despite knowing that Yanbin is in love with someone else.

Jin Zhengnan, Yanbin's good friend, is fond of Siman after meeting her for the time. To get close to her, he volunteers to conduct a bakery class for the students of Brilliante Secondary School. Siman's heart, however, is with Yanbin. Once, Siman sums up her courage to express her feelings for Yanbin. Unfortunately, Yanbin's hearing defect leads to Siman mistaking him for rejecting her love. Disappointed, Siman finally gives in to Zhengnan's wooing.

Siman and Yanbin take the students on an overseas tour. They find out unexpectedly that Yilin is suffering from a terminal illness. In fact, Yilin knows about it all along but chooses to hide the truth from her teachers and classmates. As her condition worsens, she is unable to participate in the culinary competition organized by the TV station. She can only hope that her teammates will fulfill her wish.

Alex, a problem student who bears a grudge against Yanbin for punishing him, threatens another student into accusing Yanbin of molestation. He even trumps up a load of evidence and produces false witnesses, leaving Yanbin defenceless. In view of the damning evidence, the school board unanimously decides to fire Yanbin. Yaoguang goes all out to defend Yanbin, and makes up his mind to pursue the matter with him. He vows to resign as Principal if Yanbin is dismissed from his job. Siman is roused to join their camp.

== Cast ==
=== Teachers ===
- Felicia Chin as Du Siman 杜思曼, a teacher at Brilliante
- Elvin Ng as Wu Yanbin 吴彦彬, a teacher at Brilliante
- Romeo Tan as Jin Zhengnan 金正南, a teacher at Brilliante
- Cavin Soh as Zhou Yaoguang 周耀光, the principal of Brilliante
- Constance Song as Li Shenchun 李圣春, the vice-principal of Brilliante
- Brandon Wong as Zhong Guo An 钟国安, the discipline master of Brilliante
- Ben Yeo as Cui Dabao 崔大保, a teacher at Brilliante
- Tang Ling Yi as Angel, a teacher at Brilliante
- Zhang Wei as Uncle Lim, a cleaner at Brilliante

=== Students ===
- Edwin Goh as Cai Wensheng 蔡文胜
- Kimberly Chia as Deng Yilin 邓怡琳
- Ian Fang as Bai Zhixiang 白志翔
- Xu Bin as Zhong Junliang 钟俊良

Cast	Role	Description
Phua Yida	Wu Qinghua 吴清华	A student who worships Junliang.
Shelia Tan	Jessie	The class representative. She once did not want to go to school because she thought that she had no friends in school and she had been molested. Has a crush on Junliang.
Ang Ching Hui	Chen Xiaohe 筱禾	A student who is a slow-learner.
Scott C. Hillyard	Zheng Lida 郑立达	A student.
Xavier Ong 王胜宇	Alex	Main Villain of the Drama The most rebellious student in school. However, his results are better than the other students. He stays with his abusive mother.

=== Parents / Other cast ===
Cast	Role	Description
May Phua	Wang Lihong 王丽虹	She is Chen Xiaohe's mother and is also Yaoguang's ex-fiancée.
Teo Ser Lee	Anita	Yaoguang's elder sister and Angel's mother.
Silver Ang	Irene	Anita's newly hired maid in episode 4

=== Du Siman's Family ===
Cast	Role	Description
Li Wenhai 李文海	Du Qiucheng 杜秋成	Siman and Siwei's parents
林倩如	Feng Yun 凤云	Siman and Siwei's parents
Shane Pow 包勋评	Du Siwei 杜思维	Du Siman younger brother.

=== Cai Wensheng's Family ===
Cast	Role	Description
Wang Yuqing 王昱清	Cai Weifeng 蔡威风	Cai Wensheng's father.
Edwin Goh 吴劲威	Cai Wensheng 蔡文胜	The student with the worst academic result at Brilliante. He has to study and work at the same time to support his father Has a crush on Deng Yilin.

=== Deng Yilin's Family ===
Cast	Role	Description
Huang Shinan	Ken	Yilin's father

== Production ==
Filming for Don't Stop Believin' started on 10 May 2012 and ended on 16 July 2012. The school scenes would be filmed at East Coast Primary School and the production studio. Out-of-studio filmed scenes included locations like NEX, City Square Mall, Punggol, Serangoon, Bishan and Sentosa.

Producer Soh Bee Lian said that there might be a sequel to Don't Stop Believin', though this sequel would involve a new cast and would take some time to produce. The sequel may replace Unriddle 2 in having a third instalment.

== Reception ==
Don't Stop Believin' was well received by Singaporean viewers. It was the most-watched television drama of 2012 in Singapore, garnering an average viewership of 919,000 over its 20 episodes. Although its debut episode garnered only 852,000 viewers, the drama's last episode was attracted a total of 1,047,800 viewers, beating the previous viewership record of 993,000 viewers set by the period drama Joys of Life.

A review in The Straits Times described this drama as "refreshing". It also praised "the energy of the young cast", who "makes the drama more enjoyable than you expect it to be". However, it added that "At second sight, Channel 8 touches, such as repetitive lines and ideas, are more apparent". Overall, the newspaper gave this television drama a rating of 3 out of 5 stars.

== Awards and nominations ==
Date	Award	Category	Nominee / Work	Result	Ref
2013	Star Awards	Best Theme Song	"真善美"	Nominated	
2013	Star Awards	Best Screenplay	Lau Ching Poon 刘清盆 Cynthia Chong Mei Ying 张湄纭	Won	
2013	Star Awards	Favourite Male Character	Xu Bin	Won	
2013	Star Awards	Favourite Female Character	Kimberly Chia	Nominated	
2013	Star Awards	Favourite Female Character	Felicia Chin	Nominated	
2013	Star Awards	Top Rated Drama Serial 2012 最高收视率电视剧 2012	—N/a	Won	
2013	Star Awards	Rocket Award	Ian Fang	Nominated	
2013	Star Awards	Best Newcomer	Ian Fang	Won	
2013	Star Awards	Best Newcomer	Edwin Goh	Nominated	
2013	Star Awards	Best Supporting Actress	Constance Song	Nominated	
2013	Star Awards	Best Drama Serial	—N/a	Nominated	
2015	PPCTV MediaCorp Awards 2015	Favourite Female TV Character	Felicia Chin	Nominated	
2015	PPCTV MediaCorp Awards 2015	Favourite On-Screen Couple	Elvin Ng and Felicia Chin	Nominated	

== See also ==
- List of programmes broadcast by Mediacorp Channel 8
- List of Don't Stop Believin' episodes
