= Nobody's Children =

Nobody's Children may refer to:

== Film and television ==
- Nobody's Children (1920 film), an American film directed by Richard Maurice
- Nobody's Children (1940 film), an American film directed by Charles Barton
- Nobody's Children (1951 film), a French-Italian film directed by Raffaello Matarazzo
- Nobody's Children (1952 film), a Mexican crime drama film
- Nobody's Children (1994 film), an American television film directed by David Wheatley

== Other media ==
- Nobody's Children (novella), a 2007 Dr. Who novella
- Nobody's Children, a 2015 box set by Tom Petty and the Heartbreakers

== See also ==
- Nobody's Child (disambiguation)
