= Say Cheese (TV series) =

Singaporean Chinese drama

- 西瓜甜不甜
- Genre: Family; Drama; National Day
- Written by: Rebecca Leow 洪汐
- Directed by: Chen Yi You 陈忆幼; Chew Fatt Yeow 周发耀
- Starring: Chen Liping; Richard Low; Joanne Peh; Romeo Tan; Hong Huifang; Cynthia Koh; Rayson Tan; Zen Chong; Zong Zijie; Kimberly Chia; Denise Camillia; Jeffrey Cheng 庄惟翔; Lin Meijiao
- Opening theme: 喜剧收场 by Jack Neo
- Country of origin: Singapore
- Original language: Chinese
- No. of episodes: 20

Production
- Executive producer: Winnie Wong 王尤红
- Producer: Mediacorp Studios
- Production location: Singapore
- Running time: approx. 45 minutes (excluding advertisements)

Original release
- Network: Mediacorp Channel 8
- Release: 6 August – 31 August 2018

Related
- Gifted; 29th February

Say Cheese (Chinese: 西瓜甜不甜) was a Singaporean drama produced by Mediacorp Studios and telecast on Mediacorp Channel 8. It consisted of 20 episodes and was aired at 9 pm on weekdays and had a repeat telecast at 8 am the following day.

== Synopsis ==
Peace Photography Studio is an established but traditional studio founded 80 years ago and had five branches in its heyday. Now, there is only a single studio left and is managed by Pan Renyi and daughter Pan Zejia. Pan Zejia quietly helped out at the studio as she feels indebted to Pan Renyi who helped her settle a huge debt 10 years ago, and as a result, she remained single since then.

Ke Yuanhang is a newspaper reporter who is kind and magnanimous, although five years younger than Pan Zejia, a friendship soon developed. While Pan Zejia is irritable and impatient, Ke Yuanhang is gentle and caring. Their hindrances do not stop there, as Pan Renyi is constantly at loggerheads with Ke Yuanhang's mother, Hong Ziyi. Due to Pan Renyi's temperament, he does not get along with all his children. The matter is made worse when Pan Zejia's mother suddenly dies in a car accident.

== Cast ==
- Chen Liping as Hong Ziyi (洪紫怡)
- Romeo Tan as Ke Yuanhang (柯远航)
- Richard Low as Pan Renyi 潘仁义, a photographer who is the owner of Ho Peng Photography Studio
  - Cruz Tay (郑凯泽) as a young Pan
- Hong Huifang as Huang Ruiyun 黄瑞云, Pan Renyi's wife and the co-owner of Ho Peng Photography Studio
- Rayson Tan as Zhong Kelin 钟克林, an artist
- Cynthia Koh as Pan Zeguo 潘泽国, an art gallery boss
- Zen Chong as Pan Zemin 潘泽民, a fashion designer
- Joanne Peh as Pan Zejia 潘泽家, Ho Peng Photography Studio's employee and restaurant employee
- Zong Zijie as Zhong Bowen 钟博文, Zhong Kelin and Pan Zeguo's son, a photography and digital imaging graduate from Nanyang Technological University
- Lyn Oh 胡菱恩 as Pan Sushan 潘苏姗, Pan Zemin's daughter and a blogger
- Kimberly Chia as Ni Yuyan 倪语妍, a fashion model
- Denise Camillia as Elaine Lim 林依莲, a restaurant manager
- Jeffrey Cheng 庄惟翔 as Chi Yongliang 池永亮, a restaurant secretary
- Lin Meijiao as Aisha 爱沙, a school food stall's owner

Cast	Role	Description
Suhaimi Yusof	Kaamil	A school food stall's owner; Aisha's husband
Nick Shen	Pan Heping 潘贺评	Ho Peng Photography Studio's owner (1st generation); Pan Renyi's father; Huang Ruiyun's father-in-law; Pan Zeguo, Pan Zemin and Pan Zejia's grandfather; Zhong Bowen and Pan Sushan's great grandfather
Candyce Toh 杜蕙甹	Ding Xiaorou 丁晓柔	Main Villain: A hairdresser; Zhong Kelin's mistress
Bernard Tan 陈传之	Ni Haoxiong 倪浩雄	
Tang Maoling 湯妙玲		Mrs Ni (倪太太)
Marcus Chin	Uncle Stone 石头叔	Pan Renyi's old friend
Angel Lim 林汐		
Kenneth Kong 江坚文		
Seth Ang 翁兴昂		
Benjamin Tan 陈俊铭	James	
Zhai Siming	Brandon	
Eelyn Kok		

== Soundtrack ==
Song title	Song type	Singer	Lyrics	Composer	Producer
喜剧收场	Theme song	Jack Neo 梁智强	Jack Neo 梁智强	邓碧源	王尤红 麦如丽
忘年	Sub-theme song	Joanne Peh 白微秀	黎沸挥	邓碧源	王尤红 麦如丽

== Accolades ==
Organisation	Year	Nominees	Category	Result	Ref
Asian Academy Creative Awards	2019	Cynthia Koh	Best Supporting Actress	Won	
Star Awards	2019	Rebecca Leow	Best Screenplay	Nominated	
Star Awards	2019	Joanne Peh	Best Actress	Nominated	
Star Awards	2019	Cynthia Koh	Best Supporting Actress	Nominated	
Star Awards	2019	—N/a	Best Drama Serial	Nominated	

== See also ==
- List of MediaCorp Channel 8 Chinese drama series (2010s)
