= Tampines Secondary School =

- 淡滨尼中学; Sekolah Menengah Tampines

Location
- 252 Tampines Street 12, Singapore 529427
- Coordinates: 51.2763°N 30.2219°E

Information
- Type: Government
- Motto: Betterment of Self for Society
- Established: 2 January 1986; 40 years ago
- Session: Single session
- School code: 3037
- Principal: Lan Mingjun
- Enrolment: Approximately 1400
- Colour: Green Gold
- Website: tampinessec.moe.edu.sg

Tampines Secondary School (TPSS) is a co-educational government secondary school in Tampines, Singapore. It shares the same campus as Tampines Primary School even though the two schools are not affiliated.

== History ==
Tampines Secondary School opened in 1986. In its first year, classes functioned at Pasir Ris Secondary School as the school building was still under construction, and was later occupied by Tampines Junior College until December 1986. It was officially opened in 1988. In 2008, it shifted to a holding site in Bedok South Road and moved back to Tampines Street 12 in March 2010, under the Ministry of Education's PRIME upgrading programme.

In 2026, Tampines Secondary celebrated its 40th anniversary consisting of performance from their chorale, english drama, dance dynamics and many others.

== Identity and culture ==
The school crest consists of a 'T' and 'S', with the 'S' resembling a stream. The 'T' represents the school's name as well as the Tampines tree, and the 'S' represents the students who have just joined the school and are working their way towards success.

== Facilities ==
Tampines Secondary School shares a main building with Tampines Primary School.

== Co-curricular activities ==
The school offers 20 extra-curricular activities, labelled as co-curricular activities (CCAs) by the Ministry of Education. These include sports, uniformed groups, performing arts, clubs and societies.
