= Margaret Read (anthropologist) =

English social anthropologist and colonial educationist

Margaret Helen Read
- Born: 5 August 1889
- Died: 19 May 1991 (aged 101)
- Education: Newnham College, Cambridge; London School of Economics
- Occupations: Social anthropologist and academic
- Awards: Commander of the Order of the British Empire

Margaret Helen Read, CBE (5 August 1889 – 19 May 1991) was a British social anthropologist and academic, who specialised in colonial education. She was one of the first researchers to apply social anthropology and ethnography principles to the education and health problems of people living in the British colonies.

== Life and work ==
Read was born on 5 August 1889 in Battersea Rise, London, England, to Mabyn Read, a medical doctor, and Isabel Lawford. She was educated at Roedean School, an all-girls private school near Brighton. She studied history at Newnham College, Cambridge from 1908 to 1911, although women were not permitted to graduate with degrees from the University of Cambridge at that time. She then undertook a one-year diploma in geography at Newnham. Read never married, but had been engaged to a man who went on to be killed during the First World War.

Between 1919 and 1924, Read undertook her first social work missions to Indian hill villages. On a break from her job at the Young Women's Christian Association (YWCA) in Kolkata, India, she joined two other young women to travel from Kalimpong in West Bengal, to Sikkim in northeast India. For making this trip, she was named a "Modern Girl" by author Margaret Allen.

Until 1930, Read also took on lecturing opportunities in Britain and the United States on subjects related to international affairs. In the 1930s, Read attended the London School of Economics (LSE), to study anthropology which included ethnographic field research in Africa, including Northern Rhodesia (now Zambia) and Nyasaland (now Malawi). In 1934, Read was awarded her Doctor of Philosophy (PhD) degree at LSE for a thesis titled "Primitive economics with special reference to culture contact".

From 1937 to 1940, Read was an assistant lecturer at LSE. From 1940 to 1945, she served as temporary head of the Colonial Department of the Institute of Education, University of London, having been selected by Sir Fred Clarke. Following the end of the Second World War in 1945, she continued in the role on a permanent basis and was made a reader. She co-wrote one of her early reports of the newly appointed Freda Gwilliam about the education of women and girls education in Nyasaland.

In 1949, Read was awarded a chair as Professor of Education "with special reference to colonial areas".

Read was associated with the Colonial Office of the British Government: she acted as an advisor on education policy in the colonies, and she was the British delegate to the UNESCO General Conferences of 1946 and 1947. Read was influential in shaping the British Government's attitude to post-war colonial education. After retiring in 1955, she became a consultant, notably for the World Health Organisation (WHO), and also became a visiting professor in Nigeria and the United States.

Read died on 19 May 1991.

== Selected works ==
- Read, Margaret (1931). The Indian peasant uprooted: a study of the human machine. London: Longmans, Green & Co.
- Read, Margaret (1953). Africans and Their Schools. London: Longmans, Green & Co.

== Collections ==
The Institute of Education (IOE), University College London holds Read's archive. The collection contains travel diaries from the 1940s onwards, photographs, drafts of writing, and correspondence. It was donated to the IOE in 1993 by Read's family. The London School of Economics and Political Science also holds material by Read; the collection focuses on the Ngoni people of Malawi.
