= Pasir Ris Secondary School =

- 思励中学; Sekolah Menengah Pasir Ris

Location
- 1.3548°N 103.9485°E

Information
- Type: Government, co-educational, single-session
- Motto: Pride And Responsibility
- Established: 2 January 1985
- School code: 3235
- Principal: Ivan Biwei Wu
- Enrolment: approx. 1,500
- Colour: Yellow Green
- Website: pasirrissec.moe.edu.sg

Pasir Ris Secondary School is a co-educational government secondary school in Tampines, Singapore. It was one of the first secondary schools to be established in the area, which was then known as Pasir Ris. Although the area is now part of Tampines, the school's name has remained unchanged.

== History ==
Pasir Ris Secondary School was established in January 1985 at the premises of Chongzheng Primary School, while its own premises were under construction. With 11 Secondary 1 classes and 16 teaching staff, it was the first secondary school to be established in Tampines New Town to serve the growing population there. The school moved to its own new campus at Tampines Street 21 on 8 April 1985. It was officially opened in August 1987. The founding principal was Paramita Bandara.

The school underwent PRIME in 2005 to provide students with a more conducive environment through the improvement of school facilities. During this period, the school was relocated to temporary premises on Bedok South Road, the former premises of Temasek Primary School and Temasek Secondary School.

== Notable alumni ==
- Joshua Ang: Actor
