= Dasmond Koh =

Singaporean actor, TV host and DJ

- 许振荣
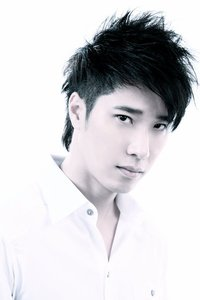
- Singaporean actor, television host, radio DJ and businessman
- Born: Dasmond Koh Chin Eng; 22 February 1972 (age 54); Singapore
- Education: Anglican High School
- Alma mater: Temasek Polytechnic
- Occupations: Hosting, Singing, Acting, Dancing & Deejay
- Years active: 1997–Present
- Agent: NoonTalk Media
- Awards: Full list

Chinese name
- Traditional Chinese: 許振榮
- Simplified Chinese: 许振荣
Transcriptions
Standard Mandarin
- Hanyu Pinyin: Xǔ Zhènróng
- Musical career
- Genre: Mandopop

Dasmond Koh Chin Eng (Chinese: 许振荣; born 22 February 1972) is a Singaporean actor, television host, radio DJ and businessman. He was a full-time Mediacorp artiste from 1995 to 2015. In 2015, He left Mediacorp to concentrate on NoonTalk Media which he co-founded in 2011.

== Career ==
Prior to entering the entertainment industry, Koh had been a full-time deejay with YES 933 since 1996. He was one of the RCS's most popular Chinese language deejays and was voted Friday Weekly Singapore's "Most Popular DJ" five years in a row and YES 933's most popular DJ for three consecutive years at the biennial RCS Golden Mike Awards.

In 2000 Koh joined MediaCorp while still juggling DJ duties and eventually resigned to join MediaCorp full-time several years later. Although fairly new to television, he was voted the Most Popular Newcomer at the Star Awards 2000 after starring in the sitcom Soho @ Work. He has hosted a variety of programmes ranging from travelogues to variety shows and major "live" events such as the Chingay Parade, Star Awards and SuperBand. Since crossing over to television, he has also enjoyed success as a host. He has been nominated for Best Variety Show Host and Best Info-Ed Show Host several times.

In 2012 he co-directed his first film Timeless Love.

In 2015, Koh left the entertainment industry and announced that he would not renew his Mediacorp contract due to him setting up a business entity. Currently, he is the co-host of The Sheng Siong Show, together with Kym Ng.

== Personal life ==
Koh was educated at Anglican High School and Temasek Polytechnic. In 2002, he was an Ambassador for World Vision and sponsored 2 Mongolian children.

== Filmography ==
=== Television ===
Year	Title	Role	Notes	Ref
1999–2000	Soho @ Work 新新关系	—N/a	—N/a	
2003	A Child's Hope	Hong Zhonggeng		
2003	A Toast of Love	Yang Jierong		
2004	When the Time Comes 一线之间	Zhang Shiwei		
2004	Family Combo 门当户对	Mei Youyou		
2004	A Child's Hope II 孩有明天	Hong Zhonggeng		
2005	Family Combo 2 门当户对	Mei Youyou		
2014	Scrum! 冲锋	Hei Ge		
2015	Life Is Beautiful	Jun Kai		
2020	Victory Lap 水样少年	—N/a		

Year	Title	Notes	Ref
2020	Victory Lap 水样少年	As producer	

=== Film ===
Year	Title	Role	Notes	Ref
2000	The Tree 孩子树	—N/a		
2008	Missing You...	Simon		
2012	Timeless Love	—N/a	As Director	

=== Variety show ===
Year	English title	Native title
1996	Brainstorm	脑力大比拼
2007	The Sheng Siong Show 2	缤纷万千在昇松 2
2008	The Sheng Siong Show III	缤纷万千在昇菘III
2008	The Sheng Siong Show IV	缤纷万千在昇菘IV
2009	The Sheng Siong Show V	缤纷万千在昇菘V
2010	The Sheng Siong Show VII	缤纷万千在昇菘 VII
2010	The Sheng Siong Show VIII	缤纷万千在昇菘 VIII
2011	The Sheng Siong Show 9	缤纷万千在昇菘 9
2011	The Sheng Siong Show 10	缤纷万千在昇菘 10
2012	The Sheng Siong Show 11	缤纷万千在昇菘 11
2012	The Sheng Siong Show 12	缤纷万千在昇菘 12
2013	The Sheng Siong Show 13	缤纷万千在昇菘 13
2013	The Sheng Siong Show 14	缤纷万千在昇菘 14
2014	The Sheng Siong Show 15	缤纷万千在昇菘 15
2014	The Sheng Siong Show 16	缤纷万千在昇菘 16
2015	The Sheng Siong Show 17	缤纷万千在昇菘 17
2015	The Sheng Siong Show 18	缤纷万千在昇菘 18
2016	The Sheng Siong Show 19	缤纷万千在昇菘 19
2016	The Sheng Siong Show 20	缤纷万千在昇菘 20
2017	The Sheng Siong Show 21	缤纷万千在昇菘 21
2017	The Sheng Siong Show 22	缤纷万千在昇菘 22
2018–2019	The Sheng Siong Show 23-27	缤纷万千在昇菘 23-27
2020	The Sheng Siong Show 28	缤纷万千在昇菘28
2020	Get Fit with Me	健康那些事
2021	The Sheng Siong Show 29-30	缤纷万千在昇菘29-30
2022-2024	The Sheng Siong Show 31-36	缤纷万千在昇菘31-36

== Radio hosting ==
Year	Title	Notes
1996	Especially For You	7pm – 11pm
1997	Late Night Dedication	11pm – 2am
1998	Lunch Show	12pm – 4pm
1999	The Nite Is Still Young	11pm – 2am
2000	The Nite Is Still Young	11pm – 2am
2001	Hi 中午好 Lunch Show	12pm – 2pm
2001	降温180 Relax 180	11pm-2am
2002	男女交叉点 FM933 Crossroad Junction	10pm-1am

== Compilation album ==
Year	English title	Mandarin title
2013	MediaCorp Music Lunar New Year Album 13	群星贺岁金蛇献祥和

== Awards and nominations ==
Year	Ceremony	Category	Nominated work	Result	Ref
2000	Star Awards	Best Newcomer	—N/a	Won	
2000	Star Awards	Top 10 Most Popular Male Artistes	—N/a	Won	
2000	Star Awards	Best Variety Show Host	Celebrity Telematch	Nominated	
2001	Star Awards	Best Variety Show Host	I Entertainment	Nominated	
2002	Star Awards	Best Variety Show Host	The Mission	Nominated	
2002	Star Awards	Top 10 Most Popular Male Artistes	—N/a	Won	
2003	Star Awards	Best Variety Show Host	The Mission	Nominated	
2003	Star Awards	Top 10 Most Popular Male Artistes	—N/a	Won	
2004	Star Awards	Top 10 Most Popular Male Artistes	—N/a	Won	
2005	Star Awards	Top 10 Most Popular Male Artistes	—N/a	Nominated	
2006	Star Awards	Top 10 Most Popular Male Artistes	—N/a	Nominated	
2007	Star Awards	Top 10 Most Popular Male Artistes	—N/a	Won	
2009	Star Awards	Best Info-Ed Programme Host	Tourism Insiders	Nominated	
2010	Star Awards	Top 10 Most Popular Male Artistes	—N/a	Nominated	
2011	Star Awards	Top 10 Most Popular Male Artistes	—N/a	Nominated	
2012	Star Awards	Top 10 Most Popular Male Artistes	—N/a	Won	
2013	Star Awards	Top 10 Most Popular Male Artistes	—N/a	Won	
2015	Star Awards	Top 10 Most Popular Male Artistes	—N/a	Won	
2018	Star Awards	Top 10 Most Popular Male Artistes	—N/a	Won	
2019	Star Awards	Top 10 Most Popular Male Artistes	—N/a	Won	
2021	Star Awards	All-Time Favourite Artiste	—N/a	Won	
