= Goh Kim Leong =

Singaporean civil servant (1948 – 2013)

Permanent Secretary of Law
- In office 1 July 1992 – March 2000

Permanent Secretary of Information
- In office 2 January 1988 – 30 March 1995

Permanent Secretary of Education
- In office 2 May 1980 – 1 January 1988

Personal details
- Born: 3 August 1948
- Died: 21 May 2013 (aged 64)
- Education: University of Toronto; London Graduate School of Business Studies
- Occupation: Mechanical engineer; civil servant

Goh Kim Leong (3 August 1948 – 21 May 2013) was a Singaporean civil servant who served as Permanent Secretary of Education from 1980 to 1987, of Information from 1988 to 1995, and of Law from 1992 to 2000. He chaired Singapore Computer Systems, the Singapore Broadcasting Authority, the Singapore Broadcasting Corporation, and the SMRT Corporation.

== Early life and education ==
Goh was born on 3 August 1948 and studied at the Anglo-Chinese School (Primary). A Colombo Plan scholar, he graduated from the University of Toronto with a Bachelor of Applied Science in mechanical engineering, and from the London Graduate School of Business Studies with a Master of Science in business studies. While at Toronto, he was a classmate of Philip Yeo, who would also go on to become a prominent civil servant.

== Career ==
Goh began his career as a civil engineer in 1971 at the Ministry of Defence. He then pivoted to administration by 1980. He returned to Singapore in July 1978 after graduating from the London Graduate School of Business Studies to serve as the Deputy Director of the Revenue Division of the Ministry of Finance.

=== Ministry of Education ===
In August 1978, it was announced that Goh was to be the secretary of a task force of systems engineers, led by Deputy Prime Minister (DPM) Goh Keng Swee, who would be appointed the Minister for Education in February 1979. The task force was to review the local education system, and had previously been guided by Goh Keng Swee when he was Minister for Defence. Santanu Gupta, the Deputy Director of Personnel at the Ministry of Education (MOE) until 1980, recalled that Goh was reserved, and did not use his power to assert authority. In early 1979, Goh Kim Leong was appointed the Director of MOE's Planning and Review Devision, succeeding Lim Jit Poh who had left to head the Industrial Training Board. Goh took up senior positions after Goh Keng Swee had been appointed its head. In March, the task force released the Goh Report, arguing that the MOE had an ineffective administrative system, that the schools division needed a large amount of change and that the development division held too much burden. The New Nation reported that this had left the MOE's senior officials insecure and demoralised. It was followed by a change in the country's educational policy. Goh was then made the ministry's principal assistant secretary. He was conferred the Pingat Pentadbiran Awam (Note: Malay for Public Administration Medal.) (Gold) at the National Day Awards later that year.

The Business Times reported on 22 April 1980 that in May, Goh was to assume the role of Permanent Secretary in the MOE. He would succeed Herman Hochstadt, who was to be transferred to the Monetary Authority of Singapore as deputy managing director. It made him the youngest civil servant, at the age of 31, overtaking Ngiam Tong Dow, to be appointed permanent secretary. Anthony Goh Bian Koon, a civil servant with the MOE at the time, later recalled being told that Goh Keng Swee had pushed for Goh Kim Leong's faster promotion out of a desire to appoint him Director of Education; such an appointment would require him to have a higher salary, one comparable to that of the director's. Director of Administration David Ma Kwok Leung described Goh as indirect and cautious when compared to Hochstadt. By January 1981, Goh had been appointed the head of a committee which studied the salaries of National University of Singapore staff in relation to the staff of foreign and private institutions. In February, he was appointed a representative of the MOE on the newly-established Schools Council, which aimed to improve communication between schools, the ministry and politicians. He was one of several Permanent Secretaries who were appointed the government's representatives on the National Productivity Council in September. By March 1982, he was also the chairman of the Systems Education Centre. He became the chairman of Singapore Computer Systems in the same year.

In 1982, Goh was also appointed the ministry's Director of Education, a position he held until 1985, on Goh Keng Swee's request. According to Anthony Goh, people at the ministry felt insulted by the appointment, as the post had previously only been held by ex-teachers. Anthony Goh also said that Goh was inefficient, being unable to make decisions due to insufficient confidence. John Yip, then the Director of Schools, produced a memo criticising this appointment, which circulated amongst the officers at the ministry's headquarters.

In March 1983, Goh was appointed the chair of a newly-established subcommittee of the MOE, which promoted co-operation in schools. He also chaired the Institute of Education Council in this period. He became the chairman of the Regional Language Centre governing board by April 1984.

=== MCI, Mita and MinLaw ===
On 2 January 1988, Goh was transferred from MOE to the Ministry of Communications and Information (MCI) as its second Permanent Secretary. The role of Permanent Secretary of Communications and Information, previously held by Tan Guong Ching, was split into two, with Goh and Tan serving as the Permanent Secretary of Information and the Permanent Secretary of Communications, respectively. He left the MOE in 1987, which left Er Kwong Wah, previously the Second Permanent Secretary in the MOE, as that ministry's only permanent secretary. Goh was also appointed the deputy chairman of the Singapore Broadcasting Corporation on 25 June, succeeding Cheng Tong Fatt who was to become the country's Ambassador to Japan.

In 1989, Goh was named the MCI's representative on the newly formed Economic Policy Review Committee, led by Minister of State for Trade and Industry Mah Bow Tan, which was to examine the economic impact of government policies. In 1990, he was appointed to a high-level committee formed by the Economic Development Board and chaired by Philip Yeo, to create a plan to support creative ventures in Singapore. In this period, he was also a member of the Executive Group, in charge of crisis policy execution, which was involved in the response to the 26 March hijack of Singapore Airlines Flight 117. The MCI was then split into the Ministry of Information and the Arts (Mita), in which Goh served as Permanent Secretary, and the Ministry of Communications, in which Tan was the Permanent Secretary. It was announced in 1992 that Goh and Tan were to additionally serve as Permanent Secretaries in the Ministries of Law (MinLaw) and the Environment, respectively. In this role, he was soon appointed to a committee of six to debate the excessive number of lawyers in the country. In the same year, both he and Tan were made members of the newly formed National Information Technology Committee, the successor to the Committee of National Computerisation, which was to organise the implementation of the IT2000 government initiative.

Goh was appointed the deputy chairman of the National Heritage Board on its founding, assuming the position on 1 August 1993. In April 1994, he was appointed to the Committee to Promote the Use of Mandarin. According to the Singapore Government Directory, Goh served seven different posts, the most out of any official. He was then also serving as the deputy chair of the National Arts Council and a member of the Urban Redevelopment Authority board and the Singapore Totalisator Board. Later that month, Mita announced that it had made Goh the founding chair of the newly-founded Singapore Broadcasting Authority statutory board. In this period, he worked with Liew Mun Leong as Mita's Permanent Secretary to establish the Chinese Opera Institute, as a supporter of Chinese opera. He had wanted to set up a national opera institute to unify the local troupes as the local Chinese opera scene was saturated with several groups that often disupted with one another. He said that such an institute was necessary to promote and revive the local scene, due to the decline in interest of Chinese opera.

As part of a restructuring of civil servant roles, it was announced in January 1995 that Goh was to be succeeded as Permanent Secretary to Mita by Tan Chin Tiong, the Second Permanent Secretary of Budget and Revenue at the Ministry of Finance, on 31 March. He would then assume the post of deputy chairman of SMRT Ltd and of the SMRT executive committee. By June, he was the executive committee's chair, and on 14 September, he assumed the post of SMRT chairman, succeeding Fock Siew Wah who was to head the Land Transport Authority board.

In 2000, Goh announced that he would be retiring from the civil service. He resigned from SMRT on 15 February and as Permanent Secretary in March. He was succeeded by Chew Choon Seng, an SMRT director, and Niam Chiang Meng, also the Permanent Secretary at Mita, as SMRT chair and Permanent Secretary at MinLaw, respectively. He was one of the longest-serving permanent secretaries at the time of his retirement.

Goh was made a member of the four-man board which was to decide on recipients for the grants of the Goh Keng Swee Foundation, established by Goh Keng Swee's wife, Phua Swee Liang, in 2008.

== Personal life and death ==
According to George Yeo, Goh was an avid fan of the arts. He sang Cantonese opera twice in public in 1999. According to Anthony Goh, while at the MOE, he was known for carrying his POSB Bank passbook and his ruler in his pocket.

Goh died on 21 May 2013. He was cremated at the Mandai Crematorium and Columbarium.
