= Tanjong Katong Girls' School =

Coordinates: 1.30865°N 103.89594°E

- 丹绒加东女校 DānróngJiādōngNǚxiào

Information
- Type: Autonomous Secondary
- Motto: Moribus Modestus (Demure and Resolute in Latin)
- Established: 12 January 1953; 73 years ago
- Session: single session
- School code: 3013
- Principal: Chew Ing Lim
- Enrolment: Approx. 1,000
- Colour: Maroon Gold Green
- Website: tanjongkatonggirls.moe.edu.sg

Tanjong Katong Girls' School (TKGS) is a government autonomous girls' secondary school in Katong, Singapore. Established on 12 January 1953, the school was the first post-war government English girls' school built in Singapore.

== History ==
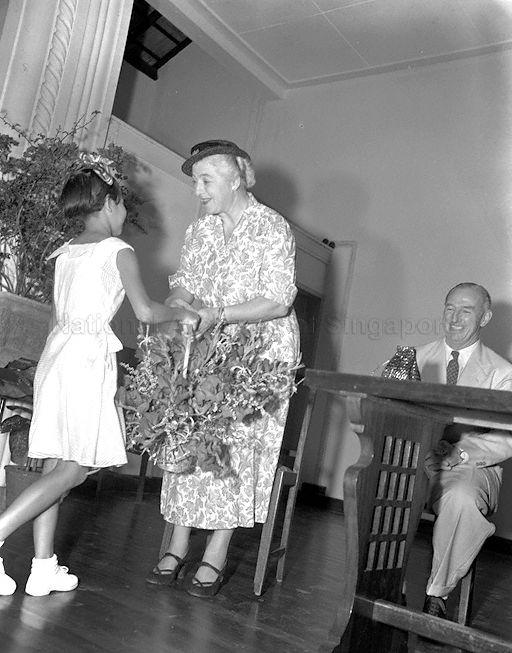
Freda Gwilliam officially opening the school on 12 March 1954

TKGS was established on 12 January 1953 with seven classes, 250 pupils, and ten teaching staff. The school was the first post-war government English girls' schools built in Singapore and it was officially opened in 1954 when Assistant Educational Advisor to the Secretary of State for Colonies Freda Gwilliam was invited.

TKGS was actually opened on 12 January 1953, with seven classes. That same year, the school began admitting Chinese school students. In 1955, new science laboratories were constructed.

TKGS became a double-session school in 1960 to cater to the increased enrolment of 1,200. TKGS has 4 houses, firstly, Charlotte, Teresa,, Halimah, Elizabeth. It was also the year Maude Scott, founding Principal of TKGS, was succeeded by See Tin See. TKGS became an integrated school in 1962, with the Chinese language. Since its establishment, TKGS has hosted trainees from the Teachers' Training Course (TTC), and has served as a workshop for Home Economics students. In the late 1970s, TKGS conducted "immersion programmes" for students from the Special Assistance Plan (SAP) schools, where students who had a Chinese medium of language were exposed to English lessons in an English environment. TKGS served as a Music Elective Programme (MEP) centre for students who were taking music as an 'O' Level subject but whose schools did not have suitable facilities.

In January 1966, the school was expanded to include another four-storey block which housed Science laboratories, classrooms and special rooms. A new cookery room was added to the domestic Science block and the canteen was extended to cater to the increased number of students. In 1967, the first Pre-University classes were started, boosting the student enrolment to 2,000. In 1972, TKGS won the champion title at the School Band Competition, and clinched the title at the Inter-School Debate Series in 1973. In 1975, TKGS produced the top girl in the Singapore-Cambridge GCE Ordinary Level examination.

In 1983, TKGS was selected by the Ministry of Education (MOE) for the Music Elective Programme (MEP), and was one of the four schools in Singapore to offer music as an examinable 'O' Level subject. The Pre-University programme was stopped in 1993 in line with MOE policy. In 1995, the school moved to a new campus at Dunman Lane, though the official opening only took place in 1997. The landmark sculpture, the "Spirit of TKGS", was commissioned and unveiled by Education Minister Teo Chee Hean during the school's official opening. Other achievements include gaining autonomous status.

TKGS curriculum includes all the pure Sciences, humanities and aesthetics. It was also one of the few schools in Singapore to offer Economics as an examinable 'O' Level subject, and at the first Cambridge GCE 'O' Level Economics Examination in 2008, TKGS produced the top Economics students in Singapore. Class periods were extended to 50 minutes in 2003, and in 2005, TKGS announced that it would be one of the first schools in Singapore to offer Drama as an examinable 'O' Level subject, although both Economics and Drama are no longer offered due to staffing issues. The LEGACY (Leading, Empowering, Guiding, Affirming and Challenging Youths) Programme was introduced as part of the Integrated Character Development Programme as well, consisting of classroom and experiential learning of moral education during curriculum time. Another initiative was the Multi-Disciplinary Project Work for the Secondary 2s, with Future Problem Solving at the core of its framework. The Chinese Special Programme (CSP) and the Malay Special Programme (MSP) were introduced for students in Malay and Chinese respectively to learn the other language. In 2007, TKGS was appointed the East Zone Centre of Excellence (COE) for English Language, in recognition of its innovative approach towards the teaching and learning of English and the students' consistently good performance in English at the GCE 'O' Level examinations.

TKGS now has an enrolment of 1,388 students and around 120 staff, and offers all the Pure Sciences, Economics, Drama, and Music in addition to the normal curriculum.

It offers the Music Elective Programme and the Drama Elective Programme. Every pupil is required to participate in at least one core co-curricular activity. Girls who desire to serve the school may participate in the optional non-core CCAs.

TKGS is partnered with Satri Si Suriyothai School in the Singapore-Thailand Enhanced Partnership (STEP) Programme. Students with good academic results from China, Brunei and Southeast Asian countries are also invited to join the school.

The current principal of TKGS is Chew Ing Lim, who succeeded Mary Seah.

== Academic information ==
TKGS is one of the few schools in Singapore that offer the Music Elective Programme (MEP) to students who wish to pursue Music as a subject at the Singapore-Cambridge GCE Ordinary Level.

== Notable alumni ==
- Felicia Chin, actress
- Halimah Yacob, eighth President of Singapore
- Haslinda Amin, journalist, Bloomberg Television anchor and chief international correspondent for Southeast Asia
- Ho Geok Choo, former Member of Parliament
- Koh Chai Hong, first female pilot, Republic of Singapore Air Force
- Vanessa Lee, national track and field athlete; national record holder for 3000 m steeplechase, 5000 m and 10 km (road)
- Jade Seah, model, host and actress
- Kanwaljit Soin, orthopaedic surgeon and first female Nominated Member of Parliament
- Kimberly Lim, Olympian (Sailing), 2020 Summer Olympics
