= Xixi Lim =

Singaporean actress (born 1988)

- 林茜茜
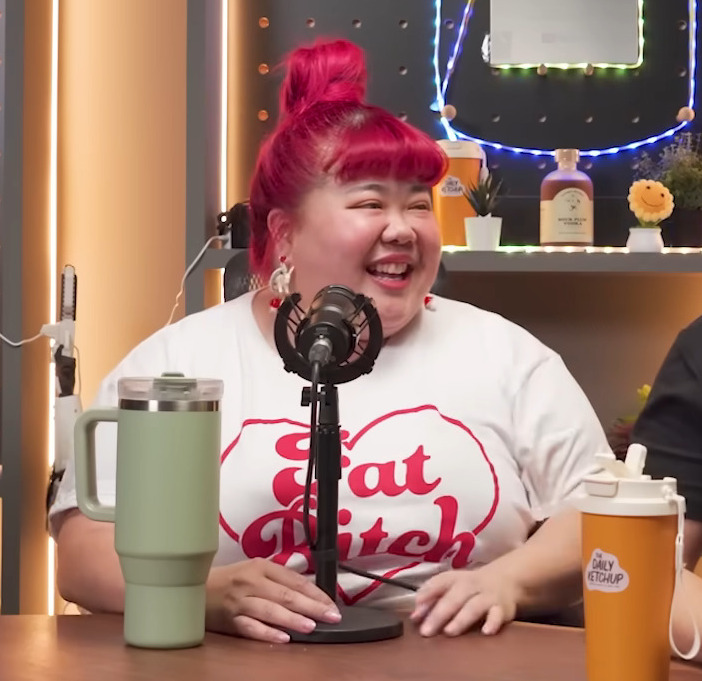
- Lim in 2025
- Born: Priscilla Lim Xixi; 25 January 1988 (age 38)
- Education: Republic Polytechnic; Murdoch University
- Occupations: Comedian; Influencer; Actor; Host; Model
- Years active: 2011–present

Chinese name
- Simplified Chinese: 林茜茜
Transcriptions
Standard Mandarin
- Hanyu Pinyin: Lín Xīxī

Priscilla Lim Xixi (born 25 January 1988), better known as Xixi Lim, (Note: Chinese: 林茜茜; pinyin: Lín Xīxī) is a Singaporean comedian, influencer, actor, host and model.

Lim had a short-lived career as a child actor in the 1990s, and pursued singing before stopping to focus on her studies. She described her childhood as challenging; she was persistently bullied in school for being fat and grew up in a single-parent household; while in polytechnic, she called the police, who arrested her mother over her history of gambling.

Lim started acting in 2011 and is known for various roles such as in Ah Girls Go Army (2022), The Blockbusters (2024), and A Good Fortune (2026). She cites her obesity as her identity and is proud of it, but does not wish to embody a stereotype. She hopes to empower obese people to "feel different" about themselves, and allow others to understand the lives of obese people.

== Early life ==
Xixi Lim is a Singaporean who was born on 25 January 1988. She first discovered her talent of humour when she gave speeches in class or stage, in which people laughed even when she was trying to be serious, due to her delivery in speech and expression. She enjoyed watching comedians such as Mark Lee and Hossan Leong.

Lim was a child actor for a short period of time in the 1990s. She wanted to pursue singing when she was young. She won a kids' singing competition on Channel 8, joining Teenage Icon, a Singaporean singing competition, auditioning for Singapore Idol at 16, and invited to host and sing at wedding ceremonies. In primary school, she created two albums, but stopped participating in the media industry to focus on studies, starting her career again in 2011 as an adult.

In school, Lim was part of the Trim and Fit programme, which targeted childhood obesity in the 90s and 00s. In secondary school, she first started getting bullied for her obesity. Her peers avoided actively supporting her as they feared becoming the next target of the bullying, while her teachers were dismissive as it was neither physical nor "too abusive", saying that it was a normal occurrence as a teenager and that it will become better by itself in due time. She became depressed as she could not bear her looks, wishing that she were ignored by people. She forced herself to look in the mirror every day and learnt self-love. After asking to join a project group, she realised that she was not hated by everybody, describing it as a turning point. She then studied in Republic Polytechnic, followed by Murdoch University, graduating in 2017.

Lim found her childhood challenging. She grew up with only her mother, as her father "left" the family when she was "very young". Although Lim was loved by her mother, she had a gambling habit and illegally borrowed money, accumulating an increasing unaffordable debt. When Lim was studying in polytechnic, she called the police as she "couldn't handle it", ultimately leading to her mother repeatedly entering prison after the arrest. Lim visited her mother in prison with her grandmother, hoping that she would learn her lesson and become a motherly figure again. Lim has forgiven her mother and are on amicable terms, and learnt to be stronger and independent from the incident.

== Career ==
Lim is a comedian, influencer, actor, host, and model. Lim is signed to Basic Models Management. She started acting in 2011, as she liked the acting industry and had an aptitude for it, but she was doubted by her family and friends. Her parents felt that she did not physically look suitable for acting. By pursuing her career, she hopes that she can be an inspiration for the young, empower both obese people and people who feel "different about themselves", and help others understand how fat people's lives are like. She does not want to represent a stereotype.

Mark Lee is one of her role models, citing his longevity in comedy, ability to perform even in serious roles, and parental way of coaching others, saying that he is successful and talented despite perceiving him as not good-looking. Another role model she considers is Hsin-ling, a Taiwanese actor, host and comedian who is similarly fat, who managed to also act as villains and mothers.

Lim enjoys and finds fulfilment in humouring people as she is happy when others are happy, believing that comedy is a good start and end to a day. She says that being "organic" and relatable is the most important trait of a comedian; she cites it as her method to comedy, being quick and friendly in sharing her personal thoughts on stage. She is proud of being fat, as it is her identity, but also knows that it is unhealthy. She finds it difficult to cast for roles outside of comedy, as people stereotype her as only being able to be funny. She also wants to take up travelling projects.

=== As personality ===
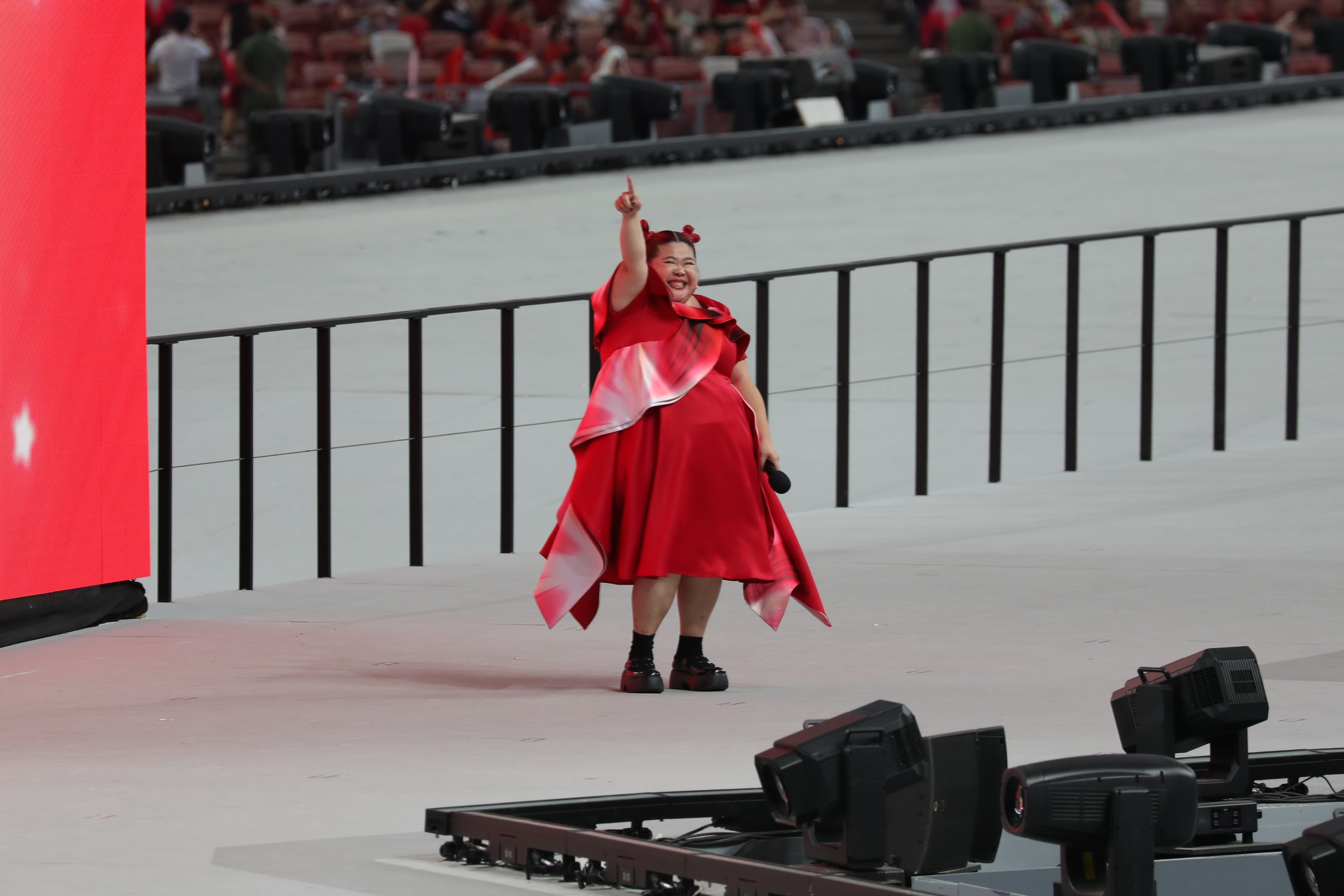
Lim hosting the National Day Parade in 2026

As of 2025, Lim is a regular host of the YouTube comedy series titled Outcasts, which has more than 76,000 subscribers as of 2024. She also appears in shows such as the second season of Say It Right!, a variety show testing influencers on their Mandarin, on Channel 8, and I Can See Your Voice in 2025, a Singaporean adaptation of the South Korean show I Can See Your Voice. In 2026, Lim hosted her first National Day Parade.

In 2022, Lim won $10,000 from Streamers Go Live, a reality competition where two teams compete to rack in the most sales hosting e-commerce live streams, due to having the most consistent ability to manage both entertaining viewers and advertising her product, according to the guest judge, Guo Liang. She was also given more chances in the future to host Mediacorp live streams.

=== As actor ===
Lim has played roles in Singaporean dramas such as My One in a Million (2019) and Hello From The Other Side (2022), as well as movies like I Not Stupid 3 (2024). In 2024, Lim won her first Star Awards' Top 10 Most Popular Female Artiste award. In the same year, she was nominated for the Asian Television Awards' Best Entertainment Presenter award, for hosting Mediacorp's variety show, titled #JustSwipeLah.

==== In drama ====
In 2024, Lim performed a lead role for the first time in The Blockbusters, a Channel 8 drama produced by Leong Lye Lin, as Bree, a reserved dancer with a low self-esteem, together with Singaporean actors Tay Ying and Kayly Loh, as well as Malaysian actor Meeki Ng. Lim struggled with keeping up with the dancing, saying that she was the slowest to learn them among her actor peers, and prepared by studying the dances at home.

==== In movies ====
In 2022, Lim acted in Ah Girls Go Army as Yuan Yuan Yuan, (Note: Also stylised as "Yuan Yuanyuan". There is no official Chinese transcription of the name and is rendered as "Yuan Yuan Yuan".) a supporting comic relief role of an overweight recruit. The director, Jack Neo, was criticised for fatshaming Lim by online Singaporeans, due to the name being the Mandarin word, 圆 (yuán), meaning "round", repeated three times. Lim did not take offence with the name, saying that she would be shamed for being fat regardless, and that the name was memorable. She accepted the role because the character had good stamina, was cheerful and was helpful, showing people that fat women are capable of more than what people think.

In 2026, Lim acted in her first movie protagonist role in A Good Fortune, a Chinese New Year-themed show involving pineapple tarts directed by Jason Lee, shot in Seremban, Malaysia. She acted as Kaixin, (Note: Also stylised as "Kai Xin".) a reserved local influencer who escaped from loan sharks to Malaysia after being scammed, and struggles with her body image after being told that it was not suitable for success. She is grateful to Lee for giving her the opportunity to let her act as the protagonist, as fat women do not typically get protagonist roles in Asian movies.

In 2026, Lim also acted in Dream Stall, a dramedy about bak kut teh and Generation Z defiance, directed by Annette Lee, where she plays the role of a childhood friend named Tammy, who excels in marketing.

=== As comedian ===
Lim made her comedy debut in June 2024 in the show titled Happy Ever Laughter – Standup Comedy Madness, featuring other comedians such as Fakkah Fuzz, Jason Leong and Noah Yap.

== Music ==
Lim released a single titled "I am Xixi" in 2022, which was a personal desire that was self-funded. She won $10,000 from Streamers Go Live, a reality competition where two teams compete to rack in the most sales hosting e-commerce live streams, which had made up for the cost of creating the single.

== Personal life ==
Lim is single, due to being busy with her career. In her early 20s, she ended a relationship due to her boyfriend being embarrassed to show others his relationship with her. She views the dating scene as superficial and judgemental with regards to beauty.

Lim thinks that people are more accepting of her size in Singapore, due to being more known locally, compared to overseas where they are more judgemental. She worries about the "inconvenience" of her size, such as sitting on public transport and taking planes, due to squeezing with people. She has tried to slim down, but found it difficult due to being busy, undetermined, and her enjoyment of food. She has tried diet pills, starving herself, exercising, and gua sha. She worries about being laughed at in a gym or at a fitness class, and breaking equipment under her weight. She hired a personal trainer in 2023.

Lim affirms herself when she feels down, such as by telling her assistant that she is pretty when walking past a mirror, or telling herself she is pretty after finishing her make-up. She de-stresses by venting aloud to a toilet bowl, and flushing it down after finishing verbalising her thoughts, as a ritual of symbolising flushing her negativity away.

Lim had three pets: Benji, a nine-year-old Shih Tzu who died in 2012, Xiao Xiao, a 17-year-old Japanese Spitz who died in 2020, and En En, a 16-year-old pomeranian adopted at 10 years old, who died in 2026.

Lim enjoys working and gets anxious if she is away from work for too long. However, on days off, she does not use her phone as she uses it too much in her career as an influencer, preferring to stay at home. She likes exploring Singapore, finding lesser-known shops or events. She enjoys playing board games, such as strategy games like The Resistance: Avalon or Saboteur, and games that require acting as she excels at it. She is bad at cooking, saying that her food is usually inedible and bland. She enjoys eating pineapple tarts without the pineapple filling, reminding her of her grandmother, who died around 2016.

Lim owns a dance studio, named BounXi Hippo Studio, after being encouraged by her assistant to post dancing videos on social media. She wanted to create a space that was free-of-judgement, quoting the overbearing professionalism in dance classes.
