= SSFA =

The acronym SSFA may refer to:

- Singapore Short Film Awards
- South Sudan Football Association
- School Standards and Framework Act 1998, UK

== See also ==
- Sperm-specific antigen 2 (SSFA2)
