= Xander Pang =

Singaporean theatrical actor (born 2000)

- 彭佳显
- Born: 2000 (age 25–26)
- Education: University of Cambridge
- Occupation: Actor
- Years active: 2019–present
- Parents: Adrian Pang (father); Tracie Pang (mother)

Xander Pang (Note: Chinese: 彭佳显; pinyin: Péng Jiāxiǎn) (born 2000) is a Singaporean actor who performs in theatre and film.

He debuted in theatre in 2010, in the play The Full Monty, and debuted in film in 2026, in the movie Dream Stall. He took a break from the acting scene during his study in ACS International until his graduation in 2018, acting in musicals like Late Company in 2019, Dear Evan Hansen in 2024, and Death Note: The Musical in 2026.

== Early life ==
Pang is a Singaporean who was born in 2000, to his father, actor Adrian Pang, and his mother, director Tracie Pang. He has an elder brother, a theatre actor who is a year older.

Pang studied for an International Baccalaureate in ACS International, graduating in 2018. From 2021 to 2024, he studied psychology at the University of Cambridge.

== Career ==
In 2011, Pang played Brainy Boy in Zero Hero on Okto. In 2025, Pang said that he wanted to pursue acting for life, admiring his parents' careers and describing it as a privileged opportunity to work with them. His parents did not actively push Pang to his career.

=== In plays ===
In 2010, Pang debuted in the play The Full Monty, produced by Pangdemonium, as the son in the story. During his study for an International Baccalaureate during secondary school, in which he graduated in 2018, he was "away from the scene", studying theatre and focusing on education. However, he still studied theatre in the meantime, yearning to go back to acting, and still remained involved. Pang has acted in many other plays, such as The Lightning Thief: The Percy Jackson Musical in London, Macbeth in Singapore Repertory Theatre, Beyond Paradise.

In 2019, Pang acted in the play Late Company, with his father. The play was directed by his father and mother, which was a story that tackles difficult issues such as cyberbullying and suicide. In 2024, he acted in Dear Evan Hansen which he won ST Life Theatre's "Best Supporting Actor" for. From July 2026, Pang will act as Light Yagami in Death Note: The Musical in the Barbican Theatre, a high school student who finds a notebook with the power to kill anybody whose name is written in it.

=== In film ===
In 2026, he debuted in film with the movie Dream Stall directed by Annette Lee, as a popular food YouTuber named Preston, the love interest of the protagonist. Due to his poor Mandarin, his role was changed to have poor Mandarin skills.

== Personal life ==
Pang is less confident in Mandarin than in English, saying that he can comprehend it but gets nervous when speaking it, due to having studied in the University of Cambridge where they mainly used English. He is a foodie, which he credits his grandmother for. He does not like owning a Facebook account, saying that it "stresses [him] out" and quoting the "amount of stupidity" on the platform. He describes himself as being "sensitive" and easily affected by others' comments.
