= Dream Stall =

Comedy-drama film (released 2026)

- Theatrical release poster
- Directed by: Annette Lee
- Written by: Annette Lee; Kew Lin
- Produced by: Nathaniel Yu; Jeffrey Tan
- Starring: Mark Lee; Annette Lee; Xixi Lim; Jaspers Lai; Ya Hui; Cassandra See; Xander Pang; Jack Neo; Hossan Leong; Lynn Poh
- Cinematography: Shyan Tan
- Edited by: Yen Lim
- Music by: Robbie Say
- Production companies: mm2 Entertainment; Plannette Pte. Ltd.
- Distributed by: mm2 Entertainment
- Release date: 27 May 2026 (Singapore)
- Running time: 102 minutes
- Country: Singapore
- Languages: English; Mandarin; Singlish; Hokkien
- Budget: About S$1 million

Dream Stall (Chinese: 梦想小店; pinyin: Mèng xiǎng xiǎo diàn) is a Singaporean comedy drama film directed by Annette Lee in her feature film debut. It was released on 27 May 2026. Written by Lee and Kew Lin, the film is about the struggles faced by a returning Singaporean university graduate trying to save her parents' bak kut teh hawker stall, with Lee, Mark Lee, Ya Hui, Xixi Lim, Jaspers Lai, and Xander Pang starring in the main roles.

The movie was released in a time of scepticism from the local audience. To win back trust, she refunded watchers who felt that they "wasted their time" on 5 June.

== Plot ==
As a child, Enya loved coming to her parents' bak kut teh stall after school. One day, however, her mother collapsed and died while working at the shop, leading to her father running the shop on his own. On his birthday, Enya made some bak kut teh for him to try, and stated her desire to continue the shop's legacy, but her father rebuked her and insisted that she should focus on academics.

After graduating from university in the United Kingdom, Enya returns to Singapore and finds out that her father terminated the shop's lease and is planning to retire. The landlord Ah Leong asks for an exorbitant amount to renew the lease; after some consternation, Enya sells her mother's jewellery to fund the cost. She hires her childhood friends, Tammy for marketing and Ah Ji (Archie) for waiting tables, convincing both of them to leave their stable but stifling jobs. Enya and her father get into a fight over her dream and having sold her mother's jewellery, culminating in Enya leaving home and living in Ah Ji's home.

Business gets off to a bad start when Ah Leong, encouraged by Enya's father, rents the neighbouring stall to a rival bak kut teh restaurant branded with the face of famous actress Estella Tsai. Despite bad service, Estella's restaurant proves popular due to savvy promotional tricks. Enya, however, gets her first customer, Preston, who appreciates the homemade food. When Preston asks her out, though, she throws away the slip with his number on it. However, as business gets worse, the team looks for food influencers who didn't go to Estella's and discovers that Preston was actually a content creator, known for his honesty and refusal of sponsored content.

After Enya digs through the trash to get back in contact, they go on a date, where she fakes interest in his favourite film, Yi Yi, in order to advance their relationship and bag a showcase video. She makes up some lies in the interview, saying that her father supported her business. After Preston's interview is published, business starts to boom and Enya gained more interest in Preston. However, as its popularity grows, her business became more commercialized and less human, leading to Ah Ji and Tammy quitting and Ah Ji kicking out Enya. She goes to Preston, but when he plays Yi Yi and she doesn't recognize it, he realizes her lies and kicks her out as well. Meanwhile, Estella's manager, Doreen, puts photos of Preston and Enya on a date in the media to discredit her.

Desolate, Enya spends the night in her restaurant, and meets Estella, who vents her frustration of having to maintain her persona, divulging her regret that she passed up the opportunity to be with her dying father for her breakthrough role. Revitalized, Enya returns to her father, who reveals that his inadvertent meeting with Preston earlier made him realize the importance of Enya's dreams and that he had secretly helped her by supplying handmade youtiao. Enya sends some bak kut teh, letters and relevant gifts to Ah Ji, Tammy and Preston to win back their trust. Ah Ji and Tammy agree to return, and the restaurant gets another boost after Estella closes "her" stall and promotes theirs on social media. On her father's birthday, Enya, Ah Ji and Tammy dine with him again. Preston makes a surprise appearance and offers to take her out again; with encouragement from everyone else, she hops on his motorcycle and rides away with him.

== Cast ==
- Annette Lee as Enya (Note: Chinese: 恩雅; pinyin: Ēnyǎ)
- Mark Lee as Enya's father
- Ya Hui as Estella
- Xixi Lim as Tammy
- Jaspers Lai as Ah Ji (Archie) (Note: Chinese: 阿吉; pinyin: Ājí)
- Cassandra See as Doreen, Estella's manager
- Xander Pang as Preston
- Jack Neo as Ah Leong, the landlord
- Hossan Leong as a restaurant manager
- Lynn Poh as Enya's mother

== Production ==
=== Development ===
In 2022, Anthony Chen, a Singaporean film director, suggested to Lee to create a comedy movie, similar to the American comedy Bridesmaids, making her revisit her desire in university of making a movie; Lee studied digital filmmaking at the Nanyang Technological University's School of Art Design and Media. Lee took about 1.5 years to finalise writing the script. In 2025, Lee announced she would be producing Dream Stall. It was produced on a budget of just under S$1 million, which partially comprised government funding, investors, and sponsors.

The movie was inspired by Lee's own artistic journey and difficulties of young Singaporeans pursuing unorthodox careers, and the definition of success in Singapore's pragmatic society. Through hosting Adventure of the Day, a food show, Lee was also inspired by passionate young Singaporeans who pursued being a hawker despite having degrees or better job opportunities. It celebrated Singaporean culture and she hopes that it provokes thoughts about the speed of erosion of Singaporean culture, such as in cuisine and film.

=== Pre-production ===
Lee was supported by multiple people in the industry, such as Mark Lee, who reached out quickly upon news of production. In a casting call promotional skit, Lee jokingly denounced Jack Neo by saying that movie-making is unprofitable for everybody except Neo, and that she wanted to make a more successful movie than Neo. Neo responded that he would help Lee in any non-monetary way, grieving the lack of new filmmaking talents in Singapore, who eventually cameoed as the greedy landlord in the movie.

=== Filming ===
Production started on 8 October 2025. It was partially filmed in Malaysia, as it was hard to find an affordable and suitable place in Singapore according to Lee. The movie used Singlish, which she hoped to normalise by widening the local movie scene, and was filmed in English and Mandarin. It also used Hokkien, such as in some scenes with Enya's father. It is classified as a comedy-drama film.

Some members of the public were recruited to view trial recordings and give feedback, which the movie used for iterative improvement.

=== Post-production ===
Lee wrote and performed two songs, Strangers' Land and Better Than Yours (The Bak Kut Teh Song). Better Than Yours (The Bak Kut Teh Song) was co-sang with Jenn Chia. The movie included a piece of music from Money No Enough by Jack Neo, as an expression of respect.

== Release ==
Dream Stall, which was Lee's debut film, first released at The Star Theatre on 21 May 2026 as a gala. It was released in Singaporean cinemas on 27 May 2026, and was also shown in Malaysia and Brunei. It was distributed by mm2 Entertainment.

It was released when cinema attendance was dwindling and locally produced films faced increasing dismissal; a discussion on HardwareZone, an internet forum, had already formed by 11 May which expressed hate for her and her film. Lee attributed the attitude possibly to past bad experiences with local films, and believed that local filmmakers must regain audience trust. As such, she promised to refund watchers that felt that they "wasted their time". Internet users commended her certainty and eagerness to vouch for her work. Twelve people showed up at the feedback session at *SCAPE on 5 June 2026, of which only one person was refunded, after his criticism of its filming location in Malaysia despite the story being set in Singapore, unnatural humour, and use of Singlish and the Singaporean accent.

It was eligible for the SG Cultural Pass, a scheme which provided Singaporeans S$100 of credits to encourage attendance of local arts and experiences.

== Critical reception ==
Tay Yek Keak of 8days wrote that despite Dream Stall being about legacy food continuation, it was not a food movie, but a movie about the stubborn insistence and lack of compromise from Enya, quoting Generation Z defiance. He also commended Dream Stall for being an English-speaking Singaporean film that was not too pretentious or ambitious.

Chai Yee Wei, a Singaporean filmmaker, wrote on Facebook to stop comparing local films against foreign films, after reading a harsh review of the movie. He commended the film, comparing it with the other films released in the same period of Singaporean film history.

Zhong Yanling of Lianhe Zaobao compared the setting of the movies, with Dream Stall's café to Follow Aunty La's (Note: Chinese: Aunty当网红; pinyin: Aunty dāng wǎng hóng) kopitiam, saying that Dream Stall felt "smoother". Zhong wrote that the film excelled in pacing, subtle sponsor insertions, and use of an everyday hawker premise to propel the story, and that it was promising for a debut film. However, Zhong also wrote that it was shallow and not emotionally moving, quoting the superficiality of Enya's "setbacks" and being "out-of-touch" at its core, with its overbearing use of nostalgia.

Lin Jiahao of 8world wrote that the film felt local and homely, quoting the filming locations and use of bak kut teh, and the friendships and disagreements in the movie. Lin wrote that it was a change of pace from Lee's usual short-paced humorous videos online, as she chose to shoot more realistic and serious scenes, which moviegoers may not be used to seeing, and that it was promising for a debut film. However, Lin also wrote that the plot was predictable and the characters were not expanded on enough.
