= 李安 =

李安 (pinyin: Lǐ Ān) may refer to:

- Ang Lee, a Taiwanese filmmaker
- Annette Lee, a Singaporean singer-songwriter
