= Shantol Jackson =

Jamaican actress (born 1992)

Shantol Jackson (born 7 July 1992 in Portmore) is a Jamaican actress.

== Life and career ==
Shantol Jackson grew up in Kingston with her sister Suane. She attended Southborough Primary School, where her teachers sparked her interest in American folk music. In fifth grade she won a silver medal for a musical piece. In seventh grade at Ardenne High School she also joined a drama club, which is where her passion for acting began.

Jackson first appeared in various stage productions. At the age of nineteen she played Nardia in Thicker than Water. In 2015 she played several roles in God Guh Wid Yuh, and the following season she appeared as Candy Barr in Same Difference. That same year she worked in front of a film camera for the first time. She played the title role in the short film Sugar, and in Sprinter she portrayed the athlete Kerry Hall, who becomes a role model for a young sprinter. On this drama she worked alongside eight-time Olympic champion and eleven-time world champion Usain Bolt, who appeared as himself.

In 2018 she played Yvonne in Yardie, directed by Idris Elba. She gained wider recognition through the British-French television series Death in Paradise. Since the first episode of the eleventh series she has played Naomi Thomas, an initially inexperienced sergeant who helps Detective Inspector Neville Parker (Ralf Little) solve murders and other crimes on the fictional island of Saint Marie. She also appears in the sixth episode of the first series of Beyond Paradise.

== Selected filmography ==
- 2016: Sugar (short film)
- 2018: Sprinter (drama)
- 2018: Yardie (crime film)
- 2021–present: Death in Paradise (TV series, 44 episodes)
- 2023: Beyond Paradise (TV series, 1 episode)
