= SSTA =

SSTA may refer to

- Scottish Secondary Teachers' Association
- Sea Surface Temperature Anomaly
- Singapore Space and Technology Association
- Statistical Static Timing Analysis
- Stockholm Stads Tekniska Aftonskola
