= Glenn Yong =

Singaporean actor and singer (born 1996)

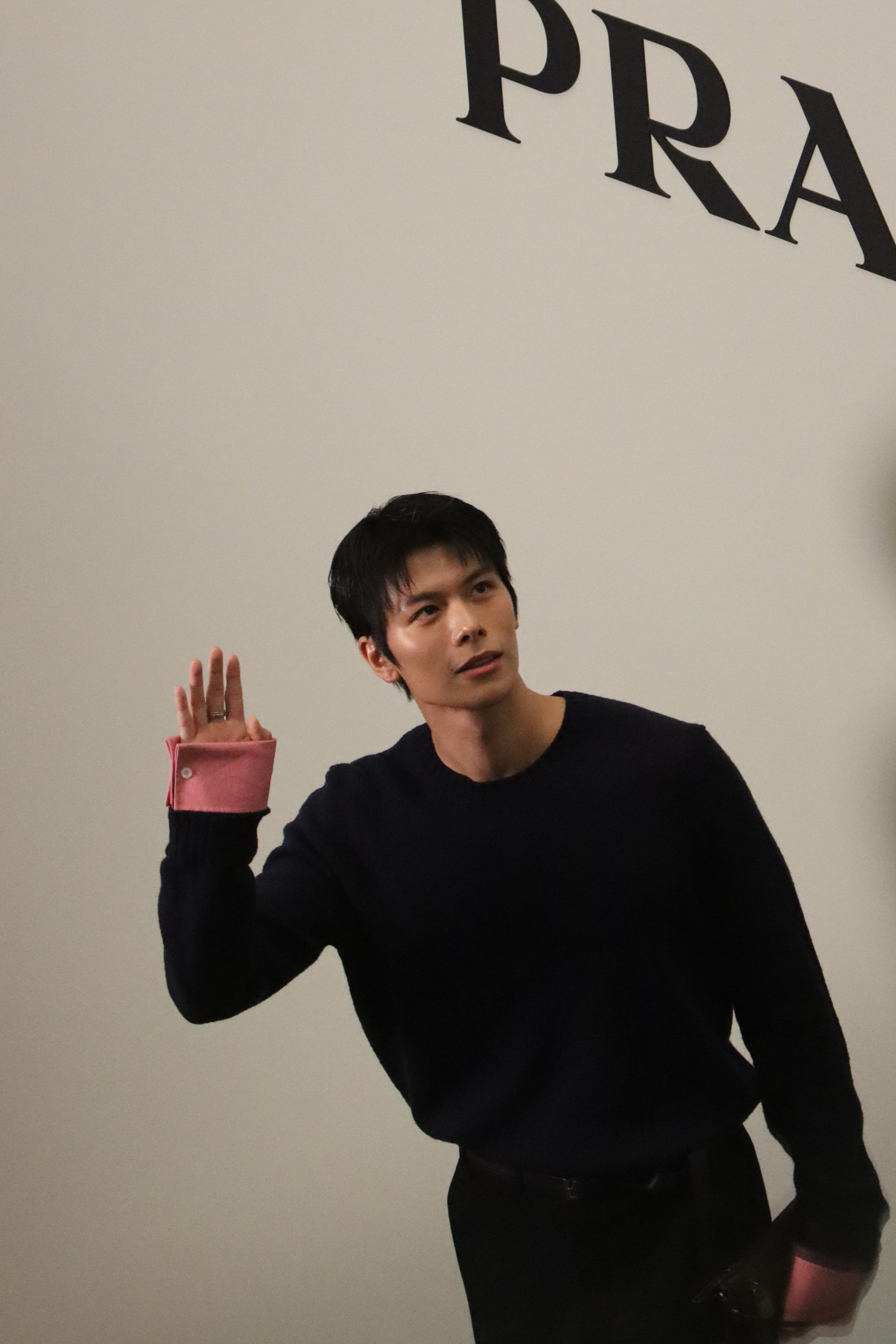
- Yong in 2026 at Prada event
- Born: 10 October 1996 (age 30); Singapore
- Other name: Rong Qihang
- Education: Peicai Secondary School; Temasek Polytechnic
- Alma mater: Murdoch University
- Occupations: Actor; singer
- Years active: 2019–present

Chinese name
- Traditional Chinese: 容啟航
- Simplified Chinese: 容启航
- Hanyu Pinyin: Róng Qǐháng

Glenn Yong (born 10 October 1996) is a Singaporean actor and singer. In 2022, Yong became the first and only Singaporean to be featured on TC Candler's "Top 100 Most Handsome Faces in the World" Global list. He debuted on the television screen in 2021 with Live Your Dreams (大大的梦想), and in the movies in 2021 with Ah Girls Go Army.

== Early life and education ==
Glenn Yong was born on 10 October 1996 in Singapore. He is the youngest in the family with an older brother.

Yong attended PAP Kindergarten, Montfort Junior School, Peicai Secondary School and Temasek Polytechnic. After National Service, Yong studied at Murdoch University and graduated in October 2020, with a degree in marketing.

== Career ==
In 2019, Yong started acting as a supporting role in The Good Fight (致胜出击) in which he played the younger version of one of the main characters.

In 2020, Yong was cast in the television series Victory Lap (水漾少年) alongside Thailand GMM artiste Earth Pirapat. Yong released his first single 妈妈好 in May 2020.

In September 2021, Yong made his acting debut and starred in his breakout role as 孙易安, the male lead role in the musical drama series, Live Your Dreams (大大的梦想). Yong's first solo original soundtrack (OST) song, 幸福的未来, was also released in the soundtrack album together with the drama series.

In October 2021, Yong was cast as the male lead for Jack Neo's Ah Girls Go Army with the role of Sergeant Chow, one of the two trainers in the movie. The film was widely panned by audiences and critics.

In March 2022, Yong performed at the National Stadium for "Relay For Life 2022" event organized by Singapore Cancer Society. In May, he was appointed as Singapore Cancer Society's Goodwill Ambassador to raise cancer awareness among the youth.

In May 2022, Yong joined media company ConfirmGood as its head of marketing.

In June 2022, Yong released his new first English single and music video, UP UP, about his experiences in the entertainment industry since his debut in 2019 and he hopes to encourage and empower people to keep moving up despite the odds.

With the continuation of Jack Neo's Ah Girls Go Army movie, Ah Girls Go Army Again was released as well with Yong acting as Sergeant Chow in the movie.

In September 2022, Yong filmed his next movie titled The King of Musang King as one of the lead roles, which was released in early 2023.

In November 2022, Yong performed at the Singapore Indoor Stadium for Sing.浪 Concert 2022 with up to a crowd of 8,000 audiences in total.

In December 2022, over 320,000 worldwide celebrities and 1800 nominees, Yong was voted and ranked number 62 of the top 100 most handsome faces in the world on TC Candler. Yong is also the first and only Singaporean to make it on the TC Candler Global list.

In June 2023, Yong began filming Jack Neo's I Not Stupid 3, playing the male lead role.

In December 2023, Yong once again secured a spot on the TC Candler 100 Most Handsome Faces list, marking his second consecutive year of recognition. This time, he was ranked 75th place on the TC Candler Global list.

In December 2024, In December 2024, Yong achieved the honor for the third consecutive year, climbing to an impressive 35th place on the TC Candler Global list.

In 2025, Glenn returns to music with his most personal project yet — a purpose-driven mandopop EP and powered by authenticity. His first single & music video, 没有你的世界 was released in March 2025.

== Discography ==
=== Singles ===
Year	Title	Notes	Ref
2021	幸福的未来 (Xing Fu De Wei Lai)	Live Your Dreams (大大的梦想) OST	
2022	UP UP		
2023	BREAK OUT		
2025	没有你的世界 (Mei You Ni De Shi Jie)		

== Filmography ==
=== Television series ===
Year	Title	Role	Notes	Ref
2019	The Good Fight (致胜出击)	Young Xie Zhengbin		
2020	Victory Lap (水漾少年)	Liu Jian		
2020	How Are You Today? (今天,你还好吗?)	Hang		
2021	My Star Bride	Liang Youwei Osmond	Episode 15 to 19	
2021	Live Your Dreams(大大的梦想)	Sun Yi-an		
2021	Justice Boo Yongfeng (拯灵49天)	Ma Han		
2022	The Heartland Hero	Nick	Cameo, episode 101	
2025	Step Dave (我的鲜肉老爸)	Dave		

=== Film ===
Year	Title	Role	Notes	Ref
2022	Ah Girls Go Army	2nd Sergeant Chow		
2022	Ah Girls Go Army Again	2nd Sergeant Chow		
2023	The King of Musang King	Ah Liang		
2024	I Not Stupid 3 (小孩不笨 3)	Mr. Lee		

== Awards and nominations ==
Year	Awards	Category	Nominated work	Result	Ref
2022	Star Awards	MyPICK! Favourite Male Show Stealer	Live Your Dreams	Nominated	
2022	Star Awards	MyPICK! Favourite CP	Live Your Dreams	Nominated	
