= Ah Girls Go Army =

- Directed by: Jack Neo
- Written by: Link Sng
- Starring: Apple Chan; Glenn Yong; Samantha Tan; Shirli Ling; Farah Farook; Eswari Gunasagar; Kelly Kimberly Cheong; Belle Chua Bei Er; Karyn Wong Shimin; Charlene Huang Xiang Lin; Veracia Yong; Xixi Lim; Ke Le; Juliet Hor; Yong Yu; Chloe Goh; Vanessa Tiara Tay; Debra Loi; Jonathan Tee; Vince Chua; Chuang Li; Chan Li Li
- Edited by: Yim Mun Chong
- Production companies: J Team Productions mm2 Entertainment; Asia Momentum Media
- Distributed by: Cathay Organisation
- Release dates: 1 February 2022; (Singapore, Malaysia, Brunei)
- Running time: 120 minutes
- Country: Singapore
- Languages: English; Mandarin
- Budget: S$2 million
- Box office: S$2.5 million (as of 17 Feb 2022)

Ah Girls Go Army (simplified Chinese: 女兵外传; traditional Chinese: 女兵外傳; pinyin: nǚ bīng wàizhuàn; lit. 'Female Soldiers' Biography') is a 2022 Singaporean military comedy film directed by Jack Neo. A spin-off of Neo's Ah Boys to Men films, the film follows the first batch of female recruits as they undergo and serve National Service in the fictional near future of Singapore.

The film stars Apple Chan, Xixi Lim, Samantha Tan, Shirli Ling, Farah Farook, Eswari Gunasagar, Kelly Kimberly Cheong, Belle Chua Bei Er, Karyn Wong Shimin, Charlene Huang Xiang Lin, Veracia Yong, Juliet Hor, Glenn Yong, Ke Le, Yong Yu, Chloe Goh, Vanessa Tiara Tay, Debra Loi and Summer Loh.

It was one of the five 2022 Malaysian and Singaporean Chinese New Year films, including Reunion Dinner (Singapore), Nasi Lemak 1.0, Kongsi Raya and Small Town Heroes (Malaysia). On release, the film was panned by critics.

== Synopsis ==
The film is set in a theoretical future where, due to the declining birth rate in Singapore, there are not enough males to fulfil the National Service manpower requirements. The film focuses on the first batch of female SAF recruits, who are 14 Gen-Z girls from different socio-economic backgrounds. They undergo Basic Military Training, which pushes them to their physical and emotional limits. As they undergo their training, they begin to appreciate National Service, and also learn to manage their personal issues.

== Cast ==
- Apple Chan as 2nd Lieutenant Roxanne Tan
- Glenn Yong as 2nd Sergeant C K Chow
- Ke Le as Recruit Princess See
- Belle Chua as Recruit Joey Tay
- Xixi Lim as Recruit Yuan Yuan Yuan
- Samantha Tan as Recruit Goh Bee Bee
- Eswari Gunasagar as Recruit Kamala
- Charlene Huang as Recruit Lau Lan Lan
- Shirli Ling as Recruit Chow Ai Lian
- Veracia Yong as Recruit Peh Mani
- Kelly Kimberly Cheong as Recruit Amanda Ong
- Karyn Wong as Recruit Karen Seow
- Farah Farook as Recruit Fatimah
- Chloe Goh as Recruit Zhang Li
- Vanessa Tiara Tay as Recruit Bobo Chia
- YY Yong Yu as Recruit Soh Bi Qing
- Juliet Hor as Recruit Monica Chng
- Jonathan Tee as Sergeant Mar Tee
- Debra Loi
- Jaze Phua as Sergeant Ho
- Andruew Tang as Sergeant Hulk Tan

== Production ==
=== Development ===
Plans for the film were announced in September 2021. Neo had wanted to shoot this film as he wanted to explore the scenario where conscription of women for National Service is required to support Singapore's defence. Neo said that Singaporeans are fortunate to live in a relatively safe and stable world, but wanted to know what happens should the population of young people drop to levels below what is required for defence given the falling birth rate each year. He added that the film wishes to explore if women can step up for defence much like men are expected, mirroring the first batch of male recruits called up in 1967. The film is sponsored by companies like Holistic Way, Foodpanda, CARRO Group, Nippon Paint, Ogawa, Seng Choon, New York Skin Solutions, and Livingcare.

=== Casting ===
Casting began via online auditions in September 2021, the same time when plans were first announced. Those who participated were to send videos of themselves acting as a character they chose. The auditions attracted thousands of audition videos submitted for the film, thus increasing the number of female recruit roles from an initial 10 to 14. The cast was unveiled in October that year, with some prominent faces including Apple Chan, ex-Night Owl Cinematics talent Samantha Tan, founder/content creator of Double Up 欢迎光玲 (known for their viral Chinese comedy skits) Charlene Huang Xiang Lin, voice actress and martial arts content creator Kelly Kimberly Cheong, Miss Vasantham finalist Eswari Gunasagar, Farah Farook, Xixi Lim, Mediacorp artistes Ke Le and Glenn Yong among others.

=== Filming ===
Filming is expected to last 25 days, with all scenes being completed by November 2021. Shooting only began on 12 November 2021, when the lensing ceremony was held. The scenes were finished in December 2021.

=== Controversy ===
An uproar ensued over one of the characters named "Amanda Man" by netizens raising concerns over offence potentially caused to the transgender community and perpetuating misconceptions, coming after actress Kelly Kimberly Cheong posted a picture of herself during the film's lensing ceremony. The post has since been taken down, and Cheong clarified that the character she plays is a "cisgender, biological girl" who is known for her fighting ability. Cheong later raised the issue to Neo, adding that the character is a tomboy and did not mean for the backlash to happen. Nonetheless, Neo still pledged to change the character's name, apologising for any distress caused. The character was eventually changed to "Amanda Ong".

Some criticism was also given to the naming of an obese character as 'Yuan Yuan Yuan' (meaning Round Round Round in Mandarin), played by Xixi Lim, which was slammed as fat-shaming and a lack of creativity. Neo refuted these criticisms, saying that people should watch the movie first before commenting and that the character did more things than they thought. Lim added that the character's name was "cute" as it sounded like her double name, and hopes those watching will get the message that people who are large can do many things just like those who are small.

== Release ==
The film was released in Singapore cinemas on 1 February 2022, the first day of Chinese New Year. Before the release, on 21 January, the producers of the film announced an exclusive giveaway of 8,888 non-fungible tokens via Cathay Cineplexes during advance ticket sales that began on 28 January.

== Reception ==
The movie received widespread criticism and scorn prior and after its release. The Straits Times film correspondent John Lui gave the film 2/5 stars, remarking that it was "as funny as a positive Covid test", that it "takes effort to be this terrible" - "where effort is made to make fun of women being women", that it was "making fun of people already made fun of in society". Douglas Tseng from 8 Days gave it 1/5 stars, describing Jack Neo's directing and storytelling as "tone deaf", and full of pervasive product placements. Tseng also criticised the unflattering depiction of women in the movie, remaking "Seriously, do young women really behave like this? Jack, when was the last time you hung out with young women?". Lim Yian Lu from Yahoo! Life similarly criticised the product placement and incoherent plot, giving it 1/5 stars. Delfina Utomo from Time Out said the movie is mostly a "chaotic Facebook Live video of someone selling me products", a film with low-brow humour that is characteristic of Neo's previous films, and the plot revolving around "taking initiative". Utomo also pointed out that the scriptwriters writing the film had no idea of "what it's like being woman", saying that the dialogue and plot appeared condescending even as it avoided objectifying women. This is emphasised by the fact that the film's characters acted or spoke in a childish manner, further elaborated with a film's character whose suicide attempt was treated rather insensitively.

Matthaeus Choo from Sinema.SG commented that though Jack Neo has previous movie successes by bringing to life emotions shared by Singaporeans, the film appeared to be disconnected from reality. Choo added that while Ah Boys to Men was able to scrape by as the characters are stand-ins for people being encountered in real life, the movie does not have that link, criticising the stereotypes that underpin the show. Amanda Tan from Youthopia said that the movie was a "slipshod" rendition of the original Ah Boys to Men film series, referencing previous criticisms made by previous reviewers including a poorly written story and characters not being fully developed with the only saving point being good-looking actors. Tan pointed that as a Gen-Z woman, she only took the message that it was a "misogynistic portrayal of women", being unable to comprehend the unrealistic plot.

The Ministry of Defence also chimed in, asking anyone that wishes to really know what girls undergo in Basic Military Training to watch their 2015 series instead.

In response to these criticisms, Ah Boys to Men actor Tosh Zhang slammed those hating the film on Facebook, alluding to the silent majority who watched the movie and defending the cast, congratulating them for their effort. Several main and supporting cast members thanked Zhang for his support. Zhang also put up a more forceful post on Instagram. Neo justified product placements in the film by saying it is difficult to make money from movies. Quoting an example, Neo said that if a movie production cost $1 million, another $3 million is needed before it starts to earn profits.

=== Box office ===
Despite negative reviews, the movie raked in S$1.15 million as of 3 February 2022, with the S$1 million mark achieved over the first six days. It reached the S$1.3 million mark a day later, then S$1.67 million on 7 February and eventually grossing over S$2 million as of 17 February 2022. In Malaysia and Brunei, the film had a grossing of RM1.5 million as of 17 February 2022. Despite high profits at the box office, mm2 Entertainment admitted that reception to the movie was "mixed".

== Sequel ==
Plans for a sequel called Ah Girls Go Army Part 2 were announced on 7 February 2022, with the release date tentatively set for June 2022. Some scenes have already been shot as part of the sequel, with additional scenes to be shot in March. The film, now known as Ah Girls Go Army Again, was released on 16 June 2022.

"The girls go through gruelling obstacles in their GBMT journey, which eventually lands them in a dangerous situation and their actions will shock the nation."

== See also ==
- The Dawns Here Are Quiet
- The Dawns Here Are Quiet (2015 film)
