= Ginseng chicken soup =

Type of soup

Ginseng chicken soup is a type of soup, which involves chicken and ginseng (either panax ginseng, female ginseng, or pseudo ginseng) as one of the main ingredients. Ginseng can typically be cooked with chicken in broth, porridge, and soups. Varieties of ginseng chicken soup can be found in Asian countries, such as China, Malaysia, and Korea.

== Chinese ==
In China, many traditional Chinese foods are associated with therapeutic properties and health-promoting effects. Some traditional Chinese foods which involves poultry products are recognized for their tastes, their nutritional values and health promoting benefits. The Chinese chicken soups, which are cooked in many different types of herbs, such as ginseng, ginger, black mushrooms, wolf-berry fruits, dried Chinese jujubes, and other ingredients, such as a wine and sesame oil, have typically been used to facilitate the speedy recovery of patients. Ginseng chicken soups are also eaten by the overseas Chinese diaspora.

=== Renshen jitang ===
In Chinese cuisine, there is a ginseng chicken soup called Renshen jitang (人蔘雞湯; lit. "Ginseng chicken soup") and is considered as a "medicated food" (藥膳) following Traditional Chinese medicine. The Renshen jitang is believed to be good for elderly and convalescent people, but is not unsuitable for young people. There are several variations of recipes for Chinese ginseng chicken soups; however, the cooking process typically involves the combination of the chicken, ginseng, and other ingredients in a large pot of boiling water, followed by a long simmering process.

=== Dun jitang ===
In Cantonese cuisine, there is a form of ginseng chicken soup called dun jitang or dungye tong (炖鸡汤), also known as "chicken herbal soup". It involves double-boiling technique for a very long period of time and uses ginseng beards and chicken breasts or chucks of old chicken.

The double-boiled chicken cooked with dong quai (当归; i.e. female ginseng) or panax ginseng is a common type of bo (補) eaten by Chinese women on their first trimester of pregnancy. It is also a common bo eaten by Chinese women during the postpartum confinement, along with many other kind of postpartum confinement dishes (e.g. boiled chicken with wine or brandy and with a lot of ginger).

=== Zibu wujitang ===
There is also another form of Chinese ginseng chicken soup called Zibu wujitang (滋补乌鸡汤; also known as "black chicken soup") which uses black chicken. The cooking process involves boiling the water before adding the chicken and the ginseng or female ginseng, along with other Chinese herbs before boiling again; it is then simmered for a long period of time. Rice wine can also be added before switching off the heat.

=== Heijitang ===
In Cantonese cuisine, there is variation of the zibu wujitang (滋补乌鸡汤). A variation of this recipe is called the "Double boiled black chicken soup"; this recipe involves double-boiling for a very long period time. It is sometimes known as Heijitang (黑鸡汤) or Hark gye tong. As this soup contains silkie chicken, it is supposedly more nourishing than white chicken, and is good for women in postpartum period. Ginseng beard is used in this recipe; however, ginseng slices can also be an alternative.

=== Ginseng chicken ===
In Jilin cuisine, there is a type of ginseng chicken where ginseng is stuffed inside a young chicken before being place in a soup or broth; they are then steamed together.

=== Gallery ===
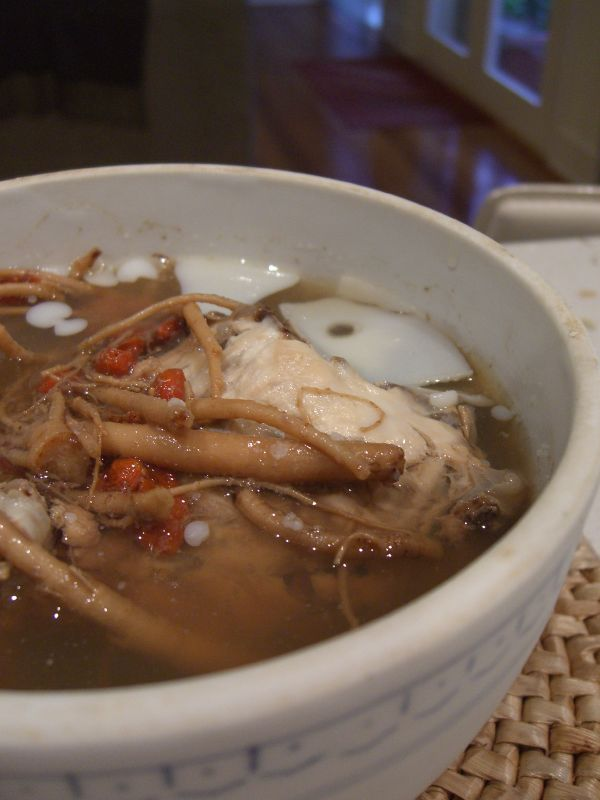
Double Boiled Chicken Soup with Chinese Herbs

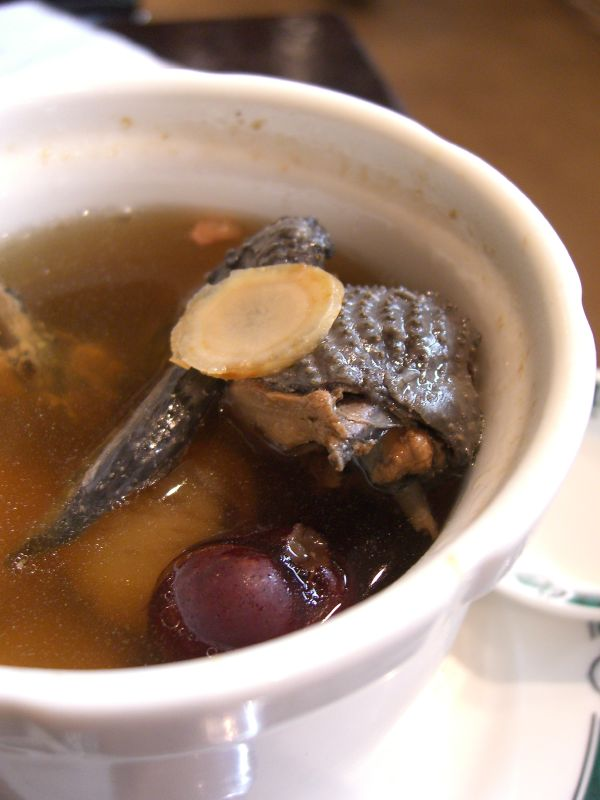
Double-Boiled Silkie Bantam Chicken and American Ginseng Soup.

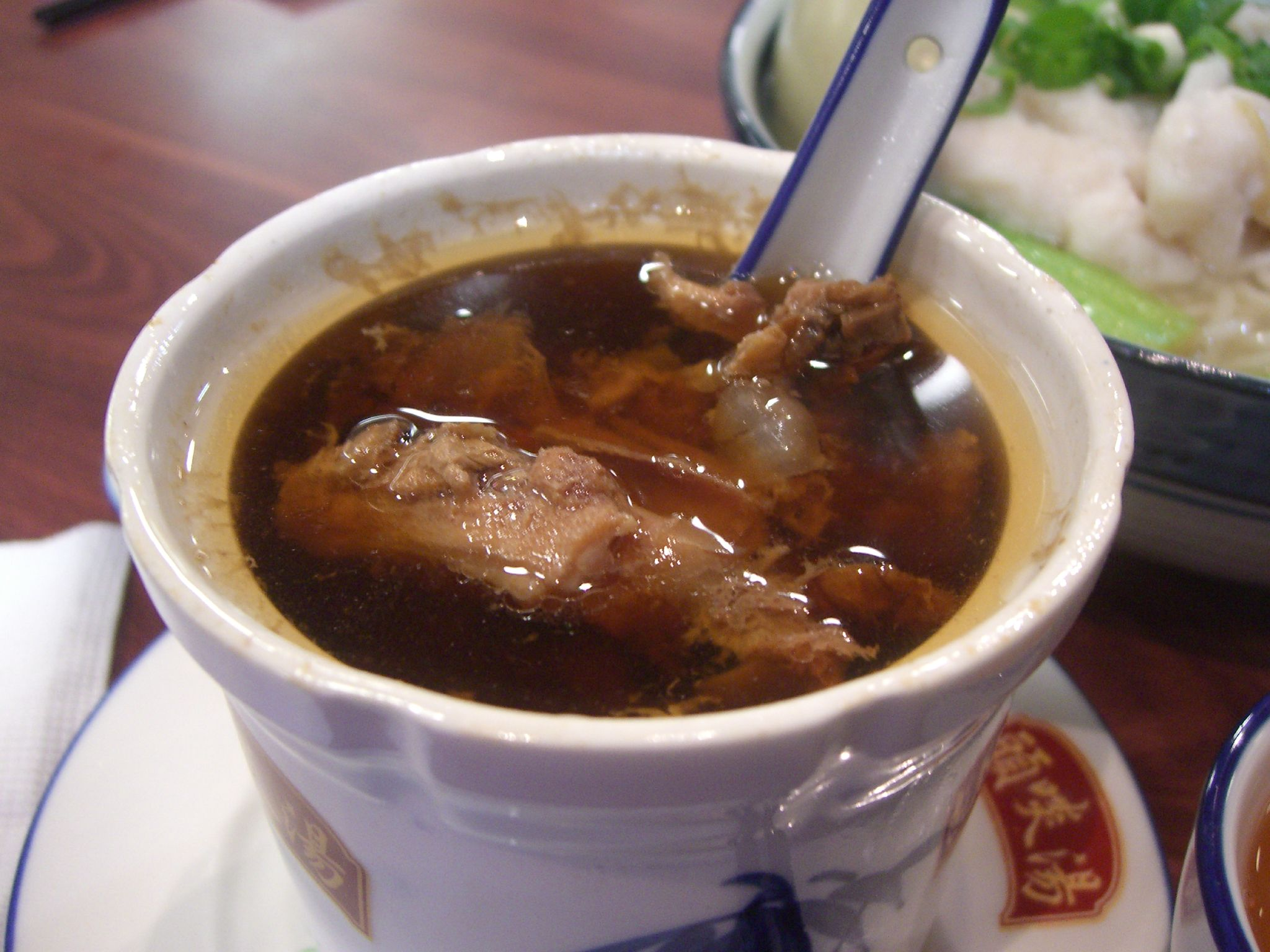
田七洋参炖老鸡 Tianqi (pseudo ginseng) and Ginseng Chicken Double-boiled Soup

== Korean ==
=== Samgye-tang ===
In Korea, there is a popular, Korean traditional ginseng chicken soup known as Samgye-tang (삼계탕; 蔘鷄湯) or Korean Ginseng chicken soup (韩式人参鸡汤) which is served in restaurants all over Korea. Samye-tang involves the stuffing of a young whole chicken with glutinous rice before being boiled in a broth of Korean ginseng, dried Chinese jujubes, ginger, and garlic.

=== Gallery ===
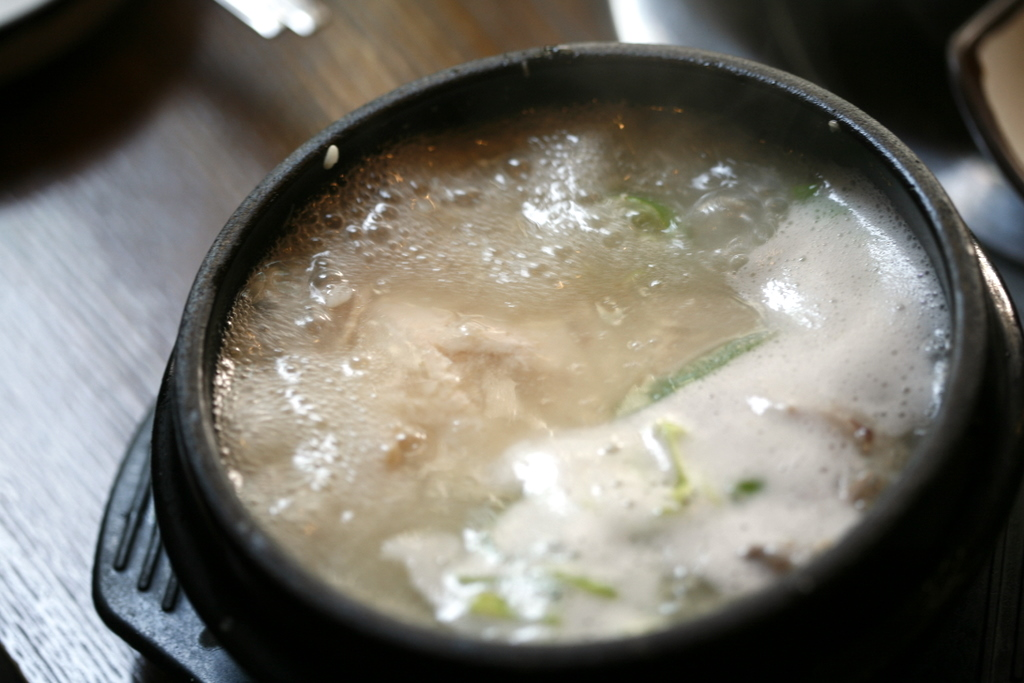
Samgyetang Chicken Ginseng Soup

== Malaysian ==
=== Chick Kut Teh ===
In Malaysia, there is a form of ginseng chicken soup called Chick Kut Teh (鳮骨茶). The Chick Kut Teh is a derivative of the traditional dish Bak Kut Teh (肉骨茶; lit. "meat bone tea"). The Bak Kut Teh was originally a dish made by Chinese immigrants in Malaya back in the 19th century. The Bak Kut Teh traditionally involves the combination of pork ribs with various spices and herbs and has ginseng as one of its key ingredients. The Chick Kut Teh is made by using chicken instead of the traditionally use of pork; the chicken is simmered in water, garlic, bak kut teh herbs, and mushrooms, tofu and goji berries.
