= Sprinter (film) =

2018 Jamaican sport film

- Film poster
- Directed by: Storm Saulter
- Written by: Robert A. Maylor Storm Saulter
- Produced by: Clarence Hammond; James Lassiter; Robert A. Maylor; Jamal M. Watson
- Starring: Dale Elliott; Usain Bolt; Natasha Kalimada; Kadeem Wilson; Lorraine Toussaint; David Alan Grier; Bryshere Y. Gray
- Cinematography: Pedro Gómez Millán
- Edited by: Zimo Huang
- Music by: Joseph Trapanese
- Production company: Overbrook Entertainment
- Release date: June 15, 2018 (American Black Film Festival)
- Running time: 114 minutes
- Countries: Jamaica; United States
- Language: English

Sprinter is a 2018 sports drama film which revolves around an athlete going through family issues, directed by Storm Saulter. Will Smith and Jada Pinkett Smith were the executive producers for this production. The film premiered at the 2018 American Black Film Festival where it won awards for Best Narrative Feature, the Audience Award in the category Best Film and Best Director.

== Synopsis ==
A Jamaican teen who is burdened by an unstable father and an unruly older brother hopes a meteoric rise in track-and-field can reunite him with his mother, who has lived illegally in the U.S. for over a decade.

== Cast ==
- Dale Elliott as Akeem Sharp
- David Alan Grier as Coach
- Lorraine Toussaint as Donna
- Kadeem Wilson as Germaine Sharp
- Bryshere Y. Gray as Marcus Brick
- Shantol Jackson as Kerry Hall
- Usain Bolt as himself
- Natasha Kalimada as UK Sprinter (as Asha Kalimada)
- Jessica Watkin as Sprint Runner
- Nirine S. Brown as Sprint Runner

== Accolades ==
American Black Film Festival (2018)

- Audience Award [Winner] – Narrative Feature category
- Best Director [Winner]
- Grand Jury Prize [Winner] – Best Narrative Feature category

Blackstar Film Festival (2019)

- Audience Award [Winner] – Best Narrative Feature category
