= ITPRID2 =

Protein-coding gene in humans

Identifiers
- Aliases: ITPRID2, CS-1, CS1, KRAP, SPAG13, sperm specific antigen 2, ITPR interacting domain containing 2, SSFA2
- External IDs: OMIM: 118990; MGI: 1917849; GeneCards: ITPRID2

Gene location (Human)
| Chr. | Chromosome 2 (human) |
| Band | 2q31.3 | Start | 181,891,730 bp |
| Band | 2q31.3 | End | 181,930,738 bp |

Gene location (Mouse)
| Chr. | Chromosome 2 (mouse) |
| Band | 2|2 C3 | Start | 79,465,696 bp |
| Band | 2|2 C3 | End | 79,503,310 bp |
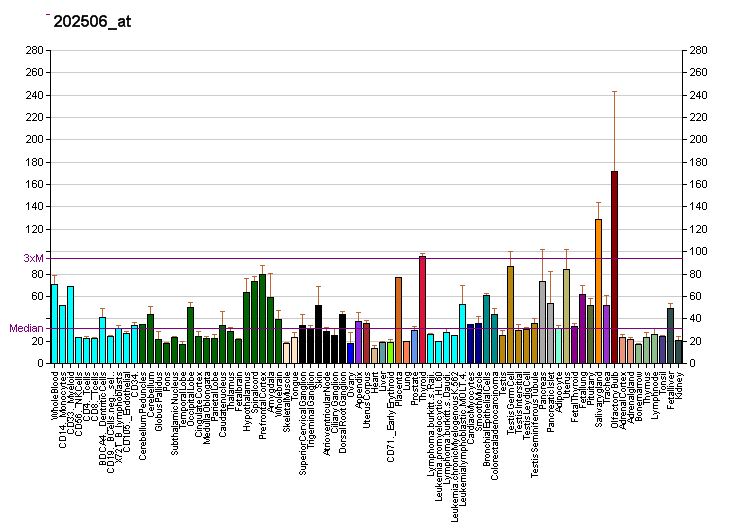
RNA expression pattern
| Bgee | Human / Mouse (ortholog); Top expressed in: body of pancreas; tibial nerve; stromal cell of endometrium; epithelium of colon; sural nerve; skin of thigh; rectum; hair follicle; skin of abdomen; right hemisphere of cerebellum / Top expressed in: skin of external ear; pyloric antrum; parotid gland; epithelium of stomach; sciatic nerve; skin of back; Epithelium of choroid plexus; mucous cell of stomach; ileum; brown adipose tissue; More reference expression data |
| BioGPS | More reference expression data |
Orthologs
| Databases | NCBI: entry; OMA: entry |
| Species | Human | Mouse |
| Entrez | 6744 | 70599 |
| Ensembl | ENSG00000138434 | ENSMUSG00000027007 |
| UniProt | P28290 | Q922B9 |
| RefSeq (mRNA) | NM_001130445; NM_001287503; NM_001287504; NM_001287505; NM_006751 | NM_080558 |
| RefSeq (protein) | NP_001123917; NP_001274432; NP_001274433; NP_001274434; NP_006742 | NP_542125 |
| Location (UCSC) | Chr 2: 181.89 – 181.93 Mb | Chr 2: 79.47 – 79.5 Mb |
| PubMed search |
- Wikidata
| View/Edit Human | View/Edit Mouse |

ITPR interacting domain containing 2 is a protein that in humans is encoded by the ITPRID2 gene (previously SSFA2).
