= Annette Lee =

Singaporean singer and filmmaker (born 1992)

- 李安
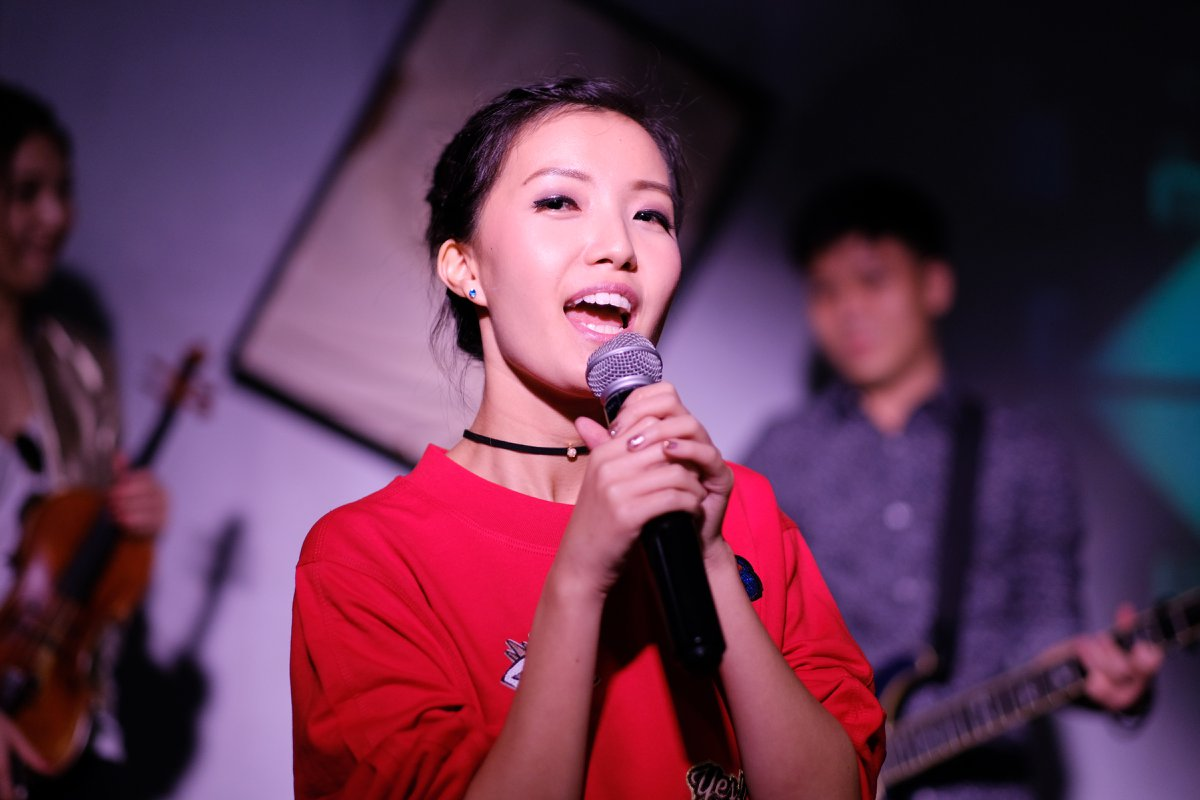
- Annette Lee, at her EP Launch at Canvas Club, Boat Quay, Singapore, on 4 November 2017
- Born: Annette Rochelle Lee; 10 July 1992 (age 34)
- Education: Saint Andrew's Junior College; Nanyang Technological University
- Occupations: Actress; Singer-songwriter; scriptwriter; director
- Years active: 2015–present
- Notable work: Dream Stall
- Spouse: Raphael Foo (m. 2017)
- Children: 1
- Musical career
- Genres: Electrofolk, Electro-pop, Power ballad, Rock
- Instruments: Piano, guitar
- Website: annettelee.sg

Annette Rochelle Lee (Note: Chinese: 李安; pinyin: Lǐ Ān) (born 10 July 1992) is a Singaporean singer-songwriter, scriptwriter, actress, and filmmaker. She is known for works such as "The Caifan Song" and Dream Stall.

Lee joined SGAG in 2015, under the persona "Sue-Ann", before quitting to create her own shows and comedic sketches in 2020. She plays various personae, such as Chantelle, whom she describes as an "entitled" social media influencer, and Susan, described as a "thrifty" auntie by Ruth Yeo of Channel NewsAsia.

In 2021, Lee released "The Caifan Song", a parody of ordering cai fan, as part of The Ann & Ben Show with Benjamin Kheng. She described the song as her "proudest achievement" in 2023, and was her breakout role, according to Chong Seow Wei of Tatler Asia.

In 2026, she debuted with the movie Dream Stall, about pursuing unorthodox careers in Singapore, which she wrote, directed, and acted in. It was released when Singaporeans were sceptical about locally produced films, and in response, she offered refunds to moviegoers who felt they had "wasted their time".

== Early life ==
Annette Rochelle Lee, known professionally as Annette Lee, is a Singaporean Peranakan. She was born on 10 July 1992. Lee studied at Cedar Girls' Secondary School and Saint Andrew's Junior College. She did a skit in primary school drama class where she acted as a peacock, influencing her to continue pursuing comedy, realising that she could make people laugh.

From 2011, she studied digital filmmaking at the Nanyang Technological University's School of Art Design and Media, graduating in 2015. During university, she performed cover gigs at local bars and cafés, being a vocalist in a two-man band. She also de-stressed with her personal blog, titled ifonlywefartflowers, as it was a faster way to tell stories than creating a fully-illustrated book.

== Personae ==
Lee plays several personae, which was inspired by Chris Lilley's similar antic, appearing in skits heavily rooted in Singaporean culture. For example, she plays Chantelle, (Note: Her full name is "Chantelle Tiffany Koh".) who introduces herself as "Singapore's most famous influencer", and is described as "pretentious" by Toh Ziyi of Channel NewsAsia, while Lee describes her as "entitled", "out-of-touch" and "annoying". Chantelle employs the English language poorly according to Her World. Chantelle was modelled after social media influencers who showcase their ideal lives to the world, allowing people to voice their opinions about social media influencers without identifying specific people. In 2023, she interviewed Yoo Jae Suk, Lee Kwang Soo, and Kwon Yu-ri with this persona, which was well-received by Internet users and celebrities such as Rebecca Lim.

She also plays Susan, who introduces herself as Auntie Susan, a thrifty persona created for her series named Asian Parent Tings. Susan uses an "auntie Hokkien accent". Susan was inspired by her mother who ran a "stereotypical Asian household". In 2022, she discussed about how names were pronounced in her "auntie Hokkien accent", with Joanne Peh, in this persona, which many Singaporeans found funny online.

== Career ==
Lee was first brought to the attention of SGAG from her blog, in which she drew comics and shared stories about her "fleeting existence". She joined SGAG in 2015, initially involved in its film-making process. However, she also had to act due to a shortage of manpower, such as under her "Sue-Ann" (Note: Her full name is "Sue-Ann Soh".) persona, a ditzy character who wears glasses, which was created to be dissimilar to herself. Sofiana Ramli of Time Out described the persona as "hilarious". In 2022, Lee was listed on Forbes’ 30 Under 30 list.

Since 2020, Lee had left SGAG and had created her own shows for her own platforms, as she wanted more autonomy to pursue her own work. Lee describes her motivation as being able to empower people into "life, hope and love" through her stories. She did not initially aspire to become a content creator as it was not a common occupation when she grew up. After working in media during post-university life, she stumbled into becoming a content creator. She posted short skits on Instagram and TikTok, and discussed adulting on YouTube in the Glowing Up series. Most of her content were comedic in nature; she finds bringing happiness to others most fulfilling. According to Her World, her social media posts are well-received.

In 2022, she performed her first major live show, involving comedy and music, at Esplanade, titled Annette Lee: All-In-One, to more than 10,000 people. She also co-hosts Adventure of the Day, a food and travel show about discovering different subcultures in Singapore such as hawker culture, with Zermatt Neo as of 2023, challenging the common Singaporean saying that "[there is] nothing to do in [Singapore]". As of 2023, she re-invested most of her earnings into her work, such as The Ann & Ben Show and Adventure of the Day.

=== As filmmaker ===
Lee's student short film Graduation (2014) (Note: Chinese: 外界; pinyin: wài jiè) won "Best Art Direction" at the Singapore Short Film Awards, and her thesis film Keep Mum (2015) (Note: Chinese: 爸爸不说话; pinyin: bà ba bù shuō huà) gave her a "Best Director" nomination in the National Youth Film Awards.

In 2022, Lee launched a mockumentary on YouTube, Asian Billionaires, following a wealthy family in Singapore managing their "rich people problems". She wanted to write about the issues that Singaporeans face regardless of wealth and use the mockumentary to "bridge [the] gap in the class divide" in Singapore. It attracted movie companies who suggested her to create a movie, but she did not give much attention to it.

==== Dream Stall ====
Dream Stall, (Note: Chinese: 梦想小店; pinyin: mèng xiǎng xiǎo diàn) an English-Mandarin drama-comedy film, opened in Singaporean cinemas on 27 May 2026. It is Lee's debut movie, which she wrote, directed, and acted in. It followed the suggestion of Anthony Chen, a Singaporean film director, to Lee in 2022 to create a comedy movie, similar to the American comedy Bridesmaids, which made her revisit her desire in university of making a movie.

The story follows Enya, a university graduate taking over her family's bak kut teh stall, previously managed by her father, who wanted to shut the stall down. It features two songs written and performed by her, Strangers' Land and Better Than Yours (The Bak Kut Teh Song). The movie was inspired by her own artistic journey and difficulties of young Singaporeans pursuing unorthodox careers, and the definition of success in Singapore's pragmatic society. The film celebrates Singaporean culture and she hoped that it would provoke thoughts about the speed of erosion of Singaporean culture, such as in cuisine and film.

The movie was released when cinema attendance was dwindling and locally produced films faced increasing dismissal. Lee attributed the attitude possibly to past bad experiences with local films, and believed that local filmmakers must regain audience trust. In response, she promised to refund watchers that felt that they "wasted their time". Internet users commended her certainty and eagerness to vouch for her work. Twelve people showed up at the feedback session at *SCAPE on 5 June 2026, of which only one person was refunded for his criticism of its filming location, humour, and use of Singlish.

== Music ==
Lee started teaching herself the guitar and how to sing from the age of 12. She also plays the piano. She started writing songs from the age of 15. She writes songs in the electro-folk and power ballad genre. Her EPs were written in the electropop and rock genre.

In November 2017, Lee released her first musical work, an EP titled All Our Achilles Heels. Her album was awarded the National Arts Council presentation grant. The title of the EP comes from the lyrics of the single "Ready for a Savior". It was created through her interest of the human condition, and how flaws and vulnerabilities reveal one's humanity. The songs came from her personal experience of handling anxiety and trying to describe happiness.

In 2020, she released her second EP titled Song for the Underdog. It was written as an encouragement to herself and her listeners, making a comparison to Aesop's Fable, "The Tortoise and the Hare", about how she could still succeed, despite feeling like she grew up in a challenging environment with a slow start. It includes "Gold", a pop song with country elements, about remaining hopeful for those struggling in life, which went viral on TikTok.

In 2023, she released "Send You Memes", (Note: Stylised as "send u memes".) a single about wanting to stay at home, which represented for introverts, but also for extroverts who sometimes feel introverted.

Lee is also known for The Ann & Ben Show, a comedy music video series created with another Singaporean artist, Benjamin Kheng. She wanted to see if she could make funny and relatable songs with Kheng, as they both had free time during the COVID-19 pandemic. The songs were received positively by Singaporeans.

The Ann & Ben Show includes the Mandarin power ballad, named "The Caifan Song", (Note: Chinese: 这个那个; pinyin: zhè gè nà gè) which was released on September 2021. It has a high production value according to Toh Ziyi of Channel NewsAsia. It is a parody video, about the mixed emotions when ordering cai fan in Singaporean life. It was received positively from Internet users and celebrities, who wrote that the tune was catchy. The song received 300,000 views on YouTube in three days, and as of June 2023, it received over 1.3 million views, "quickly [going] viral" according to Sophie Hong of Her World. Chong Seow Wei of Tatler Asia wrote that "The Caifan Song" was her breakout role. In August 2023, she described the song as her "proudest achievement", describing it as a seemingly simple concept that deeply connected with people.

== Personal life ==
In June 2017, Lee married Raphael Foo, a hedge fund manager. She gave birth to their son on 16 November 2022. Lee is Christian. She owned a Japanese Spitz dog named Jam, who died in 2022 at the age of 12. Lee enjoys watching movies, and likes thrillers and comedies. She also watches mostly light-hearted K-dramas. Her favourite books to read are comics and illustrated. She enjoyed watching documentaries growing up, such as Modern Family, as well as Ryan Higa on YouTube. She also keeps a journaling habit for introspection.

Lee also likes going for walks to various places, such as around town or to food centres. On weekends, she sets time aside for her son and for Sunday visits to church, avoiding the "noise" at work.

== Filmography ==
=== Films ===
Year	Title	Role	Type	Ref.
2014	Graduation	Director, writer, editor	Short film	
2015	Keep Mum	Director, writer	Short film	
2022	Asian Billionaires	Director, writer, actor	Web series	
2026	Dream Stall	Director, writer, actor	Movie	(Note: Golden Village Pictures; mm2 Entertainment Channel (7 May 2026). DREAM STALL 《梦想小店》 | Trailer — In Cinemas 27 May (Video). Event occurs at 1:59. Archived from the original on 23 July 2026 – via YouTube. "Starring ... Annette Lee; ... Original Story by Annette Lee; Screenplay by Annette Lee, Kew Lin; ... Directed by Annette Lee")

== Discography ==
=== Extended plays ===
Date of release	Title	Ref.
20 September 2017	All Our Achilles Heels	
2 October 2020	Song for the Underdog	
