= Singapore Short Film Awards =

Coordinates: 1.294606°N 103.849259°E

The Singapore Short Film Awards (SSFA) is an annual event which promotes and recognises excellence in short films in Singapore. It began in 2010 and was jointly organised by The Substation and Objectifs, presented by The Substation's Moving Images. Created by filmmaker Chai Yee Wei, former Programme Manager of The Substation's Moving Images Low Beng Kheng and current Co-Founder of Objectifs Yuni Hadi, the Singapore Short Film Awards highlights quality work done annually in the short film genre in Singapore - by seeking out new talent, reflecting current standards of the short film genre and to bring together both the veterans and the young talents as a community to create a space for networking and sharing.

Official Logo for the Singapore Short Film Awards

The SSFA programme traditionally includes a week-long schedule of film screenings and presents all Singapore shorts submitted during an open call for entries starting September to November of every year. The competition accepts films that have been made within the two years before the competition, but screened publicly only the year before the competition. There is a submission fee of $10. Screenings for SSFA are held at The Substation Theatre, with the exception of 2015, where screenings were shifted to The Projector. All screenings are entry by donation.

Each year, an Honorary Award is given to an individual or organisation whom had made significant contributions to the Singapore film community through their work in short films. The Awards Ceremony is held following the end of the week-long schedule of screenings, in attendance of a Guest-of-Honour who will typically present the Honorary Award.

During the first few editions, SSFA was the only platform that recognised excellence in short films in Singapore.

For its 6th edition in 2015, The Substation's Moving Images became the sole organiser of the Singapore Short Film Awards.

== 1st Singapore Short Film Awards ==
The 1st Singapore Short Film Awards was held from 25–31 January 2010. Out of 133 films submitted, 33 films were selected as nominees in 10 different categories, highlighting technical achievements, as well as performance. There was participation from both experienced professionals and students from schools such as Tisch School for the Arts (Asia) and Nanyang Technological University.

All film entries and nominees were screened at The Substation Theatre. The Awards Ceremony was held on 31 January 2010. With close to 100 invited nominees and guests attending, the ceremony's Guest of Honour was filmmaker Eric Khoo and the emcee was Singapore-based actress Yeo Yann Yann.

The jury panel comprised Malaysian independent filmmaker Liew Seng Tat, former board member of the Singapore International Film Festival Jasmine Ng, experimental filmmaker Victric Thng, National Museum's Cinematheque programme curator Warren Sin and TODAY newspaper journalist, Mayo Martin.

The event was supported by The Shooting Gallery, Infinite Frameworks and Face to Face.

=== Award Categories ===
There were not more than 5 nominees per category and there were 10 categories in total.

(winners in bold)

Best Director

Sun Koh - Dirty Bitch

Wu Ruojing - Home?

Basil Mironer - Rare Fish

Kirsten Tan - Cold Noodles

Jmin (Benjamin Tan) - The Girl with The Red Balloons

Best Animation

Tan Wei Keong - Hush Baby

Iyvone Khoo & Miguel Guzman - The Mothcatcher

Joo Choon Lin - Come out and Play!

Best Fiction

Kat Goh - Swimming Lesson

Sun Koh - Dirty Bitch

Basil Mironer - Rare Fish

Eric Elofson - Master of His Domain

Sulaiman Salamon - Fighting Fit

Best Documentary

Dana Lam - She Shapes A Nation

Wu Ruojing - Home?

Vicknesh Varan - Special Pass

Ghazi Alqudcy & Ezzam Rahman - Forgotten Merlion

Wan (Idzwan Othman) - Black Friday

Best Cinematography

Chananun Chotrungroj - Sink

Tay Yuxian - A Hole In The Bed

Isabel Wong Liliing, Lydia - Home?

Eugene Koh - Blue Date

Lim Teck Siang - Threshold

Best Editing

Kirsten Tan - Cold Noodles

Jack Haycox - 5 Films in an Anthology of a Film a Month

Daniel Hidajat - Outing

Alicia Yang & Danny Lim - My Underwear My World

Chen Junbin - The Girl with The Red Balloons

Best Script

Martin Hong - Dreaming Kester

Christopher Broe - A Perfect Harmony

Loo Zihan - Threshold

Eric Elofson - Master of His Domain

Best Art Direction

James Page - H The Happy Robot

Eric Lim - Public Phone

Rene Pannevis - Rare Fish

Jacen Tan - Rudra – Hymns from The Blazing Chariot

Eric Lin & Wong Munlai - The Robber

Best Soundtrack

Dirty Bitch

Threshold

Newton

The Karma of The Tree Sentinel Who Awakes

Best Performance (award not given)

Ong Xiu Ping – Madam Chan

Rebecca Dass – Bright

Oliver Mangham – Master of His Domain

Damus Lim - Brazil

A statement from the jury members reads, “The jury has enjoyed the performances in the nominated films in this category, but we feel that as the Singapore film community, we can push ourselves much further, and would encourage filmmakers and actors to rise to the occasion.”

Honorary Award

For outstanding contribution to the film community through short films

Royston Tan

== 2nd Singapore Short Film Awards ==
The 2nd Singapore Short Film Awards was held between 28 February- 6 March 2011. Organisers received a total of 126 entries, of which 55 were selected for nomination by a pre-selection committee that included filmmakers Jasmine Ng, Victric Thng and Kat Goh.

The award ceremony was held on 6 March 2011 at the Substation Theatre. Filmmaker Jack Neo was the guest of honour.

The jury panel consisted of award-winning Thai film producer, Soros Sukhum (‘Eternity’, ‘Mundane History’), filmmaker and last year's winner for Best Director and Best Fiction, Sun Koh (‘Dirty Bitch’), filmmaker Leonard Lai (‘The High Cost of Living’) and former Singapore International Film Festival director & programmer, Lesley Ho.

The event was supported by The Singapore Film Commission, The Shooting Gallery, Infinite Frameworks Face to Face, The Hong Leong Foundation Handburger and Sakae Sushi.

=== Award Categories ===
A new award category for "Best Experimental" was included.

(winners in bold)

Best Director

Scot Free – Chia Peizhen

Wake – Atsuko Hiranayagi

Timeless – K Rajagopal

Bani Ibrahim (Children of Abraham) – Raihan Harun

Masala Mama – Michael Kam

Special Mention: Jow Zhi Wei for Waiting

Best Animation

The Beat of The City That Freezed

Contained [Dir: Harry Zhuang and Henry Zhuang]

Evie

The Fish and The Ring

CMYK

Best Fiction

Checkmate

Wake

Bani Ibrahim (Children of Abraham) [Dir: Raihan Harun]

Timeless

Scot Free

Best Documentary (award not given)

Too Far North

Post-Love

Soi Chang: Elephants on the Streets

The Bird That Shakes The Jute Fields

Mrs Santha Bhaskar

The jury members provided a statement that read, “Documentaries should break new ground and inform the audience. They should deliver a strong message and a point of view.”

Best Editing

Epiphany – Lim Chee Harn

Flux – Nigel Heng

Void Decked – Zahra Shukor

Timeless – Shantha Kumar

Peep – Wesley Leon Aroozoo

Best Sound (award not given)

You Disappear – Reizuan Rosli

Nobody's Home – Teo Wei Yong

Sehari Sendiri – Jason Foster

The Beat of The City That Freezed – Joo Chon Lin

The Forest Spirits – Studio.MB

Special Mention: Contained for Sound Design

The jury released a statement that read, “Sound design is more than just putting music into a film. It involves a sound scape. Knowing when you need sound or music, when you do not need it, when it is enough is all sound design. All in service of the film. The jury regrets that they did not see this application of sound design in the nominated films”

The jury gave a Special Mention for animated film, ‘Contained’, for Sound Design. Jury member Leonard Lai said," ‘Contained’ has created a sound scape that the jury felt placed them in the same time and space as the character. We can feel the wind and waves through the sound design. We are pleased to have a special mention for sound design for ‘Contained’"

Best Art Direction

Mickey – Wesley Leon Aroozoo, Michelle Cheong

Wake – Atsuko Hirayanagi, Shirlyn Jennifer Wong [Dir: Atsuko Hirayanagi]

A Light In The Darkness – Yang Shuhui

Aemaer – Loo Zihan

Timeless – Yeo Ke Liang, Ellijay Sim, Cho Yeijin

Best Cinematography

Wake – Corey Kupfer

Timeless – Michael Zaw, Joel San Juan [Dir: K Rajagopal]

Mrs Santha Bhaskar – Alan Yap

Checkmate – M Senthil Nathan

Flux – Hanafi Mohd.

Best Performance

Checkmate – Paneeirselvam

Wake – Michael Lee

Masala Mama – Mohan Vellayan

Timeless – Sivakumar Palakrishnan

Kitchen Quartet – Sally Poh

Special Mention: Zheng Wei He for Waiting

The jury released a statement that said, "He does not appear to be acting, he does not act."

The jury members gave a Special Mention for the film, ‘Waiting’, under the Best Performance category and Best Director category. They felt that ‘Waiting’ was under nominated and it deserved to be nominated in these categories, commending the director for being bold in doing less rather than more.

Best Script

Scot Free – Jonathan Choo, Chia Peizhen

Masala Mama – Michael Kam

Summer and Its Rain – Joshua Simon, Marjorie Teo

Waiting – Jow Zhi Wei

Bani Ibrahim (Children of Abraham) – Raihan Harun

Best Experimental (award not given)

Peep

Mickey

Void Decked

Flux

Aemaer

The jury released a statement that read, “Experimental films should be experiments in the cinematic form and unfortunately the jury did not see any bold experimentation and breakthrough in the cinematic form.”

Honorary Award for outstanding contribution to the film community through short films

Wee Li Lin

=== MISE EN SIN ===
In conjunction with the awards, MIS EN SIN, the first-ever film poster exhibition of Singapore films, took place in the Foyer area and Random Room of The Substation. It was organised by SINdie, the only website in Singapore fully dedicated to Singapore independent films and filmmakers, and sponsored by Samuel Seow Law Corporation. The exhibition featured over 100 film posters from about 60 Singapore filmmakers, from the established to the up-and-coming. The exhibition aimed to educate the public about some of the lesser-known filmmakers producing quality work as most Singaporeans were familiar with only a handful of practising filmmakers, and to open up a new branch of film appreciation in Singapore, that of poster art. Visitors could own copies of the various posters for a small contribution to the filmmakers.

== 3rd Singapore Short Film Awards ==
The 3rd Singapore Short Film Awards was held from 5–11 March 2012. The awards ceremony was held on 10 March at The Substation Theatre. There were 113 entries with 20 of the films nominated across 10 categories.

All film entries and nominees were screened at The Substation Theatre. The Awards Ceremony was held on 10 March 2012 with filmmaker Kelvin Tong as the event's Guest-of-Honour.

=== Award Categories ===
Winner in bold

Best Director

Godaizer – Hillary Yeo

Hentak Kaki – James Khoo

Bliss – Liang Xuan

The Hole – Tan Shijie

Lighthouse – Anthony Chen

Best Animation

Godaizer

Libertas

A Cloudy Conundrum

Burger Burger

Tales of the Chugawagas

Best Fiction

Sisters

Bliss

Thin Air

The Hole

Lighthouse

Best Documentary

Peace Be Upon You

Wild Dogs

Existence

Unheard

Best Editing

Wild Dogs – Saravanan Sambasivam

Bliss – Liang Xuan

Existence – Jeanette Lim, Audrey Woon, Yap Jun Hua, Wallace Woon

Sanzaru – Nurul Ain Muslan

Sisters – Chen Junbin

Best Sound

Bliss – Jones Roma (Audio post, scoring and ending song ‘Mind Theater’)

Burger Burger – Huang Shicong, Gavin Tan Jun Jie

Sanzaru – Josephine Ng (Sound Editor), Calvin Phua, Jean Goh, Roy Ng Wee Kiat (Music)

The Hole – Fabrizio Paterlini (Music), Marc Wiltshire (Sound Recordist)

Best Art Direction

Godaizer – Hilary Yeo, Ray Toh

Love in Every Genre – Kartini Saat

Mandy's 8 Theories of Sleep – Roseane Kalavathi

Sanzaru – Ng Mun, Haslina Ismail

Best Cinematography

Bliss – Liang Xuan

Cut Adrift – Erwin Chua

Existence –Yap Jun Hua, Wallace Woon

Lighthouse – Benoit Soler

The Hole –Nathaniel Carton

Best Performance

First Breath After Coma – Marc Gabriel Loh (Fie)

Love in Every Genre – Yazid Jalil (Yazid)

Sisters – Molly Jan (Auntie)

Hentak Kaki – Michael Chua (Teck)

Bliss – Yobel Nathaniel (Nixon / Nick)

Best Script

Godaizer – Hillary Yeo

Sisters – Michael Tay

Hentak Kaki – James Khoo

Bliss – Sondy Crawfurd

The Hole – Tan Shijie

Lighthouse – Anthony Chen

Honorary Award For outstanding contribution to the film community through short films

Lesley Ho

== 4th Singapore Short Film Awards ==
The 4th Singapore Short Film Awards was held from 25 February to 3 March 2013. The Awards Ceremony was held on 2 March 2013, with Guest-of-Honour Janice Koh, Nominated Member of Parliament for the Arts. There were 103 submissions with 22 films nominated over 10 categories.

For the first time, a fringe event was organised with nuSTUDIOS, a student filmmaking society at National University of Singapore, where films of past SSFA nominees and award winners were screened. There was also a partnership with the Hong Kong International Mobile Film Awards 2012 (HKIMFA). SSFA and HKIMFA selected a nominated film to represent Singapore to compete with 10 other festivals around the world.

=== Award Categories ===
Winner In Bold

Best Fiction

Broken Crayon by Ang Geck Geck

Last One Standing by Naresh Subhash

All The Lines Flow Out by Charles Lim

Ying & Summer by Gladys Ng

Best Director

Ang Geck Geck for Broken Crayon

Liao Jiekai for Before the Wedlock House

Anthony Chen for Karang Guni

Charles Lim for All The Lines Flow Out

Gladys Ng for Ying & Summer

Best Sound

Justin Seah for Black and White and Silence

Zai Kuning, Zai Tang for Jalan Jati

Teo Wei Yong (Music Composer), Kevin Teoh (Sound Designer) for Seeya in Elektrik Dreamz

Evan Tan for All The Lines Flow Out

Teo Wei Yong for Wormhole

Best Cinematography

Liao Jiekai for Before the Wedlock House

Benoit Soler for Karang Guni

Feng Kexin for Seeya in Elektrik Dreamz

John Maloney for Ying & Summer

Charles Lim for All The Lines Flow Out

Best Script

Ric Aw for Villain

Karankuni for Last One Standing

Anthony Chen for Karang Guni

Ang Geck Geck for Broken Crayon

Nigel Soh for Girlphobia

Best Documentary

Before the Wedlock House

That's Wicked!

Durga

It's Not Worth It

John Clang

Best Animation No winner selected

A judge's statement provided a Special Mention for animated short Jalan Jati.

Drunken Moon

Family Dinner

The Hunt

Best Performance No winner selected

A judge's statement provided a Special Mention for 12 year old actress Brittany Low, for "...holding her own against veteran actor Vincent Tee in her role as Ying in VILLAIN.

Denise Goh for Ah Girl in Broken Crayon

Jenny Zhou for Ying in Ying & Summer

Lee Yew Kang and Kong Kee Wee for Coach and Kong Kee Wee in Last One Standing

Oon Shu An for Alexis / Natalie in Daffodil

Best Art Direction

Eileen Loh for Karang Guni

Ang Geck Geck (Production Designer) for Janaki

Cindy Khoo (Production Designer), Nigel Heng, Wyna Yow (Assistant Art Director) for Seeya in Elektrik Dreamz

Chermin Teo and Yang Ke Liang for The Fountains

Koh Kim Joo for Soap

Best Editing

Aisya Rila for Janaki

Joycelyn Lee for That's Wicked!

Charles Lim for All The Lines Flow Out

Fran Borgia, Diana Tang for Black and White and Silence

Juliana Tan, Wang Jingyu for Durga

Honorary Award

K Rajagopal

== 5th Singapore Short Film Awards ==
The 5th Singapore Short Film Awards was held from 24 February to 2 March 2014 at The Substation Theatre. The Awards Ceremony was held on 1 March 2014, with Ms Angeline Poh, Assistant Chief Executive of the Media Development Authority, as the evening's Guest-of-Honour. There were 111 submissions, of which there were 21 nominees over 10 categories. SSFA continued its relationship with nuSTUDIOS in holding a fringe SSFA screening of selected past year's nominees, as well as its partnership with Hong Kong International Mobile Film Awards in curating 1 Singapore film from its nominees to compete against 10 other countries.

=== Award Categories ===
Winners in bold

Best Fiction

Abang

Bird

Detour

Dill Doe

Tightrope

Best Director

Daniel Hui for Animal Spirits

Dzafirul Haniff for Abang *Special Mention*

Kristen Ong for Bird

Michael Kam for Detour

Wu Linfeng for Tightrope

Best Documentary

Animal Spirits

The Kings

On Such and Such A Day, At Such and Such A Time

Best Animation

The Ant and The Frog

Fly With Me

Milk

Best Performance

Jaden A. Zander and Muhammad Zulkifli Bin Mohammed Salleh for Abang

Maxi Lim for Dill Doe

Michael Chua, Presley Lim and Yolby Low for Detour

Michelle Lo for Bird

Nadiah M. Din and Nafisah Anwar for Tudung

Wang Lu Ying and Ren Xing for Tightrope

Best Script

Kristen Ong for Bird

Lauren Teo for The Lying Theory

Michael Kam for Detour

Nadiyah Rahmat for Tudung

Wu Linfeng for Tightrope *Special Mention*

Best Editing

Adam Choong for Bird

Ho Wei Joey for The Kings

Nelson Yeo for The Story I Forgot To Tell

Song Ying for Tightrope

Teo Qi Yu and Natalie Khoo for On Such and Such A Day, At Such and Such A Time

Best Sound

Burtt See and Inch Chua for Sunshine

Joshua Conceicao and Nicholas Chia (Original Music) for Giselle

Kristen Ong and Lincoln Yeo for Every Single Night

Shawn Wang for Bird

Teo Wei Yong and Nelson Yeo for The Story I Forgot To Tell

Best Art Direction

Adam Choong, Kristen Ong and Thilagan Narayansamy for Every Single Night

Martin Hong for Giselle

Tang Hui Huan for Tadpoles

Martin Hong, Shane Lim and Ian Kong for Orbits

Tracy Marie Lee for Pinch

Best Cinematography

Kelvin Chew for Giselle

Lincoln Yeo for Bird

Nelson Yeo for The Story I Forgot To Tell

Teo Qi Yu for On Such and Such A Day, At Such and Such A Time

Wong Xing Jie for Dill Doe

Honorary Award

Shooting Gallery Asia

== 6th Singapore Short Film Awards ==
The 6th Singapore Short Film Awards was held between 2–8 March 2015. Due to construction work on the SMU Law Building directly behind The Substation, the screening venue was shifted to The Projector. However, the Awards Ceremony was still held at The Substation Theatre, on 8 March 2015. Royston Tan and Tan Pin Pin were Guests-of-Honour at the event, presenting an Honorary Award to Yuni Hadi.

A special screening of the winning films was held at The Projector, on Saturday 14 March 2015, with most directors present for a Q&A following the screening.

There were 145 submissions - the highest ever for SSFA - with 27 nominees over 11 categories.

=== Award Categories ===
Winners in bold

Best Fiction

Bon Voyage

Last Trip Home

Stranger By Night

Chamber of Ox

Best Director

Alvin Lee / Bon Voyage

Grace Chew Hui Min / Destiny

Han Fengyu / Last Trip Home

Clare Chong / Stranger By Night

Tan Wei Keong / Pifuskin

Special Mention: He Shuming / And The Wind Falls

Best Documentary

The Longest Distance Relationship

Destiny

Chinese Housemaker

Family Recipe

Jia AKA Home

Best Animation

Afterline

Nascent

Cap’n Shmelly

Pifuskin

Best Performance

Juliette Yu-Ming / Dancer in Rite of Passage

Lim Poh Huat; Yulia Valerio, Russell Tan and Ram Rengachari / Stranger By Night

S. Sithira Thevi / Grandma in At Your Doorstep

Zhang Zheng Yang / Son in Last Trip Home

Teo Jun Jie and Lau Xiang Ying / Passenger

Best Script

Chen Yingxuan / Move Out Notice

Clare Chong / Stranger by Night

Kenny Gee / The Body

Shane Lim and Angelica Ho / November

Tan Seong / The Elephant Cannot Fly

Best Editing

Mads K Baekkevold / Chamber of Ox

Lau Xiang Ying / The Longest-Distance Relationship

Shelley Chan / Glitch

Ng Xi Jie and Julie Zhu / The Swan of Tuonela

Best Sound

Juliette Yu-Ming and Alexandre Brasil / Rite of Passage

Teo Wei Yong / Cap’n Shmelly

Avery Shen of Home Studio and Jesmen Tan / Bon Voyage

Ben Huff and Veronica Mullins / Nascent

Nick Talbot; Russell Adam Morton and Mads K. Baekkevold / Chamber of Ox

Best Art Direction

Michelle Cheong and Wendy Chee / At Your Doorstep

Keith Chong / Anchovies

Jerrold Chong and Ilana Kirschbaum / Nascent

Yi-Jun Ian / Graduation

Best Experimental

Pifuskin

Rite of Passage

You're Dead To Me

The Swan of Tuonela

Best Cinematography

Lim Beng Huat / Anchovies

Michael Zaw / At Your Doorstep

Jolinna Ang Sok Kun / Farewell Summer

Tang Hui Huan / Destiny

Seongbin Baek / And The Wind Falls

Special Jury Prize

Tang Kang Sheng / Passenger

Honorary Award

Yuni Hadi
