= Beyond Paradise =

Beyond Paradise may refer to:

- Beyond Paradise (TV series), a British crime drama television series
- Beyond Paradise (film), a 1998 American drama independent film
