= Singapore Space and Technology Think Tank =

Singaporean space organisation

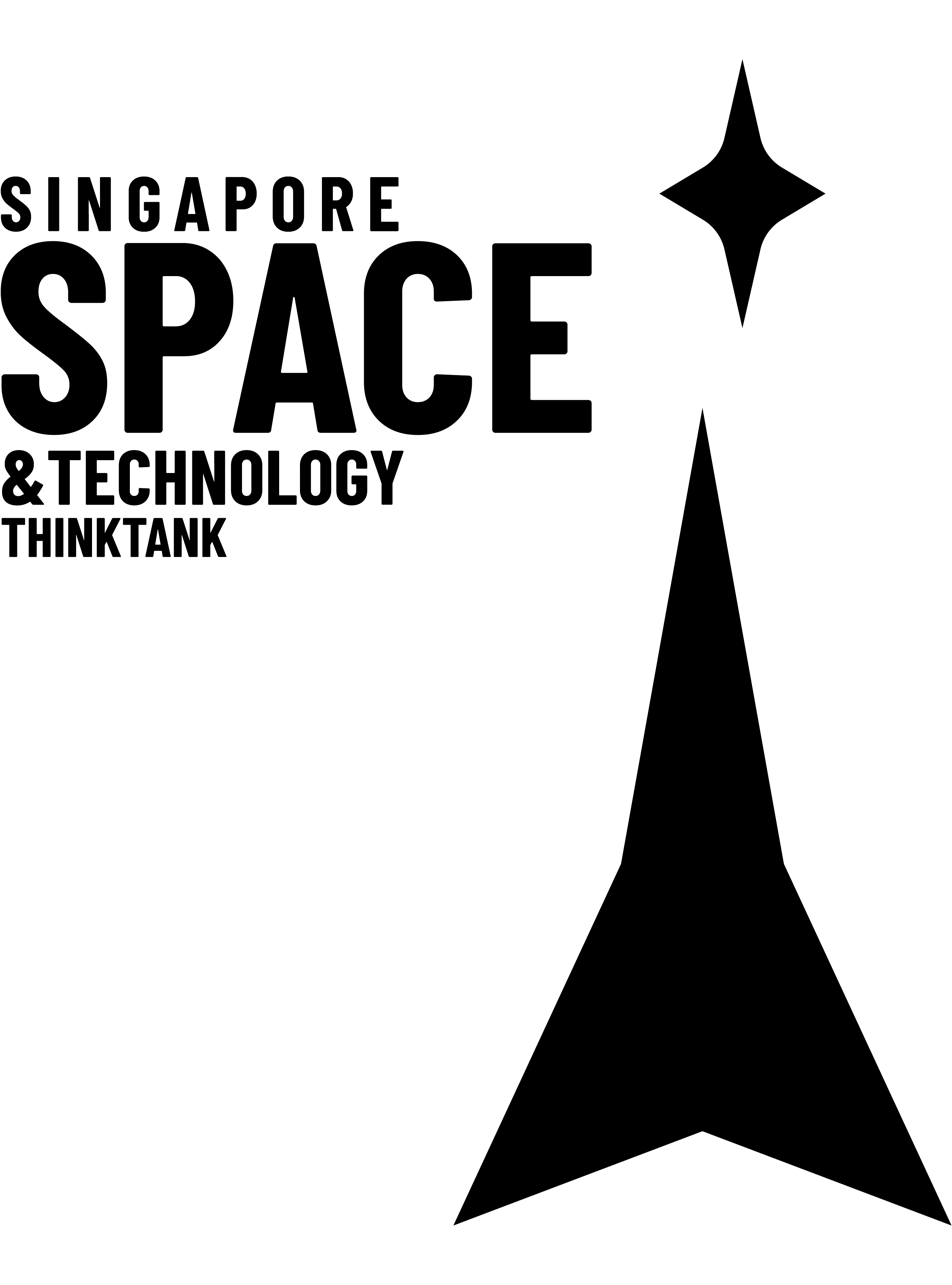
- SSTTT logo

Agency overview
- Abbreviation: SSTTT
- Former name: Singapore Space and Technology Limited; Singapore Space and Technology Association
- Formed: 22 February 2007; 19 years ago
- Type: Space agency
- Headquarters: 318 Tanglin Road (Phoenix Park), #01-39, Singapore 247979
- Administrator: Jeremy Chan
- Website: https://www.space.org.sg/
- Agency ID: 201937696M

Singapore Space and Technology Think Tank (SSTTT) or SST Think Tank is a non-governmental space organisation based in Singapore within the aerospace industry. SSTTT is a member of the International Astronautical Federation.

== SST Think Tank Council ==
The SST Think Tank Council is made of leaders from every major space region

Members of the council (2026)
Name	Position
Dr Kartik Sheth	Council Chair Former NASA Associate Chief Scientist
Candace Johnson	Founder of SES, Loral-Teleport Europe
Hidetake Aoki	Co-founder Spacetide
Jason Bender	Space Lead Partner, Deloitte Australia and Asia Pacific
Raha Hakimdavar	Professor and Senior Advisor to the Dean, Georgetown University

== Global Space Technology Conference & Exhibition (GSTCE) ==
SSTL organises the Global Space Technology Conference & Exhibition (GSTCE) annually in February. The GSTCE is the Asia's premier space and technology event, facilitating trade and regional collaboration for space, satellite businesses and beyond.

Speakers and Moderators for previous editions can be found here.

== Satellite launch program and experiment facilities ==
=== SSTL-JAXA Kibo launch agreement ===
On 15 November 2017, SSTL signed a contract with the Japan Aerospace Exploration Agency (JAXA) to launch the "SpooQy - 1" CubeSAT developed by the National University of Singapore (NUS) via the Kibo Program on board the International Space Station. SpooQy-1 will attempt to demonstrate quantum entanglement using a CubeSat in Low Earth Orbit (LEO).

== Industry programs ==
=== Asia Pacific Regional Space Agency Forum (APRSAF) ===
SSTL co-organises the regional rotational APRSAF conference with JAXA whenever Singapore plays host to the annual conference. It co-organised the 18th and 25th edition of APRSAF in 2011 and 2018 respectively.

=== SSTL Space Industry Awareness Talk ===
SSTL works in collaboration with the National Trade Union Council (NTUC) Employment and Employability Institute to organise space exposure talks to bring the space industry to the general public.

== Educational programs and outreach ==
=== Humanitarian Assistance and Disaster Relief Challenge ===
Across the world, countries have recognised the need of utilising remote sensing satellite technologies as a critical tool in real-time disaster management. SSTL launched the Humanitarian Assistance and Disaster Relief (HADR) challenge to invoice companies, start-ups, research groups or students and identify solutions to problems of coordination and technology usage within the context of HADR.

Current and previous participating organisations have included World Bank, GISTDA, and National University of Singapore.

== Venture building programmes ==
=== Space Accelerator Programme ===
In 2020, SSTL began a space-based accelerator programme in Singapore to support space tech startups in the sector. The accelerator programme is supported by Enterprise Singapore (ESG). Through the programme, SSTL works with local and international startups of varying maturity levels from pre-seed up to Series B, who are working on space hardware products and services. It currently has over 30 international and local startups in its program.

=== Project Cyclotron ===
SSTL, in conjunction with Cap Vista, have developed a specialised track called Project Cyclotron, which supports early-stage high-risk space hardware startups that are developing deep technologies.
