= Andrea De Cruz =

Singaporean actress of Eurasian descent

- Born: Andrea Heidi De Cruz; 24 June 1974 (age 52); Singapore
- Education: CHIJ Katong Convent; San Francisco State University
- Occupations: Actress, psychologist
- Years active: 1996–present
- Spouse: Pierre Png (m. 2003)

Chinese name
- Traditional Chinese: 愛麗
- Simplified Chinese: 爱丽
Transcriptions
Standard Mandarin
- Hanyu Pinyin: Ài lì

Andrea Heidi De Cruz (simplified Chinese: 爱丽; traditional Chinese: 愛麗; pinyin: Ài lì; born 24 June 1974) is a Singaporean actress and psychologist. She left Mediacorp when her contract ended, but continues to work on an ad hoc basis.

== Early life and education ==
De Cruz was educated at CHIJ Katong Convent and studied psychology at San Francisco State University.

== Career ==
De Cruz was a psychologist before going into show business. Although not from a Chinese-speaking background, she speaks Mandarin and has acted in Channel 8 dramas.

In 2021, De Cruz with Png opened a restaurant, Tipsy Flamingo, as part of the Tipsy Collective at Raffles City Singapore.

== Personal life ==
She married fellow MediaCorp actor Pierre Png in 2003.

=== Health issues ===
In 2002, De Cruz was a victim of the Slim 10 pills scandal and suffered from liver failure as a result. Png, who was her boyfriend at that time, donated part of his liver. She filed a lawsuit against various distributors of Slim 10 pills and fellow actor Rayson Tan. De Cruz began her court battle against the importers and distributors of diet pills that she says nearly caused her to die of liver failure.

Lawyers for De Cruz began arguments in the High Court seeking unspecified damages in a civil suit against Health Biz, the importer and distributor of “Slim 10" diet pills. The case was expected to last three weeks. De Cruz sought damages for injuries she alleged were caused by the drug and to cover the cost of her liver transplant surgery and treatment, court documents said. She also sued the pills' distributor, TV Media, and actor Rayson Tan Tai Ming who sold the pills to her. Tan was later cleared while the distributors were forced to compensate her. De Cruz took a 5-year break from acting and later stated that she has moved on from the incident. Over the years, she would have varying degrees of liver rejection despite taking immunosuppressants, including after her second COVID-19 vaccination jab in 2021.

In 2017, De Cruz was diagnosed with first stage cervical cancer and recovered from it. In 2019, she was unable to move the left side of her face due to a 3mm brain aneurysm.

== Filmography ==
=== Film ===
Year	Work	Role	Notes	Ref
1998	Tiger's Whip			
2000	Stories About Love			

=== Television appearances ===
Year	Work	Role	Notes	Ref
2001	The Reunion 顶天立地			
2001	The Hotel	Grace Wong		
2002	Springs of Life			
2002	No problem 考试家族	Li Ye		
2003	Blueprint: Scars			
2003	No Place Like Home			
2003	Making Love			
2006	The Shining Star			
2006	Rhapsody in Blue	Veron		
2007	My Dear Kins 亲本家人			
2008	Do Not Disturb - Lunch Hour			
2008	Phua Chu Kang 8			
2008	Our Rice House			
2008	Sayang Sayang	Nancy Tan		
2009	Sayang Sayang II	Nancy Tan		

=== Variety Shows ===
Year	Work	Notes	Ref
1999	Showbuzz Weekend		
1999	Executive Health		
1999	Head To Toe		
2001	Supermodel of the World/Singapore		
2002	Miss Singapore Universe 2002		
2002	All Change		
2003	The Nation’s Countdown 2003		
2003	Miss Singapore Universe 2003		
2003	Sun Moon Star		
2006	Global Picnic		
2006	Miss Singapore Universe 2006		
2006	President's Star Charity 2006		
2007	Miss Singapore Universe 2007		

== Accolades ==
Year	Award	Category	Nominated work	Results
2007	Asian Television Award		Do Not Disturb - Lunch Hour	Nominated
