= Phua Chu Kang Sdn Bhd =

- Starring: Gurmit Singh; Irene Ang; Harith Iskander; Adibah Noor; Nell Ng; Carliff Carleel; Fadzlie Rahim
- Countries of origin: Malaysia; Singapore
- Original language: English
- No. of seasons: 2
- No. of episodes: 26

Production
- Running time: 30 minutes (with commercials)

Original release
- Network: NTV7
- Release: 25 March 2009 – 2010
- Network: Mediacorp Channel 5
- Release: 6 October 2009 – 2010

Phua Chu Kang Sdn Bhd was a Malaysian sitcom and sequel to the Singaporean sitcom Phua Chu Kang Pte Ltd. Gurmit Singh and Irene Ang reprise the roles of Phua Chu Kang and Rosie Phua Chin Huay respectively. This sitcom was produced in collaboration with Mediacorp. This was the first time Singh and Ang appeared in a show entirely filmed and produced in Malaysia, with the rest of the cast featuring Malaysian actors.

== Plot ==
=== Season 1 ===
This sitcom continues from the events of Phua Chu Kang Pte Ltd. White-Collar Worker and General Contractor Phua Chu Kang (Gurmit Singh) and his secretary wife Rosie Phua Chin Huay (Irene Ang) leaves Singapore to expand their construction company and business being PCK Pte Ltd in Malaysia. He forges a partnership with millionaire Izzy (Harith Iskander) to turn PCK Pte Ltd into a more successful business, thus renaming it as PCK Sdn Bhd. Izzy's mother Fatimah (Adibah Noor) becomes a maid and domestic worker at Izzy's and Chu Kang's semi-detached house and Rosie's sexy sister Suzie (Nell Ng) moves in with them. In need of laborers to boss around, Chu Kang hires Bang (Carliff Carleel), a blue-collar worker laborer who is all brawn and no brain, similar to Chu Kang's former blue-collar worker laborers at PCK Pte Ltd in Singapore being King Kong (Charlie Tan), Ah Boon (Alwin Low), Ah Soon (Don Yap) and Ah Goon (Ray Kuan) from the prequel. Soon, Chu Kang's company is threatened as he learns that Izzy's younger brother Fazzy (Fadzlie Rahim) has his own construction business and is his main rival, similar to Frankie Foo (Lim Kay Siu), a general contractor and Chu Kang's former best friend in Sang Nila Utama Primary School and currently archenemies and business rivals from the prequel.

=== Season 2 ===
The finale continues with Chu Kang who is now suffering from amnesia. It also continues the events in the sequel known as Phua Chu Kang The Movie, in which only Neo Swee Lin, Lim Kay Siu and Charlie Tan from the prequel returned and reprised their roles as Phua Ah Ma, Frankie Foo and King Kong respectively, whereas the rest of the cast members including Pierre Png, Tan Kheng Hua and Marcus Ng Yi Loong did not reprise their roles as Anthony Phua Chu Beng, Margaret Phua Hwee Lian and Aloysius Phua respectively and that the rest of the supporting casts and guest appearances from both the prequel and this installment including Wendy Ng and Henry Thia also did not reprise their roles as Rosie's parents Ah Loon and Heng Pek respectively as well, same likewise for Harith Iskander, Adibah Noor, Nell Ng, Carliff Carleel and Fadzlie Rahman who also did not reprise their roles as Izzy, Fatimah, Suzie Heng/Phua, Bang and Fazzy respectively in the movie as well. However, Henry Thia did portray a new role being the main antagonist/villain named Lim Lau Pek in the movie.

== Cast ==
- Gurmit Singh as Phua Chu Kang, the general contractor, white-collar worker and CEO of PCK Sdn Bhd.
- Irene Ang as Rosie Phua Chin Huay, Chu Kang's wife who continues working as his secretary at PCK Sdn Bhd and enjoys playing mahjong, purchasing clothes, doing facial and going for slimwrap.
- Harith Iskander as Izzy, a millionaire who forges partnership with Chu Kang to make PCK Pte Ltd more successful in Malaysia and renaming the construction company's name to PCK Sdn Bhd and also Chu Kang's new business partner in PCK Sdn Bhd.
- Adibah Noor as Fatimah, Izzy's Mother and the maid working at Izzy and Chu Kang's semi detached house in Malaysia.
- Nell Ng as Suzie Heng/Phua, Rosie's Younger Sister and Chu Kang's Sister-In-Law whom is also Ah Loon (Wendy Ng) and Heng Pek's (Henry Thia's) Younger Daughter, and also staying with her elder sister Rosie, Chu Kang and Izzy in the former and latter's semi detached house in Malaysia.
- Carliff Carleel as Bang, a blue-collar worker laborer who is newly hired by Chu Kang to assist in the construction jobs for PCK Sdn Bhd, but unfortunately, he is all brawn and no brain, similar to Chu Kang's former blue-collar worker laborers at PCK Pte Ltd in Singapore being King Kong (Charlie Tan), Ah Boon (Alwin Low), Ah Soon (Don Yap) and Ah Goon (Ray Kuan) from the prequel.
- Fadzlie Rahim as Fazzy, Izzy's Younger Brother and a general contractor with his owned construction business and is also Chu Kang's main rival, similar to Frankie Foo (Lim Kay Siu), a general contractor and Chu Kang's former best friend in Sang Nila Utama Primary School and currently archenemies and business rivals from the prequel.
