= List of Phua Chu Kang Pte Ltd episodes =

Phua Chu Kang Pte Ltd is a Singaporean television sitcom that premiered on MediaCorp TV Channel 5 from 25 September 1997 to 11 February 2007. The series was created by Andrea Teo and written and produced by Ong Su Mann and Mediacorp Studios, starring Gurmit Singh as the titular character. A total of 166 episodes of Phua Chu Kang Pte Ltd have aired across eight seasons. The series' seasons and episodes are streaming online on YouTube and Mewatch.

== Series overview ==
Series	Episodes	Originally released	
Series	Episodes	First released	Last released
1	20	25 September 1997	5 February 1998
2	28	3 March 1999	8 September 1999
3	26	18 April 2000	10 October 2000
4	25	10 July 2001	25 December 2001
5	22	5 November 2002	15 April 2003
6	15	21 October 2003	27 January 2004
7	16	16 November 2004	1 March 2005
8	14	31 October 2006	11 February 2007

== Episodes ==
=== Season 1 (1997–1998) ===
No. overall	No. in season	Title	Directed by	Written by	Original release date
1	1	"Licence to Build"	Andrea Teo; Colin Cairnes	Michelle Susay	25 September 1997
Chu Kang helps out Margaret, his sister-in-law when she needs him to do a small job for her boss. To finish Margaret's job as soon as possible, Chu Kang is forced to push back Madam Chao's karaoke lounge projects, much to her displeasure. Rosie has her own scam on the side, telling Chu Kang's clients they need the help of a geomancer and raking in the money. On the homefront, Aloysius is not doing so well in his Mathematics at school, and Ah Ma tutors him, the old-fashioned way.: Title reference: Licence to Kill
2	2	"Crackpots"	Andrea Teo; Colin Cairnes	Cheng Hui Chin	2 October 1997
Chu Kang met at the crack pots.
3	3	"Have an Ice Day"	Colin Cairnes	Lee Yok Lin	9 October 1997
Chu Kang excited that a publishing company told him through the phone that wants to feature his house on the publisher's magazine although he insisted that he does not want to buy any magazines.: Title reference: Have a nice day
4	4	"Blood is Thicker Than Mortar"	Colin Cairnes; Andrea Teo	Alex Soh	16 October 1997
Chu Beng thinks Ah Ma favors Chu Kang.: Title reference: Blood is thicker than water
5	5	"The Return of Frankie Foo"	Colin Cairnes	Michelle Susay; Molly Teo	23 October 1997
Chu Kang getting shocked that Rosie sold his Italian towers to Frankie for $800.
6	6	"My Fair Chu Kang"	Eunice Tan	Cheng Hui Chin	30 October 1997
Chu Kang, accompanied by Chu Beng and Margaret, having dinner with the Smiths.
7	7	"The Alfalfa Incident"	Andrea Teo	Alex Soh	6 November 1997
While buying a meat at the shop, Margaret mets Choy Sim, who later tells her if she is gearing up for the Vegetarian Society's annual committee election.
8	8	"Tender Troubles"	Eunice Tan	Michelle Susay	13 November 1997
Chu Kang asked his old pal through a phone call to worked with him, but his old pal currently become a stuntman.
9	9	"Rosie's Red"	Eunice Tan	Alex Soh	20 November 1997
Chu Kang gets medical treatment. While playing mahjong with Doris, Tina and Mary, Rosie received phone call from the doctor who treated Chu Kang, informing on his health condition.
10	10	"The Ow Syndrome"	Eunice Tan	Cheng Hui Chin	27 November 1997
Margaret had to finish her son Aloysius' English homework. Chu Kang shocked that one of his subcontractors decided to quit.
11	11	"Man in the Dark"	Eunice Tan	Eunice Tan; Colin Cairnes; Cheng Hui Chin	4 December 1997
King Kong and Ah Goon accidentally broke Chu Kang's metal grill and asked them to fixed it again.
12	12	"Lock and Key"	Andrea Teo	Soo Sien Theng	11 December 1997
Chu Kang and Rosie gets shocked that the Sunshine Property is going to bankrupt and went defunct, while the Majestic Villa in Jurong also is going to close down.
13	13	"The Offer"	Eunice Tan	Cheng Hui Chin; Ong Su Mann	18 December 1997
Chu Kang tells Chu Beng that their client, Mr Koh wanted more bathrooms.
14	14	"Pests and Pretence"	Eunice Tan	Zara Lopez; Alex Soh	25 December 1997
Chu Kang getting shocked when his client, Parker Fong facing a termite problems. Rosie asked him to take along the mosquito repellant spray with him. Fong took his blame on Chu Kang over his furniture falling apart due to Chu Kang's parquet affected by termite infestation. Chu Kang asked Fong to renegotiate with him to address the problem, but Fong refused to pay him any single cent. A week later, Chu Kang and Chu Beng celebrates their mother's birthday.
15	15	"Wedding Woes"	Eunice Tan	Lynette Chiu	1 January 1998
The soon-to-be wed Greg and Wendy pay a visit to Chu Kang.
16	16	"Frankie's Foe"	Eunice Tan	Cheng Hui Chin; Soo Sien Theng	8 January 1998
Chu Kang mets his rival Frankie at a nightclub.
17	17	"Baby Blues"	Eunice Tan; Jennifer Tan	Alex Soh	15 January 1998
Chu Beng and Margaret celebrates their son Aloysious 11th birthday and presented him a Tamagotchi digital pets from Okinawa, Japan.
18	18	"Steam Me Up, Scheme Me Down"	Eunice Tan	Sam Lee Chern Hsien	22 January 1998
Chu Beng presented to Chu Kang and Margaret his replica of an old shop house, which Chu Beng described it as the 'preserved shop house', for his presentation to the project commiittee.
19	19	"Peace and Joy, Deadlines and Commitments"	Eunice Tan; Jennifer Tan	Alex Soh	29 January 1998
Chu Beng planned to designed a Housing and Development Board (HDB) bathroom with a state-of-the-art avant garde cocept for the upcoming Christmas Day.
20	20	"Red Packet Day"	Jennifer Tan	Soo Sien Theng	5 February 1998
The Chinese New Year are near and the Phua family make their preparations. Rosie tidy up some of items in store room. Margaret found her 21st birthday dress that Rosie kept in store room. Chu Kang wants his house to be brand new after being repainted.

=== Season 2 (1999) ===
No. overall	No. in season	Title	Directed by	Written by	Original release date
21	1	"School Ties"	Eunice Tan	Lillian Wang	3 March 1999
When Chu Kang finds out that his old school is going to be demolished, he has to try to put aside his differences with ex-classmate Frankie Foo to save the school. Meanwhile, Margaret has great aspirations for Aloysius' first school play and Rosie and Ah Ma busy themselves by joining a "multi-level marketing scheme".
22	2	"Pretty World"	Eunice Tan	Tan Wei-Lyn	10 March 1999
Rosie gets a chance to be her own boss when her ex-colleague from her "Watermelon Lounge" days offers Rosie a partnership at her new beauty salon, spa and massage centre. However, Rosie has to persuade Chu Kang, who has his hands full Chu Beng, Aloysius, Ah Boon and King Kong all get infected with chicken pox. Adding to his problems, Chu Kang is thrown into a dilemma when he spots Margaret in a compromising position with a strange man.
23	3	"Toto Chaos"	Eunice Tan	Ong Su Mann	17 March 1999
Chu Kang dreams of his father who gives him Toto numbers to buy. But, upon awakening, Chu Kang cannot remember the last number.: This is the only episode where Gurmit Singh took his role as Phua Chu Kang's ageing father.
24	4	"Computer Blues"	Eunice Tan	Soo Sien Theng; Alex Soh	24 March 1999
When Chu Kang gets a new computer, the whole family, and his two workers fight over it. Meanwhile, Margaret becomes interested in a Japanese soap opera.
25	5	"Rosie's Rival"	Eunice Tan	Ong Su Mann	31 March 1999
Rosie bumps into Adeline, an old rival who mistakes Chu Beng for Rosie's husband. Rosie persuades Margaret to play the maid to impress Adeline. Chu Beng is molested twice in a day.
26	6	"Good Fences"	Eunice Tan	Lillian Wang	7 April 1999
The Phuas have new neighbours, but things turn sour between the two families when they start off on the wrong foot. Chu Kang buys himself a new DVD player and new speakers, while Ah Ma gets hooked on the rich caffeinated aroma of espressos.
27	7	"Offside"	Eunice Tan	Esan Sivalingam	14 April 1999
Chu Kang turns tyrant when he becomes Aloysius' new football coach. Meanwhile, Margaret discovers that writing a fashion book is not as easy as it seems. And Rosie is on the hunt for a rude taxi driver who over-charged her by two dollars and ten cents.
28	8	"The Name of Ah Pa"	Eunice Tan	Soo Sien Theng	21 April 1999
Ah Boon's past is revealed when his father comes to Singapore to find him. He wants Boon to return to Brunei to help out in the family business. Ah Boon is reluctant to leave PCK Pte Ltd. Meanwhile, Ah Ma and Rosie bicker over video tapes.: Guest star: Kenneth Tsang as Ah Boon's father; This is Ah Goon's final appearance
29	9	"Foolish Heart"	Eunice Tan; Jennifer Tan	Ong Su Mann	28 April 1999
After a heart attack, Frankie Foo retires from contracting and gives all his clients to Chu Kang, who saved his life. Meanwhile, Margaret decides to start eating meat.
30	10	"Bowled Over"	Eunice Tan	Ong Su Mann	5 May 1999
Chu Kang's customer, a property developer, goes bankrupt and Chu Kang is stuck with 300 toilet bowls. Hence, the family is forced to go on an austerity drive. Ah Ma and Rosie decide to raise spending money of their own, so Ah Ma starts up an ice-kachang making class, and Rosie begins a job hunt. Meanwhile, Margaret is retrenched and ends up applying for the same job as Rosie.
31	11	"A Hair Raising Encounter"	Jennifer Tan; Eunice Tan	Soo Sien Theng	12 May 1999
Chu Kang is converting an old house into an old-folks home and strange things occur there. His workers are convinced the house is haunted. Ah Ma overhears discussions about the old-folks home and is sure that she is going to be put away. Meanwhile, Rosie tries out a DIY hair dye.
32	12	"French Connection"	Eunice Tan	Ong Su Mann	19 May 1999
After a fall, Chu Kang has amnesia and thinks he is French. He becomes attracted to Margaret while the rest of the family members hatch a plan to bring the old Chu Kang back.
33	13	"The Smell of Money"	Jennifer Tan	Simon Tan	26 May 1999
Chu Kang is in a state of panic when he realises he has ordered a whole container load of rosewood by mistake. The only way out is to hard sell it to customers, much to the dismay of Chu Beng, Ah Soon and King Kong. Rosie cares, but only about her own problems in trying to take a bite out of Margaret's new aromatherapy business. And Rosie's home-made concoction is well on the way to success, but not without Ah Ma's secret ingredient.
34	14	"Clockwork"	Jennifer Tan	Ong Su Mann	2 June 1999
Chu Beng has to get Margaret a wedding anniversary present at the last minute. Chu Kang gets Margaret to pose as Rosie for a client.
35	15	"As Sway As It Gets"	Eunice Tan	Soo Sien Theng; Muhammed Mahfuz	9 June 1999
Chu Kang goes through a bout of depression and thinks the whole world is against him when minor things start to go wrong and the family seem too busy for him. Meanwhile, Chu Beng has to find a cure for Margaret's pimples when she gorges on chocolates and her face breaks out.
36	16	"Your Business, My Business"	Eunice Tan	Sam Lee	16 June 1999
Chu Kang resolves a 10-year feud between two clients who are brothers competing to have nicer and more elaborate house renovations. Meanwhile, Margaret bumps into an old designer friend who wants her to model a see-through dress. Chu Beng is initially upset with her but begins to wonder if he is too conservative.
37	17	"Lucky Strike"	Jennifer Tan	Soo Sien Theng	23 June 1999
Chu Kang signs himself and Rosie up for a bowling competition, even though the latter is uninterested. Margaret is interested but Chu Kang wants her to prove her worth. Margaret ends up coaching an embarrassed Chu Kang when she bowls better than him.: Guest stars: Lin Ru Ping as Tina, Catherine Kee as Mary, Benjamin Ng as Jack and Sheila Wyatt as Doris
38	18	"Madam Wong Comes to Town"	Jennifer Tan	Joanne Teo	30 June 1999
Chu Kang finally fires Ah Boon and King Kong after a series of mishaps. Rosie's mahjong 'kaki' Madam Wong tries to recover the jade ring she lost to the former during a game. Also, Aloysius experiences his first crush.: Guest star: Selena Tan as Madam Wong
39	19	"Bloodlines"	Eunice Tan; Jennifer Tan	Ong Su Mann; Soh Leng Leng	7 July 1999
Ah Ma is visited by a long-lost friend who now roams the world as the 'Indiana Jones of Singapore'. Meanwhile, Rosie fears that Margaret is turning into a vampire.
40	20	"Big Brother is Watching You"	Daisy Irani	Lillian Wang	14 July 1999
A gang of kidnappers mistake Chu Kang for a multi-millionaire and Aloysius for his son. Complications ensue when King Kong unwittingly gets mixed up in the fray. At home, Ah Ma cannot figure out why her old recipe for 'Heavenly Maiden by the River Meets the Boatman of her Dreams' tastes so bad.
41	21	"Guest Control"	Jennifer Tan	Ong Su Mann	21 July 1999
Lawrence Chau cameos as the Phuas' house guest. But he stirs up ill feelings among the family members as his intentions to write a book about them are revealed.
42	22	"The Choi Luck Club"	Jennifer Tan	Esan Sivalingam; Sunita Sivalingam	28 July 1999
Chu Kang receives a chain letter but refuses to heed its warning. A few hours later, the Phuas are robbed and a spate of bad luck follows; Chu Beng loses a "video" he made of he and Margaret on their honeymoon, and Margaret does not receive an invitation to the fashion ball of the year leading her to worry that she is on her way out of the fashion loop. To protect the family from further intrusion, Chu Kang gets over-zealous in an attempt to set up an intricate home security system.: Title reference: The Joy Luck Club
43	23	"CK 2"	Eunice Tan	Tan Wei-Lyn	4 August 1999
Rosie's brother, Chin Kiat and fiancé, Hay Bee, visit and Chu Kang takes Chin Kiat under his wing, teaching him the tricks of the contractor trade and caused Chu Beng to feel that Chu Kang much prefers Chin Kiat's company to his. Meanwhile, Margaret and Rosie give Hay Bee conflicting tips on how to be a good wife. The problem is, Hay Bee feels that Chin Kiat much prefers contracting to her. She decides to run away.
44	24	"Kaya OK?"	Jennifer Tan	Joanne Teo	11 August 1999
Chu Kang struggles with a customer who will use anything, including his father to get a good bargain. Rosie thinks Ah Ma has found a boyfriend, and Margaret gets upset when she hears Chu Beng calling out for Isabella while he is sleeping.
45	25	"It's A Man's World Meh?"	Daisy Irani	Soo Sien Theng	18 August 1999
Rosie takes over PCK Pte Ltd and Chu Kang becomes her worker. At a client's house, King Kong falls head over heels for the maid. Meanwhile, Aloy's Chinese tutor quits a few days before his test and Ah Ma takes over as his tutor, using unconventional methods to teach him.
46	26	"The Full Monty"	Eunice Tan	Ong Su Mann	25 August 1999
Chu Beng gets involved in the nightclub business, but his plans for promoting it go awry, resulting in Chu Kang performing a strip show.: Guest star: Hamish Brown as Mikey
47	27	"Days of Being Young (Part 1)"	Eunice Tan	Written by : Soo Sien Theng; Story by : Boon Chin Aun	1 September 1999
Set in 1982, a flashback sequence reveals the history of PCK Pte Ltd. Chu Kang and Frankie Foo are two buddies working for the same boss (Joe Augustine) and fighting for the same girl, Rosie. Chu Beng calls home from Australia, where he is studying telling them he has to go on a field trip and Ah Ma takes it upon herself to raise more money for it.: This episode was produced as two-part season finale.
48	28	"Days of Being Young (Part 2)"	Eunice Tan	Written by : Soo Sien Theng; Story by : Boon Chin Aun	8 September 1999
It is still 1982: Chu Kang decides to establish a new contracting business his old buddy, Frankie Foo. Meanwhile, Chu Beng surprises the family by announcing that he will marry Margaret. David Yee cameos as Margaret's first boyfriend. The closing scene shows when PCK's signature Singlish comes under fire.

=== Season 3 (2000) ===
No. overall	No. in season	Title	Directed by	Written by	Original release date
49	1	"Cast the First Scone"	Colin Cairnes	Ong Su Man	18 April 2000
Chu Kang goes to school to improve his English proficiency, though he has completed the course. Margaret still wants to move out, but Chu Beng refuses. To change Beng's mind, Margaret invites an English teacher from the British Council to test Chu Kang's English. Meanwhile, Chu Kang decides to give his new worker Ah Goon an English test.
50	2	"Yumseng!"	Colin Cairnes	Ong Su Mann	25 April 2000
The Phua family attended a wedding dinner and Chu Kang challenges another guest of the dinner in a yumseng competition.
51	3	"The Wrestler"	Colin Cairnes	Imran Johri; Ong Su Mann	2 May 2000
Chu Kang trains Chu Beng for a wrestling contests which resulting the two brothers coming to blows.
52	4	"Prime Suspect"	Colin Cairnes	Sunita Hanson; Ong Su Mann	9 May 2000
After seeing Ah Goon on Crimewatch, Rosie is convinced that he is a criminal.
53	5	"Architect of the Future"	Daisy Irani	Wong King Wai; Ong Su Mann	16 May 2000
Chu Beng became difficult after won the Architect of the future award.
54	6	"Census and Sensibility"	Seah Wee Thye; Daisy Irani	Ong Su Mann	23 May 2000
Ah Ma buys a computer for Aloysius which Margaret became upset, and she feels Ah Ma has undermined her authority. Meanwhile, Rosie is struggling with the Population Census forms.: Title reference: Sense and Sensibility
55	7	"Excuse Me, Are You an Aquarius?"	Colin Cairnes	Tamil Selven; Ong Su Mann	30 May 2000
A fashion designer has designed a new line of clothes based on Chu Kang and persuades him to be the model.: Guest stars: by Lim Yu Beng as Ralphie Lau and Eileen Wee as herself
56	8	"When the Bough Breaks"	Jennifer Tan	Sunita Hanson	6 June 2000
Chu Kang is trapped in the bathroom with a client who's about to give birth, while Margaret and Ah Ma deals with an obscene phone caller.: Guest star: Pamela Oei as Mrs. Ong
57	9	"Fowl Play With Fishball"	Colin Cairnes	Ong Su Mann	13 June 2000
Chu Kang worries that Ah Ma is getting too attached to her new pet rooster that Rosie wants to get rid of. Meanwhile, Margaret thinks that Chu Kang and Rosie are plotting to killing her.
58	10	"birds&bees.com"	Jennifer Tan	Ong Su Mann	20 June 2000
Chu Kang decided to create his own website while Chu Beng struggles to telling Aloysius about the birds and the bees.
59	11	"Remains of the Dame"	Jennifer Tan	Ong Su Mann; Sunita Hanson	27 June 2000
Ah Ma's old pal stays at the house, but Rosie wants her out. Chu Kang has to decide whom to side with.
60	12	"Shocking!"	Sharen Liu	Imran Johri; Ong Su Mann	4 July 2000
Chu Kang gets an electric shock that allows him to see the future. Meanwhile, Ah Goon, believes that Margaret saved his life, proclaims himself as her bodyguard.
61	13	"The Go-Between"	Jennifer Tan	Ong Su Mann	11 July 2000
Rosie wants to drop a sexy client who's flirting with Chu Kang. The latter persuades her to let Chu Beng act as go-between instead. However, Chu Kang still ends up in bed with the client.: Guest star: Aileen Tan as Janet Yeo
62	14	"Of Moths and Men"	Jennifer Tan	Imran Johri; Ong Su Mann	18 July 2000
The day becomes dark and stormy night, and the Phua family thinks that they are being stalked by the group of serial killers. Chu Kang decided to kill first, rather than be killed.: Title reference: Of Mice and Men
63	15	"Drive Me Crazy"	Seah Wee Thye; Gloria Chee	Sunita Hanson	25 July 2000
Feeling unhappy with the PCK website created by Ah Ma, Chu Beng tries to get Chu Kang to hire someone professional who turns out to be an old less-than-trustworthy person.
64	16	"Dot Conned"	Seah Wee Thye	Ong Su Mann	1 August 2000
Rosie takes up driving and her instructor flirts with her. Meanwhile, Chu Kang has a client named Mr. Kong whom King Kong thinks is his uncle.: Guest star: Hamish Brown as Mikey
65	17	"Durian Durian"	Jennifer Tan	Wong King Wai; Ong Su Mann	8 August 2000
Rosie quits from PCK Pte Ltd and Chu Kang gets King Kong and Ah Goon to replace her. Meanwhile, Margaret loses her voice just before an important interview, and Ah Ma volunteers herself to play ventriloquist.: Jim Aitchison, Victor Khoo and Charlee makes a special appearances with uncredited roles.; Title reference: Duran Duran
66	18	"Camera Shy"	Jennifer Tan	Imran Johri	15 August 2000
Ah Ma and Margaret sought for the role of leading lady in Aloysius' new documentary. Meanwhile, Rosie has to decide on whether to come clean on a scam.
67	19	"'And the Winner is...'"	Colin Cairnes	Sunita Hanson	22 August 2000
Aloysius pretend himself to be Rosie's son in order for her to participate in a beauty pageant. However, Chu Beng and Margaret mistakenly think their son is slipping away from them and try to win him back.
68	20	"Back Out"	Jennifer Tan	Wong King Wai; Ong Su Mann	29 August 2000
When Chu Kang is bed-ridden after hurting his back, Rosie and Ah Ma fight over taking care of him. Meanwhile, Chu Beng decided to stand up to Margaret.
69	21	"Saving Private Phua"	Colin Cairnes	Seah Chang Un; Esan Sivalingam	5 September 2000
Chu Kang and Chu Beng get into a heated argument, and now it is war between the brothers Phua. Meanwhile, Frankie Foo tries to woo Rosie, and also teaches Aloysius self-defence as the latter stands up to a bully.: Title reference: Saving Private Ryan
70	22	"The Dating Game"	Colin Cairnes	Seah Chang Un; Esan Sivalingam; Wong King Wai	12 September 2000
It's Aloysius' first date and he is extremely excited about it. That is, till he tells Chu Kang, Chu Beng and Margaret and each offers their own dating advice.: Guest star: Margaret Chan as Mrs. de Silva; Title reference: The Mating Game
71	23	"Let Sleeping Dogs Lie"	Colin Cairnes	Sunita Hanson	19 September 2000
Chu Kang can't handle a client's canine bodyguard, and Ah Ma concocts a potion to knock him out. Meanwhile, Margaret's ex-boyfriend drops by for a visit.
72	24	"Mango Blind"	Colin Cairnes	Ong Su Mann; Jane Poh	26 September 2000
Rosie develops her craving for Margaret's Chilean mangoes. On the work front, Chu Kang and Chu Beng try to get a contract to renovate a hotel in Geylang.
73	25	"Melvin"	Colin Cairnes	Imran Johri	3 October 2000
Chu Beng gets in trouble after a drunken stupor with his buddies while Chu Kang's mole grows out of control. Meanwhile, Margaret fears Chu Beng may unable to perform his manly duties any more.
74	26	"What If?"	Colin Cairnes	Tan Wei-Lyn; Lillian Wang; Stella Wee	10 October 2000
Thing become haywire for the Phua family.

=== Season 4 (2001) ===
No. overall	No. in season	Title	Directed by	Written by	Original release date
75	1	"Crushing Experiences"	Jennifer Tan	Sunita Hanson	10 July 2001
Aloysius has a crush on his teacher and gets into trouble so he can stay in after school hours and be with her. Margaret has a near fatal accident that causes her to change her ways.
76	2	"Blind Justice"	Jennifer Tan	Stephen Yan	17 July 2001
King Kong's big toe is injured in a work accident and decides to instruct his lawyer uncle Pek Kong to sue Chu Kang.
77	3	"Andre"	Jennifer Tan	Stella Wee	24 July 2001
Aloysius is assigned to do a school project with Lynette, the girl he had crush on, in which they would have to play husband and wife. Meanwhile, Rosie decides to do something about Beng and Margaret's paltry contribution to the Phua household.
78	4	"Cooking Up a Storm"	Jennifer Tan	Stella Wee	31 July 2001
It's a busy time for the Phuas as Rosie and Margaret decide to write a cookbook together as Chu Beng gets a little too enthusiastic in helping Aloysius to build a volcano for his school project.
79	5	"Meet the Parents"	Jennifer Tan	Sunita Hanson	7 August 2001
Rosie's parents pay her a surprise visit and her mother wants a grandchildren. She questions Chu Kang's manliness.: Guest star: Henry Thia as Heng Pek
80	6	"Boys and Noise"	Sandy Phillips	Clare Chin; Esan Sivalingam	14 August 2001
Boon and Soon are back and together with Goon, they plan to revive their old singing group called The Goonies and perform in the Asian Talent Quest 2001, as well as their rival group In-Sink. Ah Ma enlisted herself as the group's manager while Margaret forces her way in as image consultant. Ah Ma change the group name from The Goonies to Tau Huay Boyz. When In-Sink insults Ah Ma, she makes a song and dance about it. She hopes of winning the trophy are dashed when they realised that The Tau Huay Boyz have been kidnapped by In-Sink.
81	7	"More Boys and More Noise"	Sandy Phillips	Clare Chin; Esan Sivalingam	21 August 2001
With The Tau Huay Boyz missing, Ah Ma and Chu Kang do the various schemes to get the boys back. However all does not go well according to plan. Kang kidnaps the cleaner. This forces Ah Ma to enlist Kang, Beng and King Kong as replacement. When Boon and Soon escape and coming back, Ah Ma replaces the still missing Goon with reluctant Aloysius, while Beng still trying to win his wife back.
82	8	"Family Heirloom"	Jennifer Tan	Stella Wee	28 August 2001
Ah Ma has a priceless family heirloom and can't decide whether to leave her inheritance to either Rosie or Margaret. Kang and Beng have to convince her who is more worthy to inherit the heirloom. Aloysius is under tremendous stress, he can't decide what to buy something for Lynette for her birthday. Margaret feels insecure that she looks older than Beng.
83	9	"Educating Ah Ma"	Sandy Phillips	Lynette Chiu	4 September 2001
Chu Kang have his best English lessons, while Ah Ma have her literature degree programme. Aloysius, on the other hand, has his own problems.
84	10	"Bye Bye Beng"	Jennifer Tan	Seah Chang Un; Esan Sivalingam	11 September 2001
Chu Beng agonises over a six-figure salary and Chief Architect position at a top architecture firm and staying at PCK Pte Ltd.
85	11	"New Architect"	Jennifer Tan	Seah Chang Un; Esan Sivalingam	18 September 2001
With Chu Beng no longer part of PCK Pte Ltd., Chu Kang is forced to go on a search for a new architect. Despite many wacky applicants, he finally stumbles upon the perfect architect, Ching Chong Keng.
86	12	"Belly of the Architect"	Jennifer Tan	Seah Chang Un; Esan Sivalingam	25 September 2001
Chu Kang suspects there's a double-dealing in the ranks when he mysteriously loses his clients one by one.
87	13	"Revenge is Sweet"	Sandy Phillips	Stephen Yan	2 October 2001
Chu Kang and Chu Beng are hard at work preparing a tender for a major new toilet subcontracting job. Chu Kang receives a telephone call from a mysterious ghostly woman telling him to close his company for 14 days or the consequences would be terrible. Chu Kang compiles, and Chu Beng is left in the lurch. Chu Beng vows to get to the bottom of the matter. With the help of Ah Ma and King Kong, the intrepid trio investigate the mystery woman and uncover Chu Kang's nemesis.
88	14	"Secrets"	Sandy Phiilips	Stella Wee	9 October 2001
Rosie decides to clear the storeroom. King finds his old childhood treasure, his collection of 'Captain Contractor and his Magic Screwdriver' comics. Aloy discovers that the comics are now worth a lot of money if they are in a minted condition. Beng borrows the comics and has an accident which results in the comics smelling far from 'minty'. The storeroom also unearths Rosie's 'box' which holds a deep dark secret from her past.
89	15	"That Thing"	Colin Cairnes	Sunita Hanson	16 October 2001
Kang tries to help King Kong get a girlfriend while Beng and Margaret are busy confronting the issue of sex with Aloysius.
90	16	"Bully"	Colin Cairnes	Charles C. Kim	23 October 2001
Margaret criticises Chu Beng for not having the guts to stand up for a bully who stole their cab. Chu Kang generously gives his advice to Chu Beng and tells him to take a Kung Fu class. But when Chu Beng takes the class, he quickly learns that he made a huge mistake. Meanwhile, Chu Kang's business has gone sour and ends up going into a bidding war against his old nemesis Frankie Foo over a customer who wants to renovate his three storey Semi-D.
91	17	"Crazy Thing Called Love"	Jenifer Tan	Stella Wee	30 October 2001
Ah Ma is behaving strangely and stays out late and smiles all the time. Kang finds out the reason - Ah Ma has a boyfriend. The Phua brothers are not happy that their mother is dating again. Imagine their reaction when they find out she's seeing someone younger than Beng. Meanwhile, Margaret discovers a Valentine card sent to her by a boy named Tiong Cheng 22 years ago. It drives her crazy that she can't remember who Tiong Cheng is.
92	18	"The Godfather"	Sandy Phillips	Stella Wee	6 November 2001
Kang is stressed from work and his insomnia. Nothing seems to be right with his current renovation project. Adding to his anxiety, everyone thinks his client Mr. Vito Koh Lee Onn is a godfather with a reputation for making people regret if they upset him. And if that wasn't enough, Aloysius goes around irritating everyone by playing silly Halloween practical jokes on them.
93	19	"For Art's Sake"	Colin Cairnes	Stephen Yan	13 November 2001
PCK Pte Ltd is hired to repaint a room in an arts and crafts school. Chu Beng joins a painting class in which he is asked to pose nude for the class. King Kong accidentally damages a valuable mural and Chu Beng is roped in to cover up the damage. Meanwhile, Margaret and Rosie unwittingly enrol themselves into the same knitting class. Chu Beng finally musters up the courage to strip and pose, but a series of errors culminate in more stripping than anyone bargained for.
94	20	"Auras and Curses"	Jennifer Tan	Stella Wee	20 November 2001
After encountered with a mysterious stranger, Rosie goes on a winning streak whilst Margaret is beset with bad luck. Rosie gets involved in an illegal high stakes gambling session while Margaret searches for the Swami. Meanwhile Chu Kang and Chu Beng are betting to see who has the more 'surrendered' wife.
95	21	"President PCK"	Sandy Phillips	Lilian Wang	27 November 2001
Margaret decided to run for the Phuas' housing estate Residents' Committee President. Rosie and Chu Kang scoff at her efforts but end up as rivals to Margaret and Beng in the Presidential race.
96	22	"My Mother, My Wife"	Sandy Phillips	Written by : Sunita Hanson; Story by : Lillian Wang	4 December 2001
A rich client falls in love with Rosie's voice and spends lots of money on his renovations.: Guest star: Zahim Albakri as George
97	23	"Health Matters"	Colin Cairnes	Clare Chin	11 December 2001
Health matters become a concern for the Phua family when a medical check up reveals that Chu Kang has gout while Chu Beng is iron deficient. Rosie and Margaret find themselves on trying turf as Rosie dabbles in healthy cooking for Chu Kang and Margaret contends with the no less than terrifying ordeal of stir frying beef for Chu Beng.
98	24	"War of the Sexes"	Sandy Phillips	Sunita Hanson	18 December 2001
Rosie and Margaret wants Chu Beng and Chu Kang to took over their jobs as both of them wanted to exchange their duties in one day.: Title reference: Battle of the Sexes
99	25	"I Do, I Do"	Jennifer Tan	Stella Wee	25 December 2001
Margaret and Chu Beng celebrates their wedding anniversary and she wants to celebrate it by renewing their wedding vows.

=== Season 5 (2002–2003) ===
No. overall	No. in season	Title	Directed by	Written by	Original release date
100	1	"The Zen of Chapteh"	Jennifer Tan	Stella Wee	5 November 2002
Kang's long standing primary school chapteh record has just been broken. Kang cannot get over the fact that he is no longer the Chapteh King and challenges the boy who broke his record to a ‘play off’. Unfortunately Kang discovers that he cannot chapteh any more because he has lost his ‘juju’. Bobo steps in as his spiritual advisor guiding Kang on his road to rediscover his ‘juju’. Meanwhile, Beng tries to convince Margaret to have another baby and Rosie freaks out when the hawkers at the market call her ‘Ah Soh’.: Guest star: Afdlin Shauki as Bobo
101	2	"Not the 7 O'Clock News"	Jennifer Tan	Stephen Yan	12 November 2002
Kang is asked to re-model the sets for a TV news channel studio. As is standard practice, his goofy workers mess up the job completely, causing the regular newscaster to trip and fall unconscious in the process. Not wanting to spoil his chances of getting a regular contract, Kang decides to take on the news reading role himself.
102	3	"The Parent Trap"	Jennifer Tan	Seah Chang Un; Esan Sivalingam	19 November 2002
Margaret notices that Aloysius and Lynette have been dating for a year now, and it is time she formally meets Lynette's parents. It also happens to be a good excuse to get to know Lynette's high society parents a little better and hopefully, this will lead to invites to posh functions and high-profile receptions with the beautiful people Margaret is just dying to rub shoulders with. But Margaret's plan falls flat when Lynette's parents end up having more in common with Kang and Rosie than her and Beng.
103	4	"Toto Day"	Jennifer Tan	Seah Chang Un; Esan Sivalingam	26 November 2002
Kang, to his shock and amazement, wins the Toto grand prize of mydollarxml 10m. Everyone starts making plans on how they are going to spend it. But he bursts their bubble by declaring he is keeping all the money for himself, closing down PCK Pte Ltd and moving to a seaside bungalow in Perth. The family slowly falls apart from greed and mistrust. And there is another minor complication. Every time Kang tries to collect his mydollarxml 10m winnings, he keeps getting knocked unconscious, and waking up to the very same day, over and over and over again. Kang's curse is that only he realises it is the same day being repeated, thwarting his attempts to get the money.
104	5	"The Revenge of Frankie Foo"	Sandy Phillips	Seah Chang Un; Esan Sivalingam	3 December 2002
The HDB is launching an island-wide upgrading of public toilets program and Kang is desperate to land this money-spinning contract. He is convinced that Frankie Foo is out to undercut PCK Pte Ltd with his usual underhand tactics. Rosie is not concerned though, as she is certain Frankie has migrated to Perth and poses no threat to Kang. However, King Kong has started dating Frankie's niece, Betsy. Kang is positive that she is only going out with him is so that she can spy on PCK Pte Ltd.
105	6	"Chilly Crabs"	Jennifer Tan	Stella Wee	10 December 2002
Kang invites a 'discount obsessed' client home to a free chilly crabs meal to clinch a deal. One thing leads to another and soon the Phua house is overflowing with angry ‘customers’ clamouring to have a taste of Ah Loon's famous chilly crabs. Rosie's father, Heng Peck comes to visit hoping to persuade his wife to return to Pulau Ketam. He goes crab catching with King Kong and Bobo, and Bobo discovers his hidden gift for attracting crabs.
106	7	"A Christmas Story"	Jennifer Tan	Stephen Yan	17 December 2002
In this re-working of the classic Charles Dickens short story, Chu Kang, who has become more miserly by the day, is visited by 3 angels of Christmas (of varying eccentricities) and learns the errors of his ways.
107	8	"Study No Enough"	Jennifer Tan	Seah Chang Un; Esan Sivalingam	7 January 2003
Bobo fears he's going to fail his Electrical Engineering exams that are coming up in a week. His home is too distracting and he has not been able to get past page 1 of his text book. Kang inadvertently invites Bobo to stay and study at the Phua home. This turns out to be more trouble than it is worth and Bobo finds it even more difficult to study. There is Rosie's constant spring cleaning around him, Aloysius and Lynette flirting on the phone, Margaret trying to get him to lose weight, King Kong trying to oust Bobo from the home in a fit of jealousy, and Kang and Beng's constant interruption with their lifelong feud over which superhero is better - Batman (Kang's favourite) or Spider-Man (Beng's favourite). Bobo finds it difficult to even get to page 2.
108	9	"Lord of the Bengs"	Daisy Irani	Seah Chang Un; Esan Sivalingam	14 January 2003
Kang bumps into his old neighbourhood buddy, Lee Kok Peng. Kok Peng is a typical Ah Beng, a little crude and coarse in his ways but good at heart. His "bengness" is still very much intact unlike Kang who over the years has shed several layers of "bengness" as he endeavoured to upgrade himself. This worries Kang and with Kok Peng's help, he embarks on a program to regain his "bengness".: Title reference: Lord of the Rings
109	10	"Cinema Phua-radiso"	Jennifer Tan	Seah Chang Un; Esan Sivalingam	21 January 2003
Kang buys some unlicensed VCDs from JB and thinks he has got a copy of Lord of the Rings. Instead it turns out to be a rather risqué movie. He gets an even bigger surprise when the lead actress in this movie of dubious artistic merit looks a dead ringer for Margaret. Things get worse when the VCD falls into Beng's hands. The brothers must decide whether to keep quiet about the matter or confront Margaret about her acting debut.
110	11	"Lucky Luohan"	Daisy Irani	Charles C. Kim	28 January 2003
Chu Kang complains about slow business despite the economic turn around. Rosie buys an expensive Luo Han fish to remedy the situation. Chu Luo Han and seeksKang becomes horrified by the fact that Chu Kang's dear Koi fish Mimi and Jasper will become jealous. Rosie believes in the 4-Digits number from its markings. The only problem is that she cannot see the number and only Margaret can. Rosie starts to spoil the fish by buying premium aquarium and fish food.
111	12	"The Year of the Goat"	Daisy Irani	Written by : Stephen Yan; Story by : Stephen Yan and Tammie Wong	4 February 2003
It is Chinese New Year again, and Kang owes a supplier money and has trouble returning the money. He fears this will bring him bad luck in the new year. This drives him to greater desperation by the day, until he takes the most extreme measures. Meanwhile, Rosie is also in her own way trying to promote good luck in the family by looking for an elusive yu-sang ingredient, only to find out later that all that glitters is not necessarily gold.
112	13	"The Girl Next Door"	Jennifer Tan	Stella Wee	11 February 2003
Kang and Beng reminisce about Ting Ting, the girl who used to live next door, and how she changed their lives. They both discover that they made the same promise to marry Ting Ting when they grew up, and end up arguing over who she would have chosen. Rosie and Margaret hire a private investigator to find her. They panic when they find out that Ting Ting is not only beautiful and successful but still single. They vow to make sure their husbands never get to meet Ting Ting. One day, Ting Ting shows up at their doorstep.: Guest star: Zoe Tay as Ting Ting
113	14	"I Want My HDB"	Sandy Phillips	Stella Wee	18 February 2003
King Kong is homeless and Kang reluctantly takes him in. He overstays his welcome and now Chu Kang has to find a way to get rid of him. Ah Loon suggests that King Kong gets married so that he can apply for his own HDB flat. Ah Loon even arranges for a girl, Wei Wei to marry him. All King Kong has to do is show up at the Registry of Marriages (ROM). Rosie and Margaret pose the question 'Do you love me enough to give me your liver?' to their husbands.
114	15	"When King Kong Met Wei Wei"	Sandy Phillips	Stella Wee	25 February 2003
King Kong regrets not marrying Wei Wei and tries to win her back. But he has to overcome Wei Wei's mother who wants to "pour hot water" on him. Chu Kang reluctantly becomes the couples’ chaperone when they go out on their first date. Margaret wants Aloysius to plan for his future and is shocked when he tell her that he wants to quit school and work for his uncle Chu Kang.
115	16	"Sabo You, Sabo Me"	Jennifer Tan	Seah Chang Un; Esan Sivalingam	4 March 2003
When Chu Beng puts down Chu Kang's ‘Contractor of the Year’ Award, and Chu Kang humiliates Chu Beng in front of a high class client in return, it kicks starts a series of pranks between the Phuas: Chu Kang and Rosie vs Chu Beng and Margaret. The pranks soon escalate from spiking drinks and making crude sounds, to serious sabotage when Chu Kang eats his pet koi, Jasper, Rosie gets stuck to the toilet seat, Margaret nearly loses her job, and Chu Beng's precious antique vase goes missing.
116	17	"At Wit's End"	Sandy Phillips	Tammie Wong; Esan Sivalingam	11 March 2003
When a new construction competitor rears its ugly head, Chu Kang institutes WITS (Work Improvement Teams), a cash incentive scheme to generate ideas on how to improve PCK Pte Ltd. But when the incentive cash goes missing, it starts a war between the distrustful and petty Phua Brothers, literally splitting the house in two. Meanwhile, Rosie develops a taste for gambling. Having won a few mahjong games in a row, she is under the impression that she is on a hot streak, which sets her off on a high-stakes gambling spree.
117	18	"The Adventures of Captain Contractor and Plumber Boy"	Jennifer Tan	Seah Chang Un; Esan Sivalingam	18 March 2003
In this alternate reality episode, the dynamic crime fighting duo of Chu Kang and Chu Beng must battle the evil Dr. Bungkus (Bobo), dastardly Diva Man (Ralphie), their incompetent yet wicked henchmen, Stinko Man (King Kong) and Stupid Boy (Ah Goon), while contending with the desperate SDU Woman (Margaret) and love interest, Lois Lian (Rosie).: This is the only series episode that does not have series intro and replaced with fictional episode intro.
118	19	"Mr. December"	Jennifer Tan	Ian David Row	25 March 2003
Chu Kang and Chu Beng go all out to get themselves featured in the 'Best Looking Men in Construction' calendar. But only one brother makes the grade. Meanwhile, King Kong and Ah Goon chance upon a durian tree that bears strange fruit.
119	20	"An Offer You Can't Refuse"	Jennifer Tan	Charles C. Kim; Seah Chang Un	1 April 2003
A pressured Chu Kang inadvertently insults the Godfather, Vito Koh. In return for his life, Kang has to baby-sit the Godfather's 8-year-old son Michael, for him. Ordinarily, looking after a little kid should be simple for Chu Kang. But because Michael is the son of the ruthless Godfather, Chu Kang knows he has to keep both eyes on the boy - which is exactly what he does not do. Things come to a head when he leaves Michael in the care of the clueless King Kong and Ah Goon and the boy disappears.
120	21	"PCK Goes to Malaysia (Part 1)"	Jennifer Tan	Seah Chang Un; Esan Sivalingam	8 April 2003
The roof of the Phua household is full of leaks and this turns out to be the perfect opportunity for Chu Kang to whisk the family away for a holiday. Margaret is expecting to go to a five-star resort on Pangkor Laut but they end up on a small and rickety shack on Pulau Ketam where Rosie's parents live. The living conditions turn out to be rather too spartan for Margaret's liking and they eventually all cry off to a luxurious spa resort on Langkawi followed by an eating tour of Penang. But disaster looms when King Kong, together with everyone's luggage, takes the ferry to Kuala Lumpur instead of Penang, with the rest of them stranded on Langkawi.: This episode was produced as two-part season finale.
121	22	"PCK Goes to Malaysia (Part 2)"	Jennifer Tan	Seah Chang Un; Esan Sivalingam	15 April 2003
Chu Kang, Rosie, Chu Beng and Margaret arrive in Kuala Lumpur in hopes of tracking down King Kong and their suitcases. Margaret in particular is desperate to retrieve all nine pieces of her exclusive Louis Vuitton luggage. As things would turn out, when the four of them split up in their search for King Kong, they only succeed in getting lost in four different parts of Kuala Lumpur.: Guest stars: Yusni Jaafar as old Fatimah, Radhi Khalid as bellboy, Patrick Yeow as CK/Gucci vendor, Douglas Lim as Kok Seng, Carina Ong as Kok Seng's wife, Christina Orow Shauki as the lady at KLCC, Casion Lee as bra seller.

=== Season 6 (2003–2004) ===
No. overall	No. in season	Title	Directed by	Written by	Original release date
122	1	"Phua Phua Baby"	Jennifer Tan	Stephen Yan	21 October 2003
Rosie is pregnant. As the family rejoices, Kang has to come to terms with the fact that he must now start visiting the gynaecologist with Rosie. Kok Peng and Beng try to help Kang overcome his fear of doctors. Aloy's prelim results did not qualify him for Junior College and he fakes going to school, until Marge decides to do some investigation. Meanwhile, Bobo works on his invention, the Robo-Bobo Quasimodo.: Title reference: "Ice Ice Baby"; Guest star: Mark Lee as Kok Peng
123	2	"Boy Oh Boy!"	Jennifer Tan	Seah Chang Un; Esan Sivalingam	28 October 2003
Kang's life is thrown into disarray when he realises his child might be a girl. He never took any of the steps to ensure the first-born Phua child would be a boy. In a bungling attempt to rectify the situation, he gets little boys to roll on his bed, puts roosters under his bed and even falls for Margaret's ridiculous ideas for ensuring a boy. Kang's efforts are further hampered by Bobo, who has decided to build a grand mansion (Mansion De Bobo) with his invention windfall. When Kang discovers that Bobo is shopping around for other construction firms, the friendship is hampered as both men get childishly sensitive.
124	3	"The Deal"	Jennifer Tan	Charles C. Kim	4 November 2003
Not able to withstand his desire to see the design of his new house, Bobo offers Kang a free trip to Las Vegas if he can deliver the design within a week. Kang keeps this deal secret and pushes Beng hard to work but Beng is reluctant since Bobo's new house will have 27 toilets and he is sick of designing toilets. Meanwhile, Rosie's pregnancy gives a natural glow to Rosie's face that impresses everyone except Kang. Margaret, who believes she had the glow of the century when she was pregnant, gets jealous.
125	4	"What About Me?"	Jennifer Tan	Stella Wee	11 November 2003
Rosie suddenly realises that her baby is taking over her life. She is sick in the mornings and nothing tastes good any more unless she splashes tabasco sauce all over it. It does not help that Kang has a crazy notion that her actions will affect the baby's appearance and insists that she ‘sits at home, do nothing and just wait for the baby to pop out’. To exert her independence, Rosie decides to take part in an arm wrestling contest. Meanwhile, Margaret finds out she is shrinking and obsesses over it and Bobo abandons his plans to build his mansion, opting instead for a tiny condo in the city with his one million dollars.
126	5	"Father Knows Best"	Esan Sivalingam	Seah Chang Un; Esan Sivalingam	18 November 2003
Kang is plagued by nightmares about Pa and fears he might turn out to be a cruel father just like him. The Phua boys reminisce about the ‘bad old days’ where Pa screwed up their first loves, career plans and generally quashed their self-esteem. They then hypothesize about the year 2013, and the type of person Kang's baby boy will grow up to be. The potential reality does not look good. The child may end up a thug like Kang or a sissy like Beng. Margaret is stunned when she finds out she will not be the baby's godmother. She feels it is revenge for not having made Kang and Rosie Aloysius's godparents. She goes to extreme lengths, from throwing a godparents party to learning mahjong from Rosie to singing a karaoke duet. All in a ‘lian’ effort to prove she's worthy of the ‘godmother’ title. Meanwhile, King Kong decides that if Bobo can be an inventor, so can he. This kick starts a series of ridiculous King Kong Inventions like the ‘Tau Huay XJ 2000’, ‘Anti-Bacteria So Bright Light Bulb 2000’ and even a ‘High Class Tiffin Carrier 2000’.
127	6	"Nature vs Nurture"	Serene d'Cotta	Charles C. Kim	25 November 2003
Kang and Rosie go all out to make sure they will have a smart baby when Marge tells them that their baby will be stupid since it will inherit Kang and Rosie's "cannot pass PSLE" genes. Ironically, Aloysius comes home with bad O level results and does not qualify for Junior College. Meanwhile, King Kong and Ah Goon buy a pedigree dog from their uncle with high hopes that they can train it to become a champion dog.
128	7	"Worst Case Scenario"	Jennifer Tan	Seah Chang Un; Esan Sivalingam	2 December 2003
It is the annual football grudge match between PCK United and Frankie Foo Warriors. Having lost every match to the Warriors since 1995, Kang is intent on doing anything to win including redesigning his koi pond for better feng shui.: Guest stars: Senario as Ram DMC (Saiful Apek as Ram, Azlee Jaafar as Daud, Mazlan Pet Pet as Mydeen and Wahid Mohamad as Chewbacca) and Patrick Teoh as Dickson; This is the only series episode that have Bahasa Malaysia dialogue with English subtitles.
129	8	"He Ain't Heavy, He's My Baby"	Serene d'Cotta	Stella Wee	9 December 2003
Rosie is getting bigger and more uncomfortable as each day passes. She complains to Kang all the time. Kang does not understand why she is making such a big fuss when it is ‘no big deal’ to be pregnant. Rosie bets with Kang that he cannot survive one day being ‘pregnant’. Kang agrees to wear a 10 kg belly bag for an entire day. Beng is dead set against working on a HDB kopitiam toilet upgrading job and does all he can to prevent Kang from submitting a tender for the job. Aloysius breaks up with Lynette but does not tell the family.
130	9	"All the President's Men"	Pepper See	Stephen Yan	16 December 2003
Beng is depressed about not having been president of anything in his life. Kang decides to help him become president of public toilets. Marge is livid about being First Lady of toilets and wants to get out. Rosie is trying to get the workers to clean out the office but to no avail, and decides to enlist the help of a small boy to teach them a lesson. Aloy is on a quest to get parental permission to become a rock musician.: Zureen Abd Rahman plays a small role as the scout in this episode.
131	10	"Livin' La Vida Rosie"	Esan Sivalingam	Seah Chang Un; Esan Sivalingam	23 December 2003
Ricky Martin is in Singapore, and Rosie goes to great lengths to win the ‘Spend an evening with Ricky’ contest, from learning Spanish, to cooking his favourite food to memorising his bio. Kang pretends to be mature about it but secretly does everything in his power to undermine Rosie's chances of ever meeting Ricky. Even though Kang loves one of Ricky's song "The Cup of Life", he does not see what the huge fuss is. He perceives himself to be just as sexy and talented as Ricky, if not, more so. Bobo is in complete agreement. He reveals his ‘Anti-Ricky’ campaign, ever since he got dumped by a girl because of Ricky Martin. Bobo intends to gate crash the concert and prove once and for all, who has the best "bon-bons". Margaret goes overboard when she realises that President S.R. Nathan will be attending a Public Toilet Launch, designed by Beng. Finally having the opportunity to elevate her social standing, she turns a small, charming evening into a night of operatic madness.: Special cameo appearance: Ricky Martin as himself; Title reference: "Livin' La Vida Loca"
132	11	"Bringing Up Ah Pah"	Pepper See	Stephen Yan	30 December 2003
Kang and Beng reminisce about the past and how their father treated them. King Kong finds a lump in his left breast and suspects breast cancer.
133	12	"Toilet of the Year"	Serene d'Cotta	Stella Wee	6 January 2004
There is a contest to choose Singapore's ‘Toilet of the Year’. Kang finds out that Beng is one of the secret judges, becomes a bookie and take in bets. He then tries to persuade, coerce and blackmail Beng into ‘fixing’ the results. Aloysius gets invited to be a stage hand and tour with a grunge group around Europe. Beng and Margaret agonise over whether they should let him go.
134	13	"I Adam, She Eve"	Serene d'Cotta	Charles C. Kim	13 January 2004
At a pre-natal class, Chu Kang watches a birthing video and realises, to his horror, that there will be blood involved when Rosie gives birth. Although his natural instinct is to run out of there, he vows to overcome his greatest phobia so that he can be there to welcome Phua Junior when he arrives. Meanwhile, there is a mad scramble for Aloysius' room when he announces that he is going to leave the nest to tour with a grunge band.: Guest stars: Sheikh Haikel as Adam and Annabelle Francis as Eve.
135	14	"Citizen Kang"	Jennifer Tan	Seah Chang Un; Esan Sivalingam	20 January 2004
Kang freaks out over PCK Pte Ltd's biggest net loss in history. Kang starts blaming everyone – Beng, Margaret, Rosie, King Kong, the pregnancy, SARS, Mimi, Jasper – anything except himself. Kang wants to institute severe cost-cutting measures – from no tau huay breaks to even cheaper materials to saving on stationery. After much persuasion, the Phuas decide to hire a professional and reputable financial consultancy firm that has turned many near bankrupt companies into profitable ventures and may be able to turn fledgling PCK Pte Ltd into a more productive company by trimming the fat. Enter Zack Ahmad who proceeds to paint differing scenarios for PCK Pte Ltd's business options and social strata. His economic spiels are constantly interrupted by Margaret and Rosie who fawn over his good looks and Bobo, who is on a vendetta to prove to his ex-classmate, Yusof, that he too is extremely successful now.: Guest star: Aaron Aziz as Zack Ahmad
136	15	"The New Phua"	Pepper See	Seah Chang Un; Esan Sivalingam	27 January 2004
The birth could be any day now. Betsy Foo makes a surprise appearance and tries to secure a confinement nanny job with the Phuas. But she gets sidetracked by King Kong who hopes to rekindle their short-lived ‘love affair’. Meanwhile, Margaret is intent on filming every aspect of the expectant mother and the birth, and starts annoying Rosie with a camera in her face. Beng has turned extremely kiasu and is in high gear getting Kang prepared for the birth. Beng regiments the trial runs with military precision and is dissatisfied with the timing. Kang manages to escape Beng's clutches and meets a client he hopes to secure in a multimillion-dollar deal. Minutes after signing the contract, Rosie's water breaks and turns the well planned, well oiled, well run operation into pandemonium.: Guest star: Patricia Mok as Betsy Foo

=== Season 7 (2004–2005) ===
No. overall	No. in season	Title	Directed by	Written by	Original release date
137	1	"Romeo Romeo, Wherefore Art Thou Romeo?"	Jennifer Tan	Seah Chang Un; Esan Sivalingam	16 November 2004
While trying get along with his babies, Chu Kang loses Romeo on his way to buy 4D. He seeks the help of King Kong and Ah Goon and hides from Rosie.
138	2	"He's the Wife"	Jennifer Tan	Seah Chang Un; Esan Sivalingam	23 November 2004
Chu Beng discovers that Margaret has accepted a job offer in New Zealand and is hurt that she did not tell him personally. Chu Kang encourages him to be a man and assert his husbandly rights.
139	3	"A Breathe of Fresh Air"	Jennifer Tan	Seah Chang Un; Esan Sivalingam	30 November 2004
Rosie tries to manage motherhood on top of her usual housekeeping duties, and her slimwrap, mahjong and facials. Chu Kang is left eating instant mee, and losing clients because he has to look after the babies. Rosie finally gives in and allows Kang to hire a maid. But the maid Chu Kang hires turns out to be nothing Rosie expected a maid to be.
140	4	"A Sip of Brandy"	Jennifer Tan	Seah Chang Un; Esan Sivalingam	7 December 2004
Chu Beng is excited that Margaret will be taking a short break from her filming commitments in New Zealand to celebrate their wedding anniversary together. Unfortunately, on the big day, Margaret calls to say she cannot make it back because of filming delays. Crestfallen, Beng decides not to waste all the food and champagne and asks Brandy to join him for a celebratory feast. She is swept away by the gentlemanly Beng, touched by his sensitive nature and develops a big crush on him. Brandy confides in Kang about this but does not name any names. Kang thinks Brandy is hinting to him that she has a crush on him. In the meantime, the over-imaginative Bobo and King Kong both think they have a shot at dating Brandy. Eventually chaos ensues as Kang, Bobo and King Kong besiege Brandy while she tries to cozy up to Beng.
141	5	"Workers Inc."	Jennifer Tan	Seah Chang Un; Esan Sivalingam	14 December 2004
Tired of being mistreated and yelled at by Kang, King Kong, Ah Goon and Bobo decide to form their own company (Happy Coconut Pte Ltd) and work for themselves. Kang, a little peeved at their insubordination, hires two ex-PCK Pte Ltd workers – Ah Boon and Ah Soon. PCK Pte Ltd operates out of the office and Happy Coconut operates out of the living room, and the pettiness and jealousy between the two companies reaches a fevered pitch when Happy Coconut, with Ah Goon's sexy image, gets them a lot of rich, tai tai jobs. But King Kong, Goon and Bobo are too lazy to actually work on these projects and sub contract it out to PCK. Kang's ego stops him from taking on the jobs, despite the fact that his company is in financial difficulty.: Title reference: Monsters, Inc.
142	6	"Full Body Massage"	Jennifer Tan	Seah Chang Un; Esan Sivalingam	21 December 2004
Kang and his workers notice Beng has been acting suspiciously of late. They suspect that he is having an affair since Margaret is away in New Zealand and he has spent years being under the control of Margaret. They follow Beng and are shocked to discover he has actually been going to a spa for facial treatments and body wraps. To them such effeminate behaviour is worse than an affair. Things take a turn for the worse when Rosie discovers that Beng might be using the spa as a front when she finds Beng's first girlfriend there posing as Mrs. Phua. Even Chu Kang hides a horrible secret – he becomes addicted to the ‘girly’ spa facilities.
143	7	"The Bengmobile"	Jennifer Tan	Seah Chang Un; Esan Sivalingam	28 December 2004
Margaret returns from her two-month stint in New Zealand, and is shocked to discover Beng has become more brash and confident. His new car purchase (without consulting her first), his new wardrobe (without consulting her first), his new talking back routine, all lead her to signing them up for a couples marriage retreat. Rosie, tired with Chu Kang taking her for granted and not talking to her the way they used to, decides to make it a foursome couples retreat. The men are not pleased to be at the resort and find ways of annoying their wives and the counselors until they discover that their marriages might really be in trouble. King Kong and Ah Goon, at home, tasked with feeding the fish, are bored and decide to step into Kang's and Rosie's shoes to sample a taste of how rich bosses live.
144	8	"No Retreat, No Surrender"	Esan Sivalingam	Seah Chang Un; Esan Sivalingam	4 January 2005
Chu Beng, tired of being constantly humiliated by Chu Kang every time he wants to borrow Kang's car, decides to secretly buy his own automobile. He loves it like a child and parks it a few doors away on the street, anything to keep the purchase from Kang. However, his secret is discovered by Rosie, Bobo and King Kong. They totally understand Beng's need for secrecy. Kang gets very petty and jealous when anyone buys anything new and shiny. They agree to keep Beng's secret from Kang, in return for many, tedious car rides, where Beng acts as their chauffeur. The plans hit a dead end when Chu Kang uncovers Beng's new purchase (from the loose lipped Bobo and King Kong) and torments Beng in secret by hiding his new car's engine.
145	9	"Healthy, Wealthy and Unwise"	Jennifer Tan	Jennifer Tan; Esan Sivalingam	11 January 2005
Margaret warns Rosie that her unhealthy eating habits could have adverse effects on her children in the long term. Rosie initially dismisses Margaret's claims, but then sees the light and goes overboard to prove that she does care about her family's well-being. She starts a mini-farm in the backyard, rearing healthy animals and growing organic vegetables only. Kang and Beng feel the brunt of all this healthy living and attempt to escape this torture by secretly gorging themselves at a hawker centre. However, their plans go awry when a needy client calls them over repeatedly to take care of menial problems like replacing toilet paper and grooming his cat.
146	10	"Are You Good Enough?"	Colin Cairnes	Seah Chang Un; Esan Sivalingam	18 January 2005
Margaret urges Kang and Rosie to get Romeo and Crystal places in a prestigious preschool even though they are less than a year old. It is the only way to ensure their children will get a good educational foundation. Kang and Rosie take her advice and soon learn that enrolling in the school involves a little blackmail as well. Soon the Phuas are constructing a new school wing, helping out in the cafeteria and garden, all in the hopes of getting their children places in the prestigious school. Meanwhile, Margaret is concerned that Aloysius's taste in death metal music is too morbid for his own good. Together with Beng, they try to reach out to their son by gaining an appreciation of the darker side of rock and roll.
147	11	"Rest and Relak"	Colin Cairnes	Seah Chang Un; Esan Sivalingam	25 January 2005
When Chu Kang is hit with a bout of hypertension, brought on by stress, he is forced to stay home and relax. However, he finds this a more difficult task than he had bargained for. From getting stuck in complex yoga positions to struggling with complex jigsaw puzzles, Kang starts feeling even more stressful by staying at home. Without his supervision, Chu Beng is left in charge of a prestigious project with dire consequences. When the toilet bowls are fixed the wrong way around and a series of mishaps occur, the client threatens to pull the business from PCK Pte Ltd. Not wanting to further stress out Kang, Beng enlists Margaret's help to schmooze the client and keep the job. However, the client becomes smitten by Margaret's charms and proposes to her.
148	12	"Who's the Boss?"	Colin Cairnes	Seah Chang Un; Esan Sivalingam	1 February 2005
Kang's ex-boss, Wong Tua Kee, makes a return and announces that he is retiring from construction. He plans to pass over all his contacts and projects to his favourite ex-worker, Chu Kang. But on one condition: Tua Kee wants Chu Kang to prove he is a good contractor by working with Tua Kee on a very small security guard hut job. Chu Kang is ecstatic and agrees. Things take a turn for the worse when Tua Kee makes Kang do menial construction work, makes King Kong and Ah Goon supervise Kang's work and starts treating Kang the way he used to in the past – with rudeness, insults and smacks to the head. Meanwhile, Margaret is upset that even though she and Chu Beng own 50% of the Phua house, the entire home barely has any of their influence. She secretly attempts to replace the living room's ah beng décor with some up-market art pieces.
149	13	"The Reunion"	Colin Cairnes	Stella Wee	8 February 2005
It is Chinese New Year. Kang devises an elaborate scheme to maximise Romeo and Crystal's ang pow takings. Margaret gets an unexpected visit from her sister Melissa, who makes a shocking request from her. Meanwhile, Beng has to deal with an irritatingly polite hotel clerk.
150	14	"Are You Man Enough?"	Jennifer Tan	Seah Chang Un; Esan Sivalingam	15 February 2005
Kang and Bobo are out to prove who is the more macho of the two. They embark on a Fear Factor-style bug-eating contest which Kang easily wins. Bobo accepts defeat graciously until he learns that Kang cheated by replacing his real bugs with chocolate bugs. Now Bobo wants to take the contest up a notch. Beng also wants in on the contest but he is shown little respect by Kang and Bobo so he resorts to a macho contest of his own by baking the lightest, fluffiest chiffon cake known to man. Meanwhile, Margaret attempts to get Aloysius and Lynette back together, but her plans backfire when she discovers he has been dating someone new.
151	15	"Save the Watermelon (Part 1)"	Colin Cairnes	Seah Chang Un; Esan Sivalingam	22 February 2005
The Phua family is at a loss when they discover that after 40 years, the renowned institution, Watermelon KTV lounge, will be closed down. The family hold many dear memories at the lounge – it is where Kang and Rosie first met and fell in love. After considering the options, they decide to buy in and take over the Watermelon lounge. It will soon be ‘PCK Pte Ltd – Construction & KTV’. However, they do not have enough cash to make the purchase alone. They enlist the help of Kang's old friend, Kok Peng, and a successful charming businesswoman – Candy Chew. Candy is an ex-hostess who now runs a Property and Lingerie conglomerate. Things start looking up as the deal is put to paper. But disaster strikes when the Phuas discover Candy has played them out and intends to demolish the Watermelon lounge and build a Spanish restaurant for higher profits.: This episode was produced as two-part season finale.
152	16	"Save the Watermelon (Part 2)"	Colin Cairnes	Seah Chang Un; Esan Sivalingam	1 March 2005
The Phua family is in a frenzy as they attempt to undo the damage caused by Candy and Kok Peng. They go to great lengths to get the lounge back – they use their brains, wit and the art of seduction – but nothing works. The family accepts that Watermelon is no more. Rosie refuses to accept the fact and soon, she and Chu Kang have barricaded and cuffed themselves to the lounge premises as the bulldozers approach.

=== Season 8 (2006–2007) ===
No. overall	No. in season	Title	Directed by	Written by	Original release date
153	1	"No Good Deed..."	Jennifer Tan	Ong Su Mann	31 October 2006
Chu Kang secretly meets with a reporter and a car tries to knock him down. He is puzzled as to who is trying to kill him and why. However Rosie is withholding a secret from Kang.: Guest stars: Wee Soon Hui as Martha Lum and Maia Lee as the reporter. Chong Kai Yang and Chong i-Ying portrays as Chu Kang's children Romeo and Crystal.
154	2	"Dunkin' Don'ts"	Jennifer Tan	Ong Su Mann	7 November 2006
Chu Kang builds a dunk tank for a charity fun fair, where he encounters an extremely disgruntled ex-client. Someone is going to get very wet.: Guest stars: Gerald Chew as Mr. Mah and Amy Cheng as Mrs. Mah; Title reference: Dunkin' Donuts
155	3	"Turn a Deaf Ear"	Jennifer Tan	Ong Su Mann	14 November 2006
Chu Kang becomes deaf but refuses to wear a hearing aid. He unwittingly assaults the new maid Rosie has hired. Another attempt is made on his life.: Guest stars: Cassandra See as maid agent and Umi Kalthum Ismail as Nora.
156	4	"Kill Kang"	Jennifer Tan	Ong Su Mann	21 November 2006
After a near-death experience, Chu Kang faces the vengeful archer bent on killing him and makes the ultimate sacrifice.: Title reference: Kill Bill
157	5	"Frankie's Final Folly"	Jennifer Tan	Stella Wee	28 November 2006
When Frankie Foo announces that he is marrying a former Miss Singapore Universe, a disbelieving Rosie hires a private investigator to find out the truth about the new bride.
158	6	"Crazy Like a Horse"	Kelvin Ha	Ong Su Mann	5 December 2006
Rosie and Margaret are upset that Chu Kang and Chu Beng are renovating the toilet at Crazy Horse. Rosie's worst fears are realised when Chu Kang ends up on stage with topless dancers.
159	7	"Incredulous Tale"	Kelvin Ha	Written by : Ong Su Mann; Story by : Grace Leong	12 December 2006
Utt introduces an incredible tale about Chu Kang and Rosie bringing home a mysterious unconscious woman who may not be what she appears.: Title reference: Incredible Tales; Guest stars: Utt Panichkul as himself, Suhaimi Yusof as Sergeant Dollah, May Wan Teh as elder sister and Choy Wan Teh as younger sister
160	8	"Under Another Roof"	Jennifer Tan	Ong Su Mann	19 December 2006
Tan Ah Teck returns to hire Chu Kang to do some renovations. Chu Kang has visions of being as fat as Teck. A series of misadventures culminates in Chu Kang challenging Singapore's reigning swimming champ Joscelin Yeo to a duel in the pool.: Guest stars: Moses Lim as Tan Ah Teck, Koh Chieng Mun as Dolly, Joscelin Yeo as herself, Carol Cheong as sex counsellor and Gabrielle Virk as granddaughter
161	9	"VR Man"	Ong Su Mann	Ong Su Mann	26 December 2006
Chu Kang plays a virtual reality game and is transformed into a CG version of himself while Rosie cannot stop eating hay bee hiam and gets a monstrous sore throat.
162	10	"Dark Side of the Loon"	Jennifer Tan	Ong Su Mann	9 January 2007
To get Rosie's mother Ah Loon out of his house, Chu Kang has to go to a KTV lounge to persuade his very drunk father-in-law to return to her. Margaret thinks her old friend Leslie is casting her in his new play.: Guest stars: Wendy Ng as Ah Loon, Henry Thia as Heng Pek and Vernon A. as Leslie. Geraldine Sim and Jacqueline Sue portrays as the KTV girls.
163	11	"To All the Girls..."	Gurmit Singh	Stella Wee	16 January 2007
King Kong is depressed he does not have a girlfriend. The others try to cheer him up by reminiscing about their past amorous encounters.: This is the first and only Phua Chu Kang Pte Ltd episode to be directed by Gurmit Singh in his directorial debut.; Zoe Tay, Fiona Xie, Patricia Mok, Sharon Au, Aileen Tan, Michelle Chong, Lydia Shum and Andrea De Cruz makes a special appearances in respective uncredited roles.
164	12	"Skit Contest Special"	Ong Su Mann	Ong Su Mann	30 January 2007
In this Skit contest episode, viewers get to watch the 5 skits written by viewers -'Kingkong's Job Interview', 'Aloy is Getting Married', 'Plasma TV', 'The Oldest Television In The World' and 'Curse of the Coconut'.
165	13	"The Return of the Kin"	Ian Seymour	Stella Wee	6 February 2007
A mysterious woman who claims to be Chu Kang's 'aunt' creates tension in the family as he prepares to celebrate the twins' first birthday and tries to impress a potential new client.: Guest stars: Neo Swee Lin as Ah Lee and Carole Lin as Mrs Choong
166	14	"Best in Singapore and JB (Note: Titled as "Series Finale Special".)"	Ian Seymour	Stella Wee	11 February 2007
In this one-hour special, Adrian Pang hosts the series wrap party, featuring the final episode of Singapore's longest-running sitcom, a chat with the cast themselves and other surprises.: This episode has an extended running time of 68 minutes.; Adrian Pang served as the host and narrator of this episode.; Neo Swee Lin and Lim Kay Siu as guest stars with special appearances by Fiona Xie, Michelle Chong, May and Choy.
