= Spouse for House =

- Genre: Sitcom
- Written by: Soo Hian Foo, Wei Lyn Tan, Joanne Teo, Lillian Wang
- Directed by: Aaron Tan Mien Shawn, Lee Chew Yen, Ong Kuo Sin
- Starring: Selena Lee; Alaric Tay; Desmond Tan; Irene Ang; Richard Low; Rebecca Spykerman
- Country of origin: Singapore
- Original language: English
- No. of seasons: 2
- No. of episodes: 12 for both seasons

Production
- Production location: Singapore
- Production company: Mediacorp

Original release
- Network: Mediacorp Channel 5
- Release: February 11, 2014

Spouse for House was a television sitcom on Mediacorp Channel 5 in Singapore. It is about a couple after their marriage.

== Cast ==
- Selena Lee as Jessica Tan
- Alaric Tay as John Tan
- Desmond Tan as Tan Kai Lan (Kai), John Tan's elder brother
- Irene Ang as Tan Soo Leng (Kitty), mother of John and Kai
- Richard Low as Tan Kok Wee, father of John and Kai
- Rebecca Spykerman as Vanessa De Souza, Jessica's best friend
- Carrie Wong as Sarah Toh, former girlfriend of Kai
- Sue Tan as Doris Lee, mother of Jessica
- Chen Tianwen as Eric Kwek

== Reception ==
In 2015, Chen Tianwen's parody music video titled "Unbelievable", as part of episode 2 in Season 2, was "lauded" for the nonsensical line "I so stunned like vegetable" [sic], drawing the attention of Time magazine. A second parody music video, "Sandcastle in My Heart", in which Irene Ang also starred, did not become as popular as the previous one. Both videos are a parody of popular Chinese MVs in the 1970s, particularly the work of Singaporean singer Huang Qing Yuan. The "Unbelievable" music video was top of YouTube's list of the top trending (non-music) videos in Singapore for 2015.
