= Kinohimitsu =

Beauty Brand

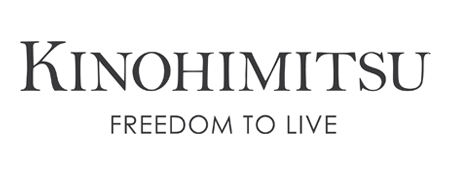
Kinohimitsu Brand Logo

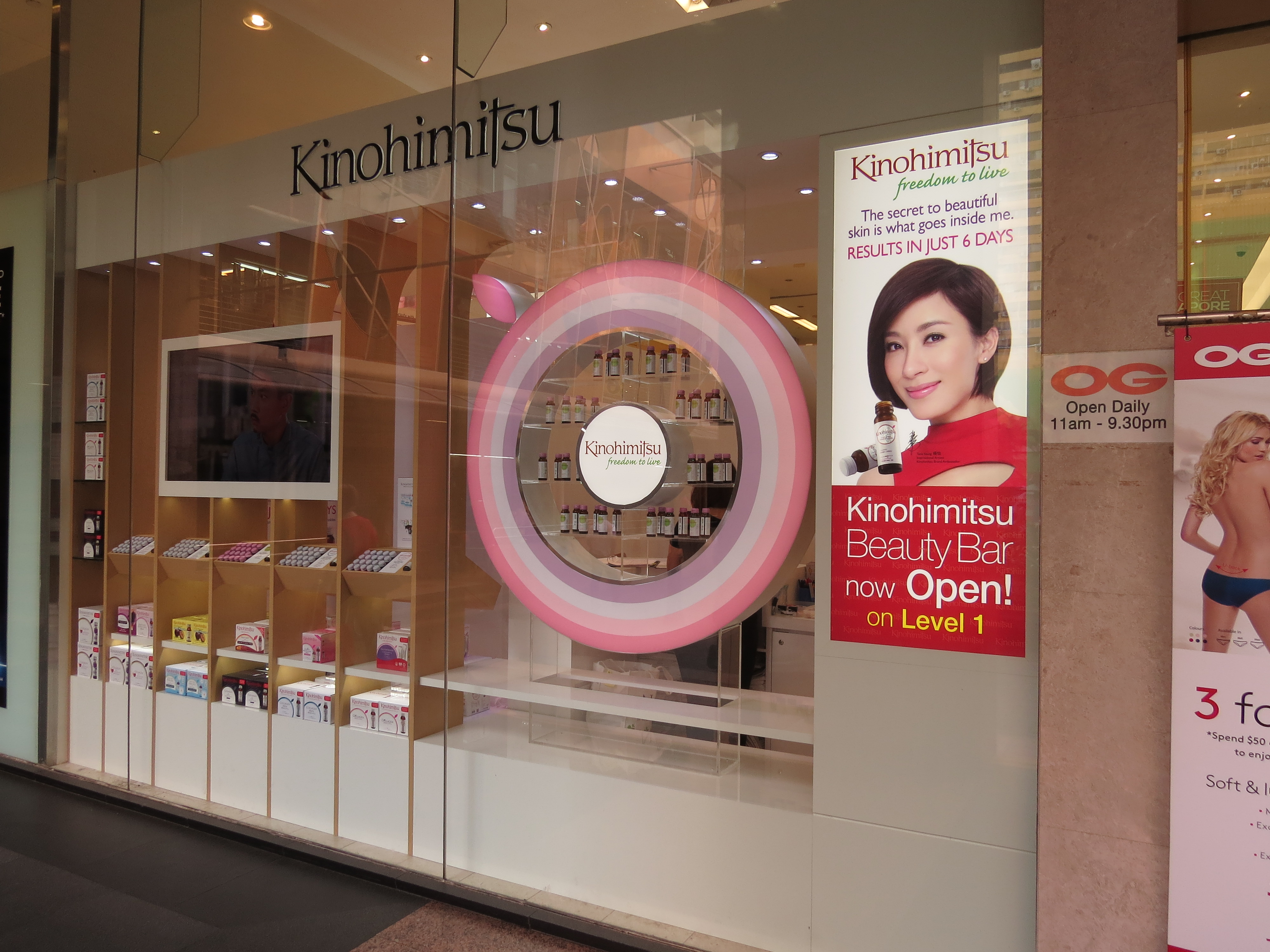
Kinohimitsu's Beauty Bar Counter at OG Albert Complex, Singapore

Kinohimitsu (木の秘密, Kinohimitsu) is a functional beauty and health brand owned by Kino Biotech, a leading integrated bio-nutraceutical and cosmeceutical public listed company in the Taiwan's GreTai Securities Market (GTSM) with its head office in Singapore. According to Euromonitor International, Kinohimitsu was the top selling beauty drink and collagen drink in Malaysia and Singapore between 2008 and 2010. The brand name, (木の秘密) means the secret of Nature.

== Business ==
Kinohimitsu has a distribution network of more than 6,000 points of sales in Asia, namely China, Singapore, Malaysia, Vietnam, Thailand, Cambodia and Indonesia. Kinohimitsu's products are sold in pharmacies, supermarkets and convenience stores.

In 2014, Kinohimitsu opened its first beauty counter in Singapore at OG Orchard Point.

== History ==
Kinohimitsu was established in 1998 and its Healthpad was the first product to be launched by Kino Biotech, which then was certified by US FDA as a medical device. Following the success of Healthpad, Hot Health Pad with Far Infra-Red was launched.

In 2001, Kinohimitsu launched Beauty Drink 2500 mg, which was the first collagen drink in Southeast Asia.

Kinohimitsu Collagen Diamond 5300 mg is most widely known, and it remains the company's best-selling product with over 1 million bottles sold worldwide.

Famous celebrities such as China's Vicki Zhao, Hong Kong's Tavia Yeung and Singapore's Phua Chu Kang and Carrie Wong have also endorsed for Kinohimitsu.
