= Where Got Problem? =

- Directed by: J.P. Tan
- Produced by: Anthony Ng
- Starring: Chen Xiuhuan; Lim Kay Siu; Neo Swee Lin; Wang Changli; Edmund Chen
- Production company: Sunnez Pte Ltd
- Distributed by: Shaw Organisation (theatrical); Warner Home Video (home media)
- Release date: 30 April 1999
- Running time: 106 minutes
- Country: Singapore
- Languages: English; Mandarin; Teochew; Hokkien
- Budget: $900,000

Where Got Problem? (Chinese: 问题不大!) is a 1999 Singaporean drama film directed by J.P. Tan, starring Chen Xiuhuan, Lim Kay Siu, Neo Swee Lin, Wang Changli and Edmund Chen.

== Cast ==
- Chen Xiuhuan as Coco Lee
- Lim Kay Siu as Lee Kay Seng
- Neo Swee Lin as Ng Bee Choo
- Wang Changli as Ng Kim Huat
- Edmund Chen as Chen
- Lee Weng Kee
- Yap Gut Ghee

== Release ==
The film opened in theatres on 30 April 1999. It was a box office failure, having grossed only $150,000.

== Reception ==
Susan Tsang of The Business Times wrote: "Despite quite a few hiccups, notably a script where everyone, bar the odd banker or tai-tai, is decent, Where Got Problem, like its characters, blithely carries on and pulls us along with it."

Edwin Yeo of The New Paper rated the film 3 stars out of 5 and wrote that the "competent" storyline is "hampered by technical problems", and that the "choppy" editing "distracts" from the "credible" performances of Lim and Neo.

Lynn Seah of The Straits Times wrote: "Uneven acting and intrusive product placements add to the troubles of the latest Singapore big-screen offering", and praised the performances of Wang, Chen Xiuhuan and Yap while criticising the performances of Lim, Neo and Edmund Chen.
