= Irene Ang =

Singaporean actress, comedian, host and entrepreneur (born 1969)

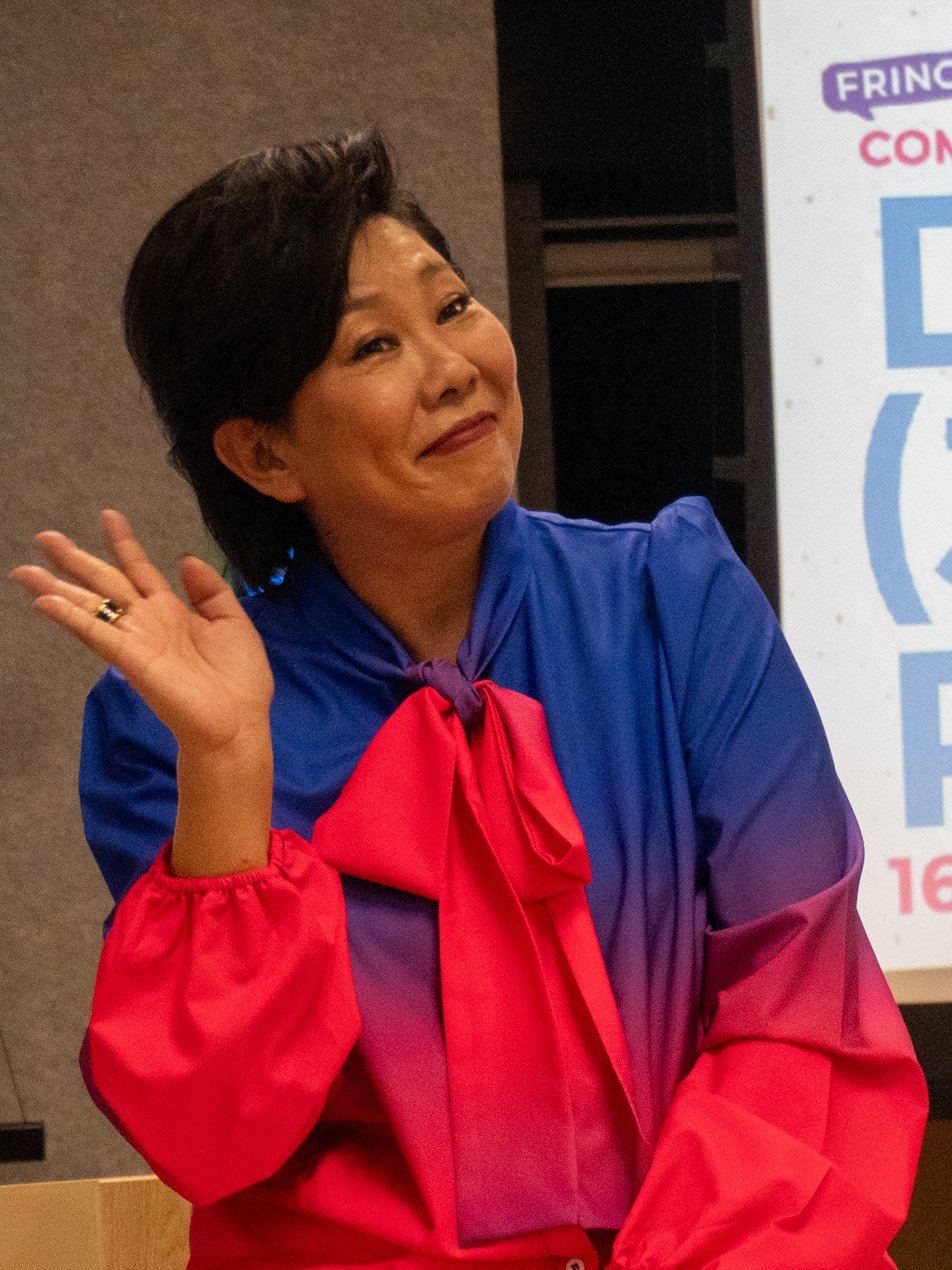
- Ang in September 2024
- Born: 1 September 1968 (age 58); Singapore
- Other name: Hong Ailing
- Education: CHIJ Kellock Primary School; Outram Secondary School; Outram Institute
- Occupations: Actress; comedian; entrepreneur; host; radio presenter; fencer
- Years active: 1989–present

Chinese name
- Traditional Chinese: 洪愛玲
- Simplified Chinese: 洪爱玲
- Hanyu Pinyin: Hóng Àilíng

Irene Ang PBM (born 1 September 1968) is a Singaporean actress, comedian, host and entrepreneur, best known for portraying Rosie Phua on the Singaporean sitcom Phua Chu Kang Pte Ltd, as well as on the Malaysian sequel sitcom Phua Chu Kang Sdn Bhd and the series' film adaptation Phua Chu Kang The Movie. She is also the founder and the CEO of Fly Entertainment, and additionally owns a maid agency, as well as a number of F&B and other entertainment-related companies.

== Early life ==
Irene Ang was born into a family of four, consisting of her parents, an elder brother and herself. When she was growing up, she was taken care mostly by her paternal grandmother, and other relatives as well, as her mother was a drug addict and her father a gambler.

Her mother, a former nightclub singer, became a drug addict due to marital issues. Her mother once took her, who's her father's favoured child, to a girls' home with the intent of leaving her there, to spite her father over his philandering ways. The staff at the home dissuaded her mother from following through as Ang was protesting loudly against the action. After her mother was in and out of the prison system over her drug use for a decade, Ang and her brother managed to convince her mother stay clean with an ultimatum that if she was again, they would leave her in 1983. After released from the prison in 1984, her mother has kept herself clean since.

== Education ==
Irene Ang first studied in CHIJ Kellock Primary School, and then Outram Secondary School, choosing it only because it had a swimming pool. In secondary school, she was on the water polo team and was a trained lifeguard by then. She then went onto Outram Institute to study for Singapore-Cambridge GCE Advanced Level education certificate. However, she did not take the exams as she could not afford the examination fees. She subsequently took the exams thrice, but failed.

== Career ==
=== Early career: Stunt performer, sales, and sports ===
In 1989, after attending Outram Institute, she and her friends responded to an ad recruiting stunt swimmers for a television series. She eventually became the stunt swimmer for Chen Liping in Splash to Victory. She later was a stunt double for Zoe Tay in the 1990 television series, Navy.

After leaving school, Irene Ang was a receptionist and clothing store sales supervisor. Ang then a sales executive with American Express for a year. It was also here when she started training in fencing. She trained for eight months before presenting Singapore the 1991 SEA Games and won a silver medal. After winning the SEA Games medal, she was shortlisted for representation at the following year's 1992 Summer Olympics. However she declined the offer as she could not afford the expenses to travel to Spain.

Ang was then hired at Bloomdale, which specialised in floral arrangements and corporate gifts, and led a sales team there. Her team would outperform the rest in the company. She would eventually be head-hunted and joined the insurance industry for seven years. When her grandmother was hospitalised, Ang was saddled with a S$26,000 credit card debt. Her supervisor at AIA, David Ong, would paid off the debt for her as a loan. In return, Ang would then worked hard for the next three months, bringing in enough policies to make it to the Million Dollar Club.

=== Forays in the entertainment industry ===
She would also work as a warm-up comedian to warm up the studio audience on the set of Under One Roof. It was here she was spotted by Phua Chua Kang Pte Ltd's producers and was asked to audition for roles in the upcoming television series.

In 1997, Ang was cast in Phua Chua Kang Pte Ltd as Rosie Phua, the wife of lead character Phua Chu Kang, a general contractor. As the 10-year long television series eventually became a regional hit, she would reprise her character in a Malaysian spin-off, and a movie, all of which revolving around Phua Chu Kang. In the first season, Ang was paid S$975.00 a month.

In 2022, Ang launched the web application TADAA! Casting which serves as a local and regional casting platform for entertainers.

In 2023, Ang was named as one of the recipients of the Public Service Medal (PBM), for her work as a committee member of the SkillsFuture programme with the South West Community Development Council.

In 2025, Ang launched The Irene Ang Show, a talk show featuring candid conversations with both celebrities and non-celebrity guests, including individuals from her personal and professional circles. The programme adopts an informal, conversational format that explores personal experiences, career journeys and behind-the-scenes aspects of the entertainment industry. One episode featuring actress Jeanette Aw attracted media attention after Aw recounted an incident in which she told a co-star to “do his homework” and learn his lines before coming onto set.

== Philanthropy ==
Drawing on her childhood experiences, she would lend her influence and voice behind projects such as the Fairy Godparent programme, an initiative by The Yellow Ribbon Fund and Industrial and Services Co-Operative Society (ISCOS) that would help children of ex-offenders acquire a good education and positive life skills.

== Personal life ==
In 1984, her parents would also file for a divorce. In 1996 her grandmother died, leaving behind a wish that Ang would take care of her parents. Irene Ang had since reconciled with her parents after finding faith through her religion, Christianity. Both her parents would then work for Irene in their later years, her mother a chef in one of Ang's restaurants; her father a driver in Fly Entertainment.

== Filmography ==
Ang has appeared in and/or produced the following programmes and films:

=== Film ===
Year	Title	Role	Notes	Ref.
2000	Stories About Love		Cameo	
2000	A Body Puzzle	Raymond's Mother	Cameo	
2000	Coming Home		Cameo	
2001	A Sharp Pencil		Cameo	
2010	Phua Chu Kang The Movie	Rosie Phua Chin Huay		
2011	Perfect Rivals	Mei Mei	Producer	
2011	Already Famous	Herself		
2012	Greedy Ghost			
2012	Ah Boys to Men	Mary Chow		
2013	Ah Boys to Men 2	Mary Chow		
2013	Love ... and Other Bad Habits	Mrs Cheng Cheng		
2014	Bullets Over Petaling Street	Jun Po		
2014	Filial Party	Felicia Chin (Yoona's Mother)		
2015	Ah Boys to Men 3: Frogmen	Mary Chow		
2015	Time is Money			
2016	My Love Sinema		Producer	

=== Television ===
Year	Title	Role	Notes	Ref.
1989	Splash to Victory	Ke Shasha		
1990	Navy			
1991	Pretty Faces			
1997	Growing Up	P.E. teacher		
1997–2007	Phua Chu Kang Pte Ltd	Rosie Phua Chin Huay		
2003	Lobang King	Mabel		
2008	Cosmo & George	Glorious Leader		
2009–2010	Phua Chu Kang Sdn Bhd	Rosie Phua Chin Huay		
2013	Who Is Max?		Producer	
2014–2015	Spouse for House	Tan Soo Leng (Kitty)		
2015	Lion Mums			
2016	The Hush			
2018	VIC	Victoria Lek / Vicky Zhan		
2018	In my Backyard			
2019	I'm Madam	Ivy		
2020	In Your Living Room			
2020	Happy-Go-Lucky			
2021	Kin	Song Danling		
2024	To Be Loved	Yao Huiqing		

=== Web series ===
Year	Title	Role	Notes	Ref.
2018	SG Kakis			
2020	Tiles War			
2022	I'm Actor Ah De			
2022	Downstairs Season 3		Animation - Voice	

== Theatre ==
- Ah Kong’s Birthday Party (1998)
- PIE (1999)
- 1+1=3 (2003)
- Mardi Gras (2003)
- Phua Chu Kang - The Musical (2005)
- Beauty World (2008)
- Stand Up for Singapore (2008)

== Awards and nominations ==
Year	Award	Category	Nominated work	Result	Ref
2002	Asian Television Awards	Best Comedy Performance by an Actress	Phua Chu Kang Pte Ltd	Won	
2014	Asian Television Awards	Best Comedy Performance by an Actress	Spouse For House	Won	
2024	Star Awards	Top 10 Most Popular Female Artistes	—N/a	Nominated	
2025	Star Awards	Top 10 Most Popular Female Artistes	—N/a	Nominated	
