= Phua Chu Kang The Movie =

2010 Malaysian-Singaporean comedy film

- Theatrical release poster
- Directed by: Boris Boo
- Screenplay by: Ong Su Mann; Eng Boon Ping; Tay Kong Hui
- Story by: Ong Su Mann
- Produced by: Au Yuk Sing
- Starring: Gurmit Singh; Irene Ang; Henry Thia; Neo Swee Lin; Lim Kay Siu
- Cinematography: C.L. Yong
- Edited by: Mak Chee Choong
- Music by: Martyn Gillman
- Production companies: mm2 Entertainment; Grand Brilliance
- Distributed by: Golden Village
- Release dates: 12 August 2010 (Singapore); 26 August 2010 (Malaysia)
- Running time: 98 minutes
- Countries: Singapore; Malaysia
- Languages: English; Chinese
- Budget: S$1 million
- Box office: S$691,300

Phua Chu Kang The Movie is a Singaporean-Malaysian comedy film and sequel to sitcoms Phua Chu Kang Pte Ltd and Phua Chu Kang Sdn Bhd. The film was released in Singapore on 12 August 2010 and Malaysia on 26 August 2010.

== Plot ==
Following the events of Phua Chu Kang Pte Ltd and Phua Chu Kang Sdn Bhd, Phua Ah Ma pays a visit to her eldest son and daughter-in-law being white-collar worker and general contractor Phua Chu Kang and his secretary wife Rosie Phua Chin Huay, who are currently based in Malaysia. Almost as soon as she arrives, she disappears, only to resurface mysteriously tending to an elderly man at a nursing home run by Lim Lau Pek, a crime boss and drug lord with his own gang who disguised himself as the owner of the nursing home, where the residents have been dying one by one, including an old man named Zaihan, one of the elderly man's good friend. Mistakenly, Lim believes Chu Kang is there to bid for a renovation job. Chu Kang agrees to the job only after Ah Ma calls in his nemesis, Frankie Foo, to bid for the job together with him, both in the hope of being awarded a lucrative job in the future. While Chu Kang is busy with construction, he misses his anniversary dinner with Rosie, who is wined and dined by Lim instead. At his luxurious mansion, Lim reveals that he has been siphoning the majority of funds from phone-in donations to the nursing home for his personal use. Shocked and guilty, Rosie attempts to convince Chu Kang to stop work to no avail. Meanwhile, Ah Ma reveals that the elderly man she has been looking after is Chu Kang's grandfather, Ah Kong, who abandoned Chu Kang in the belief that he would bring the family bad luck. Rosie joins forces with Ah Kong and Frankie, who has a crush on her, to find Lim's laptop in order to bring him to justice. The trio are caught in action by Lim and his 3 gangsters, who in turn are apprehended by the police that Chu Kang, who pretended to continue to work for Lim, called in. Chu Kang is reunited with Ah Kong, only to have Lim escape the clutches of the police before being caught by King Kong, who has returned from a date with the nursing home worker Angel. Chu Kang's reunion with Ah Kong is cut short when Ah Kong passes away, after accepting Chu Kang back to the family.

== Cast ==
- Gurmit Singh – Phua Chu Kang, Ah Pa (Phua Chu Kang's father, Prince) and Ah Kong (Phua Chu Kang's grandfather, Ah Pa's father, King)
- Irene Ang – Rosie Phua Chin Huay
- Henry Thia – Lim Lau Pek and Lim Lau Hea
- Neo Swee Lin – Phua Ah Ma (Princess)
- Lim Kay Siu – Frankie Foo
- Charlie Tan – King Kong
- Angie Seow – Angel
- Leong Soh Chuo
- Arrif Effendy din Muaharan
- Dato Abd Aziz B.Imam Salleh
- Wong Yat Hong
- Lee Zu Thong

== Production ==
As early as 2000, the idea of a Phua Chu Kang movie had already been floated. However, Gurmit Singh and team felt that they had to wait for a script that combined Phua's trademark Singlish and physical humour with heartfelt drama and added new characters so that audiences would be willing to pay for it.

For his double role as Ah Kong, Gurmit Singh had to spend two hours in make-up.

This was actress Angie Seow's debut movie role.

The movie was mostly filmed at Sri Seronok Retirement Village in Cheras, Kuala Lumpur, Malaysia.

Scriptwriter Ong Su Mann refused to watch the movie after being "dismayed" by the number of lines in its two-minute trailer that he didn't write. Instead of attending the premiere, he sent his mother and sister, who slept through most of it.

== Critical reception ==
Critical reception of Phua Chu Kang The Movie was overwhelmingly negative.

Phin Wong of TODAY found that the adaptation from small to big screen "ends up looking less like a film and more like a series of skits built around a barely-there story, with a handful of inexplicable melodrama thrown in", also calling it "an unfortunate waste of a talented cast playing well-loved characters capable of so much more."

Dylan Tan of The Business Times criticised its "scattershot plot", "annoying catchphrases shamelessly recycled", "banal gags", "exaggerated acting", "below-average production values" and "shoddy cinematography". He added, "To say PCK The Movie is a half-baked and rough effort could well be the understatement of the year as it’s neither original, clever nor grand enough to warrant a big-screen outing", claiming the film was made for the Malaysian market.

In contrast, Han Wei Chou of Channel NewsAsia found it "peppered with hilarious situations, side-splitting antics and well-delivered jokes that reflect the cast's comedic talents". He praised the film's director and screenwriter for managing to "translate the spirit of the television series onto the film medium quite well".

Stefan Shih of MovieXclusive.com awarded the film 1.5/4, criticising its "Jack Neo-ish style" and "many blatant product placement[s]". He gave the "scriptwriters credit in getting creative with the setting", which allowed the film to focus on Phua and Rosie, but concluded that it is "only suitable for kids as it played out in juvenile fashion appealing only to that targeted demographic".

Lai Swee Wei of Cinema Online gave the film 2.5/5. Lai praised it for providing "good reminiscence of the TV series" and its catch phrases, but criticised the "weak wordplay and slapstick which seemed aimed at younger audiences", the "lengthy storyline" with "unnecessary supporting character subplots" and the unmemorable ending.

== Achievements ==
Gurmit Singh and Irene Ang were nominated for Best Actor and Best Actress respectively at the 1st Golden Wau Awards, aimed at promoting Chinese-language Malaysian films, for their roles in this movie. Gurmit lost to Jack Neo in Homecoming (2011) while Ang lost to Angelica Lee in Ice Kacang Puppy Love (2010).
