= Splash to Victory =

- 绿水英姿
- Genre: Swimming
- Starring: Chen Liping; Madeline Chu; Hu Shuxian; Li Nanxing
- Country of origin: Singapore
- Original language: Mandarin
- No. of seasons: 1
- No. of episodes: 21

Production
- Producer: Michael Woo

Original release
- Network: SBC Channel 8
- Release: August 21 – October 6, 1989

Splash to Victory (Chinese: 绿水英姿) is a Singaporean Chinese-language drama series. The series stars Chen Liping, Madeline Chu, Hu Shuxian and Li Nanxing.

== Cast ==
- Chen Liping as Liang Qiaohua
- Madeline Chu as Liang Panpan
- Hu Shuxian as Zhou Ruonan
- Li Nanxing as Li Jiajun
- Chen Huihui as Susanna
- Tiow Im Tan as Ma Tianxiong
- Zheng Geping as Jiang Zi'an
- Huang Chengyi as Zhang Yanni
- Ye Shipin as Liang Chaoming
- Huang Shaoting as Qin Shufen
- Wang Songshen as Wu Xuegui
- Ang Teck Bee
- Pan En as Zhou Weiqiang
- Zeng Sipei as Xian Yumei
- He Qitang as Zhou Ruolong
- Lan Qinran
- Lin Qingen
- Zhang Susi
- Zhou Yunfeng
- Chen Qiaomei
- Zhong Baoping
- Irene Ang as Ke Shasha
- He Huijing
- Wu Yimei
- Khoon Siew Kin
- Michelle Chia as Zhu Xiaofang
- Wang Changli as Director Wang
- Chua Cheng Pou
- Tang Wentao
- Ang Peng Siong
- Lin Jinchi
- Wu Weiqiang
- Beatrice Chien
- Chen Hanwei as Peter
- Hu Shufen
- An Zheming
