= 12 Storeys =

1997 Singaporean drama film

- French film poster
- Directed by: Eric Khoo
- Written by: Eric Khoo; James Toh
- Produced by: Brian Hong
- Starring: Jack Neo
- Cinematography: Yoke Weng Ho
- Edited by: Jasmine Ng Kin Kia
- Music by: Kevin Mathews
- Release date: 12 June 1997
- Running time: 105 minutes
- Country: Singapore
- Languages: English; Mandarin

12 Storeys (十二樓 or Shí'èr lóu in Mandarin) is a 1997 Singaporean drama film written and directed by Eric Khoo. It features an ensemble cast of Jack Neo, Koh Boon Pin and Quan Yi Fong. It was screened in the Un Certain Regard section at the 1997 Cannes Film Festival.

== Plot ==
The film follows a day in the lives of several households living within the same HDB block.

A soup vendor called Ah Gu is having a hard time dealing with his Mainland Chinese wife, Lily. San San, an overweight loner, is haunted by her feelings of isolation and the memory of her deceased mother. Meng, Trixie and Tee are siblings left to their own devices when their parents go on holiday.

== Cast ==
- Jack Neo as Ah Gu
- Koh Boon Pin as Meng
- Quan Yi Fong (credited as Chuang Yi Fong) as Lily
- Lum May Yee as Trixie
- Lucilla Teoh as San San
- Ritz Lim as Spirit
- Roderick Lim as Tee
- Ronald Toh Chee Kong as Eddy
- Loy Lok Yee as Mother
- Tan Kheng Hua as Spirit's Mother
- Neo Swee Lin as Rachel
- Lim Kay Siu as Hawker
- Lim Kay Tong as Mark

== Reception ==
Derek Elley of Variety wrote that the film's has "genuinely funny" moments, but its slow pacing "blunts the humor". Time Out called it "witty and sophisticated stuff".

Singapore's Ministry of Foreign Affairs said that it "is widely regarded to have contributed to the revitalisation of local cinema".
