= Ong Su Mann =

Singaporean writer

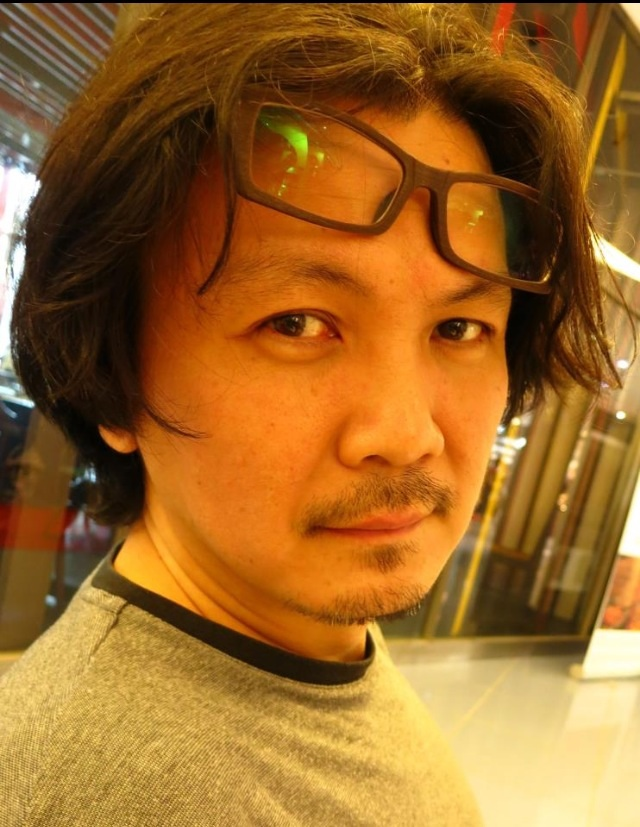
In 2011

Ong Su Mann is a writer, producer, and columnist based in Singapore, often writing as S. M. Ong. He is best known as a producer and writer for the popular comedy show Phua Chu Kang Pte Ltd (1997–2007), and he was the writer of Phua Chu Kang The Movie (2010). He was also a columnist for The New Paper of Singapore, writing the column "Act Blur". He wrote and directed the "Daddy's Girls" episode that won the Asian Television Award for Best Comedy in 2005.
