= Lim Kay Siu =

Singaporean actor (born 1960)

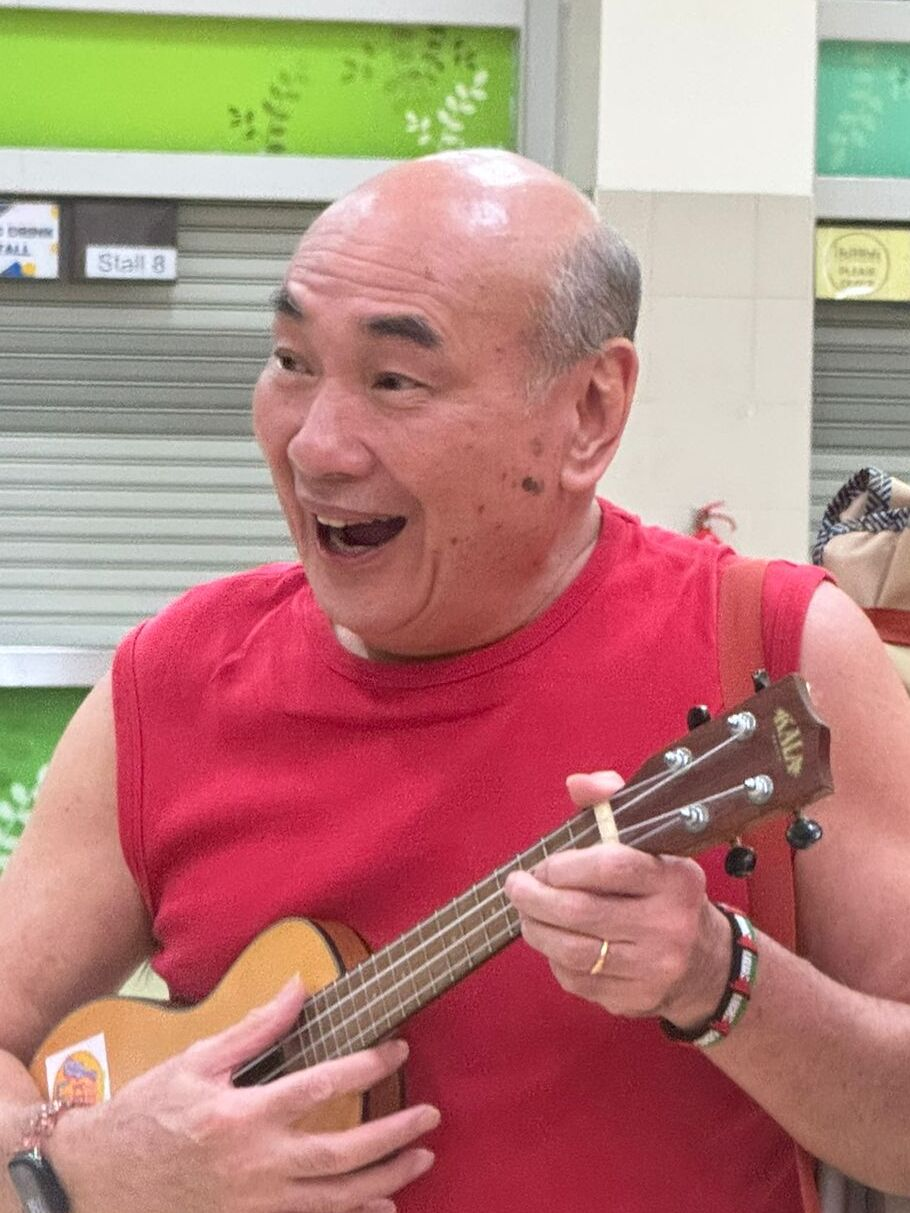
- Lim in 2025
- Born: 28 February 1956 (age 70); Colony of Singapore
- Years active: 1985−present
- Spouse: Neo Swee Lin (m. 1992)
- Relatives: Sylvia Tan (sister-in-law)
- Family: Irene Lim Kay Han (sister); Lim Kay Tong (brother)
- Musical career
- Instruments: Vocals; ukulele
- Member of: TheNeoKELELims

Chinese name
- Traditional Chinese: 林繼修
- Simplified Chinese: 林继修
- Hanyu Pinyin: Lín Jìxiū
- Hokkien POJ: Lîm Kè-siu

Lim Kay Siu (born 28 February 1956) is a Singaporean character actor who has appeared in several Asian films, television series, and theatrical productions since the 1980s.

== Career ==
In the Western world, Lim is known for his role as Monk Gyatso, in Avatar - The Last Airbender. He is also known for playing the North Korean villain in Night Watch. The film is set in Hong Kong where he starred alongside Pierce Brosnan and Alexandra Paul. He also stars as Prince Chowfa, King Mongkut's brother (Chow Yun-fat), in Anna and the King.

He appeared in various episodes of the Singapore sitcom Phua Chu Kang Pte Ltd as the title character's main rival, Frankie Foo, between 1997 and 2006.

== Personal life ==
His older brother, Lim Kay Tong, is also an actor and well-known television personality in Singapore.

Lim first met his wife, Neo Swee Lin, on her debut theatre performance, Dragon's Teeth Gate, in 1986. The two would act as a married couple four years later on the play, The Moon is Less Bright. They married on 12 August 1992. In September 2026, they were both charged with taking part in a public assembly.

Lim and his wife Neo streams regularly on Twitch under the username TheNeoKELELims.

== Filmography ==
- Singapore Sling (1993) (TV) .... Sammy
- Night Watch (1995) (TV) (as Lim Kay Siu) .... Mao Yixin
- Happy Belly (1996) .... Chef Wong San Hoi
- 12 Storeys (1997) .... Hawker
- Phua Chu Kang Pte Ltd (1997-2007) .... Frankie Foo
- Forever Fever (1998) .... Father
- Where Got Problem? (1999) .... Lee Kay Seng
- Rogue Trader (1999) (as Lim Kay Siu) .... Police officer
- Anna and the King (1999) .... Prince Chowfa, King Mongkut's Brother
- Avatar (2004) .... Julius
- POV Murder (2005) TV Series .... Mystery Man
- Random Acts (2007) TV Series .... Various Roles
- Just Follow Law (2007) ....... Ground Transport Authority (GTA) Represensative
- Kallang Roar the Movie (2008) .... Choo Seng Quee
- The Blue Mansion (2009) .... Wee Teck Liang
- Phua Chu Kang The Movie (2010) .... Frankie Foo
- Lord of the Flies (2016) (Stage)
- Avatar: The Last Airbender (2024) .... Monk Gyatso

== Selected theatrical works ==
- Dragon's Teeth Gate (1986)
- The Moon is Less Bright (1990)
- Tender Submission (2023)
