= Phua Chu Kang Pte Ltd =

Singaporean sitcom (1997–2007)

- Genre: Sitcom
- Created by: Andrea Teo
- Written by: Lillian Wang; Tan Wei-Lyn; Ong Su Mann; Soo Sien Theng; Alex Soh; Esan Sivalingam; Sunita Sivalingam; Simon Tan; Muhammed Mahfuz; Sam Lee; Joanne Teo; Soh Seng Leng; Imran Johri; Sunita Hanson; Tamil Selven; Jane Poh; Stella Wee; Stephen Yan; Clare Chin; Lynette Chiu; Charles C. Kim
- Directed by: Andrea Teo; Colin Cairnes; Eunice Tan; Jennifer Tan; Daisy Irani; Seah Wee Thye; Gloria Chee; Sandy Phillips; Serene d'Cotta; Pepper See; Kelvin Ha; Ian Seymour
- Starring: Gurmit Singh; Irene Ang; Pierre Png; Edwin Chong; Tan Kheng Hua; Marcus Ng Yi Loong; Neo Swee Lin; Charlie Tan; Ray Kuan; Lim Kay Siu
- Theme music composer: Nicholas Lim
- Country of origin: Singapore
- Original language: English
- No. of seasons: 8
- No. of episodes: 166 (list of episodes)

Production
- Executive producer: Colin Cairnes
- Producer: Ong Su Mann
- Running time: 22–23 minutes; 68 minutes (finale)
- Production company: Mediacorp Studios

Original release
- Network: MediaCorp Channel 5
- Release: 25 September 1997 – 11 February 2007

Phua Chu Kang Pte Ltd is a Singaporean sitcom that originally aired on Mediacorp Channel 5 from 25 September 1997 to 11 February 2007, starring Gurmit Singh as Phua Chu Kang, an eccentric general contractor who wears yellow boots and is portrayed as an Ah Beng, and his family, portrayed by Irene Ang, Pierre Png, Tan Kheng Hua, Marcus Ng Yi Loong, and Neo Swee Lin. Charlie Tan and Ray Kuan portray Phua's blue-collared worker laborers, whilst Lim Kay Siu portrays Phua's rival general contractor, Frankie Foo. The series was created by Andrea Teo, written and produced by Ong Su Mann and Mediacorp Studios, and ran for eight seasons and 166 episodes.

It was Singapore's second English sitcom after Under One Roof and one of the most popular locally produced English television series in Singapore alongside Under One Roof and Growing Up. The series earned Best Comedy Programme at the Asian Television Awards between 1998 and 2003, while Singh won the Best Comedy Performance by an Actor thrice for his role.

The sitcom also spawned a musical Phua Chu Kang The Musical, a Malaysian sequel, Phua Chu Kang Sdn Bhd and a movie adaptation, Phua Chu Kang The Movie, featuring its characters.

== Plot ==
=== Phua Chu Kang ===
Phua Chu Kang
- First appearance: Season 1; Episode 1
- Last appearance: Season 8; Episode 14
- Created by: Andrea Teo; Kenneth Liang
- Portrayed by: Gurmit Singh

In-universe information
- Nickname: Kang Kang
- Gender: Male
- Occupation: CEO and General Contractor of PCK Pte Ltd
- Family: Anthony Phua Chu Beng (younger brother), Phua Ah Ma (mother), Phua Ah Pa (father, deceased), Phua Ah Kong (grandfather, deceased, which he was later featured and appeared in Phua Chu Kang The Movie)
- Spouse: Rosie Phua Chin Huay (wife)
- Children: Romeo Ferrari Phua (son), Crystal Jade Phua (daughter)
- Relatives: Margaret Phua Hwee Lian (sister-in-law), Aloysius Phua (nephew)

The series revolves around the Phua family, most notably Phua Chu Kang, a general contractor who boasts that he is the "Best in Singapore, JB, and some say Batam" - this is despite the fact that he has only two men working for him (names are King Kong and Ah Boon/Soon/Goon depending on which season) and they are both inept and lazy. He is also noted for his famous cliché or catchphrase: "Don't play play" (pronounced as "pray pray" according to his articulation). There is also another famous catchphrase, which is known as, "Use your brain!" (pronounced as "blain"). His personal clothing trademarks are his yellow pair of boots (bought in Beach Road), curly hair, a giant black mole, and long nails on his pinky fingers. Phua Chu Kang is portrayed as an "Ah Beng", which is a Singlish slang for a stereotypical, uneducated Chinese gangster, complete with habits such as hoisting one leg up on the seat of a chair when he sits down and growing one long fingernail to scratch his ears.

=== His family and relations ===
Phua Chu Kang lives with his wife Rosie Phua Chin Huay (Irene Ang), his younger brother Anthony Phua Chu Beng (Edwin Chong in Season 1 and Pierre Png from Seasons 2-8), his younger sister-in-law Margaret Phua Hwee Lian (Tan Kheng Hua), his nephew Aloysius Phua (Marcus Ng Yi Loong) and also most importantly his mother Phua Ah Ma (Neo Swee Lin) at a semi detached house located at Unit 141, Namly Avenue, Namly Garden, Sixth Avenue, Bukit Timah Road. Even his construction company and office being PCK Pte Ltd is also located at the backyard of his bungalow house either, in which he hired 2 workers who are the fat King Kong (Charlie Tan) who loves "tau huay" (a Chinese bean curd dessert) and the attractive yet slow-witted Ah Goon (Ray Kuan) who dresses in revealing denim cut-offs all the time. During the 1st season, instead of Ah Goon, Ah Boon (Alwin Low) works with King Kong but was forced to leave after he had to work in Brunei. Ah Soon (Don Yap) replaced Ah Boon in the 2nd season, however Ah Soon was needed to do his National Service, hence Ah Goon took over Ah Soon by the 3rd season.

== Cast ==
Season eight cast of Phua Chu Kang Pte Ltd. (L–R) Phua Chu Kang, Rosie Phua, Phua Chu Beng, Margaret Phua, Aloysius Phua, Ah Goon, and King Kong. Phua Ah Ma and Frankie Foo are not pictured.

- Gurmit Singh as Phua Chu Kang, the general contractor, white-collar worker and CEO of PCK Pte Ltd.
- Irene Ang as Rosie Phua Chin Huay, Chu Kang's wife who works as his secretary at PCK Pte Ltd and enjoys playing mahjong, buying clothes, doing facial and going for slimwrap.
- Pierre Png (Seasons 2-8) as Anthony Phua Chu Beng, Chu Kang's younger brother who works for him as an architect at PCK Pte Ltd. He is the pliable and soft speaking compliant son of the family.
  - Edwin Chong (Season 1)
- Tan Kheng Hua as Margaret Phua Hwee Lian, the wife of Chu Beng, who is the President of the Vegetarian Society of Singapore and consistently makes fun of Chu Kang and Rosie.
- Marcus Ng Yi Loong as Aloysius Phua, the son of Chu Beng and Margaret.
- Neo Swee Lin as Phua Ah Ma, the mother of Chu Kang and Chu Beng.
- Charlie Tan as King Kong, one of Chu Kang's two lazy laborers at PCK Pte Ltd who is fat and loves "tau huay" (a Chinese bean curd dessert).
- Ray Kuan as Ah Goon, one of Chu Kang's 2 lazy laborers at PCK Pte Ltd who is an attractive yet slow-witted who dresses in revealing denim cut-offs all the time.
- Lim Kay Siu as Frankie Foo, a general contractor and Chu Kang's former best friend in primary school and currently archenemies and business rivals.
- Afdlin Shauki as Bobo, an electrician and new employee hired by Chu Kang working at PCK Pte Ltd.
- Wendy Ng as Ah Loon, Rosie's overbearing mother, Chu Kang's mother-in-law, Heng Pek's wife and Phua Ah Ma's affinal.
- Henry Thia as Heng Pek, Rosie's father, Chu Kang's father-in-law and Ah Loon's husband.

== Episodes ==
Series	Episodes	Originally released	
Series	Episodes	First released	Last released
1	20	25 September 1997	5 February 1998
2	28	3 March 1999	8 September 1999
3	26	18 April 2000	10 October 2000
4	25	10 July 2001	25 December 2001
5	22	5 November 2002	15 April 2003
6	15	21 October 2003	27 January 2004
7	16	16 November 2004	1 March 2005
8	14	31 October 2006	11 February 2007

== Production ==
=== Background and creation ===
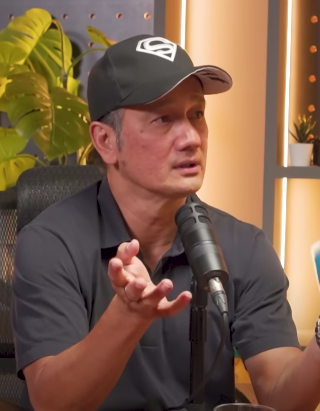
Gurmit Singh (pictured in 2024) portrayed Phua Chu Kang in both Gurmit's World and Phua Chu Kang Pte Ltd.

The character of Phua Chu Kang first appeared on the second season of television show Gurmit's World, where Gurmit Singh portrayed multiple characters in different skits. The idea of one of the characters being a general contractor was first suggested by Kenneth Liang, the then-head of English entertainment productions. Singh, alongside producers Edmund Tan, Chaya Bhatt, and Rose Sivam, created the character in 1995 for one of his skits. Phua Chu Kang is described as "an exaggeration of your typical Singaporean contractor." Gurmit's World only ran from May to December 1995, but the skit involving Phua Chu Kang proved to be the most popular.

Mediacorp wanted to create another sitcom after the success of their first locally produced English language sitcom Under One Roof. They decided to expand the Phua Chu Kang skit from Gurmit's World into its own full-fledged show, particularly due to its popularity and that there was growing interest in stories about contractors. For the television show, they expanded on Phua Chu Kang by creating a family for him. Andrea Teo, then-assistant vice president of Production 5, helped in developing the show and is credited as the creator of this sitcom.

=== Casting ===
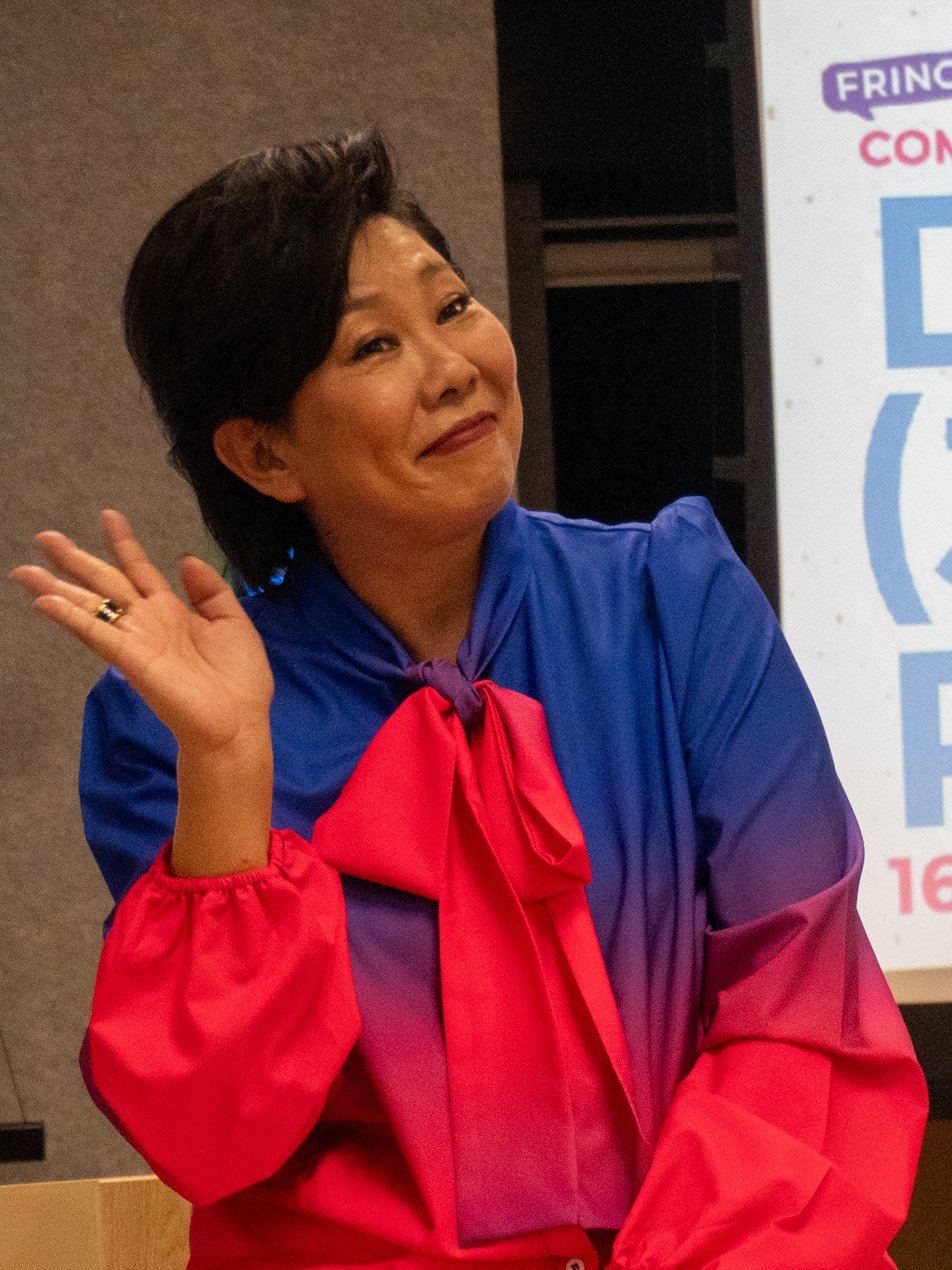
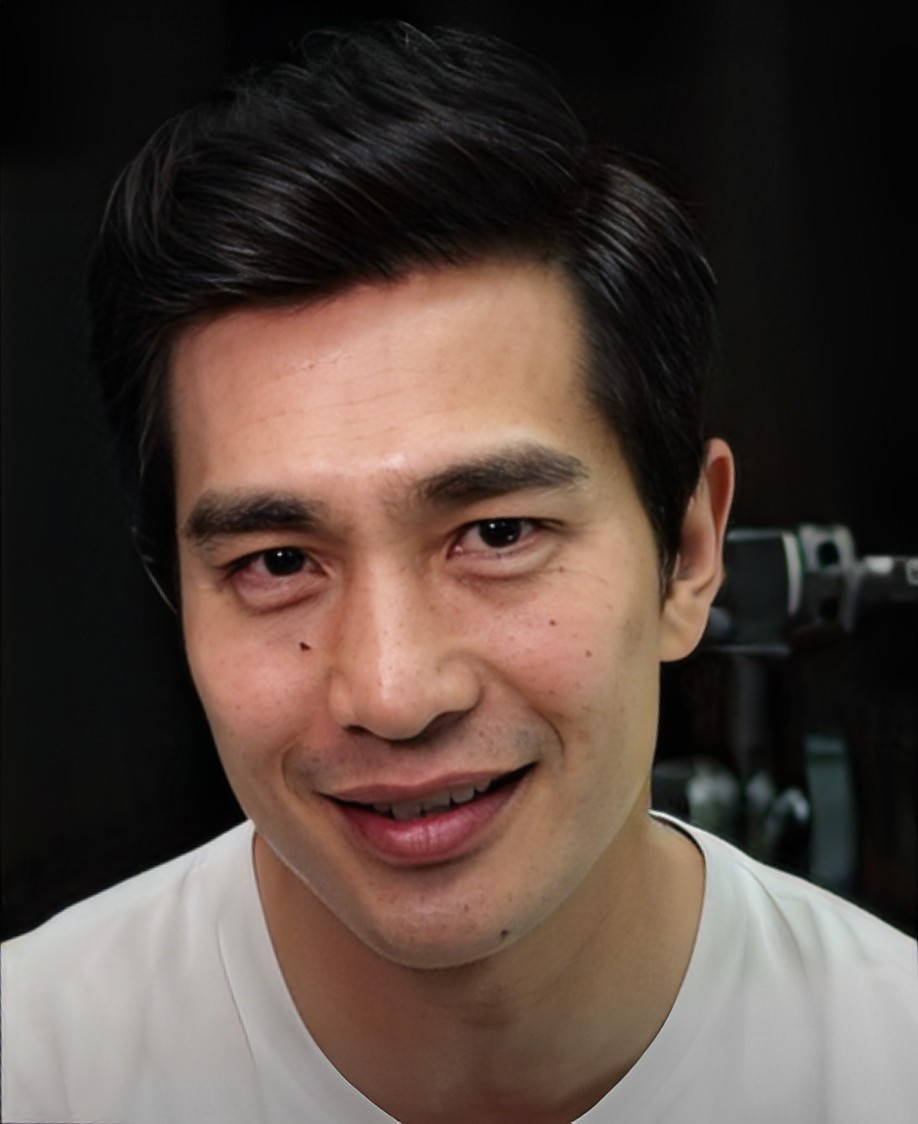
Irene Ang (top; pictured in 2024) and Pierre Png (bottom; pictured in 2017) play Rosie Phua and Phua Chu Beng respectively.

Singh continued to portray Phua Chu Kang for the television show. Rosie Phua Chin Huay, whom is Phua Chu Kang's wife who also appeared on Gurmit's World, was portrayed by Irene Ang in the show instead of Julie Sim-Chew, who worked on a production team with Mediacorp. Before Phua Chu Kang Pte Ltd, Ang worked as an insurance agent and warmed up crowds before Under One Roof. It was here that she was noticed by the production team and asked to audition for the role of Rosie Phua Chin Huay. Teo stated about Ang that she "is a bit of a tomboy" and that "I remember going down to the rehearsal and looking at her and saying: 'You've got to be way, way more sexy.'" Ang herself said "I only remember [Teo] trying to teach me how to be more feminine." To portray Rosie better, Ang wore a wig, long fingernails, makeup, and tights for the role.

The younger brother of Phua Chu Kang, Phua Chu Beng, was initially portrayed by Edwin Chong in the first season before he left and was replaced by Pierre Png, who portrayed the character for the rest of the series. According to Eunice Tan, an executive producer for Phua Chu Kang, Chong left to continue a career in accountancy. Following his win at the 1998 Fame Awards, Png was considered by Teo to be a good replacement for Chong. For the role, Png grew a moustache and goatee to appear older whilst also giving the character a more Singaporean accent, as compared to Chong's portrayal who gave Phua Chu Beng a more American accent. Phua Chu Beng's wife and sister-in-law to Phua Chu Kang, Margaret Phua, was portrayed by Tan Kheng Hua. Due to the fact that Margaret's character was a vegetarian, Tan ate exclusively vegetarian foods throughout the show, something which she later said she hated.

Neo Swee Lin portrayed the Phua brother's elderly mother, Phua Ah Ma. Neo typically acted in roles of older characters but said that Ah Ma was one of the oldest roles she had played; she was in her thirties when she appeared on Phua Chu Kang Pte Ltd. Marcus Ng Yi Loong portrayed Aloysius Phua, Phua Chu Beng and Margaret Phua's son. An established child actor before appearing on this show, both Ang and Png have joked that Ng was better at acting than them when they first joined Phua Chu Kang, this show having been their first major roles. Charlie Tan and Ray Kuan portray Phua Chu Kang's blue-collar workers named King Kong and Ah Goon, respectively. Tan was more reluctant in accepting the role as he would be portraying a "blue-collar, Ah Beng worker". Kuan got the role after he was "literally picked up off the street" by the casting director, who suggested he audition for the role. Lim Kay Siu portrays Phua Chu Kang's rival contractor, Frankie Foo.

== Singlish and reception ==
"Gurmit Singh can speak many languages, but Phua Chu Kang speaks only Singlish. If our children learn Singlish from Phua Chu Kang, they will not become as talented as Gurmit Singh."

— Goh Chok Tong, 1999 National Day Rally

This sitcom is notable for its characters' use of Singlish (an English-based creole with Malay, Chinese, Tamil and other influences) in everyday conversation. Due to its use of Singlish, a pidgin English spoken in Singapore, the show came under pressure by the Singaporean Government to use only "proper" English. This was mainly because of the worry that the younger school going viewers would start speaking Singlish more and bring down the standard of spoken English in Singapore. Another popular Singaporean sitcom that also received similar pressure was Under One Roof, which was also put under pressure by the Singapore Government to use formal English instead of intermittently incorporating colloquial Singlish.

Critics of the show labelled Phua Chu Kang as an inaccurate or perceived undesirable representation of Singapore, and denounced his appearance in The Amazing Race. However, Phua Chu Kang remains popular in Singapore and Malaysia.

In 1999, the second Prime Minister of Singapore, Goh Chok Tong, referenced Phua Chu Kang during the National Day Rally speech. In response, the sitcom's 3rd season opened with Phua Chu Kang earning a certificate for completing the "BEST English" course from Institute of Technical Education, and dialogue had to be adapted to limit the usage of Singlish.

Retrospectively, Singh and Pierre agreed that the usage of Singlish gave the show its own unique Singaporean identity.

=== Awards ===
Phua Chu Kang Pte Ltd won "Best Comedy Programme" at the Asian Television Awards for six consecutive years from 1998 to 2003. The cast also won "Best Comedy performance by an actress" for Neo Swee Lin (1999), Tan Kheng Hua (2001) and Irene Ang (2002) as well as "Best Comedy performance by an actor"- Gurmit Singh (1998-2001 & 2003).

== Other media ==
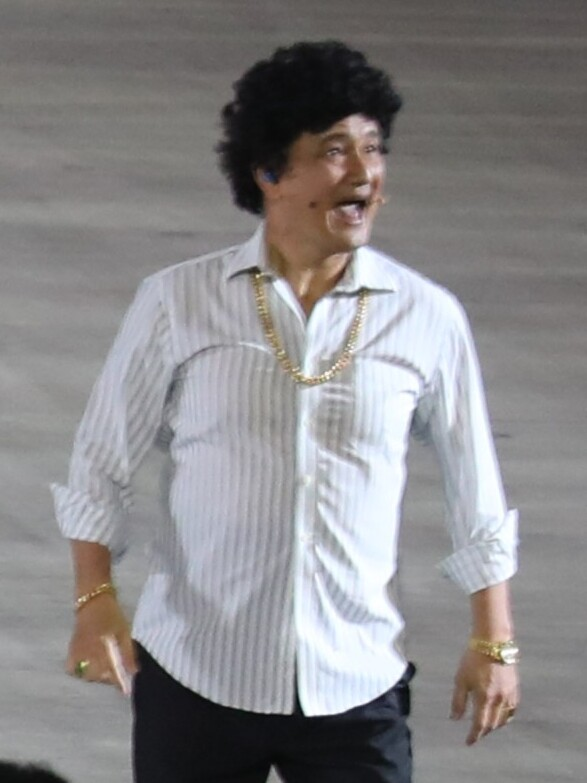
Singh in character as Phua Chu Kang at the 2026 National Day Parade

In The Amazing Race 3, Phua Chu Kang handed out clues at one of the detours. Participants in the race were required to locate a HDB apartment in Choa Chu Kang, Singapore where they would be given the clues by PCK. Apparently, the original idea was to have PCK at the pit stop alongside Phil Keoghan (at the end of every stage of The Amazing Race, there would be a local person dressed in traditional clothing welcoming the contestants to the country), but Singaporeans protested that this would give foreigners the wrong impression of the local people in general.

In 2003, during the SARS outbreak, PCK appeared in a music video called "PCK Sar-vivor Rap". This 4-minute-long music video is to teach the local people on how to prevent SARS in their country. It also comes with an audio version (with remix) of the song. In addition, a limited edition compilation album called "The Sar-vivor Rap" was launched on 1 July 2003. This album also includes 14 bonus tracks from artists such as Mandy Moore, Destiny's Child and Jessica Simpson. In 2020, PCK appeared in a series of music videos teaching Singaporeans about how to stay safe during the COVID-19 pandemic.

Phua Chu Kang also made guest appearances in one drama and three other local sitcoms: in the Mandarin drama The Hotel, in the sixth season of Under One Roof where he, King Kong and Ah Goon were called to do renovations for the house of Ah Teck and Dolly's son and daughter-in-law Paul and Anita, played by Andrew Lim and Selena Tan respectively, both in 2001, the Mandarin sitcom My Genie in 2002 together with Rosie, and ABC DJ in 2006 together with Rosie and Ah Goon.

Phua Chu Kang has also appeared on TV advertisements. He, along with his younger brother Anthony Phua Chu Beng, made their first advertisement appearance regarding the introduction of 3G mobile services and phones in Malaysia by Maxis. In 2003, PCK appeared in another commercial in Malaysia introducing plant-based administration for pain relief by Kinohimitsu that was aired on TV1, TV2 and TV3.

On 23 May 2009, Phua Chu Kang and Rosie Phua Chin Huay made their appearances on the Mass Rapid Transit (MRT), as part of a campaign by Singapore Kindness Movement and the public transport authorities. A music video titled "A Happy Journey Starts Like That", similar to "Love Your Ride" by Dim Sum Dollies, which was released 1 year later in 2010, which substitutes the security video that is currently shown at LCD displays on other MRT lines. The video reminds that commuters should be gracious and thus creating a happy journey for everyone.

In 2022, the cast reunited after 15 years on an episode on CNA's On the Red Dot series, titled "Phua Chu Kang Reunion: How's Singapore's Favourite Contractor?".

== International broadcast ==
In the Philippines, it was broadcast on TV5 on 24 August 2009 with Filipino-dubbed, and in Malaysia, it was broadcast on TV3 and NTV7 along with Under One Roof.

== See also ==
- Phua Chu Kang Sdn Bhd
- Phua Chu Kang The Movie
