= Neo Swee Lin =

Singaporean actress (born 1962 or 1963

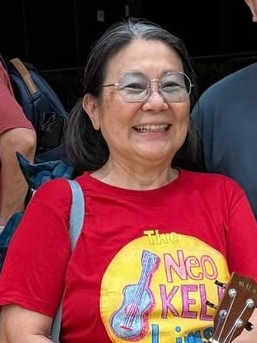
- Neo in 2025
- Born: Winifred Neo Swee Lin; 15 February 1963 (age 63) (Note: Neo was reported as being 35 years old in a Straits Times article dated 16 November 1998.); Colony of Singapore
- Education: CHIJ Katong Convent
- Alma mater: National University of Singapore; Royal Scottish Academy of Music and Drama
- Occupations: Actress; singer
- Years active: 1986–present
- Height: 1.52 m (5 ft 0 in)
- Spouse: Lim Kay Siu (m. 1992)
- Musical career
- Instruments: Vocals; ukulele
- Member of: TheNeoKELELims

Chinese name
- Chinese: 梁瑞玲
- Hanyu Pinyin: Liáng Ruìlíng

Winifred Neo Swee Lin (born 15 February 1963) is a Singaporean actress who has appeared in several Asian media productions and theatrical works since the 1980s.

== Early life ==
Born in Singapore, Neo Swee Lin has a law degree from National University of Singapore and trained at the Royal Scottish Academy of Music and Drama.

== Career ==
Neo's international film and theatre work includes: Takeaway, The Letter (Lyric Hammersmith), Mail Order Bride (West Yorkshire Playhouse), 3 Japanese Women (Cockpit Theatre) and Trishaw.

== Personal life ==
Neo first met her husband, Lim Kay Siu, a veteran theatre actor, on her first theatre play, Dragon's Teeth Gate, in 1986. The two would act as a married couple four years later on the play, The Moon is Less Bright. They married on 12 August 1992.

In 2026, they were both charged with taking part in a public assembly.

The two streams regularly in Twitch together under the username TheNeoKELELims.

== Filmography ==
=== Film and television ===
Year	Title	Role	Notes	Ref
1997	12 Storeys	Rachel		
1998	The Teenage Textbook Movie			
1999	Anna and the King	Lady Jao Jom Manda Ung		
2007	Katong Fugue		Short film	
2007	Just Follow Law	NRT Representative		
2008	Kallang Roar the Movie			
2009	The Blue Mansion	Wee Pei Shan		
2010	Phua Chu Kang The Movie	Phua Ah Ma		
2015	My Autograph Book	Su Min	Short film	
2018	You Mean the World to Me	Cheng		
2019	Repossession	Sister Agnes		
2023	Tomorrow Is a Long Time	Wan		

Her other works included: Where Got Problem? (1999), Random Acts, Really Something, Phua Chu Kang Pte Ltd (1997–2007), Drive: Life and Death, The Celebration and Cut and My Grandson, the Doctor (1996-1997).

== Theatre ==
Neo has appeared in more than 40 plays which included:

- Dragon's Teeth Gate (1986)
- Three Children (1987)
- Three Children (1988)
- M. Butterfly (1989)
- The Moon is Less Bright (1990)
- Three Children (1992)
- Drunken Prawns (1994)
- The Glass Menagerie (1996)
- Beauty World – President Star Charity (1998)
- Ah Kong's Birthday Party (1998)
- Emily of Emerald Hill (1999)
- Emily of Emerald Hill (2000)
- Emily of Emerald Hill (2002)
- Hamlet (2002)
- For the Pleasure of Seeing Her Again (2004)
- 2nd Link (2006)
- Homesick (2006)
- Cogito (2007)
- Postcards from Rosa (2007)
- Crazy Christmas (2007)
- Crazy Christmas (2008)
- Nadirah (2009)
- Poop (2009)
- Cinderel-lah! (2010)
- Crazy Christmas (2010)
- Emily of Emerald Hill (2011)
- Nadirah (2011)
- Crazy Christmas (2011)
- Cooling Off Day (2011)
- Cooling Off Day (2012)
- First Light (2012)
- Crazy Christmas (2012)
- Mama Looking for her Cat (2012)
- The Crucible (2013)
- Crazy Christmas (2013)
- Postcards from Rosa (2013)
- The House of Bernada Alba (2014)
- Hamlet (2014)
- First Light (2014)
- Crazy Christmas (2015)
- Hamlet (2016)
- Crazy Christmas (2016)
- Romeo & Juliet (2016)
- My Mother's Chest (2016)
- Medea (2017)
- No Parking on Odd Days and The Coffin is too Big for the Hole (2017)
- Club Tempest (2018)
- Half Lives (2018)
- Hamlet (2019)
- Homesick (2019)
- Crazy Christmas (2019)
- Work/Home Balance (2020; online)
- The Morning People (2020)
- Romeo & Juliet (2020)
- First Light (2020)
- Homesick (2021)
- Crazy Christmas (2021)
- Doubt: A Parable (2023)
- Tender Submission (2023)
