= List of films banned in Singapore =

This is a list of films banned in Singapore. It includes films were banned, or refused classification for screening in the country due to issues of virtue, either by law or by the Board of Film Censors, as part of Infocomm Media Development Authority (IMDA) of Singapore.

The list also includes films that were previously banned but were subsequently passed with different classification ratings.

== List ==
Date	Film	Notes
1971–2011	A Clockwork Orange	Banned for over 30 years, before an attempt at release was made in 2006. However, the submission for a M18 rating was rejected, and the ban was not lifted. The ban was later lifted, and the film was shown uncut with an R21 rating on 28 October 2011, as part of the Perspectives Film Festival.
1973	The Exorcist	Banned upon initial release, and subsequently rated M18 with cuts made to "a scene of a disfigured statue of the Virgin Mary, and a scene of possessed Regan MacNeil stabbing herself in the crotch with a crucifix while uttering “Jesus fuck you!”...[for] “films that denigrate any religious group” and “language that denigrates religion or is religiously profane”".
1973	Last Tango in Paris	Banned for its strong sexual content.
1974–2004	The Texas Chain Saw Massacre	Banned for 30 years. Passed uncut after 2004 with an M18 rating for violence.
1975	Salò, or the 120 Days of Sodom	Banned due to graphic violence and nudity.
1979	Monty Python's Life of Brian	Banned for "inappropriate" religious content.
1980	Cannibal Holocaust	Banned due to its extremely violent content and actual on-screen killings of animals.
1980–2006	Saint Jack	Banned for the "excessive edits required to the scenes of nudity and some coarse language before it could be shown to a general audience". The film was reclassified to an M18 rating in 2006.
1981–2011	The Evil Dead	Banned since its release in 1981; authorities disallowed it for "excessive graphic violence and gore". Ban lifted in 2011 and reclassified R21.
1986	The Texas Chainsaw Massacre 2	Banned by the authority. Subsequently, rated R21 the movie included graphic violence and its high level of bloody, brutal and its disturbing content.
1988	The Last Temptation of Christ	Banned for blasphemous content.
1989	Begotten	Reportedly banned in Singapore, this experimental horror film depicts the allegorical death and rebirth of a God-like figure with graphic violence and sexual imagery throughout.
2001–2004	Zoolander	Banned without a reason given, though the plot is about a man who is brainwashed to assassinate the Prime Minister of Malaysia, a neighbouring country, which also banned the film. Passed uncut after 2004 with an NC16 rating.
2004	Formula 17	Banned because it "portrayed homosexuality as normal, a natural progression of society."
2005–2009	Singapore Rebel	Banned for being a political film, which is not allowed in Singapore. In 2009 the film was reviewed by the Political Films Consultative Committee (PFCC) and unbanned, with an M18 rating.
2006	Shortbus	Banned because of pornographic content.
2007	Following Desire	Banned for "excessive sexual acts and stage performances of a sexual nature which are prolonged, gratuitous and exploitative".
2007	Zahari's 17 Years	Banned because, according to the Government of Singapore, it is "against public interests".
2008	A Jihad for Love	Banned for discussing the relationship between Islam & homosexuality and featuring homosexual Muslims discussing intolerance they’ve faced within their religious communities.
2008	David the Tolhidan	Banned for its "sympathetic portrayal of an organisation viewed as a terrorist organisation by many countries".
2008	Arabs and Terrorism	Banned for its "sympathetic portrayal of an organisation viewed as a terrorist organisation by many countries".
2008	Bakushi	Banned for its "several prolonged and explicit sado-masochistic sequences, demonstrating how the rope masters tied up nude women and subjected them to various degrees of physical abuse and sexual degradation, for the erotic gratification of their audience".
2009	Female Games	Banned for its "explicit lesbian sex acts".
2009	Boy	Banned because it "romanticizes and promotes homosexual relationships. The sexual sequence is prolonged, intense and titillates".
2009	Brides of Allah	Banned because it "promotes and justifies the act of terrorism, and uses religion to justify its cause".
2009	Transgressor (School of the Holy Beast)	Banned because it "portrayed nuns as lesbians with depictions of sadomasochism as well as bondage in many of the scenes".
2010	Dr Lim Hock Siew	Banned due to similar reasons for the film Zahari's 17 Years
2012	Sex.Violence.FamilyValues	Banned because of Porn Masala, the second story in Ken Kwek's compendium of three short films. It was deemed "racially offensive and demeaning to Indians" by the Board of Film Censors. The ban was subsequently lifted and the film's Singapore version released with edits in March 2013. However, the film had not completed its Singapore theatrical run when it was banned by the Malaysian Board of Film Censors, who found it "obscene" and "insulting to local cultures". The film was also withdrawn from the ASEAN International Film Festival & Awards, where it was due to be screened from 28–30 Mar 2013.
2013	Vishwaroopam	See also: Vishwaroopam controversies For the depiction of the war on terror, perceived as a negative portrayal of Muslims. It was later released with a NC16 rating.
2014	To Singapore, With Love	Banned because it allegedly undermined national security as "the individuals in the film have given distorted and untruthful accounts of how they came to leave Singapore and remain outside Singapore," and that "a number of these self-professed 'exiles' were members of, or had provided support to, the proscribed Communist Party of Malaya."
2021	Benedetta	Banned for "its portrayal of Jesus Christ and members of the church in a manner that is insensitive and offensive to the Christian and Catholic faith".
2022	The Kashmir Files	Banned "for its provocative and one-sided portrayal of Muslims and the depictions of Hindus being persecuted in the on-going conflict in Kashmir". Another Indian movie banned in Singapore.
2022	#LookAtMe	Banned as it "contains content that denigrates a religious community and has the potential to cause enmity and social division in Singapore’s multi-racial and multi-religious society"
2024	Small Hours Of The Night	Banned because the film involves a real 1980s court case involving a political dissident's tombstone in Singapore. IMDA has assessed the film to be "prejudicial to national interests".
