= Reggie Verghese =

Singaporean musician (1947–2015)

Reginald 'Reggie' Verghese
- Verghese in 1972

Background information
- Also known as: Reggie
- Born: Reginald Chua; 16 August 1947
- Died: 17 June 2015
- Genre: Rock
- Occupation: Musician
- Instrument: Guitar
- Formerly of: The Quests

Reginald "Reggie" Verghese (16 August 1947 – 17 June 2015) was a Singaporean musician and record producer, known as Singapore's first guitar hero of the 1960s. During the 1960s, he was a member of Singaporean band The Quests. He later moved into production, producing work for acts such as Matthew and the Mandarins, Frankie Cheah, Anita Sarawak, Western Union Band, Jennifer Yen, and Tracy Huang.

== Career ==
=== The Quests ===
Around 1963, while still in secondary school, he was a member of a group called The Checkmates. In 1964, the guitarist for The Quests, Raymond Leong, had left the group to pursue his studies. Verghese took his place. In a matter of months, the group had a no.1 hit with "Shanty". His guitar playing in the song attracted a lot of attention. Along with Jap Chong, sharing the vocals, he stayed with the group throughout all of the line up changes until the group's break up in 1971. He then moved into production.

=== Production ===
In 1977, Verghese produced the debut self-titled album for The Western Union Band which had evolved out of a 1960s group called The Rubber Band and featured songs such as, "Sausolito" and "Howzit". He produced the self-titled album for Matthew & The Mandarins which was released on EMI and contained the song "Singapore Cowboy". The song would eventually become a big hit in Singapore, reaching no. 1. Verghese also produced their next album, II, which was released in 1979 also on EMI.

In 1984, together with Ken Lim and three other partners, Verghese formed Boogie Productions Pte Ltd and took over the recording studio and equipment from EMI Singapore Pte Ltd which had closed down.

== Death ==
Having suffered from heart and liver problems for a few years, Verghese died of heart failure at Khoo Teck Puat Hospital on 17 June 2015. He was 67.

== Discography ==
Album
Act	Title	Release	Year	Notes #
Reg Guitar	Guitar Sound Of Hit Tunes	Regal SREG-9525	1971	
Reg Guitar	Guitar Sound Of Hit Tunes Vol.III	Regal SREG-9541	1972	
Reg Guitar	Guitar Sound Of Hit Tunes Vol.6	Regal SREG-9828	1974	
Reg Guitar	Kung Fu	Regal SREG 9815	1974	
