= Emma Yong =

Malaysian-born Singaporean actress and singer

- Born: Emma Yong Oi-Mun; 20 January 1975; Kuala Lumpur, Malaysia
- Died: 2 May 2012 (aged 37); Singapore General Hospital, Singapore
- Resting place: Mandai Crematorium and Columbarium
- Education: Mountview Academy of Theatre Arts
- Occupations: Actress, singer
- Years active: 1975–2012
- Spouses: Gerald Chew (m. 2003; div. 2003) Jerry Lim (m. 2011–2012)
- Musical career
- Formerly of: Dim Sum Dollies

Emma Yong Oi-Mun (楊愛曼, 20 January 1975 – 2 May 2012) was a Singaporean actress and singer. She was an actress for MediaCorp from the late 1990s until her death.

== Education ==
Born in Kuala Lumpur, Malaysia on 20 January 1975, Yong studied in Raffles Girls' School and then Raffles Junior College and won the Angus Ross prize – given to the A-level student with the best English literature exam score outside of the United Kingdom – in 1994.

In 2002, Yong went to Mountview Academy of Theatre Arts, London where she graduated with a postgraduate degree in musical theatre.

== Acting career ==
After Yong finished her A-Levels, she went for open auditions and was cast in musicals Bugis Street (1994) and Mortal Sins (1995). She appeared in the film, The Blue Mansion, in 2009 as Mei-Yi, a wealthy tycoon’s oppressed daughter-in-law, and was noted to be the first professional actress to appear in a nude scene in a Singaporean-made film.

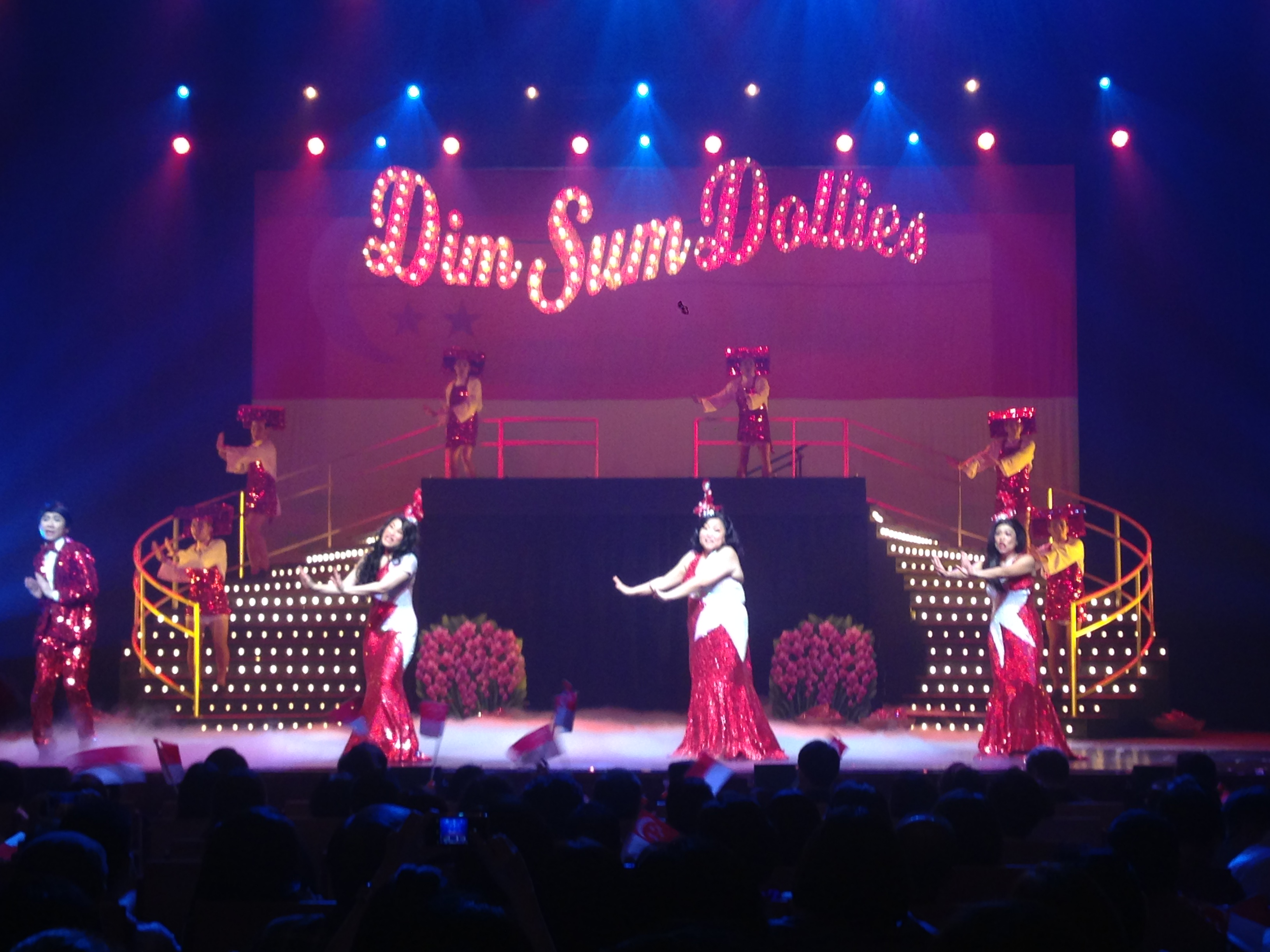
Emma Yong Oi-Mun in Dim Sum Dollies

In 2010, she was in the music group called Dim Sum Dollies.

== Filmography ==
=== Theatre ===
- Bugis Street (1994)
- Mortal Sins (1995)
- Ka-Ra-you-OK? as Electric Geisha (1996)
- Forbidden City: Portrait of An Empress (2002)
- Aladdin (2004)
- Cabaret as Sally Bowles (2006)
- The Magic Fundoshi (2006)
- Shanghai Blues (2008)
- SING Dollar! (2009)
- Beauty And The Beast (2009)
- Cinderel-lah! (2010)
- Into The Woods (2011)

=== Film ===
- The Blue Mansion (2009)
- It's a Great, Great World (2011)

== Personal life ==
Yong married actor Gerald Chew in 2003 and divorced 9 months later.

In January 2011, Yong was diagnosed with stomach cancer. A few months later, she married her long time boyfriend, Jerry Lim, an interior designer. She started treatment for her cancer after her marriage. The treatment went well and the cancer was in remission. A routine scan in September showed her cancer relapsed.

== Death ==
Yong died of stomach cancer on 2 May 2012 aged 37, after a 17-month battle with the disease. Yong is survived by her parents and two sisters. Her funeral took place at Mandai Crematorium on 4 May 2012.

An Emma Yong Fund was set up after her death to helps artists who are critically ill. A memorial concert was held in remembrance of Yong and to raise money for the Fund. The concert was held at the Esplanade who loaned the use of its Concert Hall for free with all performers performing for free. Ticketing agent, SISTIC, also donated the collected handling fees to charity. Performers included the two other Dim Sum Dollies, Selena Tan and Pam Oei, Sebastian "Broadway Beng" Tan, Karen Tan, Tan Kheng Hua, Denise Tan (who replaced Yong as one of the Dim Sum Dollies), Ivan Heng and Glen Goei. More than $275,500 was raised through the concert.
