= Matthew Tan =

Singaporean musician and bandleader (born 1945)

- Also known as: Matthew L.K. Tan, Bristow Hopper
- Born: 1945 (age 80–81)
- Genre: Country
- Occupations: Musician, bandleader
- Instrument: Guitar
- Labels: Life, EMI
- Member of: Matthew and the Mandarins

Matthew Tan is a Singaporean musician and bandleader. He has led Matthew and the Mandarins in its various forms since the 1960s. He is also the co-composer of the hit songs "Singapore Cowboy" and "Let's Put The Sing In Singapore".

== Background ==
Tan leads the band Matthew and the Mandarins, formed in 1961.

Tan was the first Asian to ever perform at the Grand Ole Opry.

== Career ==
=== 1960s to 1970s ===
By the mid-1960s his band was playing in hotels.

In 1975, Tan flew to Nashville, Tennessee, United States, where the country and western action was. There, he performed at the Grand Ole Opry and did a duet with Skeeter Davis. He spent 18 months there before returning to Singapore.

By the 1970s his group had achieved a large following. Following their signing to EMI Singapore in 1978, his band performed in Canada, Hong Kong, Indonesia, Japan, Malaysia, Thailand and the United States.

Along with Bristow Hopper, he co-wrote "Singapore Cowboy". The song became a number 1 hit in Singapore. It was featured on the Matthew And The Mandarins 1978 album. With Hopper, he also co-wrote "Let's Put The Sing In Singapore". This song was included on the Matthew and the Mandarins II album, released in 1979.

=== Later years ===
Tan became the subject of a 2012 documentary titled Singapore Country. The filmmaker, Wee Li Lin, paid tribute to "Singapore Cowboy" and Tan.

On November 8, 2013, Tan was the musical director of a concert which featured Jimmy Chan, Gina Vadham, Henry Suriya, Hillary Francis, Mel and Joe, and Frank and Robyn. His band, The Mandarins was also the house band for the event.

In 2014, Tan played at the Canberra Country Blues & Roots Festival. He was one of two artists to receive a Lifetime Achievement Award, the Asia-Pacific Lifetime Achievement Award.
