= LookAtMe =

#LookAtMe
- Poster of #LookAtMe
- Directed by: Ken Kwek
- Release date: 23 July 2022 (New York Asian Film Festival)
- Running time: 108 minutes
- Country: Singapore
- Language: English

#LookAtMe is a 2022 Singaporean film directed by Ken Kwek. It was premiered at 2022 New York Asian Film Festival. The film was inspired by Amos Yee's 2015 vlogs that criticised Lee Kuan Yew and Christianity, and other real life events.

== Synopsis ==
Sean and Ricky Mazuki are twins who live with their mother, Nancy. Ricky is gay, while Sean has a girlfriend, Mia. Mia invites the twins to the evangelical megachurch she attends where the pastor, Josiah Long, gives a homophobic sermon. The brothers become enraged and disgusted by the sermon, leading Sean to create a vlog by casting himself to criticize Josiah in a bad light. The vlog goes viral, which earns Sean a defamation lawsuit and a jail sentence for violating Singapore's laws on "hurting religious feelings" and "spreading fake news" for mocking Christianity.

== Cast ==
- yao (Note: formerly known as Thomas Pang. His current name is styled as 'yao'.) as Sean and Ricky Mazuki (twins)
- Pam Oei as Nancy
- Ching Shu Yi as Mia
- Adrian Pang as Josiah Long
- Janice Koh as Gabriella Long

== Reception ==
Martin Lukanov of Asian Movie Pulse akins the scenes of Josiah Long giving his sermon to "a real video by a real church leader". Anthony Kao of Cinema Escapist writes that the film's choice to switch between genres was effective: family drama to build sympathy for the Mazuki family with the audience and tragedy and prison exploitation illustrating how the family's lives are spinning out of control. Niina Doherty of Eastern Kicks writes that "Kwek's criticism of [the societal issues of Singapore or its legal system] is subtle and effective". Akash Deshpande of High on Films writes that although the film had a chance of making a larger statement, it became "a reactionary work, which dulls its overall impact".

At the 2022 New York Asian Film Festival, the film won a Special Jury Mention for Best Performer for its lead actor, yao.

On 17 October 2022, the film was refused classification by Infocomm Media Development Authority (17 Oct 2022), which effectively barred the film from being screened in Singapore for "its potential to cause enmity and social division". IMDA, Ministry of Culture, Community and Youth, and Ministry of Home Affairs also stated that the pastor in the film engages "in an act prohibited by his professed religious faiths"; that the depictions of the pastor in the film are "suggestive of a real pastor in Singapore", and the allegations may be "perceived to be offensive, defamatory and contrary to the Maintenance of Religious Harmony Act". The film was scheduled to be screened at 2022 Singapore International Film Festival. However, even with the ban, the festival decided to include the film in its advertised line-up, though the film was marked as unavailable for screening. The director, Ken Kwek and producers decided not to appeal IMDA's decision, as after assessing the authorities' decision, they concluded that the possibility of the appeal being be successful would be "exceedingly slim".

== See also ==
- John Denver Trending, a 2019 Filipino independent film with a similar plot.
