= Unlucky Plaza =

- Film poster
- Directed by: Ken Kwek
- Written by: Ken Kwek
- Produced by: Ken Kwek; Kat Goh; Leon Tong
- Starring: Epy Quizon; Adrian Pang; Judee Tan; Shane Mardjuki; Guo Liang
- Cinematography: Michael Zaw
- Edited by: Olly Stothert
- Music by: Joe Ng; Ting Si Hao
- Production company: Kaya Toast Pictures
- Distributed by: Shaw Organisation
- Release date: 4 September 2014 (TIFF)
- Running time: 122 minutes
- Country: Singapore
- Language: English
- Budget: S$800,000
- Box office: US$46,331 (Singapore)

Unlucky Plaza is a 2014 Singaporean black comedy thriller film written and directed by Ken Kwek. It stars Epy Quizon as a Filipino immigrant to Singapore who takes hostages after falling for a scam. It premiered at the Toronto International Film Festival and was released in Singapore on 16 April 2015. The story is told in a series of flashbacks from the point of view of a talk show that has reunited the captor and his former hostages.

== Premise ==
Filipino immigrant Onassis Hernandez mistreats his restaurant workers, causing a disgruntled cook to sabotage an inspection by the Singaporean health department. After Hernandez subsequently falls for a popular rental scam that targets immigrants, he takes several Singaporeans hostage and broadcasts his demands for social change on YouTube.

== Cast ==
- Epy Quizon as Onassis Hernandez
- Adrian Pang as Sky
- Judee Tan as Michelle Chan
- Shane Mardjuki as Pastor Tong Wen
- Guo Liang as Baby Bear
- Christian Wong as Popoy
- Andrew Lua as Ping
- Osman Sulaiman as Inspector Asman
- Janice Koh as Cindy
- Pam Oei as Mrs. Heng
- Anita Kapoor as herself

== Production ==
The film was based on reports of rental scams that were popular on immigrants.

== Release ==
Unlucky Plaza premiered at the 2014 Toronto International Film Festival on 4 September 2014. Its Singaporean premiere was at the Singapore International Film Festival on 4 December 2014. Shaw Organisation released it in Singapore on 16 April 2015, and it grossed US$46,331. Cinemaflix Entertainment released it in the US in January 2016. & finally released in the Philippines co-produced by VIVA Films in April 2016.

== Reception ==
Collecting four American reviews, Metacritic, a review aggregator, rated it 38/100. Stephanie Luo of AsiaOne rated it 3.5/5 stars and wrote that it "highlights real issues in Singapore society well", though it has several unrealistic scenes. Iliyas Ong of Time Out Singapore rated it 2/5 stars and wrote the film's social satire, "As belaboured and on-the-nose as Kwek's point is, it's also terrifyingly real." Clarence Tsui of The Hollywood Reporter wrote, "Sentimentality and small-screen aesthetics turn social critique into soap opera." Nicolas Rapold of The New York Times wrote that the talk show framing device "destroys the suspense and seals a sense of the movie as both slick and amateurish". Martin Tsai of the Los Angeles Times wrote, "Writer-director Ken Kwek means for the proceedings to be farcical, but seldom are they actually funny." Simon Abrams of The Village Voice wrote, "Kwek's refreshing focus on his terrorized protagonists' pre-abduction lives keeps Unlucky Plaza afloat once it invests in generic ticking-clock thrills."
