= Daisy Devan =

Singaporean businesswoman

- Daisy Devan, probably in the 1960s.
- Born: 1928; Malaya
- Died: 2009 (aged 80–81); Singapore
- Occupations: Executive Producer, Businesswoman

Daisy E. Devan (1928-2009) was a Singaporean businesswoman and producer, called "Singapore's Mother Music". She was inducted into the Singapore Women's Hall of Fame posthumously, in 2018. She was also the executive producer of the original recording of Majulah Singapura, Singapore's national anthem, when Singapore separated from Malaysia in 1965.

== Early life ==
Devan was born in Malaya, the daughter of Indian parents.

== Career ==
Devan worked in the rubber industry with Société des Matieres Premieres Tropicales, before becoming involved in the music business. She was Artistes and Repertoire Manager of EMI in Singapore beginning in 1957. Her discoveries included The Quests and Sarena Hashim, and she promoted the work of Kartina Dahari, Anita Sarawak, Taiwanese singer Tracy Huang, and Sharifah Aini. She also set up Singapore's first record-pressing factory in Jurong, as well as several EMI retail outlets.

In addition to popular music, Devan recorded traditional Malaysian music in various languages and genres. In 1965, she produced the first official recording of Singapore's national anthem. After she retired from the music business in 1981, she and her husband ran a health food store.

Devan was one of the founders of Singapore's Business and Professional Women’s Club. She was a judge for Discovery Talentime 1975, a musical talent contest on Radio Television Singapore.

== Personal life and legacy ==
Daisy Devan was married to Albert Devan. She had been a widow for sixteen years when she died at her home in Clementi in 2009, aged 81 years. In 2017, a program about Devan, When Mother Music Comes to Tea by Khir Johari, was featured at the Singapore International Festival of Arts. In 2018, she was posthumously inducted into the Singapore Women's Hall of Fame.
