= Yao (actor) =

Malaysian actor

- Born: Thomas Pang; 1989 or 1990 (age 36–37); Australia
- Education: University of the Arts Singapore (BA); Yale University (MFA)
- Known for: Bo Chow in Sinners

Thomas Pang (born 1989 or 1990), known by the stage name Yao, is a Malaysian-Filipino actor based in the United States. He is known for playing Bo Chow in Ryan Coogler's film Sinners (2025).

== Early life and education ==
Yao was born Thomas Pang in Australia to a Filipino mother and Malaysian Chinese father. His stage name, Yao, "is derived from his Chinese name" and is used to pay homage to his great-grandfather.

Yao holds Malaysian citizenship, though he has constantly moved between countries since childhood. He relocated to the Philippines when he was two, subsequently moving between Malaysia and Singapore before settling briefly in London at five, and later in the United States at nine, where he attended high school. He returned to Malaysia at 19 and spent three years in Kuala Lumpur.

He is a graduate of the Lasalle College of the Arts at University of the Arts Singapore in Singapore, and holds a Master of Fine Arts degree in acting from the David Geffen School of Drama at Yale University in 2023.

== Career ==
Yao was active in Singaporean theatre and television, winning a Straits Times Life Theatre Award for Best Actor for his performance in Hand to God at the Singapore Repertory Theatre. He starred on the Singaporean television series Scrum Tigers and The Last Bout.

Yao has appeared in Singaporean movies like Tiong Bahru Social Club and #LookAtMe. For his doubling role in the latter, he was awarded Best Performance by the 2022 New York Asian Film Festival.

In 2025, Yao made his Hollywood debut in Ryan Coogler's Sinners as Bo Chow, a Chinese American grocery store owner and husband of Grace Chow, acted by Li Jun Li. Yao had auditioned, via tape, while living in Labrador Park, Singapore; after landing the role, he and Li researched more about Chinese Americans in the Mississippi Delta. For the film's juke joint dance sequence wherein various cultural personages are represented, Yao was asked by the film crew to propose the Asian diaspora's iconic figures, after which he suggested that Sun Wukong make an appearance.

== Personal life ==
Yao is now based in Brooklyn, New York City.

== Filmography ==
=== Film ===
Year	Title	Role	Director	Notes
2020	Tiong Bahru Social Club	Ah Bee	Tan Bee Thiam	Credited as 'Thomas Pang'
2022	#LookAtMe	Sean Marzuki / Ricky Marzuki	Ken Kwek	
2025	Sinners	Bo Chow	Ryan Coogler	
2027	John Rambo †		Jalmari Helander	Post-production
TBA	Better Life †		Jessica Liu	Post-production
TBA	Rooster †		Mills McQueen	Post-production
TBA	Gold Mountain †		Ang Lee	Filming

==== Short films ====
Year	Title	Role	Director	Notes
2014	Kill the Rabbit	Frank	Phil Giordano	
2017	Marathon	Interior Ministry Soldier	We Jun Cho	

=== Television ===
Year	Title	Role	Notes
2019	Scrum Tigers	Terry	15 episodes
2023–2024	The Last Bout	Tommy Law	11 episodes
