= The Blue Mansion =

- Directed by: Glen Goei
- Written by: Ken Kwek
- Produced by: Glen Goei; Tommy Tan; Pauline Yu; Chowee Leow; Sacha Brooks; Kate James
- Cinematography: Larry Smith
- Edited by: Kate James
- Music by: David Hirschfelder
- Release dates: 13 October 2009 (PIFF); 22 October 2009 (Singapore)
- Running time: 100 minutes
- Country: Singapore
- Language: English
- Budget: S$2.8 million
- Box office: US$146,800

The Blue Mansion is a 2009 film directed by Glen Goei. The film had its world premiere at the 14th Pusan International Film Festival and was released in Singaporean theatres in an edited NC16 version at the request of the distributor on 22 October 2009. The uncut version was classified M18 by the Media Development Authority. The film was the opening film of the Berlin Asian Hot Shots Film Festival 2010 and was in competition at the Tokyo International Film Festival 2009 and the Shanghai International Film Festival 2010. It debuted in Kuala Lumpur on 18 March 2010 and was shown in Penang during the George Town Festival 2010.

== Premise ==
The Blue Mansion is a quirky murder mystery about a wealthy Asian tycoon who dies suddenly under mysterious circumstances and returns as a ghost to try to uncover the secret of his death. Two eager detectives investigate the death, chasing all leads and suspects, including the dead man's three children. The ghost witnesses his own funeral wake, attended by jealous relatives and business competitors as well as the police investigation that unveils hidden family secrets.

== Cast ==
- Patrick Teoh as Wee Bak Chuan
- Louisa Chong as Wee Siok Lin
- Lim Kay Siu as Wee Teck Liang
- Adrian Pang as Wee Teck Meng

| Actor/Actress | Role |
|---|---|
| Neo Swee Lin | Wee Pei Shan |
| Emma Yong | Wee Mei Yi |
| Claire Wong | Wee Ye Ching |
| Tan Kheng Hua | Veronica Wee |
| Huzir Sulaiman | Inspector Suresh |
| Steve Yap | Inspector Tan Kok Leong |
| Denise Chan | Wee Jia Wen |
| Ben Tan | Wee Bak How |
| Deborah Png | Rosie Wee |
| Pam Oei | Daisy Wee |
| Wendy Kweh | Lily Wee |
| Karen Tan | Violet Wee |
| Bridget Therese Lachica | Aida |
| Mariel Reyes | Tessie |
| Chermaine Ang | China Girl |
| Zahim Albakri | Mr De Cruz |
| Himanshu Bhatt | Raj |

== Production ==
Director Glen Goei sold his home in London to raise the film's S$2.8 million budget, which Goei exceeded.

The movie was filmed entirely on location in Penang at the Cheong Fatt Tze Mansion, a UNESCO Architectural Heritage Award recipient, over 6 weeks in 2008. Goei was hoping to shoot in Singapore but couldn't find a grand mansion that hadn't been demolished.

To hire production designer Ian Bailey, whose work on Atonement and Pride & Prejudice Goei had admired, Goei bought a film directory from the British Film Institute and called him. He also called 10 cinematographers simultaneously, and director of photography Larry Smith was the first to respond.

The Blue Mansion was originally called The Funeral Party. Its screenplay took three years to write and the film more than a decade to produce.

== Reception ==
=== Box office ===
The Blue Mansion earned a respectable S$70,465 in its opening weekend on 12 prints in Singapore and ultimately earned US$146,800 after five weeks.

The film failed to garner international distribution, which Goei blames for causing him to lose all the money he had made on Forever Fever.

=== Critical reception ===
The Blue Mansion was fairly well received by critics. Derek Elley of Variety praised director Glen Goei for keeping the film "nicely balanced between comedy and drama" and making "cinematic use of his single location". However, he blamed Ken Kwek's "gauche" script, with its "weak third act and dialogue more suited to the stage than the screen", for letting down Goei's evident "ambition to make quality commercial fare".

The Jakarta Post called The Blue Mansion "one of Singapore's most stylish movies" and noted its "new perspective on the Singaporean world of cinema" and "splendid cast". The Urban Wire praised "the director’s attention to detail" and the film's "intriguing mystery", "well-developed characters", "solid acting", "cleverly crafted humour", "fabulous cinematography" and "brilliant music", but found its ending confusing.

Lisa-Ann Lee of SG magazine awarded it 2.5/5, praising it as "a valiant effort" and "a very polished production" even if "you get the feeling that you’ve seen it all before" and "it makes that sharp turn toward melodrama and the bizarre near the end". Nevertheless, she called for audiences to give it a chance as "Goei has taken a huge gamble by directing the most articulate and literate local film to date". Genevieve Loh of TODAY gave the film 3/5, comparing this "ambitious and slick second talkie" to Robert Altman's Gosford Park. She praised the "cleverly lit and beautifully framed" film's "storyline [for] hitting bravely close to home" even if there are times when the film "feels overwrought with the mixing of one-too-many genres".

Academic Kenneth Paul Tan analysed The Blue Mansion in the NETPAC journal Cinemas of Asia, arguing that "the film points to the larger tragedy of authoritarian cultures of conformity and dependency" and "shows the folly and danger of chauvinistic attitudes that fester within society". Tan also noted how "identifying the parallels between the family/corporate world in the film and the family/political world in Singapore is, in fact, one of the film's many pleasures". Fridae called it "easily the must-watch of the week" and noted how online commentators had drawn "parallels between Wee Bak Chuan and Singapore’s founding father Lee Kuan Yew", adding that "there’s no denying how powerfully layered a satire it becomes because of them".

=== Recognition ===
==== In competition ====
- Tokyo International Film Festival 2009
- Shanghai International Film Festival 2010

==== Opening film ====
- Berlin Asian Hot Shot Film Festival 2010

==== Official selection ====
- Pusan International Film Festival 2009
- Hong Kong International Film Festival 2010
- Taipei International Film Festival 2010
- Hawaii International Film Festival 2010
- International Film Festival of India 2010
- Jakarta International Film Festival 2010
