= Matthew and the Mandarins =

County music band from Singapore

- Origin: Singapore
- Genre: Country
- Years active: 1960s–present
- Labels: Life, EMI
- Members: Matthew Tan; Patrick Favacho; Rawi B Omar; Michael Png

Matthew and the Mandarins are a country music band from Singapore, active since the 1960s. Among their singles were "Singapore Cowboy" (1978) and "Let's Put the Sing in Singapore" (1979).

== Background ==
Mathew Tan is the leader of the group. The group was formed by Tan under the name Matthew Tan and the Mandarins in 1961. By the mid-1960s, they were appearing in hotels. By the 1970s, as Matthew and the Mandarins, they had achieved a large following. Following their signing to EMI Singapore in 1978, they performed in Canada, Hong Kong, Indonesia, Japan, Malaysia, Thailand and the United States. They had a number 1 hit with "Singapore Cowboy".

One of the venues they played at was the Golden Peacock Lounge at the Shangri-la Hotel. One of their shows there was watched by Taiwanese singer Teresa Teng.

The group is mentioned in an L.A. Weekly article about L.A. DJ and musician Chad Brown in his quest to find rare and interesting records. Along with a record by the "Jose Feliciano of Malaysia", Alfred Ho, he rated the Matthew & the Mandarins record as one of his best finds.

== Career ==
=== 1960s ===
The group backed Anita Sarawak on her With a Lot O' Soul EP which was released in 1969. The songs were "Yesterday's Gone", "Where Did Our Love Go", "I'm Your Special Fool" and "Hi-Heel Sneakers".

=== 1970s ===
Matthew and Co. had an LP released on Life Records in 1974. The album was credited to Mathew with the Mandarins. It featured Matthew Tan on rhythm guitar, Neal Alexander on lead guitar, Richard Danker on bass, piano and organ and Jeffrey Goh on drums and tambourine. Songs on the album included "Louisiana Man", "Is Anybody Goin' to San Antone", "Folsom Prison Blues" and "Snakes Crawl at Night".

In 1978, their self-titled album, Matthew & the Mandarins was released on EMI EMGS 5016. By September that year, the group had sold 5000 copies of their recently cut record. One copy was sent over to the organizers of the Tulsa International Festival. As a result, the group was invited to go to Oklahoma to take part in the international music festival, held in November that year. The festival which had an attendance of 8000 the previous year had nine countries coming over. In September that year, the group's line-up consisted of Matthew Tan, Michael Png, Derek Danker, Richard Danker and Philip Monteiro.

Their album II was released in 1979. Produced by Reggie Verghese, it contained some original compositions as well as covers by Tan and Bristow Hopper. Bristow Hopper had in the past worked with Roy Orbison. The first song on side was "Let's Put the Sing in Singapore". Other songs include covers of Kenny Rogers' "Love or Something Like It", Kris Kristofferson's "Stranger", Johnny Horton's "North to Alaska" and the song "Shenandoah". In a 2016 review of the album, some 37 years after its release, Pat Padua of Spectrum Culture talking about dollar bins being a great place to get acquainted with music from a faraway said it was the kind of dollar bin album that you'd pick up as a joke but turns out to be serious fun. Also in 1979, according to Billboard in their 18 August issue, the group was no longer with EMI and they had signed to WEA.

=== 1980s to 1990s ===
In 1980, Tan mentioned the problem with pirating. As mentioned in the 16 August issue of Billboard, he said his records had not done as well as expected due to the version by the pirates coming out the day after the official release.

In 1991, the band was re-formed when Png, the band's former guitar player, suggested Tan to re-form the band. The re-formed band included Frisco Lim and bassist Eric Tan. The band added evergreens and rock and roll to their repertoire.

In 1992, EMI released The Very Best of Matthew & the Mandarins which featured "Singapore Cowboy", "Broken lady", "Lucille" and a duet with Sarah Chen, "I Really Don't Want To Know".

The 27 July 1996 issue of Billboard noted that EMI had released two compilations by Singaporean act The Quests and an album by Matthew & the Mandarins. EMI Singapore managing director said that there wasn't any plan to re-launch any careers. The albums were just for the fans that remember.

=== 2000s ===
Tan became the subject of Singapore Country, a 2012 documentary by Wee Li Lin in which the film-maker paid tribute to the song as well as the artist.

On 8 November 2013, The Mandarins were the house band for the Yesterday Once More II concert, held at the Esplanade Concert Hall. Tan was also the musical director of the concert which featured Jimmy Chan, Gina Vadham, Henry Suriya, Hillary Francis, Mel and Joe, and Frank and Robyn.

In 2014, Tan was appearing at the Canberra Country Blues & Roots Festival. In addition to playing there, he was one of two artists to receive a Lifetime Achievement Award, the Asia-Pacific Lifetime Achievement Award.

On 4 January 2016 the group performed at a two-concerts event, Coffee Morning & Afternoon Tea, which they performed in the first concert in the morning. The group opened with a Johnny Russell composition, "Catfish John". They performed another 18 songs which included a Hank Williams song " Bayou Country" and the Tanya Tucker song, "Delta Dawn". The last song was "Singapore Cowboy" which had the audience incited the audience's approval and had them singing the refrain and requesting an encore.

Along with Leonard and the Country Riders, Ferdinands, Rani Tofani, and country rock group, S.A.L.T, they appeared at the two-day Singapore Country Line Dance Festival 2017 which was held at the Far East Square on a Friday and then on Saturday at the Goodman Arts Centre.

It was announced in The Straits Times on 24 April 2017 that the group was one of the acts appearing at the Singapore Expo that month.

== Members ==
- Neal Alexander – lead guitar
- Derrick Danker – lead guitar
- Richard Danker – bass, piano, organ
- Jeffrey Goh – drums, tambourine
- Phillip Monteiro – drums
- Michael Png – steel guitar, acoustic guitar
- Matthew Tan – vocals, rhythm guitar

Note: Neal Alexander and Jeffrey Goh only appear on the first album.

== Discography ==
Album
Act	Title	Release	Year	Notes #
Matthew with the Mandarins	Four Seasons	Life	1974	
Matthew and the Mandarins	Matthew & the Mandarins	EMI	1978	
Matthew and the Mandarins	Matthew & the Mandarins II	EMI	1979	
Matthew and the Mandarins	The Very Best of Matthew & the Mandarins	EMI	1992	CD

EP
Act	Title	Release	Year	Notes #
Anita Sarawak	With a Lot O' Soul	Columbia	1969	Mandarins are the backing group
