= Gone Shopping =

- Directed by: Wee Li Lin
- Written by: Wee Li Lin
- Produced by: Fazila 'Fuzzy' Zainol Abideen
- Starring: Kym Ng; Adrian Pang; Aaron Kao; Magdalene Tan; Sonya Nair
- Cinematography: Jackie Ong
- Edited by: Low Hwee Ling
- Music by: Joe Ng; Alex Oh
- Production company: Kismet Films
- Distributed by: Golden Village Entertainment
- Release date: 26 July 2007
- Running time: 104 minutes
- Country: Singapore
- Languages: Mandarin; English; Tamil; Malay; Cantonese
- Budget: $650,000
- Box office: $31,000

Gone Shopping (Chinese: 逛街物语) is a 2007 Singaporean comedy-drama film directed by Wee Li Lin, starring Kym Ng, Adrian Pang, Aaron Kao, Magdalene Tan and Sonya Nair.

== Cast ==
- Kym Ng as Clara Wong
- Adrian Pang as Valentine Tan
- Aaron Kao as Aaron Ho
- Magdalene Tan as Hui Hui
- Sonya Nair as Renu Balakrishnan
- Selena Tan as Pat Huang

== Release ==
The film was released on 26 July 2007. The film's director's cut premiered at the Far East Film Festival in April 2008.

== Reception ==
Derek Elley of Variety wrote, "Elegantly shot on HD, and with a semi-fairy-tale atmosphere, this is something small but fresh from Singapore’s tiny industry." Ong Sor Fern of The Straits Times rated the film 3.5 stars out of 5 and wrote, "Retail therapy has never been quite this entertainingly thoughtful." Geoffrey Eu of The Business Times gave the film a rating of "B-" and wrote that Wee "gives a refreshingly original spin to a familiar Singaporean pastime – and viewers who take a chance on it will come away impressed by a keenly observed cinematic bargain." Stefan of Twitch Film wrote that the film is "well worth the admission ticket, being able to straddle the arty film realm that most local movies seem to fall under, and having the commercial legs as well."
