= Dim Sum Dollies =

Singaporean musical cabaret trio

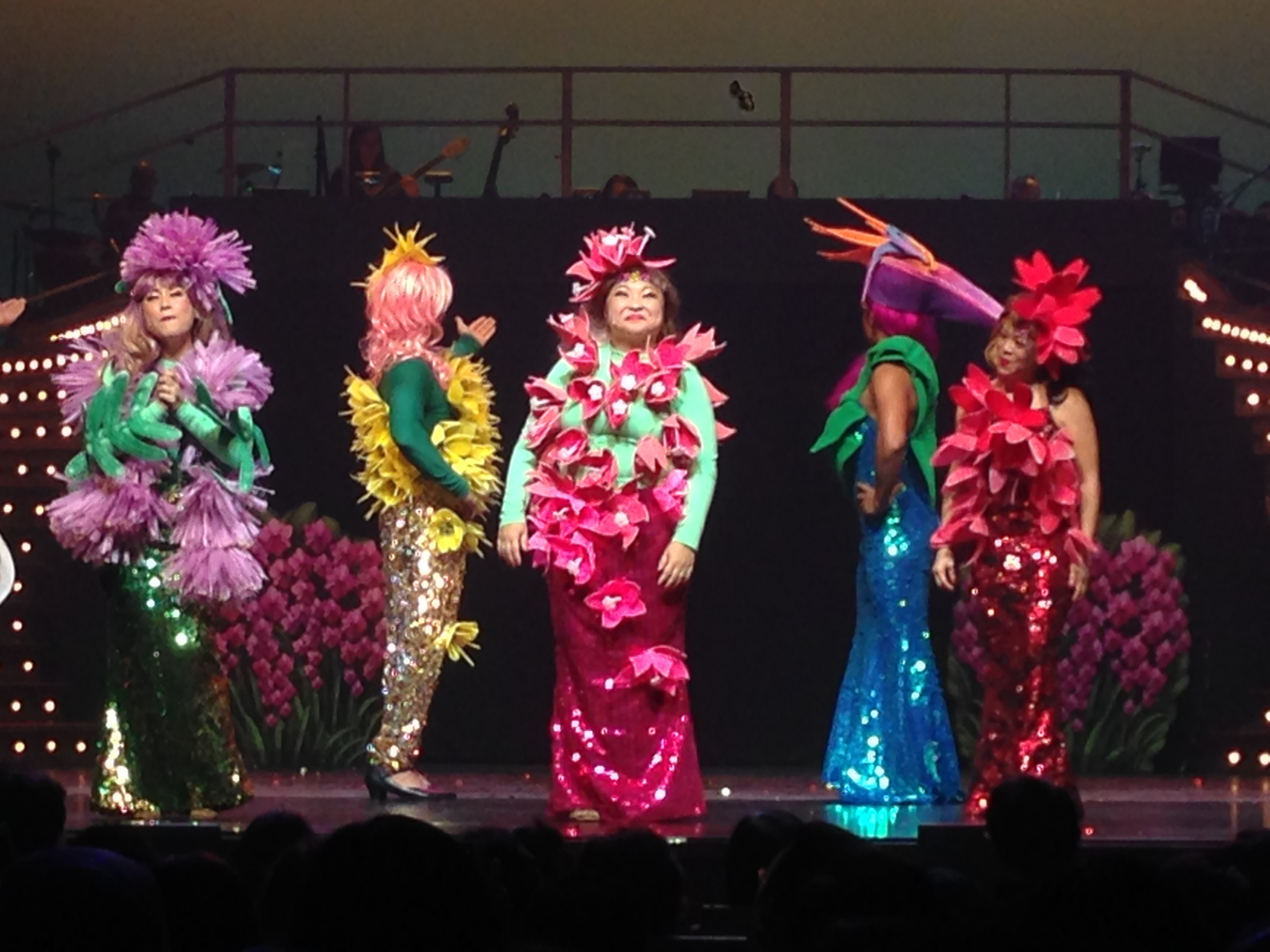
- The Dim Sum Dollies show Dim Sum Dollies: The History of Singapore Part 2 at the Esplanade Theatre, Esplanade – Theatres on the Bay, in December 2014

Background information
- Origin: Singapore
- Genre: cabaret
- Years active: 2002
- Label: Dream Academy
- Members: Selena Tan; Pamela Oei; Jo Tan
- Past members: Emma Yong; Denise Tan
- Website: www.dreamacademy.com.sg Dim Sum Dollies on Facebook

The Dim Sum Dollies is a musical cabaret trio group in Singapore, founded in 2002 by Selena Tan, Emma Yong and Pamela Oei. The Dollies are known for their loud and colourful costumes, spectacular dance scenes and their comical but incisive approach to contemporary social issues in Singapore. Denise Tan completed the trio after the death of Emma Yong in 2012; however she left the Dollies in 2016 to focus on radio hosting and replaced by Jo Tan.

== History ==
The trio began in 2002 with a show at the opening of the Esplanade – Theatres on the Bay, A Single Woman. 2003 saw them perform to a sold-out crowd in the immensely well received Steaming!, which was followed by Revenge of the Dim Sum Dollies in 2004, Dim Sum Dollies: Singapore's Most Wanted in 2005, and Dim Sum Dollies: The History of Singapore! in 2007. In 2006, they lent their names to Glen Goei's adaptation of the off-Broadway musical comedy Little Shop of Horrors performed at Victoria Theatre. According to local director Ivan Heng, the name "Dim Sum Dollies" was chosen because dim sum comes in threes, "each morsel painstakingly prepared to please eye and palate". This description describes the trio's presentation style on stage, which combines visually spectacular sets and costumes with an original take on all things Singaporean.

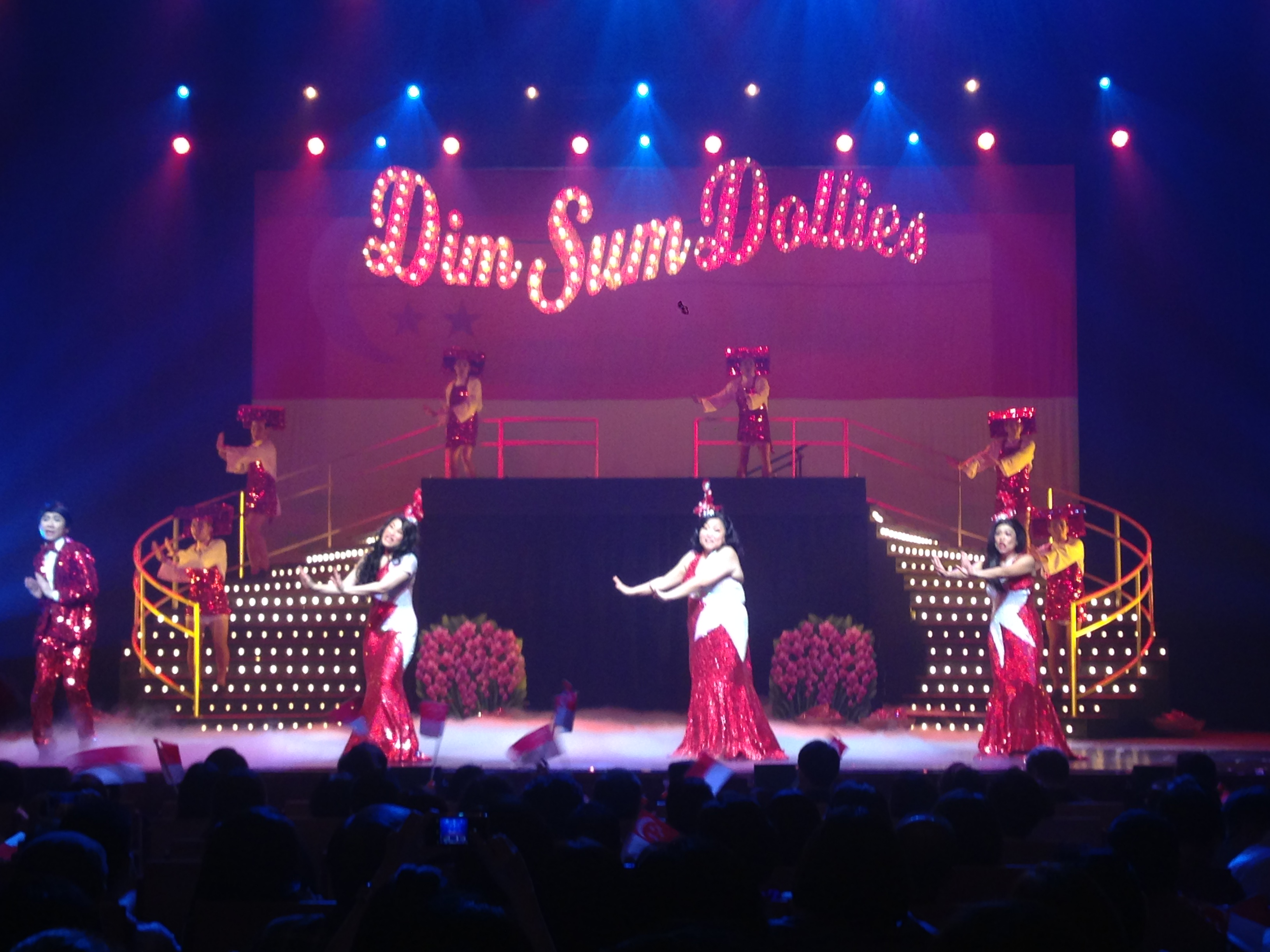
The Dim Sum Dollies show Dim Sum Dollies: The History of Singapore Part 2 at the Esplanade Theatre, Esplanade – Theatres on the Bay, in December 2014

The Dim Sum Dollies are well-remembered for boldly addressing contemporary Singaporean issues in a light-hearted manner. The 2004 instalment, Revenge of the Dim Sum Dollies, had the Dollies dressed up as Filipino maids in a fog-filled heaven (all of them apparently died after falling off ledges while cleaning their employers' windows). In a review by local playwright Alfian Sa'at, he notes with regards to this scene that "there has been an alarming trend of such accidental deaths in Singapore in the past year, and when the audience laughed, it was laughter laced with hurt. This was an instance, so prized in theatre, where one could provoke such contradictory emotions."

Other memorable scenes that year saw the Dollies touching on the plight of much-maligned traffic wardens in "Parking Pontianaks" and donning the trademark kebaya worn by Singapore Airlines stewardesses in "Singapore Girl". In 2005's Dim Sum Dollies: Singapore's Most Wanted, the Dollies came on stage dressed up as food court aunties in one scene, while other segments had them satirizing the National Kidney Foundation Singapore scandal and exploring issues such as slimming centres and the Merlion.

Dim Sum Dollies performed in the Love Amplified concert, a concert held in Singapore to commemorate World AIDS Day 2008. The concert was held at Fort Canning Park, Singapore on 29 November 2008.

In 2010, they were appointed as ambassadors for gracious campaign by the Public Transport Council with support from the Singapore Kindness Movement. The theme called "Love Your Ride", similar to the earlier "A Happy Journey Starts Like That" by Phua Chu Kang 1 year ago in 2009. Several jingles were recorded for the campaign.

Yong died of stomach cancer at the age of 36 in May 2012. Fellow actress Janice Koh said: "We have lost a beautiful actress and one of our most talented performers and singers tonight. Rest in peace, my dear Emma. Miss you ..."

Denise Tan, a deejay from Gold 905, a radio station in Singapore, who had previously stood in for Yong in 2011 when Yong had a relapse from cancer, took over Yong's role in the Dollies in 2013. Tan eventually left the Dollies in 2016 to focus on her radio career. Jo Tan, who was previously part of the Dollies' public relations team, replaced Denise and performed as part of the Dollies in a Dream Academy's 2020 Crazy Christmas fun-raising concert, Keep the DREAM Alive.

== Cast ==
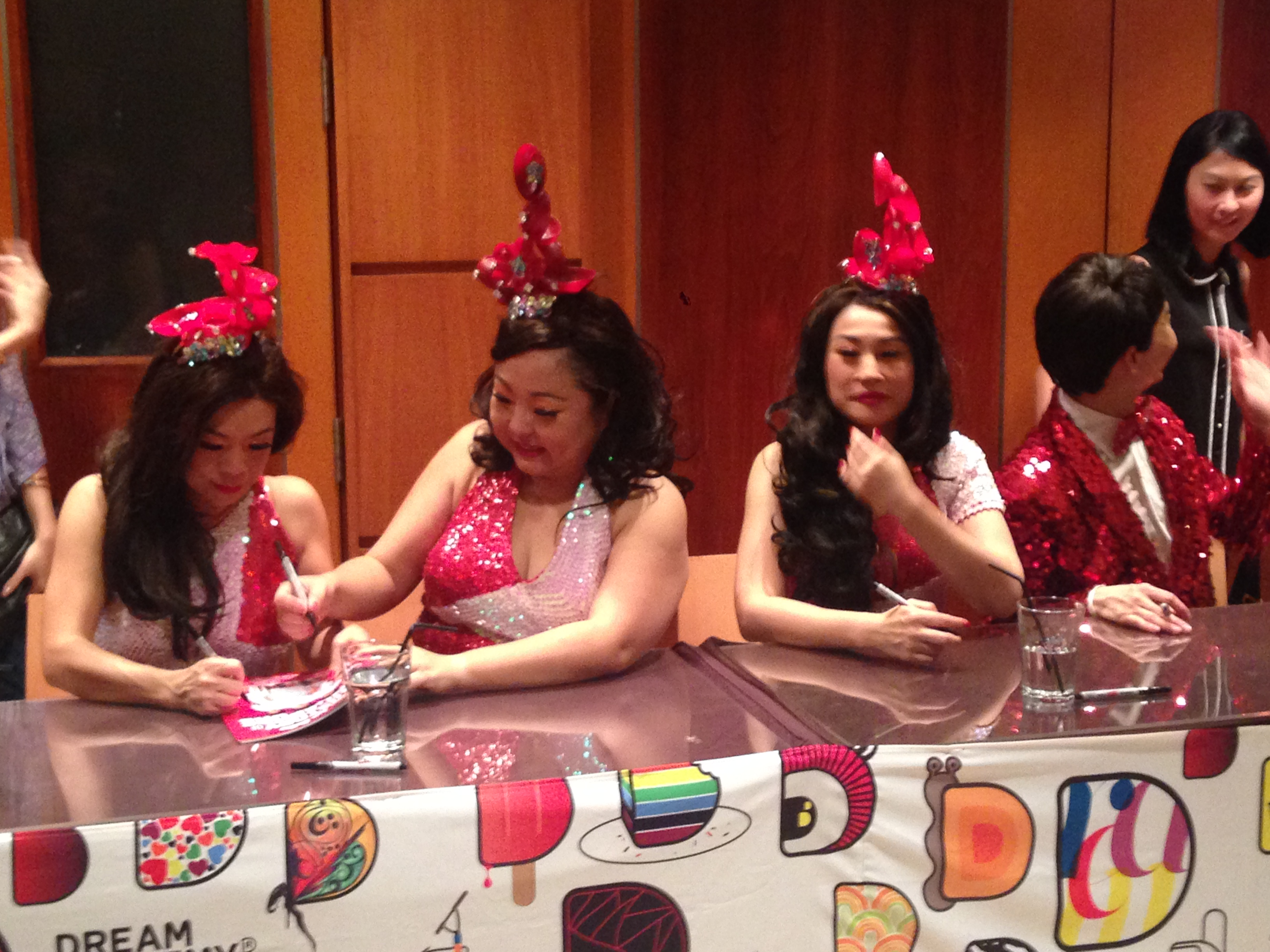
The Dim Sum Dollies signing autographs following their show Dim Sum Dollies: The History of Singapore Part 2 at the Esplanade – Theatres on the Bay, in December 2014. From left to right are Pamela Oei, Selena Tan and Denise Tan.

- Selena Tan has acted in productions such as Under One Roof (1999-2003), and also in popular local celebrity and film director Jack Neo movies such as I Not Stupid (2002), Homerun (2003), I Not Stupid Too (2006), Just Follow Law (2007) and I Not Stupid 3 (2024).
- Pam Oei has participated in several productions including Forever Fever (1998), Rent (2001), Boeing Boeing (2005), and Titoudao (2007).
- Emma Yong's most memorable works include Mammon Inc. (2002), Boeing Boeing (2005), Dick Lee's Man of Letters (2006), and Cabaret (2006).
- Denise Tan first replaced Yong in the 2011 edition of the Dim Sum Dollies.
- Jo Tan was announced as Denise Tan's replacement, first appearing in Dream Academy's 2020 Crazy Christmas fun-raising concert, entitled Keep the DREAM Alive.
- Hossan Leong has supported the Dim Sum Dollies in several of their productions, beginning with Most Wanted in 2005. In 2006, he played the leading role of Seymour in Little Shop of Horrors, in which the Dollies complemented the main cast, injecting a Singaporean element into the off-Broadway hit.
