= Libra Records =

Libra Records was a record label that well known Singaporean acts released their recordings on. One of its most well-known acts was the Western Union Band. The group had two no. 1 records on the label. Other acts to have their recordings released on the label were Kelsom, Glass Onion and The Sandboys.

== Background ==
The Sandboys were the first group to have a single released on the label with "Candle Light" bw "Turn Around". The band contained Hillary Francis was the lead singer and drummer. In late 1971, Billboard listed Garrison, Kelsom, No Sweat, Tenderness and Western Union Band as belonging to the label. The Western Union Band had "Something About You Baby" bw "Driving Me Crazy" released on Libra LRSP 009. By 18 March 1972, the song was at no.4 in the Malaysian Top 10. Before the year was out, the Western Union Band would have 2 no.1 hits. For the week ending 24 June, "Ive Found My Freedom" was at no.8 in Singapore, but it had hit the no.1 spot in Malaysia. And "Sausolito" was at no.1 in the Malaysian Top 10 by 26 August 1972. Family Robinson recorded the song "On the Ride (You Do It Once, You Do It Twice)" written by Lynsey de Paul and Ed Adamberry and it reached no.1 on the Malaysian singles chart on 9 February 1973.

The Glass Onion were a Singapore psych band who won the Bee Gees contest in Singapore. Their release on the label was "Purple Lady" backed with "It's Over".

== Catalogue ==
List of singles
Act	Title	Catalogue	Year	Notes
The Sandboys	"Candle Light" / "Turn Around"	Libra Records LRSP 001	1970	
Garrison	"From The City" / "Ain’t Gonna Cry"	Libra Records LRSP 002		
Kelsom	"Mr. Monday" / "I Will"	Libra Records LRSP 003		
Kelsom	"Free As The Wind" / "Something"	Libra Records LRSP 004		
Tenderness	"The Long And Winding Road" / "Marleypurt Drive"	Libra Records LRSP 005		
Garrisons	"Moving Out" / "I Can't Go On"	Libra Records LRSP 006		
X'Quisites	"The Life I Wanna Lead" / "Walking in Sunshine"	Libra Records LRSP 007		
Western Union Band	"My Lady" / "Stepping Thru an Empty Time"	Libra Records LRSP 008		
Western Union Band	"Something About You Baby" / "Driving Me Crazy"	Libra Records LRSP 009		
Western Union Band	"I've Found My Freedom" / "Don't Say You Don't"	Libra Records LRSP 010		
Western Union Band	" Sausolito" / "Showbiz"	Libra Records LRSP 011		
Glass Onion	"Purple Lady" / "It's Over"	Libra Records LRSP 012		
Family Robinson	"You Do It Once, You Do It Twice" / "We’re Free"	Libra Records LRSP 013	1972	
Family Robinson	"Tight Pants" / "Same Old Feeling"	Libra Records LRSP 014		
Family Robinson	"What I Mean" / "Carolina"	Libra Records LRSP 015		
?	"Yesterday's Sorrows" / "Four Corners of My Life"	Libra Records LRSP 016		

List of EPs
Act	Title	Catalogue	Year	Notes
Kelsom Hashim & Plastic Deers	A: "Akan Setia Pada Mu", "Rindu"; B: "Mengapa Tiada Maaf", "Pemuda Mudi Sekarang"	Libra LREP 001		
