= Tropicana (Singapore) =

Former mixed-use building in Singapore

General information
- Status: Demolished
- Location: 9 Scotts Road, Singapore
- Coordinates: 1.3065°N 103.8320°E
- Opened: 30 March 1968; 58 years ago
- Closed: 31 May 1989; 37 years ago
- Owner: Vermont Realty

Technical details
- Floor count: 4

Design and construction
- Architecture firm: Kee Yeap & Associates
- Developer: Shaw Sung Ching

Tropicana was a 4-storey mixed-use building at 9 Scotts Road in Singapore. It was developed by Shaw Sung Ching and opened in 1968. Tropicana was reportedly the country's first building to contain nightclubs, restaurants, and a theatre. In February 1989, the plot on which the building stood was purchased for S$70 million (equivalent to S$125.1 million in 2022). Tropicana officially ceased operation four months later; it was subsequently demolished and replaced by the 12-storey Pacific Plaza.

== History ==
=== Development ===
The Singapore Tourist Promotion Board (STPB) had envisaged building a nightclub-theatre complex since the mid-1960s. Together with architect Shaw Sung Ching, STPB began formulating plans to develop such a project in 1967.

Shaw later purchased the 25,000-square-foot (2,300 m^{2}) 9 Scotts Road (which housed the apartment complex that he lived in) through his company, Vermont Realty, and designated it as the site of his new project. Shaw settled on the name "Tropicana", which he thought evoked Singapore's tropical climate.

Construction of the 4-storey Tropicana began in April 1967. The building was designed by Kee Yeap & Associates, while the interior was designed by Will Fernandez & Associates. An August 1967 report by The Straits Times estimated that Tropicana would cost S$1.5 million (equivalent to S$6 million in 2022) to build and another million dollars to furnish.

=== Opening and later years ===
Tropicana opened on 30 March 1968 by STPB chairman, P. H. Meadows. It was reportedly the first entertainment complex in Singapore, if not all of Southeast Asia, to contain nightclubs, restaurants, and a theatre. The theatre of Tropicana was located on the first floor and typically hosted cabaret performers such as Les Doriss' Girls Revue from Paris. In 1971, American jazz musician Count Basie performed for one night at Tropicana; according to The Straits Times, the S$85 (equivalent to S$333.9 in 2022) tickets were "at the time the most costly for a performance in Singapore." Tropicana also housed several establishments for eating and drinking, including Le Bistro Bar, Orchard Lantern, Rasa Sayang, and a VIP lounge.

In February 1989, after some five months of negotiations with the Shaws, the site was purchased by the Hong-Kong based subsidiary of London and Edinburgh Trust, LET Pacific, for S$70 million (equivalent to S$125.1 million in 2022). Tropicana officially closed on 31 May 1989. It was demolished shortly after to make way for the 12-storey Pacific Plaza, which cost an additional S$65 million (equivalent to S$112.3 million in 2022) to construct and was completed in mid-1992.

== In popular culture ==
Tropicana, a musical produced by Tan Kheng Hua, chronicles the lives of several Tropicana employees in the 1960s. It premiered at Singapore's Capitol Theatre in April 2017.
