= The Quests =

Singaporean pop band (1961–1970)

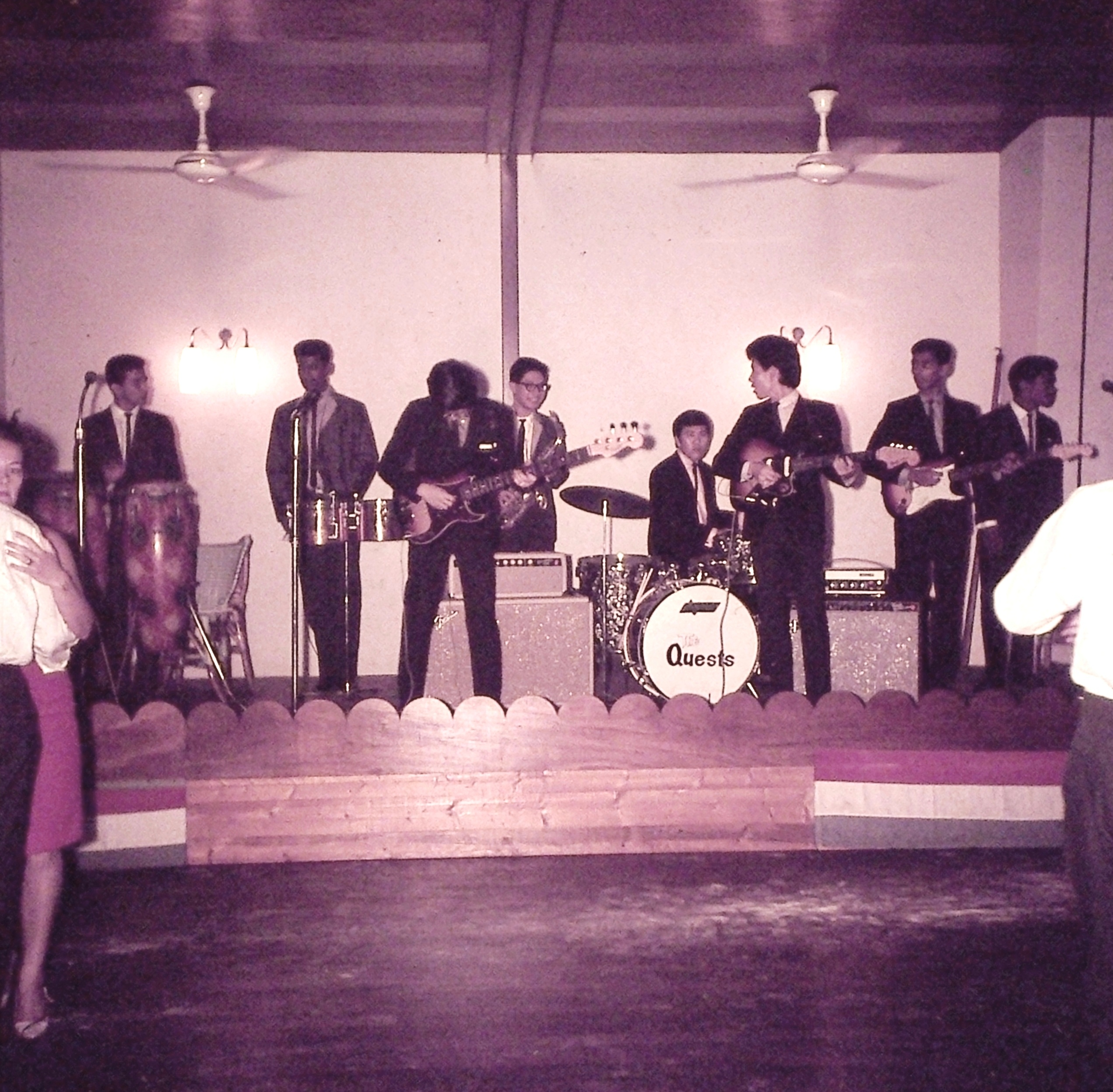
- The Quests performing in 1963

Background information
- Origin: Singapore
- Genres: Rock, pop
- Years active: 1961–1970
- Label: EMI
- Past members: Jap Chong; Raymond Leong; Henry Chua; Lim Wee Guan; Reggie Verghese; Siri Pereira; Wilson David; Keith Locke; Vernon Cornelius; Sam Toh; Jimmy Chan

The Quests was a Singaporean pop band. Founded in 1961 by guitarist Chong Chow Pin, lead guitarist Raymond Leong, bassist Henry Chua, and drummer Lim Wee Guan, they are considered the most successful Singapore band of the 1960s.

== History ==
=== Formation and early years ===
In 1960, Chong Chow Pin (referred to by his nickname "Jap"), Raymond Leong, Henry Chua, and Lim Wee Guan often listened to British music records featuring the electric guitar. Students of about 13 and 14 years old at the time, they were neighbours in the Tiong Bahru area. Inspired by music acts such as Cliff Richard and the Shadows, the four practised playing popular songs. While they did not have formal training in playing instruments or reading music, they acquired these skills through imitation and practice.

In 1961, the four formed The Quests, with Chong on lead vocals and rhythm guitar, Leong on lead guitar, Chua on bass guitar, and Lim on drums. The name of the band was derived from the school magazine of Queenstown Secondary Technical School (now Queenstown Secondary School), where Chong and Leong were students.

The Quests' first paid performance was at St Andrew's Mission in 1961. As they were just starting, they had to borrow instruments and equipment from friends and family. The band was paid $20 for the event.

In 1963, Reggie Verghese, then of The Checkmates, replaced Leong, who left the band to pursue an engineering career. With the addition of Siri Pereira as lead vocalist for a brief period, the band became known as Siri Pereira and The Quests. When Wilson David replaced Pereira, the band became known as Wilson David and The Quests. Due to David's reputation as the "Elvis Presley of Singapore", the band added several Elvis songs to their repertoire.

=== Height of popularity ===
By the mid-1960s, The Quests were one of the most popular bands in Singapore. The band was in great demand for regular stints at dance halls and nightclubs like the Golden Venus, stage performances at venues like the Capitol Theatre, Singapore Badminton Stadium, and on television programmes such as Dendang Ria and Pop Inn.

In 1964, The Quests, sans Wilson David, clinched a recording contract with recording label EMI, represented by Daisy Devan. At Devan's request, for their first release, the band produced two original compositions, "Shanty" and "Gallopin". "Shanty" became the first song by a local band to reach the top of the Singapore charts, displacing The Beatles' "I Should Have Known Better" at No. 1, where it stayed for 12 weeks. In the 1990s, the song was re-recorded by the Swedish group Invaders and the Dutch group Danny and the Electro Strings. These singles were followed by other similarly successful original compositions. Apart from their own records, The Quests also played for other EMI artists on their recordings.

By this time, the band was also famous in the region. In 1966, the band went overseas for the first time, on a tour of Malaysia with the Maori Hi-Five. This was followed by tours to countries such as Brunei and the Philippines.

In 1965, Keith Locke joined the band as lead vocalist for a brief but productive period. Reggie Verghese left the band to concentrate on his studies, but was eventually persuaded to return. When Locke returned to the UK in 1966, the band invited Vernon Cornelius to replace him. The band then released the album Questing, the first stereo album by a Singapore band.

In 1967, Sam Toh, then of The Blackjacks, replaced Chua, who left the band to pursue his studies in engineering. The following year, the band secured a contract to play at the Mocambo Club in Hong Kong, with the addition of Jimmy Chan on keyboards. It was a successful stint, but the hectic schedule took its toll, and Cornelius left the band in 1968 for health reasons.

After their return to Singapore in 1969, the band settled down to a regular stint at the Kelong Niteclub.

=== Disbanding ===
With a lineup that included only two original members, The Quests officially disbanded in 1970, and the band members pursued diverse paths. Chong moved to Los Angeles. Verghese became a music producer with EMI, then set up a sound studio, Boogie Productions. Lim and Chan continued working in the music business as session and lounge musicians. Cornelius had a varied career that included becoming a Rediffusion DJ and frontman for The Overheads. Chua headed an engineering company and wrote Call It Shanty: The Story of The Quests, a book about the band. The band reunited for charity concerts in 1982 and 1989, and in 1994 re-recorded a CD of their hits. They also appeared on Rolling Good Times, a popular 1990s television programme.

== Members ==
=== Past members ===
- Chong Chow Pin – rhythm guitar (1961–1970), lead vocals (1961–1963, 1968–1970) (died 2014)
- Raymond Leong – lead guitar (1961–1963)
- Henry Chua – bass guitar (1961–1967)
- Lim Wee Guan – drums (1961–1970)
- Reggie Verghese – lead guitar (1963–1970), lead vocals (1968–1970) (died 2015)
- Siri Pereira – lead vocals (1963)
- Wilson David – lead vocals (1963–1964)
- Keith Locke – lead vocals (1965–1966)
- Vernon Cornelius – lead vocals (1966–1968)
- Sam Toh – bass guitar (1967–1970)
- Jimmy Chan – keyboards (1968)

== Bibliography ==
- Chua, Henry (2001). Call it Shanty!: The Story of the Quests. Singapore: Options Publications. ISBN 981-04-4666-7. OCLC 48516943.
