= Wee Li Lin =

Singaporean film director

Wee Li Lin (born 1973) is a Singaporean director known for directing the feature films Gone Shopping and Forever, as well as several short films, such as Centrepoint KidZ.

== Early life and education ==
When she was young, she would "trawl" the video library or go to the cinemas by herself on weekends. She attended Brown University, where she majored in art semiotics. She is also a graduate of the New York University Tisch School of the Arts.

== Career ==
In 1997, Wee directed her first short film, Norman on the Air, for which she won the Best Director award at the 1997 Singapore International Film Festival Silver Screen awards. She directed the short film Another Guy, which won the Special Achievement Award at the Singapore International Film Festival in 1999. She directed her fifth short film, Holiday, which starred Adrian Pang, in 2002. She directed the short film All My Presents as a segment of Digital Compassion 02. She directed the short films Maths Tuition, Homemaker and Autograph Book in 2001, 2002 and 2003 respectively.

Wee directed her first feature film, Gone Shopping, in 2007. It competed at the Asia New Talent Section of the 2008 Shanghai International Film Festival, and was shown at the 2008 Asian American International Film Festival. Her second feature film was the 2011 romantic comedy film Forever. In 2012, Wee directed the short film Singapore Country as part of a commission by the National Library Board for the Singapore Memory Project. The film focuses on singer Matthew Tan and his hit song, Singapore Cowboy. She directed the telemovie Hong Baos and Kisses in 2014. Later that year, she directed the short film That Loving Feeling.

Wee directed the short films Centrepoint KidZ and My Autograph in 2015, the latter of which was an expansion of her 2003 short film, Autograph Book. She hoped that Centrepoint KidZ would help dispel negative stereotypes about Centrepoint Kids. Both films played at the National Library Board's Singapore Memory Project Rewind/Remind film festival. She directed the music video for We Are Singapore, the official National Day Parade song for 2018. In 2019, she directed the short film The Factory Girl as one of four short films on the Merdeka Generation package. Later that year, she directed the short film A Lifesaver's Passion as a segment of The Merdeka Stories II.

The Infocomm Media Development Authority describes her as one of the "pioneer female filmmakers in Singapore".

== Filmography ==
- Norman on the Air (1997)
- Another Guy (1999)
- Maths Tuition (2001)
- All My Presents (2002)
- Holiday (2002)
- Homemaker (2002)
- Autograph Book (2003)
- Gone Shopping (2007)
- Forever (2011)
- Singapore Country (2012)
- Hong Baos and Kisses (2014)
- That Loving Feeling (2014)
- Centrepoint KidZ (2015)
- My Autograph Book (2015)
- Baby Bumps (2016)
- The Perm (2016)
- Areola Borealis (2017)
- A Lifesaver's Passion (2019)
- Interwoven (2019)
- The Factory Girl (2019)
