= Tan Chay Wa's tombstone trial =

1983 legal judgement in Singapore

Coordinates: 1°22′50″N 103°41′42″E

Tan Chu Boon, the older brother of the Singaporean political dissident Tan Chay Wa, was arrested in 1983 and charged on suspicion that he had designed a subversive tombstone for Tan Chay Wa. The tombstone allegedly had engraved on it words glorifying the communist cause. The story of the ensuing court case was later taken up in London by The Sunday Times a few months after the trial, making the case an internationally known issue.

== History ==
The Malayan National Liberation Front (MNLF), an organisation of the Communist Party of Malaya (CPM), was formed in 1968 to support the overthrow of the governments of Singapore and Malaysia. The countries had been declared independent in 1965, but the communists rejected their separation. From 1968 to 1974, the armed struggle included planting booby trap bombs in public places. The MNLF was also involved in collecting supplies such as medicine, explosives and assorted equipment for the Malayan National Liberation Army (MNLA), which was the military arm of the CPM operating in the border area of northern Malaysia and southern Thailand.

In 1976, after a prolonged investigation, Singapore's Internal Security Department arrested hundreds of MNLF members together with many documents, arms and explosives in a sting operation in Singapore. Twenty-three members were released after interrogation, seventeen were detained without trial under the Internal Security Act (ISA) and ten turned over to the Malaysian police for suspected involvement in terrorist activities in Malaysia.

=== Tan Chay Wa ===
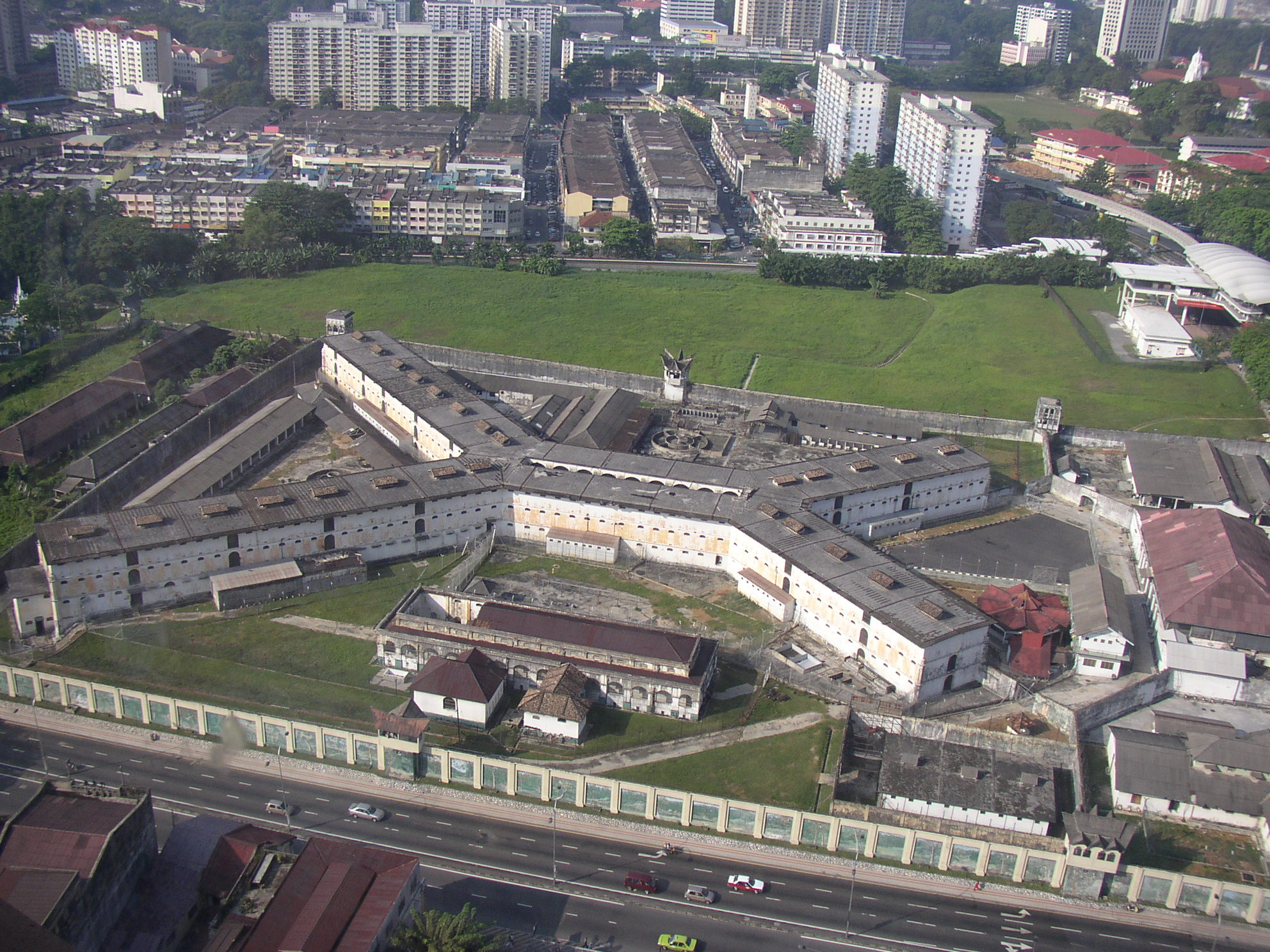
A bird's eye view of Pudu Prison in Malaysia

Tan Chay Wa (1948–1983), a political dissident and a senior official of the MNLF, managed to escape from Singapore to Malaysia as the ISD officers closed in on him. Chay Wa was a bus driver and a married man living in Singapore. On 2 June 1979, Chay Wa was arrested at a vegetable farm in Johor; he had a .32 Llama semi-automatic pistol and seven bullets in his possession. He was convicted under Malaysia's Essential Security Cases (Amendment) Regulations (ESCAR) by Johor Bahru's High Court, which provides for a mandatory death penalty. During his detention, there was an offer by the Government of Belgium to grant him political asylum should he be allowed to leave Malaysia. However, he was hanged on 18 January 1983 in Kuala Lumpur's Pudu Prison.

Chay Wa's body was brought back to Singapore by his older brother, Tan Chu Boon. Chu Boon arranged for his brother's body to be buried in Choa Chu Kang Cemetery on 20 January 1983. However, Chu Boon was arrested by the Criminal Investigation Department (CID) Secret Society Investigation Branch at his flat on 28 May 1983 on suspicion that he designed an elaborate but subversive tombstone, which had engraved on it words glorifying the communist cause.

=== 'Subversive' tombstone trial ===
At his November 1983 trial, Chu Boon argued in court that he was neither a communist nor did he have political leanings of any kind; he did not monitor or even read the proposed inscription handed to him on a piece of paper by his brother's widow, which was given to the tombstone inscriber. The inscription in Chinese, written in emotive language, read:

Martyr Tan Chay Wa came from a poor peasant family. In the seventies, he joined the Malayan National Liberation Front, an organisation led by the Communist Party of Malaya. He contributed all the money that he had managed to save to the organisation, thus manifesting amply the noble quality of a revolutionary warrior. He carried on his work in total disregard of his own personal safety. On 2 June 1979, he was arrested. While in prison, he was cruelly beaten up and subjected to coercive threats and inducement but he remained resolute and unflinchingly dauntless. In the cause of the liberation of the motherland, he was hanged in Pudu Prison in Kuala Lumpur on 18 January 1983 and died a heroic death. At the time of his death, he was only 35. A few moments before he died, he wrote a heroic poem which read:

With heart filled with righteous indignation,
I stand at the gallows and forcefully pen this poem with blood.
I want to air my grievances for a hundred years,
unable to tell all the wrongs with blood.
When will this gallows be destroyed to bring about a new heaven?

This militant poem depicts his deep hatred against the old society and his boundless confidence in the victory of the revolution of the motherland. His glorious image will forever live in the minds of the people.

The court then heard that the CID started investigating the tombstone on 11 May 1983 and had seized the original piece of paper from the tombstone-maker's shop in Choa Chu Kang. Chu Boon's defence lawyer was J.B. Jeyaretnam, a member of the Parliament of Singapore and also member of the Workers' Party. Jeyaretnam established that the instigation for the CID investigation and arrest had come from "a government department". In mitigation, Jeyaretnam made the point that, apart from immediate family and friends, the public would not have known about the 'subversive' tombstone nor its inscription in Singapore's biggest cemetery.

The court threw out Chu Boon's defence plea and he was convicted on grounds that he had "under his control, the tombstone of his brother, Tan Chay Wa, on which was engraved in Chinese characters an inscription which tended to advocate acts prejudicial to the security of Singapore." He was sentenced to a year in jail; on appeal this was reduced to a month.

=== Unintended publicity ===
The court case hearing of Chu Boon had one unintended consequence; it made Chay Wa much better known to the public than he may otherwise have been. As a result, the story was later taken up in London by The Sunday Times a few months after the trial, making the case internationally known and depicting the Singapore government in a hostile manner. Robust "don't interfere in our internal affairs" retorts soon emerged from government circles.

== Tombstone ==
Chay Wa's grave is in Choa Chu Kang Cemetery's Buddhist sector, grave number 3222, Block 8. In 1985, it was reported that the inscription of the tombstone had been whited out with plaster by members of Tan's own family who wished to avoid any glorification of Chay Wa's association with the communist cause. At that time, only a photograph of Chay Wa and some letterings showing his name and the years of his birth and death can be seen.

== Legacy ==
In his 1986 book The Tiger and the Trojan Horse, British author Dennis Bloodworth noted that "the ideograms in stone, chiselled by a sentient hand, were proof that this was the epitaph of a man, not a movement."

In January 2024, a Singaporean film Small Hours Of The Night dramatising the trial and fallout first premiered at the 53rd International Film Festival Rotterdam. The film was subsequently screened in several other film festivals. The film was submitted for classification by Singapore's Infocomm Media Development Authority (IMDA) for the 2024 Singapore International Film Festival (SGIFF). In November, the film was denied classification by IMDA, which is not approved for release in Singapore under any classification, which resulted it being unable to screen at the SGIFF.

== See also ==
- Chin Peng
- Chia Thye Poh
