= Sex.Violence.FamilyValues =

- Theatrical Release Poster
- Directed by: Ken Kwek
- Written by: Ken Kwek
- Produced by: Ken Kwek; The Butter Factory
- Starring: Matthew Loo; Serene Chen; Vadi PVSS; Adrian Pang; Pam Oei; Osman Sulaiman; Sylvia Ratonel; Tan Kheng Hua
- Distributed by: Cathay
- Release date: 5 October 2012 (Singapore premiere)
- Running time: 47 minutes
- Country: Singapore
- Language: English

Sex.Violence.FamilyValues is a 2012 film anthology by writer-director Ken Kwek.

Comprising three short stories, the film was shot over a two-year period at The Butter Factory, a downtown nightclub in Singapore, whose owners financed the project. The individual shorts were screened at more than a dozen international film festivals, and Porn Masala won the Audience Choice Award for Short Film at the 2011 Gotham Screen Film Festival in New York.

== Synopsis ==
Billed as "three dirty stories from the world's cleanest city", the film is described by its makers as "pitch[ing] political correctness out the window of Singapore mainstream cinema."

Cartoons is a dark comedy about a disturbed child whose kindergarten headmistress discovers the boy's penchant for drawing morbid cartoons.

Porn Masala is a satirical farce about a racist pornographer who casts an Indian actor in his movie after mistaking the latter for an African.

The Bouncer tells the story of nightclub bouncer whose life is upended when he encounters a rebellious teenage pole dancer.

== Controversy ==
In June 2012, Sex.Violence.FamilyValues was acquired by distributor Cathay Cinemas, making it the first short film to obtain a solo theatrical release in Singapore. However, a day after its premiere on 5 October 2012, Singapore's Media Development Authority (MDA) revoked the film's M18 classification and banned the film following complains from Indians who had viewed the trailer containing the racial content, alleging that Porn Masala contained scenes which were offensive to Singapore's Indian community.

The ban sparked a public furore in Singapore and abroad. Numerous film festivals where Porn Masala was screened defended the film and issued statements of protest against the ban. In Singapore, Members of Parliament questioned the MDA's late review in the state's legislature.

On 6 November 2012, the film's director and producers submitted an appeal to Singapore's government-appointed Films Appeal Committee, asking for the ban to be lifted.

On 11 January 2013, the Committee overturned the Board of Film Censors' decision and lifted the ban. However, it stopped short of reinstating the film's M18 classification, saying that some references in Porn Masala might still be construed as offensive to Singapore's Indian community. Instead, it announced that the film would be given an R21 rating subject to edits by the filmmaker.

The Singapore version of the film was completed and passed by the MDA in February 2013 and was released on 14 March. However, within a week of the release, the film was banned by the Film Censorship Board of Malaysia and withdrawn from the Asean International Film Festival & Awards, where it was due to be screened on 28 March.
