= Better Life (film) =

American science-fiction comedy film

- Directed by: Jessica Liu
- Written by: Jessica Liu
- Produced by: Annie Huang; Samantha Gao
- Starring: Jim Lau; Valerie Loo; Randall Park; Ming-Na Wen; Joel Kim Booster; Margaret Cho; Anirudh Pisharody; Yao
- Cinematography: Jon Keng; Mary Ma
- Edited by: Tiffany Lin
- Music by: Tangelene Bolton
- Country: United States
- Language: English

Better Life is an upcoming American independent satirical science fiction dark comedy film written and directed by Jessica Liu in her feature length debut. The cast includes Jim Lau, Valerie Loo, Randall Park, Ming-Na Wen, Joel Kim Booster, Margaret Cho and Yao.

== Premise ==
A father hopes to help his unemployed daughter have a better life through a new medical procedure.

== Cast ==
- Jim Lau
- Valerie Loo
- Randall Park
- Ming-Na Wen
- Joel Kim Booster
- Margaret Cho
- Anirudh Pisharody
- Yao
- Fivel Stewart
- Kelly McCormack
- Christine Ko
- Tim Chiou
- Sophia Xu
- Rodney J. Hobbs
- Mel Mehrabian
- Cassandra Blair
- Chris Cortez
- Lacey Claire Rogers
- Homie Doroodian
- Nick Rutherford

== Production ==
The film is written and directed by Jessica Liu in her feature length debut, and follows her short film of the same name. It is produced by Annie Huang and Samantha Gao.

The cast is led by Jim Lau, Valerie Loo, Randall Park, Ming-Na Wen, Joel Kim Booster, Margaret Cho, Anirudh Pisharody and Yao. The cast also includes Fivel Stewart, Kelly McCormack, Christine Ko and Tim Chiou, with Sophia Xu, Rodney J. Hobbs, Mel Mehrabian, Cassandra Blair, Chris Cortez, Lacey Claire Rogers, Homie Doroodian, and Nick Rutherford.

Principal photography took place in Los Angeles in September 2025 and was completed by the following month.
