= Seksis =

Studio album by Anita Sarawak
- Released: 24 February 2004
- Recorded: 2003
- Genre: Pop
- Length: 39:00
- Label: RadioAktive / KRU Music Group
- Producer: Edry Abdul Halim

Anita Sarawak chronology
Antara Yang Manis (1992)	Seksis (2004)	Another Dimension (2005)

Singles from Seksis
- 1. "Seksis" Released: 2004; 2. "Juara Carta" Released: 2004

Seksis is the nineteenth studio album by Singaporean singer Anita Sarawak. It was released on 24 February 2004 by RadioAktive (KRU Music Group).

== Production ==
After 16 years in the United States, Anita Sarawak returned to Singapore in August 2001 and began performing more frequently in Singapore and Malaysia. In 2003, she signed with RadioAktive, a music label under the KRU Music Group, and began working on a new album.

Seksis was his first studio album in 13 years, following Antara Yang Manis (1992). The album was produced by Edry Abdul Halim, who also wrote five of the ten tracks. The title track, "Seksis," focuses on strength, self-respect, and women's empowerment.The album also aiming to connect Anita Sarawak with a younger audience.

== Track listing ==
No.	Title	Writer(s)	Length
1.	"Diva"	Edry Abdul Halim	4:07
2.	"Seksis"	Edry Abdul Halim	3:47
3.	"Hingga Akhir Masa"	Archie, Nine	3:33
4.	"Mati Takkan Hidup Semula"	Edry Abdul Halim	4:10
5.	"Juara Carta"	Edry Abdul Halim	4:03
6.	"Pernahkah Aku"	Archie, Nine	3:43
7.	"Silakan Bermimpi"	Archie, Nine	4:00
8.	"Di Sinilah Syurga"	Edry Abdul Halim	4:00
9.	"Enakkan Tidur Malamku"	Neves (Pretty Ugly)	4:00
10.	"Akhirnya Kini Pasti"	Mazlan Hamzah, Johan Nawawi	4:17
Total length:			39:00

== Release and reception ==
Seksis was released on 24 February 2004, with the title track serving as the lead single. A music video directed by Yusry Abdul Halim, featuring Anita Sarawak and her husband, was produced to promote the single.

Shortly after the album's release, the Malaysian Communications and Multimedia Commission (MCMC) banned government and private radio stations from playing "Seksis" and "Diva," citing improper mixing of Malay and English in the lyrics. The ban on private stations was later lifted under provided guidelines.

A review in Berita Harian praised Anita Sarawak's commanding presence, stating: "Who else can deliver ‘Seksis’ as powerfully as Anita?"

== Personnel ==
- Anita Sarawak – vocals
- Edry Abdul Halim – producer, composer
- Norman Abdul Halim - executive producer
- Archie – composer
- Nine – composer
- Neves (Pretty Ugly) – composer
- Mazlan Hamzah – composer
- Johan Nawawi – composer
- Yusry Abdul Halim – music video director

== Release history ==
Region	Release date	Format	Label
Malaysia	24 February 2004	CD, Digital download	RadioAktive / KRU Music Group
