= Love Amplified =

2008 Singapore concert

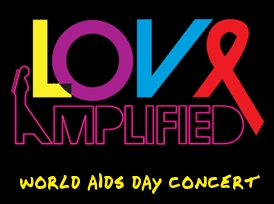
The logo for Love Amplified, World AIDS Day 2008 Concert.

The Love Amplified Concert was a concert held in Singapore at Fort Canning Park on 29 November 2008 to commemorate World AIDS Day 2008. It was titled LOVE Amplified (Love Amp in short), and was organised by the Health Promotion Board bringing together Singapore talents including the likes of Stefanie Sun, Hady Mirza, Hossan Leong and Dim Sum Dollies.

== See also ==
- By My Side (TV series)
