= Small Hours of the Night =

2024 Singaporean political documentary drama film directed by Daniel Hui

- Directed by: Daniel Hui
- Written by: Daniel Hui
- Produced by: Bee Thiam Tan
- Starring: Irfan Kasban; Yang Yanxuan Vicki
- Release date: 2024
- Country: Singapore

Small Hours of the Night is a 2024 Singaporean political documentary drama film directed by Daniel Hui. The film is inspired from the real life incidents which were unfolded during the infamous court case that was held in 1983, popularly known as the Tan Chay Wa's tombstone trial. The film had its world premiere in the Harbour section of the 2024 International Film Festival Rotterdam. The film was supposed to have its Singapore premiere at the 2024 Singapore International Film Festival, but the film was banned from having its premiere in the Undercurrents section of the festival.

== Cast ==
- Yang Yanxuan Vicki
- Irfan Kasban

== Theme ==
The film explores the scandal where the brother of infamous armed activist Tan Chay Wa was accused of being a treason and faced a prison sentence for his attempts on reciting a revolutionary poem to be inscribed on the grave of Tan Chay Wa. The film delves further into how Tan Chay Wa's brother is scrutinized for his course of action in fulfilling his brother's last wishes to have a poem inscribed on his grave as a traditional mark of respect for him, but his act was denounced as being perceived as betrayal to the law and prejudicial to the national security policies of Singapore.

== Production ==
The film was produced in a joint collaboration among 13 Little Pictures, Purin Pictures and White Light Studios. The film script was first presented as a project at FIDLab 2016 and was later submitted at the Berlinale Talents Doc Station 2017. The filmmakers also obtained funding from the Tan Ean Kiam Foundation under the purview of SGIFF Southeast Asian Documentary Grant in 2020.

== Censorship ==
The film was denied permission by the Singapore's state authorities to have its release in Singapore due to censorship issues. The authorities refused to issue a release certificate due to the controversial political elements being depicted in the film. Infocomm Media Development Authority had an in-depth discussion and panel review with Singapore's Ministry of Law and the Attorney-General's Chambers to assess the content of the film. InfoComm Media Development Authority revealed that the storyline of the film was subsequently deemed prejudicial to the national interests, which made it a logistical hurdle to be approved as a legitimate film for its screening at the Singapore International Film Festival.

However, the organisers of the Singapore International Film Festival, issued a statement that it would give honorable mentions and credit to the filmmakers by including the film as SGIFF's official selection.

== Release ==
The film had its North American premiere at 2024 Doc Fortnight MoMA. The film was premiered as an Asian premiere at the 2024 Taipei Film Festival. It was also screened as part of the Experimenta Strand at the BFI London Film Festival. The film was also officially selected for premiere at the 2024 São Paulo International Film Festival.

It will be screened in the revamped section Crosscut Asia+ of 39th Tokyo International Film Festival in late October 2026.
