= Tan Kheng Hua =

Singaporean actress (born 1963)

- Born: 17 January 1963 (age 63); Singapore
- Education: Indiana University School of Public and Environmental Affairs
- Occupation: Actress
- Spouse: Lim Yu-Beng (m. 1992; div. 2017)
- Partner: Kendell Dickinson
- Children: 1

Chinese name
- Traditional Chinese: 陳瓊華
- Simplified Chinese: 陈琼华
- Hanyu Pinyin: Chén Qiónghuá
- Hokkien POJ: Tân Khêng-hôa

Tan Kheng Hua (born 17 January 1963) is a Singaporean actress. She is best known for her supporting roles in the 2018 Hollywood film Crazy Rich Asians and in American television network the CW's martial arts television series Kung Fu (2021–2023).

== Early life and education ==
Tan acquired an interest in acting when she took a theatre elective while attending Indiana University. She graduated with a Bachelor of Science (magna cum laude) from Indiana University School of Public and Environmental Affairs. After returning to Singapore, she took up a job in public affairs, and pursued acting in her spare time.

== Career ==
The first stage play Tan performed in was John Bowen's The Waiting Room, which was directed by her cousin Ivan Heng. It took almost a decade before Tan became a full-time actress. In the theatre, Tan is in the original casts of landmark plays such as Beauty World, Lao Jiu, Descendants of the Admiral Eunuch, Animal Farm, Cooling Off Day and Falling, for which she won her second Life! Theatre Best Actress Award.

In Singaporean television, Tan is best known for her role as Margaret in Singapore's longest running and most successful sitcom, Phua Chu Kang Pte Ltd, for which she won an Asian Television Award for Best Actress (Comedy). Her first foray into Mandarin-language television, Beautiful Connection, earned her a Best Supporting Actress nomination at the Star Awards.

On the international scene, Tan has appeared in Serangoon Road, Marco Polo and Crazy Rich Asians.

In 2018, Tan signed with Conway van Gelder Grant in Britain and GVA Talent Agency and Zero Gravity Management in Los Angeles, United States. Tan was still signed with Fly Entertainment for the Asian region.

In 2020, Tan was cast as a series regular in Kung Fu, The CW's modern reboot of Kung Fu.

Tan also creates and produces for stage and television in Singapore including the critically acclaimed cabaret act, The Dim Sum Dollies; the dramas 9 Lives and Do Not Disturb, the latter being the first local TV series to receive the maximum 5-star rating from Straits Times Life!, the Mandarin serial, Mr & Mrs Kok and lifestyle infotainment on The Asian Food Channel. Outside of Singapore Tan produced No.7, an original theatre piece commissioned by the Georgetown Festival 2011 in Penang. No.7 was sold out with a waiting list. In 2014, she brought 64 Singaporean and Malaysian artists together in The SIN-PEN Colony to Penang's Georgetown Festival celebrating the cities’ shared heritage of food, visual art, music, theatre and design. The theatre segment within The SIN-PEN Colony, 2 Houses, sold-out within four days. She conceptualized and produced The Twenty-Something Theatre Festival 2016 and Tropicana The Musical (based on the real-life Tropicana entertainment complex) which opened to positive reviews in April 2017.

For her contributions to the arts, Tan was one of fifty local stage personalities in an exhibition celebrating 50 years of Singapore theatre and part of twenty contemporary artists chosen to represent Singapore in Singapore: Inside Out, a showcase presented by the Singapore Tourism Board in Beijing, London and New York City to celebrate Singapore's fiftieth anniversary.

== Personal life ==
Tan married Singaporean theatre and television actor Lim Yu-Beng in 1992. They divorced in 2017 after 25 years of marriage. They have a daughter, actress Lim Shi-an.

Tan has been in a relationship with Kendell Dickinson since January 2022.

== Filmography ==
=== Film ===
Year	Title	Role	Notes	Ref.
1996	Army Daze	Cavewoman		
1999	That One No Enough			
2005	Cages	Ali Tan		
2009	The Blue Mansion	Veronica Wee		
2012	Sex.Violence.FamilyValues			
2016	The Faith of Anna Waters	Charlotte Sharma		
2018	Crazy Rich Asians	Kerry Chu		
2019	The Garden of Evening Mists	Emily		
2024	The Tiger's Apprentice	Mrs. Diane Lee		
2025	Worth The Wait	Mary		
2026	A Singapore Dementia Story (Another Go)	Georgia Lim		

=== Television ===
Year	Title	Role	Notes	Ref
1996	Triple Nine	Chong Swee Chin		
1995	Dick Lee with the Singapore Symphony Orchestra	Herself, as host	variety show	
1997–2007	Phua Chu Kang Pte Ltd	Margaret Phua	8 seasons	
1999	AlterAsians – Iris’ Rice Bowl	Iris	Miniseries	
2001	A War Diary	Lim Swee Neo		
2002	Beautiful Connection	Mo Lan Ying		
2003	The New Home			
2008–2009	Sayang Sayang	Nellie Tan	2 seasons	
2013	Serangoon Road	Artik	Episode: "Reach Out"	
2014	Marco Polo	Xie Daoqing	8 episodes	
2015	The Pupil Season 2	Shirley Woo		
2017	BRA	Gloria Yap	2 episodes	
2019	Chimerica			
2020	Grey's Anatomy	Vera Roberts	Episode: "Sing It Again"	
2020	Medical Police	Bao Tsai	Episode: "Everybody Panic!"	
2020	Magnum P.I.	Lynn Yang	Episode: "The Night Has Eyes"	
2021–2023	Kung Fu	Mei-Li Chen	39 episodes	

== Theatre ==
- Practice Performing Arts: The Caucasian Chalk Circle by Bertold Brecht (ensemble, 1989)
- Mad Forest by Caryl Churchill (Lucia, Dog, 1990)
- TheatreWorks: Trojan Women by Euripides (Andromeda, 1991)
- Lao Jiu by Kuo Pao Kun (ensemble, Perth Festival 1994)
- Music & Movement: Kampong Amber by Catherine Lim (May, lead, opening show Singapore Arts Festival 1994)
- Longing (ensemble, outdoor performance) (1994)
- Broken Birds (ensemble, outdoor performance, 1995)
- Theatreworks: Descendants of the Admiral Eunuch by Kuo Pao Kun (ensemble, winner Critics Award Best Acting Ensemble Cairo International Festival for Experimental Theatre, 1996)
- TheatreWorks: Beauty World (Lulu, lead, South East Asian Theatre Festival and Tokyo International Theatre Festival in Japan) (1998)
- Fiction Farm: The Blue Room by David Hare (Au Pair, Model, 1999)
- Toy Factory: Guys & Dolls by Damon Runyon (Sarah Brown, 1999)
- Closer by Patrick Marber (Anna, 2000)
- Action Theatre: Autumn Tomyam by Desmond Sim (Marge Lerner, 2001)
- Mergers & Accusations by Eleanor Wong (Ellen Toh; 1993, 2001)
- Wills & Secession by Eleanor Wong (Ellen Toh; 1995, 2001)
- Wild Rice: Animal Farm adapted by Ian Wooldridge (Clover, 2002)
- Invitation To Treat – The Eleanor Wong Trilogy by Eleanor Wong (2003)
- Luna-Id: The Lover by Harold Pinter (Sarah, 2004)

== Awards and nominations ==
- National Colours Awards for Gymnastics (1977) (Noteworthy Selections: 21 Remarkable Women of *Singapore by the Association of Women for Action and Research (Aware))
- Indiana University Founders Day Award for High Scholastic Achievement (1984, 1985, 1986)
- Critics Choice for Best Actor Cairo International Festival of Experimental Theatre (1997)
- JCCI Singapore Foundation Culture Awards for Contributions to Singapore (1998)
- Asian Television Award Runner-up Best Current Affairs & Magazine Presenter (2000)
- DBS Life! Theatre Award, Best Actress (2002)
- Asian Television Award, Best Comedic Performance by an Actress (2002)
- Star Awards (Mandarin) Nominated Best Supporting Actress (2002)
- Asian Television Award Highly Commended Performance by an Actress (2003)
- Art Nation Best Actress Award (2003)
