= Singapore Cowboy =

Song
- Written: Matthew L.K. Tan - Bristow, Hopper
- Released: 1978
- Label: EMI
- Producer(s): Reggie Verghese

"Singapore Cowboy" is a song by Singaporean country band Matthew and the Mandarins, released in 1978.

== Background ==
Following Matthew Tan's move to Nashville, Tennessee in 1975, he composed "Singapore Cowboy" there. He returned to Singapore in 1977. Now home, Tan recorded the song.

Years later, in 2004, Tan received an Asia-Pacific Lifetime Achievement Award at the Canberra Country Blues & Roots Festival for the song which had sold in excess of 30,000 copies.

The song is included on the various artists compilation Recollecting Singapore 60's which was released on EMI. Their other hit "Let's Put the Sing in Singapore" also appears on the compilation.
