= Western Union Band =

Singaporean pop band

- Origin: Singapore
- Genres: Pop, Rock
- Years active: 1971 - 1980
- Labels: Libra, EMI
- Spinoff of: Rubber Band
- Past members: Benji; Tony Chong; Abel Gan; Rennie Ho; Danny Lim; Peter Mangkok; Shediq Marican (aka Ziani Shedick); Chris Vadham; Daniel Wee

Western Union Band was a band from Singapore in the 1970s. They had major hits in Singapore and Malaysia with "Driving Me Crazy", "I've Found My Freedom" and "Sausalito".

== Background ==
The band was a made of men from Indian, Chinese and Malay origin. They played regularly at the Moonshine bar in Katong. The group evolved out of Rubber Band which was formed in 1969 by Chris Vadham. Vadham had previously been in a band called High Ground. Bass player Tony Chong was founding member of the early 60s band The Thunderbirds, whose biggest hit was in 1966 with "My Lonely Heart".

== Career ==
Before the year of 1971 was out, the group had released the singles, "My Lady" bw "Stepping Thru" and "Something About You" bw "Driving Me Crazy". Both of them were on the Libra Records label.

=== Hits ===
For the week ending February 19th, 1972, their song "Baby, Driving Me Crazy" was at no.6 in the Malaysian Top 10. A month later, for the week ending March 18th, the song was at no.4. For the week ending April 8th, Billboard had recorded "Something About You Baby" at no.7.

In May, on the 27th, they were in the Singapore top 10 at no.9 with "Ive Found My Freedom". The following week, the song was also in the Singapore Top 10 at no.8. For the week ending June 24th, the song was at no.8 in Singapore, but it had hit the no.1 spot in Malaysia.

Their song Sausalito was at no.1 in the Malaysian Top 10 by August 26, 1972.

== Members ==
- Rennie Ho ... vocals
- Chris Vadham ... guitar, vocals
- Abel Gan ... keyboards
- Tony Chong ... bass
- Shediq Marican (aka Ziani Shedick) ... drums
- Danny Lim ... guitar, flute
- Peter Mangkok ... bass
- Daniel Wee ... drums
- Benji ... vocals

== Discography ==
Singles
Title	Release info	Year	Notes
"My Lady" / "Stepping Thru An Empty Time"	Libra LRSP 008	1971	
"Something About You Baby" / "Driving Me Crazy"	Libra LRSP 009	1971	
"I've Found My Freedom" / "Don't Say You Don't"	Libra LRSP 010		
"Sausolito" / "Showbiz"	Libra LRSP 011		
"Walkin' Proud" / Instrumental	Levi's LEVI'S-1	1975	

Albums
Title	Release info	Year	F	Notes
Western Union Band	EMI EMGS 5010	1977	LP	
We've Got Love	EMI EMGS 6038	1978	LP	
Western Union Band	EMI 7243 8 53398 2 0	1996	CD	

== Later years ==
Chris Vadham died in Watford, England on February 26, 2007 from liver cancer.

In 2014 Tony Chong was in a band called Tru-Blu, whose members included Gerry and Michael Pereira who had been in The Mccoys and Duncan Anthony who has been with Tin Pan Alley, Rusty Blades and New Breed.
