= Selena Tan =

Singaporean executive producer, director, writer and actress (born 1971)

- Tan in 2026
- Born: 29 July 1971 (age 55); Singapore
- Other name: Chen Meilin
- Education: Fairfield Methodist Secondary School; Raffles Junior College
- Alma mater: National University of Singapore
- Occupations: Executive producer; director; writer; actress; businesswoman; former lawyer
- Agent: Dream Academy (founder)
- Spouse: John Pok (m. 2005)
- Children: 1
- Parent(s): Charles Tan (father); Daisy Lim (mother)
- Musical career
- Member of: Dim Sum Dollies

Chinese name
- Traditional Chinese: 陳美廩
- Simplified Chinese: 陈美廪
- Hanyu Pinyin: Chén Měilǐn

Selena Tan (born 29 July 1971) is a Singaporean executive producer, director, writer, actress, businesswoman and former lawyer. She is best known as one of the cabaret trio, the Dim Sum Dollies. In 2000, Selena founded Dream Academy, which produced a variety of performance shows.

== Early life ==
Tan was born in 1971 in Singapore, to army officer Lieutenant Colonel Charles Tan, of the Singapore Armed Forces, and gold broker Daisy Lim. As the eldest of her siblings, she had two brothers and two sisters. She studied at Fairfield Methodist Secondary School, Raffles Junior College and graduated with a law degree from National University of Singapore.

She started acting at age 14 and was taught by the late theatre actress and director Christina Sergeant.

Tan also appeared in school productions and community theatre pieces until her undergraduate years. She also acted in plays and performances while working full-time as a general litigation lawyer.

== Career ==
Tan left the legal profession in 1997 to fully immerse herself full-time in the local arts and entertainment scene.

In 1998, Tan staged her own standup with Selena Exposed! Theatre company Action Theatre subsequently restaged Selena Exposed! for its comedy festival in 1999 and reinterpreted her piece as Broadway Baby Kailan. Dr Low Guat Tin, then a teacher-trainer director with the National Institute of Education (NIE), was so impressed with Selena's performance in Broadway Baby Kailan that she invited Selena to stage a show for Teachers' Day – The Other Side of the Teacher's Table. The three-night show enjoyed mild success.

In 2000, Tan utilised her life savings to set up Dream Academy, an independent arts and entertainment company. Dream Academy has since produced the Crazy Christmas series, Happy Ever Laughter, Broadway Beng, Meenah and Cheenah, The Hossan Leong Show, Kumar's standup comedies at the Esplanade and later the Dim Sum Dollies in 2002.

In 2011, Tan opened a restaurant known as Daisy's Dream Kitchen, showcasing her mother Daisy Lin's Peranakan Cuisine in Singapore. It is currently located at the Tamasek Club. In 2022, Tan set up an affiliated stall known as Daisy's Dream at Urban Hawker in New York City, a hawker center that sells Singapore-themed dishes. She manages the restaurant and stall along with her mother and brother, Roy.

== Personal life ==
Tan has been married to lawyer John Pok since 2005. They have one son.

== Filmography ==
=== Film and television ===
- Rogue Trader (1999)
- Under One Roof (1999-2003)
- I Not Stupid (2002)
- Homerun (2003)
- Daddy's Girls (2004-2005)
- I Not Stupid Too (2006)
- Just Follow Law (2007)
- Gone Shopping (2007)
- Rojak (2016)
- Crazy Rich Asians (2018)
- Shotgun Wedding (2022)
- I Not Stupid 3 (2024)
- Up Against It (2026)

== Theatre ==
- Godspell (1993)
- Into The Woods (Singapore Repertory Theatre) (1994)
- Ang Tau Mui (1995)
- Sing to the Dawn (1996)
- Chang and Eng (Action Theatre) (1997)
- Kumar: A Life Alive (1997)
- Selena Exposed! (1998)
- Ah Kong's Birthday Party (1998)
- Broadway Baby Kailan (1998)
- Kumar: A Life Alive (1998)
- The 2nd Broadway Baby Kailan (1999)
- The Other Side of the Teacher's Table (1999)
- Medicares (2000)
- PS21 + Positive Signs (2000)
- Maybe Knot (2000)
- Cabaret: A Single Woman (2002)
- Animal Farm (2002)
- Pillow Talk (2002)
- Dim Sum Dollies® in Steaming! (2003)
- Animal Farm (2003)
- The Revenge of the Dim Sum Dollies®! (2004)
- Chang and Eng (2004)
- Wanton Me (2004)
- Animal Farm (2004)
- Aladdin (2004)
- It Takes Two (2005)
- Dim Sum Dollies®! Singapore's Most Wanted (2005)
- The Snow Queen (2005)
- A Twist of Fate (2005)
- The Little Shop of Horrors (2006)
- Broadway Beng®! (2006)
- A Crazy Christmas (2007)
- Kumar The Queen (2007)
- Broadway Beng® Returns (2007)
- Dim Sum Dollies®: The History of Singapore (2007)
- Selena Tan: One Singular Sensation (2008)
- Dim Sum Dollies®: History of Singapore (Re-run) (2008)
- Broadway Beng®: You can't keep a good Beng down! (2008)
- Another Crazy Christmas (2008)
- Sing Dollar! The Musical Comedy About Money (2009)
- The Jungle Book (2009)
- Kumar: Stripped Bare & Standing up (2009)
- The Hossan Leong Show (2009)
- Broadway Beng®: Jiak Liu Lian! (2009)
- Crazy Christmas® (2010)
- The Hossan Leong Show 2010 (Episode 2) (2010)
- Cinderel-lah (2010)
- Kumar: Stripped Bare & Standing up (2010)
- Aladdin (2011)
- Into The Woods (2011)
- Kumar’s Amazing Race (2011)
- The Hossan Leong Show 2011 (Episode 3) (2011)
- Crazy Christmas® (2011)
- Kumar’s Amazing Race (2011)
- Happy Ever Laughter® (2012)
- Kumar’s Amazing Race (2012)
- Pillow Talk (2012)
- Kumar’s Amazing Race (2012)
- Crazy Christmas® (2012)
- The Hossan Leong Show 2012 - Flying Solo (2012)
- Crazy Christmas® Ting Tong Belles! (2013)
- Broadway Beng®! Benging you back to basics (2013)
- Kumar: What makes a man a man? (2013)
- Dim Sum Dollies® - The History of Singapore Part 2 (2014)
- Kumar: What makes a man a man? (2014)
- Happy Ever Laughter® - Standup Comedy Madness! (2014)
- Dim Sum Dollies® - The History of Singapore Part 1 (2015)
- Crazy Christmas® A Groundnutcracker (2015)
- Report Cuts (2015)
- Broadway Beng: 10th Anniversary Concert (2016)
- Meenah and Cheenah (2016)
- Detention Katong (2017)
- Charlie and Chocolate Factory (2017)
- Blithe Spirit (2017)
- Haunted (2017)
- Army Daze (2017)
- Company (2018)
- Blithe Spirit (2018)
- Nunsense (2018)
- Animal Farm (2018)
- Meenah and Cheenah (Rerun) (2019)
- BALLS! (2019)
- Love Calls (2020)
- Broadway Beng Last being standing (2021)
