= Canberra Country Blues & Roots Festival =

Annual music festival in Australia

- Genre: Country music
- Location: Canberra
- Years active: 2009–2019, 2021–
- Website: canberracountry.com

The Canberra Country Blues & Roots Festival, originally established as the Canberra Country Music Festival, is a 3-day event held annually in November with a focus on all subgenres of country music, dance and workshops. The event has been held in various locations around Canberra including Tuggeranong Homestead, Exhibition Park in Canberra, and the Hall Showgrounds.

This festival went on hiatus in 2020.

== Highlights ==
The festival has a reputation for giving national and international exposure to Australian Indigenous country music performers. The festival is also the home of the Canberra Country Music Awards, Canberra Country Songwriting Awards, Country's Got Talent competition and Canberra Ute Car + Truck Muster. The latter event has been unique in featuring Top Gear's Arctic Explorer Hi Lux vehicles as well as the first electric and hybrid awards for utes and trucks in Australia.

== See also ==
- List of country music festivals
- List of folk festivals
- List of bluegrass music festivals
- Country music
