= Ken Kwek =

Singaporean filmmaker (born 1979)

- 郭智軒
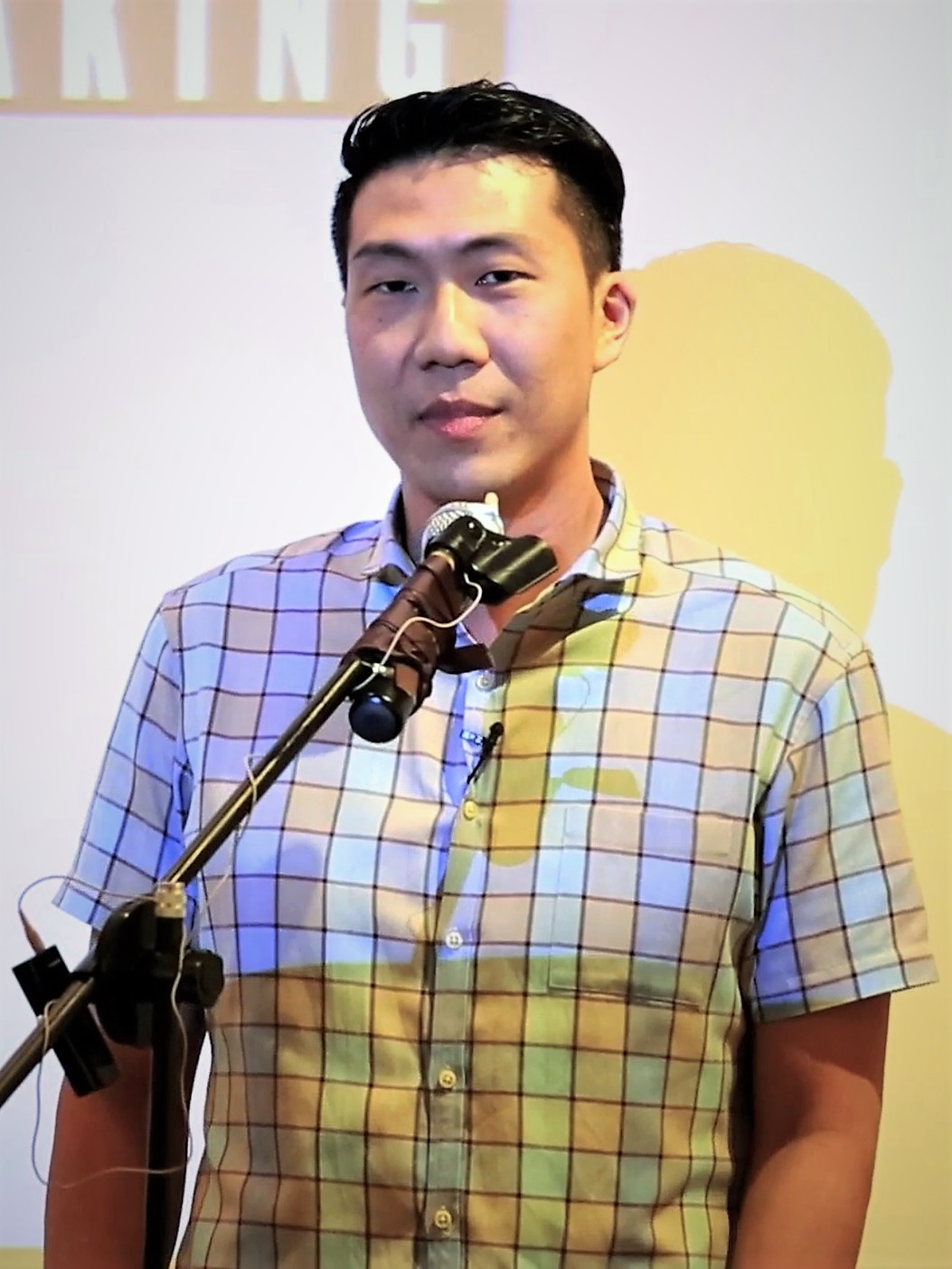
- Kwek speaks at "Telling Stories Live" in 2015
- Born: 7 May 1979 (age 47); Singapore
- Education: University of Cambridge; New York University
- Occupations: Screenwriter; director; playwright; author
- Spouse: Pam Oei
- Children: 1

Chinese name
- Traditional Chinese: 郭智軒
- Simplified Chinese: 郭智轩
- Hanyu Pinyin: Guō Zhìxuān

Ken Kwek (born 7 May 1979) is a Singaporean screenwriter, director, playwright and author. His short film compendium, Sex.Violence.FamilyValues, was banned by the Singapore and Malaysian governments in 2012. His first feature film Unlucky Plaza premiered at the Toronto International Film Festival in 2014. His second feature #LookAtMe premiered at the New York Asian Film Festival in 2022, to critical acclaim. He has written several full-length plays, including the #MeToo drama, This Is What Happens To Pretty Girls, which premiered in Singapore in 2019. He is also the author of several best-selling children's books including Kelly and the Krumps, which won the Hedwig Anuar Book Award in 2020.

== Career ==
After graduating from the University of Cambridge in 2003, Kwek worked as a camera assistant on various film productions in the United Kingdom. During this time, he also shot and produced The Ballad of Vicki and Jake, a documentary about a heroin addict struggling to raise her 11-year-old son in the ghettos of Bristol. The film won the Best Newcomer Award at the 2006 Visions Du Reel Film Festival in Switzerland.

In 2008, after a three-year stint as a newspaper journalist, Kwek returned to filmmaking. He penned The Blue Mansion, a satirical comedy of manners. He also co-wrote the crime thriller Kidnapper and the period musical comedy It's a Great, Great World with director Kelvin Tong.

In 2011, Kwek directed a trio of short films, Sex.Violence.FamilyValues. The component films, Cartoons, Porn Masala and The Bouncer, were selected for the Miami International Short Film Festival, Hollywood Reel Independent Film Festival, Seoul International Youth Film Festival and Sydney Underground Film Festival, amongst others. Porn Masala won the Audience Choice Award (Short Film) at the Gotham Screen Film Festival and was nominated for Best Comedy at the Super Shorts Film Festival in London.

In 2012, Sex.Violence.FamilyValues was acquired by distributor Cathay, the first Singapore omnibus film to get a major theatrical release in Singapore. However, on 8 October 2012, just three days before the film's slated release, Singapore's Media Development Authority (MDA) revoked the film's M18 rating and banned it, citing public complaints about the film trailers' "racially offensive" content. The ban ignited a debate about censorship in Singapore's Parliament.

Kwek's first feature film, Unlucky Plaza (2014) made its world premiere at the Toronto International Film Festival in September and opened the Singapore International Film Festival in December. In January 2016, the film was withdrawn from Kuala Lumpur's Titian Budaya Festival after Malaysian censors requested eight to ten edits to it, including its sex scenes and language. Unlucky Plaza opened in the United States in the same month, playing in New York City and Los Angeles. The film, which travelled to various film festivals, including the Warsaw Film Festival, Kolkata International Film Festival, International Film Festival Manhattan (where Quizon picked up the Best Actor award) and the Tehran Jasmine Film Festival (where Kwek won the Best Director prize), was also released in the Philippines.

In 2020, Kwek directed The Pitch, a short comedy about the trials of three real-life theatre companies, Singapore Repertory Theatre, Wild Rice and Pangdemonium, struggling to survive the COVID-19 pandemic. The film won a Merit Award at the Global Shorts Film Awards. The Pitch was followed up by a full-length stage sequel, The Commission, which premiered at the Singapore International Festival of Arts in 2021. Kwek's other full-length works for the theatre include the political satire Apocalypse: LIVE!, which premiered at the OCBC Singapore Theatre Festival in 2008, and the MeToo drama This Is What Happens To Pretty Girls (2019). In 2018 Kwek started writing fiction, including books for children. His first book, Timothy And The Phubbers, was a national bestseller and his second, Kelly And The Krumps, was awarded the prestigious Hedwig Anuar Book Award.

Kwek was appointed Show Film Director for Singapore's National Day Parade in 2022. That same year, he released #LookAtMe, an LGBTQ themed neo-noir thriller, under his production company, Eko Pictures. The film premiered at the New York Asian Film Festival to critical acclaim and won a Special Jury Mention for Best Performer for its lead actor, Yao.

== Personal life ==
Kwek has one son with Pam Oei.

== Filmography ==
=== Feature films ===
Year	Film	Notes	Ref
2005	The Ballad of Vicki and Jake	Documentary film, as producer and writer	
2009	The Blue Mansion	As writer	
2010	Kidnapper	As writer	
2012	Sex.Violence.FamilyValues	Film anthology consisting of Cartoons, Porn Masala and The Bouncer As director, producer and writer	
2011	It's a Great, Great World	As writer	
2014	Unlucky Plaza	As director, producer and writer	
2022	#LookAtMe	As director, producer and writer	

=== Screenplays ===
Year	Title	Notes	Ref
2014	Unlucky Plaza		
2018	Republic of Food		
2019	Trafficker		
2020	Reappear		

=== Short films ===
Year	Film	Notes	Ref
2011	Cartoons	Collected in Sex.Violence.FamilyValues as part of anthology	
2011	Porn Masala	Collected in Sex.Violence.FamilyValues as part of anthology	
2012	The Bouncer	Collected in Sex.Violence.FamilyValues as part of anthology	
2020	The Pitch		
2023	A Closed system		

=== Music videos ===
Year	Song title	Notes	Ref
2015	Riot City		
2019	You Can't Touch Me Now		

== Theatre ==
Year	Title	Notes	Ref
2008	I’ll Have The Special		
2008	Apocalypse Live!		
2008	Real Actors		
2009	The Composer		
2019	This Is What Happens To Pretty Girls		
2020	The Zoologist	Online Play	
2021	The Commission		

== Bibliography ==
- Kwek, Ken (2018). Timothy and the Phubbers. Epigram Books. ISBN 978-981-4757-98-0.
- Kwek, Ken (2019). Kelly and the Krumps. Epigram Books. ISBN 978-981-17006-8-2.
