= Anita Sarawak =

- Born: Ithnaini binti Mohd Taib; 23 March 1952 (age 74); Singapore
- Spouse(s): Mohamed Abdul Samad (m. 1972 – div. 1976); Broery Marantika (m. 1981 – div. 1985); James Dean Nicholson (m. 1995 – div. 1999); Mohammad Mahathir Abdullah (m. 2001)
- Parent(s): Dato' S Roomai Noor (father); Siput Sarawak (mother)
- Musical career
- Genres: Jazz; pop
- Occupation: Singer
- Instrument: Vocals
- Years active: 1956–2010

Ithnaini binti Mohamed Taib (born 23 March 1952), better known by her stage name Anita Sarawak, is a Singaporean singer.

== Early years ==
Anita is the only child of actor and director S. Roomai Noor and actress Siput Sarawak. Her parents separated when she was 9 months old and Anita lived with her father. When Anita was around 12 years old, she went to live with her mother Siput and started preparation for her acting career.

== Career ==
At 14, Anita acted in her first film, Dua Kali Lima.

At 15, Anita started performing at weddings and other functions. Anita first came to prominence at the age of 17, when she released her debut album With A Lot O’ Soul. In 1974, she released her first Malay album.

Throughout the 1970s, Anita actively promoted Singapore as a tourist destination through her performances. In 1974, she performed for a week in Hawaii; in 1975, she performed for nine days in West Germany; in 1976 in Monte Carlo for two weeks.

In 1979, she launched a three-month performing tour of the United States, including shows in New York, San Francisco and Chicago.

In 1985, she took off for Las Vegas and spent 18 years there performing at Caesars Palace.

Anita has also hosted The Anita Talkshow and Astana and acted in the telecomedy Agensi Melor and the telemovie Topeng (Mask). She also released a cookbook, Cooking with Love, in 2004.

In 2011, Anita retreated from public life, according to entertainment journalist Roslen Fadzil, to whom the singer reached out in 2022 to dispel rumors of her death, illness, and divorce.

In 2017, Sarawak was inducted into Singapore's Women Hall of Fame.

== Personal life ==
Anita has been married four times.

In December 1972, Anita married Mohamed Abdul Samad. The couple divorced in August 1979.

In October 1981, Anita married the Indonesian singer Broery Pesulima. Anita's father objected to the marriage as Broery is Christian while Anita is a Muslim. Broery converted to Islam during their marriage but the couple later separated. Broery later renounced Islam and converted back to Christianity.

In 1995, Anita was caught for close proximity (khalwat) with her third husband J.D. Nicholas of the musical group The Commodores, to whom she was engaged at the time. Anita attended a hearing in court and paid a fine.

She is currently married to her British manager, Mohamad Mahathir Abdullah (formerly Martin Cox). The couple first met in Las Vegas, and wed in 2001.

In September 2009, Anita's husband was attacked outside her stepmother Datin Umi Kalthum's home in Taman Melawati, Malaysia. Anita subsequently forgave the robbers.

In February 2011, Anita collected the Legend Award for her mother, Siput Sarawak, at the Seri Temasek Awards. Anita said, "It was the proudest day of my life, an exceptional and emotional moment."

Anita retired from public life in 2011 and has been living a private life in Las Vegas, United States.

Her stepmother Datin Umi Kalthum, a veteran Malaysian actress, passed away in July 2013. Anita could not return for the funeral.

In 2022, Anita contacted entertainment journalist Roslen Fadzil to dispel rumours about her health and personal status.

== Discography ==
=== EP ===
Year	Title	Release info	Notes	Ref.
1969	With A Lot O’ Soul	Columbia ECHK-621	Backed by The Mandarins	

=== Album ===
Year	Title	Notes	Ref.
1969	With A Lot O’ Soul		
1971	Papa Ku Pulang		
1972	La La La Lu		
1973	Beautiful Saturday/Sunday		
1974	Between Me and He		
1974	Antara Aku dan Dia		
1974	Pesan Ayah		
1975	Environmental Terpuja		
1975	Live at the Mandarin Singapore		
1976	Joint hummed Anita		
1976	Sophisticated Lady		
1976	Gembira Bersama		
1977	Love Me		
1978	Dancing in the City		
1979	Gayamu Biar Sederhana		
1979	Anita Sarawak		
1981	For the Love		
1982	Peace (Damai)		
1984	Kenangan Manis		
1984	Bawalah Daku Pergi		
1985	Dunia Oh Dunia / Aku Menyayangimu		
1989	Asmara		
1990	Cinta Nan Satu		
1992	Antara Yang Manis		
1993	Bisikan Cinta		
2004	Seksis		
2005	Another Dimension		
2008	Anita Sarawak: Her Complete Evergreen Collection		
2009	Era Music Hits		
2010	Cinta Anita (Love Anita)		

== Filmography ==
=== Film ===
Year	Title	Role	Notes
1956	Penchuri		
1966	Dua Kali Lima		
1974	Semambu Kuning		
2003	Mr. Cinderella 2		
2006	Diva Popular		

=== Host TV ===
Year	Title	Role	TV channel
2003	Anita	Herself/host	Astro Ria
2007–2010	Kwek Mambo Anita	Herself/host	Astro Prima
2009–2010	Astana	Herself/host	Astro Ria

=== Television series ===
Year	Title	Role	TV channel
2003	Selagi ada Kasih		Mediacorp Suria
2005	Agensi Melor		Astro Ria
2008	Papaku Rock		Astro Ria

=== Television movie ===
Year	Title	Role	TV channel
2004	Topeng		Astro Ria

== In popular culture ==
Anita Sarawak was featured in cartoonist, Lat's 1980 compilation of New Straits Times cartoons, With a Little Bit of Lat, published in 1980 by Berita Publishing.
