= Pam Oei =

Singaporean actress

Pamela Oei
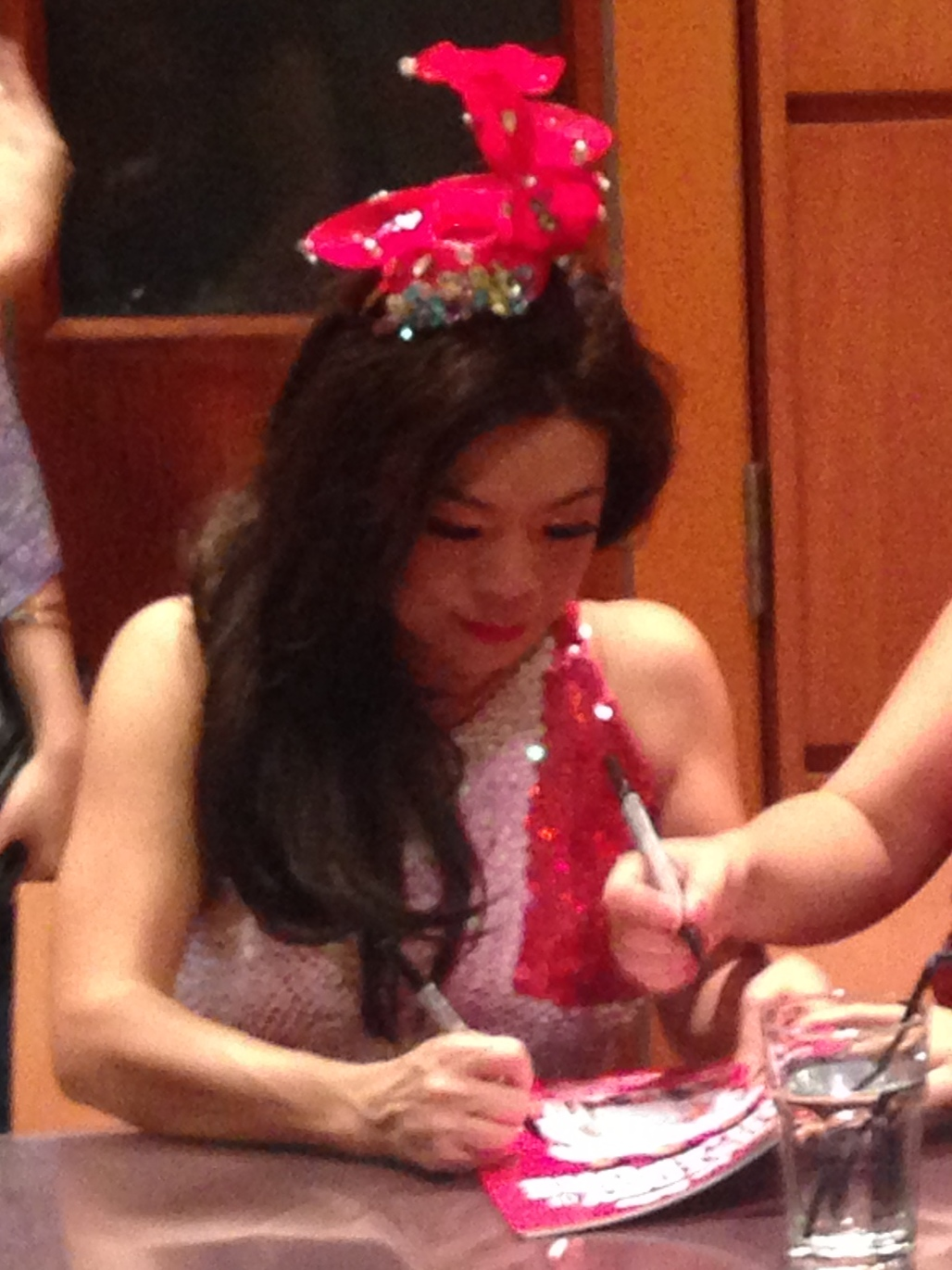
- Oei in 2014
- Born: 26 January 1972 (age 54); Singapore
- Occupation: Actress
- Spouse: Ken Kwek (div. 2025)
- Children: 1
- Musical career
- Years active: 1996–present
- Member of: Dim Sum Dollies

Pamela Oei (born 26 January 1972) is a Singaporean theatre actress.

== Background ==
Oei is part of the cabaret trio Dim Sum Dollies. She is also a certified Allen Carr therapist.

== Film roles ==
Oei played the part of Peggy in the 1998 comedy romance Peggy Su! which was about a 19-year-old Chinese woman living in Liverpool, England in the early 1960s.

== Personal life ==
Oei is married to the Singaporean writer-director and filmmaker Ken Kwek, and the couple has one son.
