= List of Under One Roof (Singaporean TV series) episodes =

Under One Roof is a Singaporean television sitcom that premiered on MediaCorp TV Channel 5 from 21 February 1995 to 15 July 2003. The series was created by Andrea Teo, Wee Thye Seah, Simmon Tan, Seah Chang Un and Angelena Loh, produced by Mediacorp Studios and starring Moses Lim, Koh Chieng Mun, Vernetta Lopez, Nicholas Lee, Andrew Lim, Norleena Salim, Zaibo, Daisy Irani, Rajiv Dhawn and Selena Tan. A total of 137 episodes of Under One Roof have aired across seven seasons.

== Series overview ==
Series	Episodes		Originally released	
Series	Episodes		First released	Last released
1	16		21 February 1995	6 June 1995
2	22		9 April 1996	3 September 1996
3	20		18 March 1997	29 July 1997
4	22		25 March 1998	18 August 1998
5	36	26	6 April 1999	28 September 1999
5	36	10	4 January 2000	7 March 2000
6	9		20 February 2001	10 April 2001
7	12		29 April 2003	15 July 2003

== Episodes ==
=== Season 1 (1995) ===
No. overall	No. in season	Title	Directed by	Written by	Original release date
1	1	"Joy, Luck and Harmony"	Andrea Teo	Angelena Loh; Seah Chang Un; Simmon Tan	21 February 1995
2	2	"Music, Ozone and Air Fresheners"	Andrea Teo	Angelena Loh; Andrew Chiang Meng Ngin; Seah Chang Un	28 February 1995
3	3	"Candy"	Andrea Teo	Angelena Loh; Seah Chang Un	7 March 1995
4	4	"He Ain't Pesky, He's My Brother"	Andrea Teo	Angelena Loh; Seah Chang Un; Simmon Tan	14 March 1995
5	5	"When a Man Loves a Women (Part 1)"	Andrea Teo	Angelena Loh; Seah Chang Un; Simmon Tan	21 March 1995
6	6	"When a Man Loves a Women (Part 2)"	Andrea Teo	Angelena Loh; Seah Chang Un; Simmon Tan	28 March 1995
7	7	"Party Animal"	Seah Wee Thye	Angelena Loh; Seah Chang Un; Simmon Tan	4 April 1995
8	8	"Hot Air"	Andrea Teo	Angelena Loh; Seah Chang Un; Simmon Tan	11 April 1995
9	9	"Excuse Me, Are You a Phantom?"	Andrea Teo	Angelena Loh; Ian David Row; Seah Chang Un	18 April 1995
10	10	"Abigail"	Andrea Teo	Angelena Loh; Seah Chang Un; Simmon Tan	25 April 1995
11	11	"Shop Till You Drop"	Andrea Teo	Angelena Loh; Seah Chang Un; Simmon Tan	2 May 1995
12	12	"Vegans and Violas (Part 1)"	Andrea Teo	Angelena Loh; Seah Chang Un; Simmon Tan	9 May 1995
13	13	"Vegans and Violas (Part 2)"	Andrea Teo	Angelena Loh; Seah Chang Un; Simmon Tan	16 May 1995
14	14	"Burn, Old Flame, Burn"	Andrea Teo	Angelena Loh; Seah Chang Un; Simmon Tan	23 May 1995
15	15	"Mat Rock and Mee Rebus"	Andrea Teo	Angelena Loh; Seah Chang Un; Simmon Tan	30 May 1995
16	16	"Sing a Song of Sally"	Andrea Teo	Angelena Loh; Ian David Row; Seah Chang Un	6 June 1995

=== Season 2 (1996) ===
No. overall	No. in season	Title	Directed by	Written by	Original release date
17	1	"'Tis the Season to be Jolly"	Colin Cairnes	Ian David Row; Seah Chang Un; Simmon Tan	9 April 1996
18	2	"She Drives Me Crazy"	Andrea Teo	Ian David Row; Seah Chang Un; Simmon Tan	16 April 1996
19	3	"Share and Share Alike"	Andrea Teo	Ian David Row; Seah Chang Un; Simmon Tan	23 April 1996
20	4	"The Good, the Bad and the Kiasu"	Andrea Teo	Ian David Row; Seah Chang Un; Simmon Tan	30 April 1996
21	5	"First Kisses and Male Bonding"	Andrea Teo	Ian David Row; Seah Chang Un; Simmon Tan	7 May 1996
22	6	"Games People Play"	Colin Cairnes; Andrea Teo	Ian David Row; Seah Chang Un; Simmon Tan	14 May 1996
23	7	"The Birthday Blues"	Colin Cairnes	Angelena Loh; Ian David Row; Seah Chang Un	21 May 1996
24	8	"Woman of the Year"	Colin Cairnes	Ian David Row; Seah Chang Un; Simmon Tan	28 May 1996
25	9	"The Karaoke Caper"	Colin Cairnes	Angelena Loh; Ian David Row; Seah Chang Un	4 June 1996
26	10	"Things Found in the Mailbox"	Andrea Teo	Ian David Row; Seah Chang Un; Simmon Tan	11 June 1996
27	11	"Whole Lotta Sweatin' Goin' On"	Andrea Teo	Ian David Row; Seah Chang Un; Simmon Tan	18 June 1996
28	12	"Once Upon a Time in Bishan"	Andrea Teo	Ian David Row; Seah Chang Un; Simmon Tan	25 June 1996
29	13	"Love Is..."	Colin Cairnes	Ian David Row; Seah Chang Un; Simmon Tan	2 July 1996
30	14	"Close Encounters"	Colin Cairnes	Ian David Row; Seah Chang Un; Simmon Tan	9 July 1996
31	15	"Sweet Charity"	Colin Cairnes	Ian David Row; Seah Chang Un; Simmon Tan	16 July 1996
32	16	"Wooing Miss Winnie"	Colin Cairnes	Ian David Row; Seah Chang Un; Simmon Tan	23 July 1996
33	17	"Vital Signs"	Colin Cairnes	Kim Ong; Ian David Row; Seah Chang Un	30 July 1996
34	18	"Daisy and the Deadline"	Andrea Teo	Ian David Row; Seah Chang Un; Simmon Tan	6 August 1996
35	19	"Last Bus to Taiping"	Colin Cairnes	Kim Ong; Ian David Row; Seah Chang Un	13 August 1996
36	20	"It Was Thirty Years Ago Today"	Andrea Teo	Ian David Row; Seah Chang Un; Simmon Tan	20 August 1996
37	21	"Fever"	Seah Wee Thye	Kim Ong; Ian David Row; Seah Chang Un	27 August 1996
38	22	"The Challenge"	Seah Wee Thye	Kim Ong; Ian David Row; Seah Chang Un	3 September 1996

=== Season 3 (1997) ===
No. overall	No. in season	Title	Directed by	Written by	Original release date
39	1	"Love and Laksa"	Seah Wee Thye	Lynette Chiu; Anne Fenn; Zara Lopez	18 March 1997
40	2	"So Far So Good Lah!"	Seah Wee Thye	Lynette Chiu; Anne Fenn; Zara Lopez	25 March 1997
41	3	"Be My Baby Tonight"	Seah Wee Thye	Lynette Chiu; Anne Fenn; Zara Lopez	1 April 1997
42	4	"Eat Drink Mother Daughter"	Seah Wee Thye	Lynette Chiu; Anne Fenn; Zara Lopez	8 April 1997
43	5	"Hiccups and Downs"	Seah Wee Thye	Lynette Chiu; Anne Fenn; Sam Chern Hsien Lee	15 April 1997
44	6	"Last Tango in Bishan"	Jennifer Tan	Lynette Chiu; Anne Fenn; Sam Chern Hsien Lee	22 April 1997
45	7	"Say You Love Mee"	Jennifer Tan	Lynette Chiu; Anne Fenn; Sam Chern Hsien Lee	29 April 1997
46	8	"Eat a Bowl of Everything!"	Jennifer Tan	Lynette Chiu; Anne Fenn; Sam Chern Hsien Lee	6 May 1997
47	9	"Driving Ms Dolly"	Jennifer Tan	Lynette Chiu; Anne Fenn; Sam Chern Hsien Lee	13 May 1997
48	10	"Blood is Thicker Than Paint"	Seah Wee Thye	Lynette Chiu; Anne Fenn; Sam Chern Hsien Lee	20 May 1997
49	11	"Love Bites"	Seah Wee Thye	Lynette Chiu; Anne Fenn; Sam Chern Hsien Lee	27 May 1997
50	12	"Till Trust Do Us Part (Part 1)"	Jennifer Tan	Lynette Chiu; Anne Fenn; Sam Chern Hsien Lee	3 June 1997
51	13	"Till Trust Do Us Part (Part 2)"	Seah Wee Thye	Lynette Chiu; Anne Fenn; Sam Chern Hsien Lee	10 June 1997
52	14	"Michael Returns!"	Jennifer Tan	Lynette Chiu; Anne Fenn; Sam Chern Hsien Lee	17 June 1997
53	15	"Of Parrots and Parades"	Jennifer Tan	Lynette Chiu; Anne Fenn; Sam Chern Hsien Lee	24 June 1997
54	16	"Rosnah Sings the Blues"	Jennifer Tan	Lynette Chiu; Anne Fenn; Sam Chern Hsien Lee	1 July 1997
55	17	"A Close Shave"	Jennifer Tan	Lynette Chiu; Anne Fenn; Sam Chern Hsien Lee	8 July 1997
56	18	"Home is Where the Kitchen Is"	Jennifer Tan	Lynette Chiu; Anne Fenn; Sam Chern Hsien Lee	15 July 1997
57	19	"Mystery of the Midnight Ghost"	Seah Wee Thye	Lynette Chiu; Anne Fenn; Sam Chern Hsien Lee	22 July 1997
58	20	"Crossroads: Crossed Wires"	Andrea Teo	Lynette Chiu; Anne Fenn; Sam Chern Hsien Lee	29 July 1997

=== Season 4 (1998) ===
No. overall	No. in season	Title	Directed by	Written by	Original release date
59	1	"Thirty Old Man"	Seah Wee Thye	Lynette Chiu; Anne Fenn; Sam Chern Hsien Lee	25 March 1998
60	2	"Basketball Blues"	Seah Wee Thye	Lynette Chiu; Anne Fenn; Sam Chern Hsien Lee	7 April 1998
61	3	"Buddy Boss"	Seah Wee Thye	Lynette Chiu; Anne Fenn; Sam Chern Hsien Lee	14 April 1998
62	4	"Revenge of the Brothers Wong"	Seah Wee Thye	Lynette Chiu; Anne Fenn; Sam Chern Hsien Lee	21 April 1998
63	5	"Water Gets in Your Ears"	Seah Wee Thye	Lynette Chiu; Anne Fenn; Sam Chern Hsien Lee	28 April 1998
64	6	"The Magic Stone"	Seah Wee Thye	Lynette Chiu; Sam Chern Hsien Lee; Zara Lopez	5 May 1998
65	7	"The Great Golf Gladiators"	Daisy Irani	Lynette Chiu; Anne Fenn; Sam Chern Hsien Lee	12 May 1998
66	8	"The Visiting Niece"	Seah Wee Thye	Lynette Chiu; Anne Fenn; Sam Chern Hsien Lee	19 May 1998
67	9	"Just Friends"	Seah Wee Thye	Lynette Chiu; Anne Fenn; Sam Chern Hsien Lee	26 May 1998
68	10	"Teck and the Harley"	Daisy Irani	Lynette Chiu; Anne Fenn; Sam Chern Hsien Lee	2 June 1998
69	11	"Madam Mahjong"	Seah Wee Thye	Lynette Chiu; Anne Fenn; Sam Chern Hsien Lee	9 June 1998
70	12	"Who am I?"	Daisy Irani	Lynette Chiu; Anne Fenn; Sam Chern Hsien Lee	16 June 1998
71	13	"Lights, Camera, Rejection"	Seah Wee Thye	Lynette Chiu; Anne Fenn; Sam Chern Hsien Lee	23 June 1998
72	14	"Like Father, Unlike Son"	Seah Wee Thye	Lynette Chiu; Sam Chern Hsien Lee; Zara Lopez	30 June 1998
73	15	"The Rookie"	Daisy Irani; Seah Wee Thye	Lynette Chiu; Sam Chern Hsien Lee; Zara Lopez	7 July 1998
74	16	"Very Few Good Men"	Seah Wee Thye	Lynette Chiu; Anne Fenn; Sam Chern Hsien Lee	14 July 1998
75	17	"Really, Truly, Madly"	Kelvin Ha; Daisy Irani	Lynette Chiu; Sam Chern Hsien Lee; Zara Lopez	21 July 1998
76	18	"Children of a Lesser Minimart Owner"	Daisy Irani	Lynette Chiu; Sam Chern Hsien Lee; Zara Lopez	28 July 1998
77	19	"Ping Pong Pal"	Kelvin Ha; Daisy Irani	Lynette Chiu; Sam Chern Hsien Lee; Zara Lopez	4 August 1998
78	20	"Long Before Your Time"	Seah Wee Thye	Lynette Chiu; Sam Chern Hsien Lee; Zara Lopez	11 August 1998
79	21	"Breakup Blues"	Seah Wee Thye	Lynette Chiu; Anne Fenn	18 August 1998
80	22	"When Debbie Met Michael"	Seah Wee Thye	Lynette Chiu; Sam Chern Hsien Lee	25 August 1998

=== Season 5 (1999–2000) ===
No. overall	No. in season	Title	Directed by	Written by	Original release date
Part 1
81	1	"The Good Old, Bad Old Days"	Daisy Irani	Lynette Chiu; Sam Chern Hsien Lee; Zara Lopez	6 April 1999
82	2	"The Thin Breadline"	Daisy Irani	Lynette Chiu; Sam Chern Hsien Lee; Zara Lopez	13 April 1999
83	3	"Your Minimart or Your Life"	Daisy Irani	Lynette Chiu; Sam Chern Hsien Lee; Zara Lopez	20 April 1999
84	4	"Friends-in-Law"	Seah Wee Thye	Lynette Chiu; Sam Chern Hsien Lee; Zara Lopez	27 April 1999
85	5	"The One"	Seah Wee Thye	Lynette Chiu; Sam Chern Hsien Lee; Zara Lopez	4 May 1999
86	6	"Who's That Boy?"	Seah Wee Thye	Lynette Chiu; Sam Chern Hsien Lee; Zara Lopez	11 May 1999
87	7	"Mum's Not Cooking"	Daisy Irani	Lynette Chiu; Sam Chern Hsien Lee; Zara Lopez	18 May 1999
88	8	"Growing Pains"	Seah Wee Thye	Lynette Chiu; Sam Chern Hsien Lee; Zara Lopez	25 May 1999
89	9	"When Bobby Met Dolly"	Daisy Irani	Lynette Chiu; Sam Chern Hsien Lee; Zara Lopez	1 June 1999
90	10	"The Gambler"	Daisy Irani	Lynette Chiu; Sam Chern Hsien Lee; Zara Lopez	8 June 1999
91	11	"Suspectfully Yours"	Seah Wee Thye	Lynette Chiu; Sam Chern Hsien Lee; Zara Lopez	15 June 1999
92	12	"Wishy-Washy Woes"	Daisy Irani	Lynette Chiu; Sam Chern Hsien Lee; Zara Lopez	22 June 1999
93	13	"Human Nature"	Daisy Irani	Lynette Chiu; Zara Lopez; Ong Su Mann	29 June 1999
94	14	"Help Me Not"	Daisy Irani	Lynette Chiu; Sam Chern Hsien Lee; Zara Lopez	6 July 1999
95	15	"Moustaches and Eyebrows"	Daisy Irani	Lynette Chiu; Zara Lopez; Ong Su Mann	13 July 1999
96	16	"Show Me the Money"	Daisy Irani	Lynette Chiu; Sam Chern Hsien Lee; Zara Lopez	20 July 1999
97	17	"The Other Men"	Seah Wee Thye	Lynette Chiu; Zara Lopez; Ong Su Mann	27 July 1999
98	18	"Misunderstood"	Seah Wee Thye	Lynette Chiu; Zara Lopez; Ong Su Mann	3 August 1999
99	19	"The Moral of the Story"	Seah Wee Thye	Lynette Chiu; Zara Lopez; Ong Su Mann	10 August 1999
100	20	"Habeas Corpus"	Daisy Irani	Lynette Chiu; Zara Lopez; Ong Su Mann	17 August 1999
101	21	"Matters of the Heart"	Seah Wee Thye	Lynette Chiu; Zara Lopez; Ong Su Mann	24 August 1999
102	22	"Mak Comes to Town"	Seah Wee Thye	Lynette Chiu; Zara Lopez; Ong Su Mann	31 August 1999
103	23	"Of Soups and Songs"	Seah Wee Thye	Lynette Chiu; Zara Lopez; Ong Su Mann	7 September 1999
104	24	"The Test"	Seah Wee Thye	Lynette Chiu; Zara Lopez; Ong Su Mann	14 September 1999
105	25	"Cold Feet"	Daisy Irani	Lynette Chiu; Zara Lopez; Ong Su Mann	21 September 1999
106	26	"To Go or Not to Go"	Seah Wee Thye	Lynette Chiu; Zara Lopez; Ong Su Mann	28 September 1999
Part 2
107	27	"Weekend With Bobby"	Seah Wee Thye	Lynette Chiu; Zara Lopez; Ong Su Mann	4 January 2000
108	28	"Mop and Socks"	Seah Wee Thye	Ong Su Mann; Seah Chang Un; Wei Lyn Tan	11 January 2000
109	29	"The Third Party"	Seah Wee Thye	Ong Su Mann; Seah Chang Un; Soo Sien Theng	18 January 2000
110	30	"Net Gain and Pain"	Daisy Irani	Ong Su Mann; Seah Chang Un; Wei Lyn Tan	25 January 2000
111	31	"Happiness"	Daisy Irani	Ong Su Mann; Seah Chang Un; Wei Lyn Tan	2 February 2000
112	32	"The Runaway Groom"	Daisy Irani	Ong Su Mann; Seah Chang Un; Wei Lyn Tan	9 February 2000
113	33	"Eyes Wide Open"	Seah Wee Thye	Lynette Chiu; Ong Su Mann; Chang Un Seah	16 February 2000
114	34	"Give and Teck"	Daisy Irani	Ong Su Mann; Chang Un Seah; Wei Lyn Tan	23 February 2000
115	35	"Big Fish, Bigger Fish"	Sharen Liu	Ong Su Mann; Chang Un Seah; Tarn How Tan	2 March 2000
116	36	"Oh Happy Day"	Seah Wee Thye	Zara Lopez; Ong Su Mann; Chang Un Seah	9 March 2000

=== Season 6 (2001) ===
No. overall	No. in season	Title	Directed by	Written by	Original release date
117	1	"No Place Like Home"	Jennifer Tan	Zara Lopez	20 February 2001
118	2	"Renovation Blues"	Daisy Irani	Sunita Hanson	27 February 2001
119	3	"Daddy's Home"	Daisy Irani	Sunita Hanson; Seah Chang Un	6 March 2001
120	4	"Fixing Things"	Daisy Irani	Wei Lyn Tan; Stephen Yan	13 March 2001
121	5	"Mind Your Own Business"	Daisy Irani	Stephen Yan	20 March 2001
122	6	"Too Close for Comfort"	Kelvin Ha	Lynette Chiu; Sunita Hanson	27 March 2001
123	7	"Not in Front of Your Parents"	Sharen Liu	Seah Chang Un; Esan Sivalingam	3 April 2001
124	8	"They Think It's All Over"	Sharen Liu	Seah Chang Un; Esan Sivalingam	10 April 2001
125	9	"Season Finale"	Daisy Irani	Seah Chang Un; Esan Sivalingam	17 April 2001

=== Season 7 (2003) ===
No. overall	No. in season	Title	Directed by	Written by	Original release date
126	1	"The Lie"	Daisy Irani	Seah Chang Un; Esan Sivalingam	29 April 2003
127	2	"The Hug"	Nicholas Lee	Seah Chang Un; Esan Sivalingam	6 May 2003
128	3	"The Stayer"	Nicholas Lee	Seah Chang Un; Esan Sivalingam	13 May 2003
129	4	"The TV Star"	Daisy Irani	Seah Chang Un; Esan Sivalingam	20 May 2003
130	5	"The Celebrity"	Daisy Irani	Nicholas Lee; Seah Chang Un; Esan Sivalingam	27 May 2003
131	6	"The Pitch"	Daisy Irani	Seah Chang Un; Esan Sivalingam	3 June 2003
132	7	"The Couch Potato"	Daisy Irani	Seah Chang Un; Esan Sivalingam	10 June 2003
133	8	"The Rival"	Daisy Irani	Seah Chang Un; Esan Sivalingam	17 June 2003
134	9	"The Bully"	Nicholas Lee	Seah Chang Un; Esan Sivalingam	24 June 2003
135	10	"The Traitor"	Daisy Irani	Seah Chang Un; Esan Sivalingam	1 July 2003
136	11	"The Secret"	Daisy Irani	Seah Chang Un; Esan Sivalingam	8 July 2003
137	12	"The Passbook"	Daisy Irani	Seah Chang Un; Esan Sivalingam	15 July 2003
