= TV5 (Philippine TV network) =

Philippine commercial television network

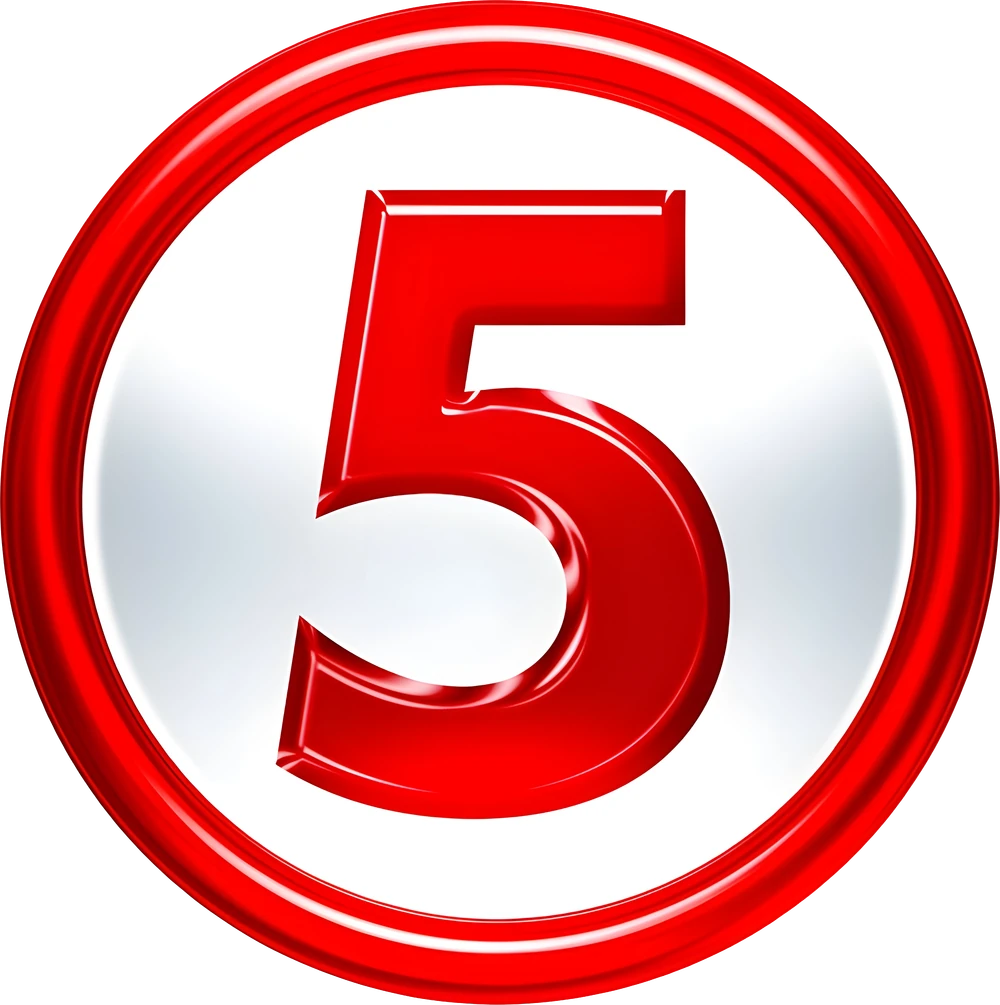
- Current logo, the sixth version of the 2010 logo, used since April 27, 2026

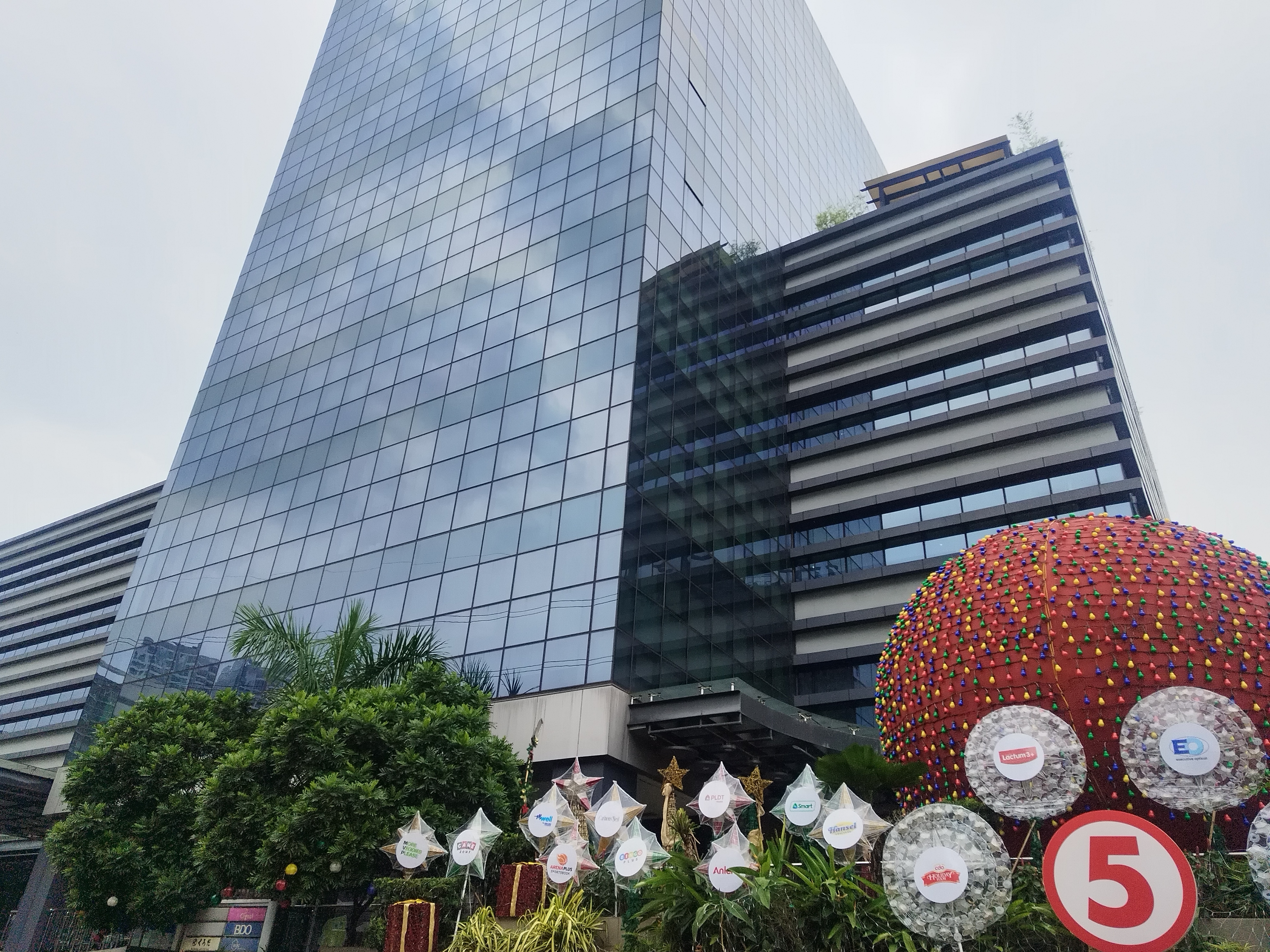
- TV5 Media Center at Reliance Street corner Sheridan Street, Mandaluyong, the headquarters of TV5 Network since 2013.
- Type: Broadcasting network
- Country: Philippines
- Broadcast area: Nationwide
- Stations: See list
- Headquarters: TV5 Media Center, Reliance cor. Sheridan Sts., Mandaluyong, Metro Manila, Philippines

Programming
- Languages: Filipino (main); English (secondary)
- Picture format: 720p/1080i HDTV (downscaled to 16:9 480i for the SDTV feed)

Ownership
- Owner: TV5 Network, Inc. (MediaQuest Holdings, Inc.)
- Key people: Manuel V. Pangilinan (Chairman); Victorico P. Vargas (President and CEO); Robert P. Galang (Consultant); Vicky de Leon (Chief Information Officer); Dong Capinpuyan (Broadcast Operations Head); Jana Manalaysay (On-Air Presentation Head); Jillmer Dy (Programming Head); Patrick Paez (Head, TV5 News); Sienna G. Olaso (Head, One Sports)
- Sister channels: RPTV; One Sports; Kapatid International; AksyonTV International; PBA Rush

History
- Founded: June 19, 1960; 66 years ago
- Launched: June 19, 1960; 66 years ago (radio); July 1962; 64 years ago (television; 1st incarnation); February 21, 1992 (television; 2nd incarnation)
- Founder: Joaquin "Chino" Roces
- Closed: September 23, 1972; 54 years ago (martial law)
- Replaced by: Kapatid Channel (Cignal TV channel space)
- Former names: Associated Broadcasting Corporation (ABC) (June 19, 1960–September 23, 1972); Associated Broadcasting Company (ABC) (February 21, 1992–August 8, 2008); The 5 Network (February 17, 2018–August 14, 2020)

Links
- Webcast: Live Streaming (Philippine users only)
- Website: www.tv5.com.ph

Availability

Terrestrial
- Analog VHF/UHF: Listings may vary
- Digital UHF: Listings may vary
- Sulit TV: Channel 1
- Sky Cable: Channel 10 (Mega Manila); Channel 4 (regional)
- Converge Vision / SkyTV (Metro Manila): Channel 5
- Sky Direct (Nationwide): Channel 4
- Cignal TV (Nationwide): Channel 5 (SD); Channel 255 (HD)
- SatLite (Nationwide): Channel 5
- G Sat (Nationwide): Channel 5
- Cablelink (Metro Manila, Cavite, Laguna, Bulacan, Tarlac): Channel 10

Streaming media
- Cignal Play: Available on the Cignal Play website or via mobile application

TV5 (Note: Branded as simply 5 and was formerly known as ABC) (formerly known as ABC) is a Philippine commercial broadcast network based in Mandaluyong, Metro Manila, with additional studios and transmitter facilities in Novaliches, Quezon City. It is the flagship property of TV5 Network Inc., a subsidiary of MediaQuest Holdings, which is controlled by the telecommunications company PLDT, Inc. (Note: TV5 is formally referred to as Kapatid Network in reference to the outline of the company's logo; the branding was introduced on April 4, 2010.)

TV5's main television station, DWET-TV, broadcasts on Channel 5 on analogue (VHF), Channel 18 on digital (UHF, ISDB-T), and Channel 51 on digital (UHF, ISDB-T) test transmission. The latter is licensed to its sister company, Mediascape/Cignal TV across Mega Manila. The network owns and operates eight TV stations and has 13 selected affiliate stations across the Philippines.

TV5 programming is also seen via streaming app CignalPlay and available throughout the Philippines, and its content can be accessed internationally via satellite and through global pay-television channels Kapatid International, AksyonTV International, and PBA Rush.

== History ==
=== Early years (1960–1986) ===
On June 19, 1960, Joaquin "Chino" Roces, owner of the Manila Times, obtained a radio-television franchise through Republic Act 2945. He established the Associated Broadcasting Corporation (ABC), with the initial studios located along Pasong Tamo in Makati, Rizal (now part of Metro Manila). ABC's first radio stations were DZMT (1100 kHz), DZTM (1380 kHz), and DZWS (1070 kHz). Established in July 1962 as DZTM-TV Channel 5, ABC became the seventh television network to operate in the Philippines. From July 1962 to September 1972, ABC operated radio and television services.

On September 23, 1972, President Ferdinand E. Marcos declared martial law, resulting in the forced shutdown of ABC and the Manila Times.

=== Return and growth (1986–2003) ===
After the People Power Revolution in 1986, Chino Roces advocated for the network's reinstatement with President Corazon Cojuangco-Aquino. Following Roces' death in 1988, his son Edgardo Roces along with Edward Tan took over efforts to revive the network. Tan and Roces secured approval from the Securities and Exchange Commission to increase capitalization. Soon after, they received a permit to operate from the National Telecommunications Commission (NTC). In 1990, ABC completed construction of its studio complex and transmitter tower in Barangay San Bartolome, Novaliches, Quezon City. Test broadcasts began later that year, featuring Japanese documentaries.

On February 21, 1992, the network returned to the air. The flagship station adopted the call sign DWET-TV under a new corporate entity as ABC Development Corporation, with Associated Broadcasting Company adopted as on-air and trade name, a nod to its pre-martial law incarnation.

Early in the network's revival, it expanded to Cebu, Davao, Baguio, Naga, Bacolod, Zamboanga, Cagayan de Oro, and General Santos. By the end of 1993, the network ranked third in ratings, with two more stations planned in 1994 ahead of its satellite broadcast launch.

In the 1990s, ABC aired a public service announcement titled Dial His Mother's Number daily at 6:00 pm, before the station ID and, on weekdays, the news program Balitang-Balita. It ran until 2004, after Antonio "Tonyboy" Cojuangco purchased the network and became its CEO.

On February 4, 1994, ABC launched nationwide satellite broadcasting. The network experienced rapid growth under Chief Operating Officer Tina Monzon-Palma. On December 9, 1994, ABC obtained a 25-year legislative franchise through Republic Act No. 7831, which authorized the network to establish and operate television and radio stations countrywide.

In 1998, ABC began airing Three Minutes a Day with Father James Reuter, SJ, a short daily gospel reflection produced by the Family Rosary Crusade that aired from Monday to Saturday. It aired until ABC's final sign-off on August 8, 2008, the day before the network relaunched as TV5.

In 2001, ABC started producing local versions of popular game shows, including The Price Is Right (hosted by Dawn Zulueta), Wheel of Fortune (hosted by Rustom Padilla), and Family Feud (hosted by Ogie Alcasid). The move came during a period of game show popularity among Philippine networks.

In 2001, ABC began airing a daily 3 o'clock Prayer from the Archdiocesan Shrine of the Divine Mercy in Mandaluyong. The segment also ended with ABC's farewell broadcast on August 8, 2008.

=== Cojuangco era (2003–2008) ===
In June 2003, the joint consortium of Tan and Roces sold ABC TV and radio stations to a group led by businessman Antonio "Tonyboy" Cojuangco Jr. Cojuangco, the former chairman of the Philippine Long Distance Telephone Company (PLDT) and owner of Dream Satellite TV and Bank of Commerce, formally acquired the assets in October of the same year. Cojuangco became the president and CEO of ABC, with Jose T. Pardo, a former secretary of the Department of Trade and Industry, serving as the network's board chairman.

Under the new management, changes were made to the news and public affairs division, broadcast equipment was upgraded, and the network acquired broadcast rights for Philippine Basketball Association (PBA) games. Network executives led by Roberto Barreiro coined a new slogan, "Iba Tayo!" ("We're Different!"), replacing "Come home to ABC!". ABC aimed to differentiate itself with fresh programming formats targeting the growing middle- to upper-class youth market. ABC continued to support the Family Rosary Crusade until August 3, 2008, days before its relaunch as TV5. The network featured the religious pre-identification campaign "Please Pray the Rosary" announcement before its programs, although this was gradually phased out during the programming revamp.

In 2005, ABC received the "Outstanding TV Station" award at the 2005 KBP Golden Dove Awards, and several programs on the network also received awards in their respective categories.

In early 2007, ABC implemented budget cuts that mainly affected its news department, resulting in significant layoffs and a diminished capacity for coverage before the 2007 general elections.

In November 2007, ABC launched new sports programming, including NBA basketball, professional boxing, and WWE events, as part of a five-year deal with Solar Entertainment. Due to high costs and poor ratings, the programs were dropped throughout 2008. The NBA review show House of Hoops was cut back and eventually cancelled by April 2008. The PBA, which was previously aired on ABC, did not have its contract renewed and instead found a new home on RPN through a partnership with Solar Entertainment, leading to RPN's privatization by Solar in 2011.

=== First TV5 era (2008–2018) ===
TV5 Media Center is located at the corner of Reliance Street and Sheridan Street, Mandaluyong, TV5 Network's HQ since 2013

==== ABC-MPB Primedia partnership (2008–2010) ====
In March 2008, Cojuangco announced a partnership between ABC and MPB Primedia Inc., a local company backed by Media Prima Berhad of Malaysia. The partnership was a long-term strategy to enhance ABC's competitiveness in the network wars between ABS-CBN and GMA. MPB Primedia Inc. was established as an asset for Media Prima's proposed private equity fund to invest in media companies in Southeast Asia. Under the agreement, MPB Primedia Inc. produced and sourced entertainment programs, while ABC would continue to be responsible for news programming and station operations. In addition, MPB Primedia was granted rights to schedule and manage sales of ABC-5's airtime. Christopher Sy was appointed CEO of MPB Primedia, Inc., but resigned in January 2009 due to reported differences in management style.

ABC aired its final broadcast at around 22:00 PST on August 8, 2008, with its late-night newscast Sentro as the last program. A countdown to the Network's relaunch followed until 19:00 PST the next day when it officially rebranded as TV5; the TV5 brand was also used as the trade name of MPB Primedia in press releases and station notices, while ABC retained its trade name after the relaunch. The network retained its alternative programming line-up but aimed to cater to "Progressive Pinoys, including those 'young at heart'" to market classes C and D. TV5 also unveiled an upgraded 120-kilowatt stereo TV transmitter. Some ABC programs, such as Shall We Dance, Nick on TV5, Kerygma TV, Light Talk, and Sunday TV Mass, were carried over to TV5's line-up. The TV5 AniMEGA, a programming block focused on Japanese anime series, was launched on the network.

Under the new management, TV5's audience share increased from 1.9% in the second quarter of 2008 (before the rebranding) to 11.1% in September 2009. That same month, TV5 began airing two hours of Singaporean content produced by MediaCorp's studios division, mainly its Mandarin dramas and English sitcoms, dubbed in Filipino, such as The Little Nyonya starring Jeanette Aw, Darren Lim, Apple Hong and Eelyn Kok, Under One Roof starring Vernetta Lopez, Koh Chieng Mun, Moses Lim, Nicholas Lee and Daisy Irani Subaiah, and Phua Chu Kang Pte Ltd starring Gurmit Singh and Irene Ang.

TV5 continued its partnership with the Family Rosary Crusade, which produced Holy Week specials including Ang Pitong Hapis ni Maria (2009), a Black Saturday special hosted by Father Erick Santos, Buhay ni Kristo (2012), and Sugo and Unos (2014). Its spin-off program Family Matters aired from 2010 to 2016.

==== Acquisition by PLDT, the Kapatid Network years (2010–2018) ====
On October 20, 2009, Media Prima announced its intention to divest its share in MPB Primedia / TV5, along with its affiliated ABC TV stations, and sell it to MediaQuest Holdings, the broadcasting division of PLDT. The decision was driven by the company's losses during the year. The acquisition was completed and officially announced by Chairman Manuel V. Pangilinan on March 2, 2010; he had previously intended to acquire ABC as early as 1999. New programming was introduced through a trade launch at the World Trade Center in Pasay and on April 4, 2010, the network rebranded itself as the "Kapatid" ("sibling") network which became its colloquial and trade name to compete with ABS-CBN and GMA Network.

On October 1, 2010, TV5 took over the management of MediaQuest's Nation Broadcasting Corporation (NBC) stations. DWFM was relaunched as Radyo5 92.3 News FM (now 105.9 True FM), a TV5-branded news radio station, on November 8, 2010. DWNB-TV was rebranded as AksyonTV, a news channel based on TV5's newscast Aksyon, on February 21, 2011. TV5 outranked GMA Network to become the second most-watched network in key cities in the Visayas and Mindanao regions, including Iloilo, Cebu, Bacolod, Davao, and Cagayan de Oro. The network shared the top spot with ABS-CBN in General Santos.

On December 23, 2013, TV5 began broadcasting from its new headquarters, the TV5 Media Center located in Reliance, Mandaluyong.

In 2014, TV5 acquired the Filipino broadcast rights to the 2014 Winter Olympics, the 2014 Summer Youth Olympics, and the 2016 Summer Olympics.

Despite financial struggles, TV5 remained operational. The network's programming, such as the PBA via Sports5 and the TV5 Kids block, contributed to its popularity. TV5 celebrated its fifth anniversary under the management of Manny V. Pangilinan with a trade launch of 2015 shows at the Sofitel Philippine Plaza on November 26, 2014.

TV5 started each year with a New Year's Eve countdown called Happy sa [year] at the Quezon Memorial Circle, a tradition that continued until 2017.

In 2015, the Network changed its corporate name from ABC Development Corporation to TV5 Network, Inc.

TV5 experienced growing financial difficulties, including losses and debt, primarily due to a reduction in advertisers and the effects of digitalization. This situation led to employee layoffs in September 2015. The network's in-house entertainment division was disbanded, and its Chief Entertainment Content Officer, Wilma Galvante, ended her consultancy agreement. Consequently, TV5's workforce shrank from around 4,000 employees in 2013–2014 to approximately 900 by late 2021.

Unable to produce original entertainment content until 2020, TV5 appointed Vicente "Vic" Del Rosario, CEO of Viva Entertainment, as the network's chief entertainment strategist. Changes were implemented in TV5's entertainment programming, including the formation of the Viva-TV5 joint venture Sari-Sari Channel and the outsourcing of Viva Television for entertainment shows. The partnership was announced at a trade launch in Bonifacio Global City, Taguig on November 25, 2015. However, several new shows were cancelled due to a lack of advertising support and poor ratings. TV5 renewed its partnership with Viva Entertainment in October 2020, focusing on local versions of foreign programming and TV remakes of Viva classic films.

From January 2016 until December 31, 2018, TV5 and Cignal, through Hyper, served as the official free-to-air and pay television partners, respectively, for the Ultimate Fighting Championship (UFC) in the Philippines.

In July 2016, TV5 started airing selected programs from MTV and MTV International as part of a deal with Viacom International Media Networks. The new MTV on TV5 block included shows like Catfish, Ridiculousness, and Ex on the Beach.

On September 8, 2016, TV5 cancelled its locally produced programs Aksyon Bisaya and Aksyon Dabaw due to cost-cutting measures. The personnel remained employed to continue filing reports for the national edition of Aksyon.

TV5 President and CEO Emmanuel "Noel" C. Lorenzana stepped down on September 30, 2016, and was replaced by basketball coach and Sports5/D5 Studio head Vicente "Chot" Reyes. Following Reyes' appointment, the Network announced a retrenchment of approximately 200 employees as part of TV5's digitalization efforts.

In April 2017, TV5 acquired the rights to air WWE programming after Fox Philippines decided not to renew its contract with the WWE.

On October 12, 2017, TV5 Network announced its partnership with ESPN, obtaining the licensing rights for PBA, UFC, PSL, and the NFL, as well as access to ESPN programs and content. The partnership led to the formation of the ESPN5 brand, which aired on TV5 and AksyonTV. The move was part of TV5's temporary shift from a general entertainment station to a sports and news channel.

=== The 5 Network era and reverting to TV5 (2018–2020) ===
Logo used from February 17, 2018, to January 12, 2019, with the current "5" wordmark used since April 4, 2010

On February 17, 2018, TV5 underwent a rebranding and was relaunched as the 5 Network or simply 5. The new logo dropped the word "TV" and was designed to be more flexible for use by the network's other divisions. The programming grid was divided into three blocks – ESPN5 for sports, News5 for news programs, and 'On 5' for other content. Additionally, D5 Studio focused on digital content, while Studio 5 produced Filipino productions for various platforms. The "Kapatid" ("sibling") moniker was de-emphasized during the period and was mainly used by News5 and ESPN5 for some programs. The network phased out Filipino-dubbed movies and foreign-acquired programming, which had been a practice since 2008, while Disney programs and movies aired in their original audio until 2019.

On January 13, 2019, TV5 introduced a variation of its 2018 logo, which included the respective websites of the division producing the program as part of their on-screen graphics following the launch of 5 Plus.

On April 22, 2019, TV5's legislative franchise was renewed for another 25 years under Republic Act No. 11320.

On June 3, 2019, Chot Reyes retired as TV5 President and CEO and was succeeded by Jane Basas, who led pay TV provider and radio company Cignal TV/Mediascape. Under Basas' leadership, the network outsourced news and sports programming from its co-owned Cignal channels, phased out daytime ESPN5 programs, focused on archived entertainment programs, and expanded movie blocks on 5 Plus. Plans for the network included retaining existing news programs and sports content in primetime and reintroducing original entertainment programming through outsourcing. Perci Interlan returned as the head of programming in November.

On February 4, 2020, Robert P. Galang was appointed as the new president and CEO of TV5 Network and Cignal TV, replacing Basas, who in turn was appointed as the Chief Marketing Officer of Smart Communications.

On March 8, 2020, 5 Plus was relaunched as One Sports, and the ESPN5 division was renamed and merged into the brand. The sports programming on 5 no longer carried the ESPN5 banner. The ESPN5 partnership continued online, with ESPN5.com serving as the sports portal of One Sports and ESPN in the Philippines until October 13, 2021. TV5 Network announced on the same day that 5 would be rebranded as One TV on April 13, 2020. However, due to the COVID-19 pandemic and disapproval from viewers and fans, the rebranding was postponed to July 20, until it was ultimately cancelled. The network returned to the TV5 brand on July 20, 2020, and introduced new Filipino-dubbed series.

On July 27, 2020, Cignal TV, TV5, and Smart Communications announced a multi-year deal with the National Basketball Association (NBA) for the league's official broadcast rights in the Philippines, replacing Solar Entertainment Corporation. The games during the 2019–2020 season were aired live on free-to-air networks TV5 and One Sports. This marked the return of the NBA to TV5 since the partnership between the then-ABC and Solar Entertainment Corporation from 2007 to 2008.

=== Second TV5 era and collaboration with Cignal TV (2020–present) ===
Logo used from January 13, 2019, to May 19, 2021, the second revision of the 2010 logo

The old headquarters of TV5 in Novaliches in 2022

Logo used from May 20, 2021, to April 26, 2026, the third revision of the 2010 logo

On August 15, 2020, Channel 5 reverted to its former name, TV5, and announced a partnership with its sister company Cignal TV, which was tasked with handling its programming. The partnership with Cignal TV introduced a slate of new entertainment programs and collaborations with other networks, including GMA Network, RPN, ZOE Broadcasting Network's A2Z and AMBS' All TV. TV5 unveiled its first wave of entertainment programs produced by companies such as Archangel Media/APT Entertainment, Content Cows Company Inc., Luminous Productions Inc., Regal Entertainment, Viva Television, and Brightlight Productions. Additionally, shows from ABS-CBN that were affected by the network's franchise non-renewal were transferred to TV5. In mid-September 2020, TV5 announced a second wave of programs for October, including shows produced by Regal, Viva, APT Entertainment, Brightlight Productions, and News5.

On January 24, 2021, TV5 has aired selected programming produced by ABS-CBN Studios following the shutdown of its free-to-air network. Programs included ASAP XP (2021–present, now hookup with All TV since 2026), Primetime Bida and Yes Weekend! (select programs only, 2021–present, now hookup with All TV since 2024), FPJ: Da King (2021–2023, now returned on GMA Network as FPJ sa GMA since 2025), It's Showtime (2022–2023, now moved on both All TV and GMA Network since 2024), Nag-aapoy Na Damdamin and Pira-Pirasong Paraiso (2023–2024 as part of Kapamilya Gold and reruns in 2026), Magandang Buhay (2023–2024, later moved on All TV from 2024 to 2026), Rated Korina (2023–present, originally by Brightlight Productions when the show transferred to TV5 from October 24, 2020 to June 16, 2023, now hookup with All TV since 2025), Sunday Blockbusters (2024), and Blockbusters sa Umaga (2026–present, hookup with A2Z and All TV). TV5 suspended the airing of newly released ABS-CBN content from January 2 to June 21, 2026, due to a financial dispute that was later settled.

TV5 introduced its revamped programming under the slogan "TV5 TodoMax," dividing programs into five blocks: TodoMax Kids, TodoMax Serbisyo (Idol in Action), TodoMax Panalo (the afternoon programming lineup), TodoMax Primetime (Singko), and TodoMax Weekend.

Following the programming revamp, TV5 became the second most-watched TV network in prime-time TV ratings, according to AGB Nielsen, which conducts audience measurements for television ratings in specific areas of the Philippines. Primetime programs produced by MQuest Ventures/Cignal/TV5 Entertainment, in association with various content company (such as UXS, The IdeaFirst Company, Viva Entertainment, ABS-CBN Studios, APT Entertainment, Brightlight Productions, Regal Entertainment, Cornerstone Studios and other various productions), contributed to the achievement.

On May 20, 2021, TV5 launched its new slogan "Iba sa 5" (which roughly translates to "It's different on 5") along with a new station jingle, station ID, and a revision of the 2010 logo with a darker red scheme. On July 1, 2022, the network introduced a new slogan, "Iba'ng Saya peg Sama-Sama" (The Fun is One of a Kind When We're Together), accompanied by another new station jingle and ID.

On January 31, 2023, Guido R. Zaballero was appointed as the president and CEO of TV5 Network, effective February 1, 2023. The appointment followed the retirement of Robert P. Galang, who had led Cignal TV and TV5 since February 2020. Jane J. Basas assumed the role of president and CEO of Cignal TV, while also serving as the president and CEO of MediaQuest, the holding company of TV5 and Cignal TV.

On April 27, 2026, TV5 updated its 2021 logo to a three-dimensional, metallic, beveled version as part of a "fresh start" for a new programming era.

On November 3, 2026, Zaballero who has spent nearly 14 years with the MediaQuest group and led TV5 since February 2023, is stepping down from his leadership position for personal reasons as president and CEO of TV5 with Ricky Vargas assuming the transitional role.

==== Transition to high definition (2023) ====
On March 21, 2023, TV5 announced the launch of its main channel in high-definition (HD) feed, presented in a full-screen format, on Cignal TV. The channel officially launched as TV5 HD on April 1, 2023.

On April 16, 2023, TV5 began broadcasting in an anamorphic 16:9 aspect ratio on free-to-air digital television.

== Branding ==
=== Network name changes ===
TV5, originally known as the Associated Broadcasting Corporation (ABC), has changed its name several times.

- Associated Broadcasting Corporation (1960–1972): Founded by Joaquin "Chino" Roces in 1960, ABC was forced to shut down in 1972 due to the declaration of Martial Law by President Marcos.
- Associated Broadcasting Company (1992–2008): Fully restored in 1992 after being granted a new franchise, ABC was led by new stockholders Edward Tan and Edgardo Roces. Businessman Antonio O. Cojuangco Jr. acquired the company in 2003.
- TV5 (first era; 2008–2018): Renamed TV5 after entering a partnership with MPB Primedia, Inc., backed by the Malaysian media group Media Prima Berhad. In 2010, Media Prima divested its share to MediaQuest Holdings, Inc., led by Manuel V. Pangilinan. The TV5 branding became obsolete when the network was relaunched as "5" on February 17, 2018.
- 5 (The 5 Network) (2018–2020): TV5 was rebranded as The 5 Network or simply 5 in 2018. The network used a numerical 5 logo and divided its programming grid into news, sports, and entertainment. However, the TV5 branding was still used to refer to both the network itself and the company, as well as for sign-on and sign-off messages, social media accounts, and selected program teasers. "The 5 Network" branding was retired on August 14, 2020, but the numerical 5 logo variant from 2019 was retained. The "5" naming was reinstated in 2021 for TV5's slogan, "Iba sa 5".
- One TV (cancelled; 2020): Originally planned for rebranding on April 13, 2020, and later rescheduled for July 20, 2020, One TV was ultimately cancelled due to viewer confusion and the ongoing COVID-19 pandemic, thus making the network revert to the TV5 branding.
- TV5 (second era; 2020–present): TV5 was officially restored as the network's full-time identity on August 15, 2020, coinciding with the return of local entertainment programs. The "TV5" is commonly used for program teasers on TV, radio, and social media.

TV5 has used several logos throughout its history. Notable variations include the pinwheel logo from 1992 to 2004, the ABC logo with a yellow circle introduced in 2004, and the shaking television logo adopted after the 2008 relaunch. In 2018, TV5 introduced the numerical 5 logo, a redesign of the 2010 logo that dropped the word "TV" and incorporated the program title within the logo. A variation of this logo was unveiled in 2019, which featured a light red color, but changed to a darker red color in 2021 and modified into a 3D variant in 2026.

== Programming ==
TV5 was relaunched in 2008 and gained popularity for its AniMEGA anime programming block. It introduced Filipino-dubbed Japanese anime series to Philippine television, including Code Geass, Azumanga Daioh and Fullmetal Alchemist: Brotherhood. AniMEGA returned across several relaunches; it aired again in both 2015 and 2017 and partnered with Aniplus Asia to bring shows such as Sword Art Online, Attack on Titan: Junior High and Is It Wrong to Try to Pick Up Girls in a Dungeon?. The network also gained attention for its original horror drama series Midnight DJ (2008–2011) and its broadcast of Filipino-dubbed Singaporean series The Little Nyonya, Under One Roof, and Phua Chu Kang Pte Ltd.

TV5 also aired a number of tabloid talk shows that often featured heated on-air confrontations, such as Face to Face.

In 2013, TV5 introduced the Weekend Do It Better and Everyday All The Way programming blocks, but many programs were discontinued due to low ratings. In 2014, the network launched a new set of programs under the "Happy Ka Dito!" campaign.

In 2015, TV5 refocused on light entertainment, lifestyle and sports with the "Happy sa 2015" campaign, introducing over a dozen new programs. During this time, TV5's entertainment programming was produced by various content providers, including MQ Studios, Unitel Productions, Viva Television, Regal Entertainment, The IdeaFirst Company, and Content Cows Company Inc. In 2015, TV5 named Sari-Sari Channel its main entertainment production outfit after signing a deal with Viva Entertainment.

In 2016, the network aired The Walking Dead and La Reina del Sur, both dubbed in Filipino. The same year, director Brillante Mendoza collaborated with TV5 to produce made-for-TV movies under the Brillante Mendoza Presents umbrella. In 2018, he also premiered a crime drama series titled Amo.

In 2017, the network began to broadcast NFL games, which would continue until 2019. Selected local shows from the Sari-Sari Channel were also shown under the Sari-Sari sa Weekends banner. Brillante Mendoza's crime drama series Amo premiered in 2018 after a long delay.

During the COVID-19 pandemic, TV5 filled many vacant slots with new programs due to the lack of sporting events in 2020. Tierra de Reyes, Betty sa NY, Reina de Corazones, and La suerte de Loli were among the Spanish-language telenovelas dubbed in Filipino, along with the re-dubbed versions of Marimar, María Mercedes, and María la del Barrio. The network had also acquired the rights to broadcast NBA games. In August 2020, TV5 launched new local entertainment programs produced by Brightlight Productions, Luminus Productions Inc., and Archangel Media/APT Entertainment. Additional programs from Brightlight Productions were aired in October 2020.

In January 2021, TV5 and Cignal TV signed a deal with ABS-CBN Corporation to air ABS-CBN content on TV5. TV5 also broadcast cartoons and Japanese animated series that previously aired on ABS-CBN.

In June 2023, the trio of Tito Sotto, Vic Sotto, and Joey de Leon (TVJ) signed a deal with MediaQuest after leaving TAPE Inc. and GMA Network due to a dispute. On July 1, they launched their noontime show E.A.T. on TV5, which was later renamed Eat Bulaga!. The show took the slot formerly occupied by a simulcast of ABS-CBN Studios' It's Showtime, which moved to GTV in July 2023, GMA Network in April 2024, and All TV in June 2024.

In October 2023, TV5 President Guido Zaballero announced that the broadcast of the PBA games would be transferred to A2Z, later, to TV5's sister channel RPTV (through a partnership with Nine Media and RPN) in February 2024, with the change in TV5's programming to focus more on entertainment and news programs.

== Broadcast stations ==
TV5 operates its local owned and operated or affiliate television stations across 21 key areas in the Philippines, including its flagship DWET-TV (TV5 Manila). The network has six owned and operated relay stations and twelve affiliate relay stations. It had originating stations in Cebu and Davao until they were shut down and converted into relay stations or semi-satellites.

| Callsign | TV | Transmitter location |
|---|---|---|
| DWET | 5 (analog)*; 18/51 (Note: Flagship television station with digital Mirror feed in Antipolo, Rizal.) (digital) | Quezon City |
| DWTE | 2 (analog); 18 (digital) | Laoag, Ilocos Norte |
| DZET | 28 (analog); 51 (digital) | Mt. Santo Tomas, Benguet |
| DYTE | 32 (analog); 18 (digital) | Bacolod |
| DYET | 21 (analog); 18 (digital) | Cebu City |
| DXTE | 21 (analog); 18 (digital) | Cagayan de Oro |
| DXET | 2 (analog); 18 (digital) | Davao City |
| DXER | 12 (analog); 18 (digital) | General Santos |
| PA | 22 (analog); 18 (digital) | Butuan |

Affiliate stations

| Callsign | TV | Transmitter location |
|---|---|---|
| PA (Note: Owned by Interactive Broadcast Media, Inc.) | 39 (analog); 18 (digital) | Tuguegarao |
| DWDH (Note: Owned by Cignal TV, Inc. (Mediascape, Inc.)) | 25 (analog); 18 (digital) | Santiago, Isabela |
| PA | 24 (analog); 18 (digital) | Capas, Tarlac |
| PA | 28 (analog); 18 (digital) | Olongapo |
| PA | 30 (analog); 51 (Note: Owned by the network's namesake corporate parent) (digital) | Mt. Banoy, Batangas |
| PA | 34 (analog); 18 (digital) | San Jose, Occidental Mindoro |
| DWDD (Note: Owned by Nation Broadcasting Corporation) | 29 (analog); 18 (digital) | Puerto Princesa |
| DWLV (Note: Owned by Bicol Broadcasting System, Inc.) | 2 (analog) | Naga, Camarines Sur |
| DWNA | 22 (analog) | Naga, Camarines Sur |
| PA | 41 (analog); 18 (digital) | Kalibo, Aklan |
| DYMB | 36 (analog); 18 (digital) | Jordan, Guimaras |
| PA (Note: Licensed Palawan Broadcasting Corporation and operated by Prime Media Services) | 40 (analog) | Tacloban |
| DYPR (Note: Owned by Philippine Collective Media Corporation) | 50 (digital) | Tacloban |
| DXGB (Note: Owned by Golden Broadcast Professional, Inc.) | 11 (analog); 51 (digital) | Zamboanga City |
| PA | 18 (digital) | Zamboanga City |

*Analog broadcast will set to shut off on November 22, 2026 in compliance with NTC's memorandum circular.

== International broadcast ==
TV5 has international programs through the Kapatid Channel in various regions including the Middle East, North Africa, Europe, Canada, and the United States.

== Controversies ==
=== Lawsuit by GMA Network ===
In December 2008, GMA Network, Citynet Television, and ZOE Broadcasting Network filed a lawsuit against ABC, MPB, and MPB Primedia, alleging that TV5's lease of airtime to Media Prima was an attempt to circumvent regulations on foreign ownership of broadcasting companies. In response, ABC's media relations head, Pat Marcelo-Magbanua, defended the network, stating that it was a Filipino company that complied with local regulations.

=== Investment briefing with ABS-CBN deal ===
In June 2022, ABS-CBN engaged in advanced talks with MediaQuest Holdings, TV5's parent company, to explore a potential partnership. This came after Advanced Media Broadcasting System, backed by the Villar Group, acquired ABS-CBN's former frequency and launched the All TV 2, which would eventually simulcast several programs produced by ABS-CBN nearly two years later. On August 10, 2022, ABS-CBN and MediaQuest Holdings signed a convertible note agreement for ABS-CBN's investment in TV5 Network, acquiring 34.99% of the company's common shares with an option to increase the stake to 49.92% within the next eight years. MediaQuest Holdings remained the controlling shareholder with 64.79% of TV5's common shares. Additionally, MediaQuest Holdings acquired a 38.88% minority stake in ABS-CBN's cable TV arm, Sky Cable Corporation, through Cignal TV, with an option to acquire an additional 61.12% of Sky Cable shares within the next eight years. The partnership agreement was terminated on September 1 of that year following concerns from politicians and government agencies.

=== Sexual abuse lawsuit ===
In August 2024, TV5 conducted a criminal inquiry regarding the alleged sexual harassment complaint by a 22-year-old talent researcher who worked for the program Budol Alert against a News5 program manager, Cliff Gingco, which happened at a hotel in Pasig on July 23. TV5 released a "Notice to Explain" after Senator Raffy Tulfo's discussion on Wanted sa Radyo and Raffy Tulfo in Action regarding the previous reports to the Ortigas Police sub-station, TV5's executives, and the HR management. TV5 dismissed Gingco from the service.
