= Happy Belly (TV series) =

- Genre: Sitcom
- Created by: Andrea Teo
- Written by: Simmon Tan
- Starring: Lim Kay Siu; Anna Lin Ruping; Lee Weng Kee; Benedict Goh; Melody Chen; Darryl David; Jamie Lee; Craig Teo; Adrian Jay Lim
- Theme music composer: Nicholas Lim
- Country of origin: Singapore
- Original language: English
- No. of seasons: 1
- No. of episodes: 17

Production
- Executive producer: Andrea Teo

Original release
- Network: TCS Channel 5
- Release: May 7 – August 27, 1996

Happy Belly was a Singaporean English-language sitcom. The series stars Lim Kay Siu, Anna Lin Ruping, Lee Weng Kee, Benedict Goh, Melody Chen, Darryl David, Jamie Lee, Craig Teo and Adrian Jay Lim. It was also one of the least popular sitcoms in the 1990s besides My Grandson, the Doctor and Can I Help You?. It also features the creators, producers, directors and scriptwriters from the popular and award-winning Singaporean local sitcom Under One Roof.

== Cast ==
- Lim Kay Siu as Chef Wong San Hoi, Mei Kwei's husband and Johnny's elder brother-in-law, and also Chee Keong and Tracy's father
- Anna Lin Ruping as Chow Mei Kwei, San Hoi's wife and Johnny's elder sister, and also Chee Keong and Tracy's mother
- Lee Weng Kee as Johnny Chow, San Hoi's younger brother-in-law and Mei Kwei's younger brother, Chee Keong and Tracy's uncle and also the manager of Happy Belly restaurant
- Benedict Goh as Wong Chee Keong, San Hoi and Mei Kwei's son
- Melody Chen as Tracy Wong, San Hoi and Mei Kwei's daughter
- Darryl David as Ming, the waiter and drinks/beer promoter of Happy Belly restaurant
- Jamie Lee as Mona, the waitress and drinks/beer promoter of Happy Belly restaurant
- Craig Teo as Eldon, San Hoi's 1st employee kitchen boy
- Adrian Jay Lim as Antonio, San Hoi's 2nd employee kitchen boy

== Reception ==
Kevin Sullivan of The Business Times praised the characters, the performances, the production standards, the theme music and the set design, but criticsed the script, which he described as the series' "weakest thing".

In a review of the first episode, Carol Leong of The New Paper wrote that the series is "too cluttered, with too many distractions going on". She also criticised the performances of Lim Kay Siu, Teo and Adrian Jay Lim, while praising the performance of Goh.
