= Mediacorp Studios =

Singaporean production company

- Type: Division
- Industry: Television production; Filmmaking; Broadcast syndication; Distribution
- Predecessor: SBC Entertainment Productions 5
- Founded: 1 August 1999; 27 years ago
- Founder: Mediacorp
- Headquarters: Singapore, Singapore
- Products: Television programs; Motion pictures
- Parent: Mediacorp
- Divisions: Mediacorp Eaglevision
- Website: www.mediacorp.sg

Mediacorp Studios is a Singaporean production company owned by Mediacorp that produces original programming for its channels. It was established in 1999 with the creation of a unit grouping its production studios.

== History ==
SBC initially operated SBC Entertainment Productions 5, which produced content for Channel 5, in both English and Malay languages. In 1993, its controller was Anwar Rashid. The unit was renamed TCS Production 5 in 1994, managed by vice-presided by Kenneth Liang. The unit produced the channel's local sitcoms and talk show of the 1990s, including Under One Roof, Phua Chu Kang Pte Ltd, Happy Belly, My Grandson, the Doctor, Can I Help You? and Ja's Court, respectively.

On 1 August 1999, MediaCorp Studios was created as a strategic business unit in the new MediaCorp conglomerate. The unit was presided over by Lee Cheok Yew, who was the chief executive of TCS. Lee was replaced by Franklin Wong, formerly of Hong Kong broadcaster Asia Television. He planned to improve production quality, aiming to be the best in Asia. The company primarily exported to mainland China, Hong Kong and Taiwan where its shows gained higher revenue.

A block of MCS titles premiered in 2009 on TV5. As of 2024, Mediacorp still sold titles to various Philippine television broadcasters; the latest is Third Rail, which aired on GMA Network.

A Malaysian subsidiary, Mediacorp Studios Malaysia, opened in 2009, producing shows for NTV7. Among of its projects were the Malaysian sequel of Phua Chu Kang Pte Ltd, which gained a second venue on Channel 5 in Singapore, as well as Kampong Ties, which also gained a second venue on Channel 8 there.

On 2 December 2024, Mediacorp Studios began leasing ABS-CBN Corporation-owned property, ABS-CBN Soundstage at the Horizon IT Park, San Jose del Monte, Bulacan, Philippines, to increase its global footprint.
