= Koh Chieng Mun =

Singaporean actress (born 1960)

- Born: 16 December 1960 (age 65); Colony of Singapore
- Other names: Xu Jingwen
- Occupations: Actress; comedian
- Years active: 1990s–present

Chinese name
- Traditional Chinese: 許靜雯
- Simplified Chinese: 许静雯
- Hanyu Pinyin: Xǔ Jìngwén

Koh Chieng Mun (born 16 December 1960) is a Singaporean actress and comedian. She is best known for her role as Dolly Tan on the English-language popular and award-winning Singaporean local sitcom Under One Roof. In 2018 she was cast in the American romantic comedy-drama film Crazy Rich Asians.

== Early life ==
Koh is the third of four children. She grew up in Outram Park, Singapore.

== Career ==
In the 1990s, Koh played the role of Miss La La on The Ra Ra Show, marking her first collaboration with Andrew Lim. From 1995 to 2003, she portrayed Dolly Tan on the English-language popular and award-winning Singaporean local sitcom Under One Roof, marking her second collaboration with Andrew Lim after The Ra Ra Show and first collaboration with Moses Lim and Nicholas Lee, and had the opportunity to work with Hong Kong comedian named Richard Ng as well, who only appeared in Seasons 5 and 6 of the sitcom. From 1996 to 1997, she portrayed Iris Wee in another less popular sitcom known as My Grandson, the Doctor, in which she collaborated with Lee again where they also portrayed mother and son respectively just like Under One Roof. In 1998, she played Mrs. Chan Ai Ling in the film That's the Way I Like It. From 2001 to 2005, she was cast as Ronda Chieng on the television sitcom Living with Lydia, in which she collaborated with Lim again for the second time where he would appear in certain episodes of the sitcom which happened after Under One Roof, and also having the opportunity to work with another Hong Kong comedian named Lydia Shum as well. In 2003, she was cast as Betty in the comedy film City Sharks, in which she collaborated with Lee again for the third time after Under One Roof and My Grandson, the Doctor. In 2005, she performed in Toy Factory's stage production 10 Brother. She also worked as a radio host for Symphony 92.4FM, marking her third collaboration with Andrew Lim after Under One Roof and The Ra Ra Show.

In June 2014, she performed with the theatre company Generasia in Women of Asia, a live production at LASALLE College of the Arts.

In early 2018, it was announced that Koh would be joining the cast of Toggle's original series Dance With Me. Koh was also cast as Neena Goh in the American romantic comedy-drama film Crazy Rich Asians, based on the novel of the same name by Kevin Kwan. She was the only cast member to speak in Singlish in the film.

== Personal life ==
In October 2005, Koh was diagnosed with breast cancer, with tumors in her breasts and her left kidney. Both tumors were successfully removed during a surgical procedure on 11 November 2005. She is now cancer free, and is a spokesperson for the Singapore Cancer Society.

She is a practicing Roman Catholic.

== Filmography ==
=== Film ===
Year	Title	Role	Notes	Ref
1995	Cupid Love	Deng Xiaoling	Telemovie	
1998	Forever Fever	Chan Ai Ling		
2003	City Sharks	Betty		
2018	Crazy Rich Asians	Neena Goh		

=== Television series ===
Year	Title	Role	Notes	Ref
1990	The Ra Ra Show	Miss La La	First collaboration with Andrew Lim	
1995-2003	Under One Roof	Dolly Tan	Second Collaboration with Andrew Lim; First Collaboration with Moses Lim and Nicholas Lee; First and Only Collaboration with Richard Ng	
1996-1997	My Grandson, the Doctor	Iris Wee, Dr. Benedict Wee's Mother	Second Collaboration with Nicholas Lee	
2001-2005	Living with Lydia	Ronda Chieng	Second Collaboration with Moses Lim; First and Only Collaboration with Lydia Shum	
2001	Pavilion of Women	Ying		
2001	The Reunion	Tan Shuilian		
2006	Maggi & Me	Jenny Ban		
2017	BRA	Madame Sophia		
2018	Dance With Me			

== Awards ==
- Star Awards 2002 Top 10 Most Popular Female Artists
