= Twilight Kitchen =

- Directed by: Gerald Lee
- Starring: Moses Lim; Tang Miao Ling; Zhang Xinxiang; Chen Jian Hu; Zhou Shi Min; Hong Pei Xin
- Production company: Gateway Entertainment
- Release date: 12 July 2003
- Running time: 89 minutes
- Country: Singapore
- Language: Chinese
- Box office: $250,000

Twilight Kitchen (Chinese: 聚味楼) is a 2003 Singaporean "community" film directed by Gerald Lee. The film was initially only meant to encourage companies to employ ex-prisoners. It was the first "community film" in Singapore. It was also the first time a film directed by Lee was screened in local theatres.

== Plot ==
Mai Zhi Hao, an ex-offender, seeks a second chance at life, and is offered work at the 'Twilight Kitchen' restaurant, having learnt to cook in prison.

== Cast ==
- Moses Lim
- Tang Miaoling
- Zhang Xinxiang
- Chen Jian Hu
- Zhou Shi Min
- Hong Peixing
- Zhu Houren

== Release ==
The film was originally meant to be released straight-to-VCD in 2003. However, after receiving praise, the film was instead given a theatrical release from 17 July to 30 July in two theatres, and premiered on 12 July in the Singapore Botanic Gardens, with the guest of honour being Tan Choo Leng, the wife of the Prime Minister of Singapore Goh Chok Tong.

== Reception ==
Lee Yiyun of Lianhe Zaobao rated the film C+ for entertainment and C for art, while Hong Minghua of Lianhe Zaobao rated the film C+ for entertainment and C− for art. Chen Yunhong of Shin Min Daily News gave the film three stars out of five. Hong Ai Li of The Straits Times praised the performances of Zhang and Lim, while criticising the conclusion for being predictable.
