= City Sharks =

- Directed by: Esan Sivalingam
- Written by: Esan Sivalingam
- Starring: Sheikh Haikel; Nicholas Lee; Hans Isaac
- Cinematography: Jamal J. Farley
- Edited by: Bin Li
- Music by: Don Richmond
- Production companies: Hoods Inc. Productions; Nexus Net
- Release date: 27 March 2003
- Running time: 90 minutes
- Country: Singapore
- Language: English
- Budget: $650,000

City Sharks is a 2003 Singaporean comedy road film directed by Esan Sivalingam, starring Sheikh Haikel, Nicholas Lee and Hans Isaac. The film was shot from October 2001 to January 2002, during which a monsoon destroyed a key location. Sivalingam filed two lawsuits against Malaysian production house Gambar Tanah Licin for refusing to release the film. The first lawsuit, which was quickly settled out of court, was for the production house refusing to release the film. The second lawsuit, which ended in January 2003 and resulted in him being awarded $310,000, was for financial mismanagement.

== Cast ==
- Sheikh Haikel as Jeff
- Nicholas Lee as Mike Wong
- Hans Isaac as Chief
- Koh Chieng Mun as Betty
- Corinne Adrienne as Sherry
- Lim Kay Tong as Samuel
- Moses Lim as Henry Seow
- Marcus Chin as Ang
- Chan Chee Wai as Hock
  - Leslie Low as Hock (voice)
- Afdlin Shauki as Zul
- Michelle Saram as Deanna
- Adam Corrie as Jimmy
- Keagan Kang as Al/Alex
- Vernetta Lopez as Bag Woman
- Kher Cheng Guan as Big Boss
  - Adrian Pang as Big Boss (voice)
- Zaibo as Farmer

== Release ==
The film premiered at the Beach Road cineplex on 17 March 2003. It opened in theatres on 27 March.

== Reception ==
Jeanmarie Tan of The New Paper rated the film 3 stars out of 5 and wrote, "At turns funny, poignant and dealing with feel-good themes of family and belonging, City Sharks is one gamble that does pay off."

Clarissa Oon of The Straits Times rated the film 3 stars out of 5 and wrote that Farley's "evocative" cinematography and Richmond's "eclectic" and "pulsating" soundtrack "lifts the film above other formulaic homegrown English-language comedies like One Leg Kicking and Chicken Rice War", and praised the performances of Sheikh, Lee, Isaac, Lim, Koh and Kang.

Yong Shu Chiang of Today wrote that while the film "lacks bite in its dialogue, has so-so acting and could have benefited from a more polished script", it "has its moments".
