= Sheikh Haikel =

Singaporean rapper, singer, actor, comedian and radio personality

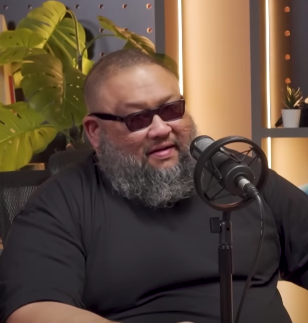
- Sheikh Haikel in 2024
- Born: Sheikh Haikel bin Sheikh Salim Bajrai; 10 October 1975 (age 50); Singapore
- Occupations: Rapper, businessman, singer, actor, comedian, radio personality
- Years active: 1991–present
- Spouse: Anna Belle Francis (m. 2002)
- Children: 3
- Awards: 1991 Asia Bagus winner
- Musical career
- Genres: Hip hop
- Website: www.sheikhhaikel.com

Sheikh Haikel bin Sheikh Salim Bajrai (Arabic: شيخ هيكل شيخ سليم Šayḫ Haykal Šayḫ Salīm, born 10 October 1975) is a Singaporean rapper, businessman, singer, actor, comedian and radio personality. He won the talent competition Asia Bagus in 1991. As a multi media personality with numerous stints in radio, television, film, and stage, he has produced three studio albums and numerous single track albums to date. He now runs a music school in Kuala Lumpur where they teach varied genres of music including, hip hop, classical, and rock.

== Early life and education ==
He attended Saint Patrick's School and has a BA in Performing Arts and Psychology from the Queensland University of Technology.

== Career ==
=== Acting ===
Sheikh Haikel first appeared on the big screen in the iconic Singaporean film, Army Daze. Army Daze made a return to the theatre in 2006 under the direction of Beatrice Chia and Goh Boon Teck, with Sheikh retaining the role of Johari Salleh. His next performance was as Jeff in the joint Singaporean-Malaysian film City Sharks in 2003 which he starred in alongside Nicholas Lee and Hans Isaac.

He has starred in many sitcoms in TV such as 3 Rooms and The Donnie Lee Show. He also guest starred various times on the critically successful Singaporean sitcom, Under One Roof. He has also hosted ESPN's Football Crazy and is currently the host of Okto's Knockout.

=== Radio ===
In 2004, complaints were made to Singapore's Media Development Authority that he and his then co-host Daniel Ong made lewd remarks on air when a teenage male listener called in for advice on how to attract a girl he liked. As a result of these complaints, Ong was suspended from on-air duties while Sheikh was asked to leave. MediaCorp Radio's 987FM was cautioned and fined S$30,000.

Sheikh Haikel was a DJ for the local broadcast channel 98.7FM, and on the Breakfast Show on channel 91.3FM in 2008.

=== Music ===
Sheikh's music is rooted in rap. He became interested in it at the age of nine, when his mother bought a Run DMC tape for him by accident, having mistaken it for a The Pips tape.

Sheikh won the Asia Bagus Grand Championship as part of the rap duo Construction Sight in 1991. Construction Sight is credited as "Singapore's first ever rap group". His first two solo albums For Sure and For Sure Too led him to win Best Local English Song at the Compass Awards in 2002 and 2004 for the hit single, Witulah. His third album 10.10.10 was released on the same date of his 35th birthday, 10 October 2010. He performed a series of songs at the President's Star Charity 2012.

=== Business ===
In February 2017, seven years after convincing the founders of Fatboys The Burger Bar - together with his wife Anna Belle Francis, friends, inclusive Singaporean deejay duo The Muttons - launched FatPapas Burgers and Shakes; which is marketed as a halal subsidiary of the aforementioned Fatboys.

In July 2024, Haikel together with his wife Anna Belle Francis and 5 business partners, launched a 50-seater "Hai Ge Ji Hainanese chicken rice" restaurant at Bugis. He also co-owns halal yakiniku joint Wakuwaku Yakiniku.

== Personal life ==
Sheikh Haikel is a Singaporean of mixed Malay Yemeni descent. He has one sister. He is married to Singaporean actress Anna Belle Francis since 2002. They have three children – Triqka (born 2004), Abbra (born 2006) and their most recent, Sheikh Juz (born 2014).

In November 2010, Sheikh started a feud with Korean boy band U-KISS as they allegedly bullied him backstage at a concert in Bedok Reservoir. After the event, Sheikh posted on Twitter, "U- Kiss my ass!!!". Although he did not elaborate on what ignited the feud, he also tweeted: "All u-kiss fans were to [sic] busy to notice anything else. I was to [sic] busy trying to get u-kiss on stage." After another few tweets targeted towards U-KISS and their fans, Sheikh apologised for his banter on Twitter.

In September 2026, Sheikh revealed that he has stage 4 colon cancer, which has spread to his liver.

== Discography ==
=== Solo albums ===
- For Sure (2002)
- For Sure Too (2003)
- 10.10.10 (2010)
- Eh Lah (2011; one track album promoting his upcoming album, Check, Check, 1–2, 1–2)
- Check, Check, 1–2, 1–2 (TBA)

=== Singles ===
- "Witulah" (With u lah) (Peaked at No. 1 on Malaysian music charts)

== Filmography ==
Year	Work	Role	Notes
1996	Army Daze	Johari Salleh	
1997, 2001, 2003	Under One Roof	Johari Hassan	
2003	City Sharks	Jeff	
2006	Stories of Love: The Anthology Series	Fakri	TV movie
2010	Knockout	Host; Himself	
2011	Zero Hero	Pretty Boy One	
2014	Gerak Khas	Syed Jamal/Jimmy	Malaysian TV series Special participant
