= Living with Lydia =

- Created by: Jennifer Tan
- Starring: Lydia Shum; Samuel Chong; Ng Hui; Terence Tay; Joel Chan; Cassandra See; Koh Chieng Mun; Suhaimi Yusof; Moses Lim
- Country of origin: Singapore
- No. of episodes: 52 (list of episodes)

Production
- Running time: 30 minutes

Original release
- Network: MediaCorp Channel 5 (2001–2005)
- Release: November 8, 2001 – February 8, 2005

Living with Lydia (Chinese: 肥姐驾到 in Singapore and 肥肥一家亲 in Hong Kong) was a Singaporean-Hong Kong sitcom created by Jennifer Tan and ran from 8 November 2001 to 8 February 2005.

== Plot ==
Lydia Lum/Lydia Woo, a popular Hong Kong restaurateur/caterer and widowed mother to two children – 14-year-old daughter Apple Lum and 10-year-old son Jordan Lum – are forced to relocate when her dim sum establishment is hit with a case of food poisoning after she hosted an event and is ordered by the authorities to close her business (she is labeled "dim sum killer" by her former patrons, even though she is unaware that someone falsely accused her so they could force her out of business).

This new locale happens to be Singapore. This is because her late paternal grandfather's best friend (referred to as Ong Ah Kong) had written a will giving her half-ownership of the semi detached house he had built thanks in part to his success in the seafood business – as well as the fact Ong Ah Kong's life was saved decades before by Lydia's late paternal grandfather.

However, when she arrives at the semi detached house, it is already occupied by Ong Ah Kong's paternal grandson Billy B. Ong (Billy Boy Ong), who Lydia calls "Billy Bong". Billy prides his rise to the top of the ladder on promoting his company's specialty, fishballs. The presence of Lydia does not sit well with Billy at first, but he does give in because it might be the only way to get Lydia to give up her part of the house. Additionally, her dim sum business brings in customers and clients for him.

Other characters include Billy's 14-year-old son Max Ong, an aspiring anime artist and a Secondary 2 student, Ronda Chieng, Billy's assistant and secretary of Billy's owned fishball company who is trying to pursue Billy and sees Lydia's untimely arrival as a threat to her plans at winning Billy's heart, despite the fact that his wife Suzanne Ong, who ran out on him, shows up in the 3rd season. She would later eventually lose interest in Billy in the 4th and final season. Others include Sulaiman Yusof, a former stuntman and currently a maintenance man and blue-collar worker of Billy's company and Fruit Woo, an antique art dealer and Lydia's younger brother from Hong Kong.

== Cast ==
- Lydia Shum as Lydia Lum/Lydia Woo
- Samuel Chong as Billy B. Ong
- Terence Tay as Max Ong
- Ng Hui as Apple Lum
- Joel Chan as Jordan Lum
- Cassandra See as Suzanne Ong
- Koh Chieng Mun as Ronda Chieng
- Suhaimi Yusof as Sulaiman Yusof
- Moses Lim as Fruit Woo

== Production ==
During the series run, there were rumors that Shum and Chong were dating off camera, but given that Shum was 11 years older than Chong, both denied this, saying that they were friends.

=== Opening sequence ===
The entire opening sequence is animated. It starts in black and white with Billy B. Ong playing a song on the piano ("Humoresque", the series' theme song), followed by another clip of him eating a fishball. Billy then tries to push a fishball into his son Max Ong, followed by a clip of Ronda Chieng brushing her hair and then moving closer to Billy. The song then stops, and a loud sound clip of Lydia shouting "Hi, Billy Bong" is heard. Lydia and her family consisting of Apple Lum and Jordan Lum then appear and fill the screen with color. Apple and Jordan then appear, and then some final shots with the entire cast of the show, before an animated Lydia appears again beside the show's title on an orange screen and laughs.

== Episodes ==
Season	Ep #	First Airdate	Last Airdate
Season 1	13	8 November 2001	10 February 2002
Season 2	13	12 November 2002	18 February 2003
Season 3	13	30 September 2003	9 December 2003
Season 4	13	16 November 2004	8 February 2005

== Release ==
This series was also aired in the United States on The International Channel (later renamed AZN Television) from 2003 to 2004 as part of the "Asia Street" lineup. In April 2006, up until the network left the air in April 2008, AZN bought the show back and was rerunning them three times a week due to popular demand, starting with the series' fourth and final season. It was also broadcast on TVB Pearl in Hong Kong and JakTV in Indonesia.

The series was rebroadcast on Singapore's Mediacorp Channel 5 in 2008 as a tribute to Shum after she died.

=== DVD release ===
On 29 April 2008, PMP Entertainment in Malaysia released a DVD collection containing all 52 episodes, which includes subtitles in Chinese, in Region 3-formatted countries. Although the DVDs are out of print, PMP is expected to re-issue the DVDs when it becomes available.

== Accolades ==
The series was nominated in two categories at the 2003 Asian Television Awards, in which it was up for "Best Comedy Programme" and "Best Comedy Performance by an Actress" for Shum for her hilarious portrayal of the series' feisty title character. Shum won in the latter category and it was the show's only win at the event.
