= Forever Fever =

- Directed by: Glen Goei
- Written by: Glen Goei
- Produced by: Glen Goei; Jeffrey Chiang; Tan Chih-chong
- Cinematography: Brian Breheny
- Edited by: Jane Moran
- Music by: Guy Gross
- Production company: Tiger Tiger Productions
- Distributed by: Shaw Organisation
- Release date: May 28, 1998 (Singapore)
- Running time: 93 minutes
- Country: Singapore
- Languages: Singlish; Hokkien
- Budget: S$500,000
- Box office: S$800,000 (Singapore)

Forever Fever (released as That's the Way I Like It in the US) is a 1998 Singaporean musical comedy film written and directed by Glen Goei. It stars Adrian Pang as a man who becomes interested in disco once he sees Saturday Night Fever. As he competes in a local disco contest, John Travolta's character enters the real world and gives him advice. The film was released internationally by Miramax and was the first Singaporean film to perform well internationally.

== Plot ==
In 1977, Ah Hock, a supermarket employee in his 20s, desires to buy a new motorbike, though he does not have enough money. When Saturday Night Fever is released in Singapore (under the title Forever Fever), he is inspired to enter a dance contest to raise the money. Guided by his heroes, John Travolta and Bruce Lee, Hock competes in the contest and fights against local bullies.

== Cast ==
- Adrian Pang as Ah Hock
  - Ronald Chong as Young Ah Hock
- Medaline Tan as Ah Mei
- Anna Belle Francis as Julie
- Pierre Png as Richard
- Steven Lim as Boon
- Westley Wong as Bobby
- Alaric Tay as Ah Seng
- Caleb Goh as Leslie/Ah Beng
- Dominic Pace as John Travolta
- Pam Oei as Mui
- Lim Kay Siu as Father
- Margaret Chan as Mother
- Lily Siew Lin Ong as Grandmother
- Kumar as Tranny/Larry/Host
- Lim Kay Tong as Mr Tay
- Koh Chieng Mun as Mrs. Chan Ai Ling
- Jason Lam as Motorbike Salesman

== Production ==
After experiencing difficulty as a theatre director in the UK, director Glen Goei taught a course on film at New York University. From this experience, he became interested in directing his own film. After a project failed in London, he wrote his own script and moved back to Singapore to produce it. The Singaporean film industry was not well-established, and Goei had to rely on friends, such as actress Tan Kheng Hua, who served as casting director. To help finance the film, Goei had to mortgage his London apartment. He later described his behavior as naive, as he took major risks, such as licensing expensive pop songs. The songs paid off, however, when Harvey Weinstein of Miramax cited the music as a reason why he connected with the film and picked it up for international distribution.

== Release ==
Forever Fever grossed S$800,000 in Singapore, where it was released in 1998 by Shaw Organisation. After retitling it That's the Way I Like It, Miramax released it in the US on 15 October 1999, and it grossed US$19,319. Forever Fever was the first internationally successful Singaporean film. China on Screen authors Chris Berry and Mary Ann Farquhar attribute this to its mix of Eastern and Western values, symbolized by the use of both Bruce Lee and John Travolta as Ah Hock's heroes.

== Reception ==
Rotten Tomatoes, a review aggregator, reports that 47% of 15 surveyed critics gave the film a positive review; the average rating is 5.7/0. Metacritic rated it 52/100 based on 18 reviews. Derek Elley of Variety described it as "a cheeky and thoroughly engaging riff on Saturday Night Fever that even manages to wear some smart subtext beneath its tight pants". David Noh of Film Journal International called it a ripoff of Saturday Night Fever that is "an Asian equivalent for 'Uncle Tom-ing'". Roger Ebert of the Chicago Sun Times rated it 3/4 stars and called it "a funny homage". Lawrence Van Gelder of The New York Times wrote that the film's affection "amounts to recycling rather than reinvention". Kevin Thomas of the Los Angeles Times called it "a tale that's sweet-natured, funny and surprisingly touching". Thomas also describes the film's use of American music as empowering to Singaporean citizens rather than a form of imperialism. Writing of the film' homage, Steve Daly of Entertainment Weekly rated it C− and wrote, "Despite the America-friendly 'Singlish' dialogue, which requires only occasional subtitles, the conceit doesn't export well."

Producer Jason Blum is a fan of the film.
