= Anna Belle Francis =

Singaporean entertainer and singer

Anna Belle Francis (born 1978) is a Singaporean entertainer and singer. First emerging into the entertainment scene as a young child, Francis has a prolific portfolio, having recorded many songs and produced and starred in many films and plays.

== Early life ==
A Eurasian, Francis was born 1978 in Singapore, to "a family with a strong and popular musical background". Her father was a drummer. Her aunt, Irene Francis was a well known singer in the 70's and 80's including her uncle, Stephen Francis, a pianist till today. She grew up watching her family perform on TV and stage. She is of Peranakan plus British descent through her grandmothers.

== Career ==
As a young child, Francis started out her entertainment career as a theatrical actor with Act 3, Singapore's first Theatre for Children. She then started embarked onto the Screens when she hosted her debut TV show, Vidz, where she presented music videos and interviewed international artistes. She then started acting in TV series and sitcoms such as Triple Nine, Growing Up, Three Rooms and many others. She also was in the feature film Forever Fever by Glen Goei.

Among other projects, she starred as a girl whose husband has been chosen for her in the Peranakan stage play Bedrooms from late November to mid-December 2009 and other stage performances including "Love Pukes".

Francis took time off from acting apparently to focus more on her first two children. In 2004, however, she founded the performing arts institution Trinaqi and later coestablished Soul Theory Studios, a hip-hop academy and movement, with her husband Sheikh Haikel.

She has also produced a handful of projects and events with the National Arts Council and People's Association including Dick Lee's Euranasia Concert.

Francis has hosted many high-profile events such as the 2007 National Day Parade and the 2010 Youth Olympic Games. With her husband, she hosted Knockout, Knockout All-Stars and Knockout Carnival, all of which were broadcast on Okto.

She is co-director of the School of Music Singapore, which was founded in 2013, alongside her husband. As a professional singer, Francis has recorded numerous tracks, plenty of which are duets with her husband.

== Personal life ==
Francis married Singaporean rapper, radio personality and actor Sheikh Haikel in around 1999. They have three children – one daughter Triqka (born 2004) and one son Abbra (born 2006) and just recently, a new addition to their family, Juz (born 2014).
