= Benedict Goh =

Singaporean businessman, actor and host

- Born: 1969 or 1970 (age 55–56); Singapore
- Education: St. Gabriel's Secondary School; National University of Singapore
- Occupations: Actor; host; businessman
- Years active: 1990s−present
- Spouses: a flight attendant (m. 2004; div. 2009) Bib Sirisambhand (m. 2022)

Chinese name
- Traditional Chinese: 吳偉傑
- Simplified Chinese: 吴伟杰
- Hanyu Pinyin: Wú Wěijié

Benedict Goh Wei Cheh (born in 1969 or 1970) is a Singaporean businessman and a former actor and host. Goh placed fourth at the 2nd edition of Manhunt International in 1994 and is best known for hosting The Pyramid Game from 1995 to 1997. He also has had starring roles in the Mediacorp television series Growing Up, Mind Games, Happy Belly (1996), Rising Expectations (1997), On The Frontline (2000), The Greatest Love of All (2007), The Peak (2007) and The Ultimatum (2009), as well as in the 1995 film Bugis Street.

== Early life ==
Goh attended St. Gabriel's Secondary School and earned a bachelor's degree in Civil Engineering from the National University of Singapore in 1994.

== Corporate career ==
Goh left Television Corporation of Singapore as a full-time artiste in 1998. He moved to the corporate sector and became the deputy chief operating officer of an interior design firm called Fide Living and is also an occasional emcee for private events. In 2015, it was reported that he was working as a representative for various Swiss skincare brands.

In November 2020, Goh founded the green energy solutions company Electrik Holdings. He has been the chief investment officer at UTICA Solar, a solar products company, since 2019.

== Personal life ==
=== Relationships ===
Goh, then 27 years old and also a part-time insurance agent, dated actress and host Michelle Chia, then 22-year-old, for seven months in 1997. Chia told the media that they met when rehearsing for the President's Star Charity Show in March 1997. In a letter which he wrote to the media regarding the split, Goh claimed that his and Chia's busy schedules "had affected their feelings for each other".

Since November 2022, he has been married to Bib Sirisambhand, a Thai national who works in the hotel industry. He was previously married to an air stewardess from 2004 to 2009.

=== Legal issues ===
On 18 February 2004 at about 6 am, Goh who then owned a spa, was found driving under the influence of alcohol and exceeding the legal limit of alcohol by 1.5 times, along Lorong 1 Toa Payoh. Three years later in the early morning on 10 February 2007, Goh was driving along the Ayer Rajah Expressway, in the direction of Tuas, when his Chevrolet collided with a stationery car that had been involved in another accident. He later failed a breathalyser test.

In May 2007, Goh was charged in court for drink-driving twice, driving without due care, and for lying to the Traffic Police that a woman named Tan Min Yee was driving his car during the incident that occurred on 18 February 2004.

In October 2007, Goh was sentenced to three weeks' jail after pleading guilty to drink driving. He was also banned from driving all classes of vehicles for 4 years and was fined $800 after pleading guilty to another charge of colliding with a stationary vehicle. He filed an appeal immediately. Then District Judge Terence Chua responded that Goh's drink-driving offence, coupled with his previous drink-related conviction, was a "serious combination of offences".

On 30 November 2007, Goh began serving a three-week sentence for drink driving after surrendering himself in court. He had appealed against the sentence but dropped the move after a similar case was thrown out. He was released from Queenstown Remand Prison on 14 December 2007.
