= List of Living with Lydia episodes =

This is a list of episodes from the Singaporean situation comedy series Living with Lydia, which ran from November 2001 to February 2005.

== Season 1 (2001–2002) ==
- Season 1 from TVB

No.	Title	Original release date
1	"Lydia Arrives"	8 November 2001
Lydia moves into Billy B. Ong's house after coming from Hong Kong, and Billy B. Ong struggles with his lawyer to try to get rid of her. In the end, Lydia gets to stay and they split the house in half with a long strip of yellow tape that runs across the floor and dining table.
2	"Desperately Seeking Yang"	15 November 2001
Lydia seeks money, so she finds a businessman called Mr. Yang to see if he could fund her business. She fails to be able to contact him, so she goes to his office and invites him over to dinner at the house. Meanwhile, Ronda's friend Mary tries to convince Ronda not to pursue Billy by asking her to take interest in Mr. Yang instead.
3	"Chocolate"	22 November 2001
Ronda decides not to dress up for work anymore after being dumped by Mr. Yang. Meanwhile, Max has been grounded by Billy for not doing well in school. Lydia overhears them and asks Apple to help Max find some friends by taking him out with her friends to watch a Japanese anime film. Because Max knows so much about anime, Apple's friends think that he is cool and befriends him. Unfortunately, this leads Max to eating chocolate, something that he and Billy are extremely allergic to.
4	"Ronda's Party"	28 November 2001
Lydia is desperately seeking customers for her new dimsum business. She begs Ronda, who turns to her friend Vivian, who is throwing a party. Vivian agrees to pay Lydia to make 4800 dimsums in two days. Trouble strikes when Ronda accidentally makes dimsums with Max's plant fertilizer for a school project and can't remember which ones she made them with.
5	"Blackout"	4 December 2001
Apple forgets to come back in time for a family outing to the Hong Kong family association and has to stay home alone with Max. When a blackout occurs, she climbs into Max's bed and reads an anime comic with him. However, they fall asleep together and their parents return, thinking that they were having sex in the bed.
6	"Jolly Fruits"	11 December 2001
Lydia fills out numerous lucky draw tickets from a fruit company, not knowing that it was a husband-and-wife competition. When she wins and finds out she needs a husband, she drags Billy along to the company and makes the manager think that he is her husband. However, they find out that they need to star together in a promotional poster before they can claim their prize.
7	"Usha"	18 December 2001
When Lydia gets depressed, her friend Usha, a former Bollywood star actress, arrives and takes her to buy wacky clothes which Apple feels embarrassed about. She then takes her to a strip bar, where Lydia finally decides that hanging around with Usha isn't all that much fun. Meanwhile, Ronda, who thinks that Lydia is trying to steal Billy from her by acting depressed, turns Billy away from Usha.
8	"Diet"	6 January 2002
Lydia wants a job as a salesperson for a health food company, but the manager thinks that she is too overweight and wants her to buy the company's pricey diet pills or go on her own diet. Ronda steps in and gives Lydia a diet of eating only bananas, in return of $100 if she can survive two weeks on her diet.
9	"Rat"	13 January 2002
Apple discovers a rat in the bathroom, and she, Max, and Billy plan to capture it with rat traps, poison, and glue. Meanwhile, Lydia invites food critic Claire Tong over to try her dimsums so she would write an article about Lydia. However, Jordan doesn't seal the rat in a shoebox tightly enough after capturing it and lets it escape during Claire's visit. Furthermore, termites in the house escape from a hole Billy made while trying to find the termites.
10	"Billy's New Assistant"	20 January 2002
Lydia becomes Billy's assistant while Ronda goes away for a surgery. Unfortunately, she does not know how to use computers, and emails the wrong item to a customer. She then tries to stop him from reading it and deletes it in his office.
11	"Cat And Fire"	27 January 2002
When the neighbor's cat comes in and tries to eat Lydia's expensive dumplings, Billy agrees to Lydia paying the cat's medical bills as the neighbor found wounds after Lydia had tried to hit the cat earlier. They argue until they're off talking terms, while the children try to end the cold war by pretending there is a fire in the house with Jordan's exploding experiment.
12	"Brother Part 1"	3 February 2002
When Fruit Woo, Lydia's brother arrives in Singapore, Billy and Max suspect that he is not honest when they overhear one of his phone calls. Meanwhile, Ronda starts to turn her attention to Fruit which causes Billy to be angry.
13	"Brother Part 2"	10 February 2002
When Lydia finds out that Fruit owes a lot of money, she is forced to sell her half of the house to Billy and move out to Hong Kong so that she can pay back Fruit's loansharks.

== Season 2 (2002–2003) ==
Season 2 Site

No.	Title	Original release date
14	"Desperately Seeking Lydia"	12 November 2002
After Billy finds that Lydia's fishballs are good, he goes to Hong Kong in search of her. Meanwhile, Lydia, Fruit, and the children are desperately running away from the loansharks.
15	"There’s Something about Number 1"	19 November 2002
Lydia has returned to Singapore, and Billy wants to sell Lydia's fishballs. However, she can't find the "secret ingredient" that made her fishballs so nice. Meanwhile, Jordan wants to go back to his old school, but the principal won't let him.
16	"Who’s the Man?"	26 November 2002
Lydia meets a new friend, Sulaiman, while trying to find a job at a job fair. Meanwhile, Ronda tries to persuade Billy to hire a trend consultant. In the end, Sulaiman ends up getting employed by Billy.
17	"Ronda Moves In"	3 December 2002
When Rondas's flat is being renovated, she moves in with Billy and Lydia due to her getting high because of the varnish. She then tries to get Billy to marry her by showing him what housework she could do there if she was living there, including buying expensive food and ironing clothes in the middle of the night.
18	"All In A Night’s Work"	10 December 2002
Ronda comes up with a scheme to lure Billy to go on a holiday with her, and it pays off when she hears Billy talk about going on a cruise trip to Alaska. Unfortunately, when she learns that it will cost more money after she books it, Ronda discovers that she might have to compete against Sulaiman and Lydia at the Hungry Ghost Festival, where Sulaiman must perform a lobang while Lydia has to sing and dance her way to earn money at the event.
19	"Customer is the King"	17 December 2002
After Lydia is turned down for a job as a chef at a 5-star hotel, she gets a surprise offer from one of the hotel's guests who tasted her dim sums... a marriage proposal from the King of Martuba. Meanwhile, Ronda wants Billy to treat her like a personal assistant.
20	"Thank Gott!"	7 January 2003
Blurry lines ensues when a doctor mistakes Lydia's tunnel vision treatment for something else, while bicycle accident victim Ronda joins her rival in the same hospital and hopes to bring "Sexual Healing" to her attractive doctor.
21	"Where’s Wally?"	14 January 2003
A Look Who's Talking themed episode that finds Ronda trying to take care of Billy's 15-month-old nephew, only to have Lydia ending up being the nanny... and then losing the baby in the park!
22	"The Spirulina Incident"	21 January 2003
As Lydia attempts to make fishballs out of Spirulina after she suggests Billy on seeing this product as a potential to expand his business, she also has to find a way to get Jordan to eat his vegetables. Meanwhile, Max adopts a pet turtle.
23	"A Matter Of Principal"	28 January 2003
At a meet-the-principal day at Max and Apple's school, Billy and Lydia find themselves dealing with their principal, a no-nonsense army officer who is upset with Max and Apple's behaviour. But its Billy and Lydia who incurs the principal's wrath after they cause a food fight at the school.
24	"The Reunion"	4 February 2003
Jordan is unhappy that he wet his bedspread one night and tries to hide it by volunteering to do the laundry for the rest of his life. Meanwhile, Billy gets nervous about his looks because his 30th secondary school reunion is coming up.
25	"Table of Mao"	11 February 2003
Lydia and Billy discover that the family dining table might have once belonged to Chinese Chairman Mao. However, after Lydia accidentally "skins" the table while ripping off the divider, another argument arises between them.
26	"Sleeping With The Enemy"	18 February 2003
Billy discover another will that states that he has to remarry in order to keep the house, which Ronda sees as an opportunity. The children try to develop a plan to stop Lydia from losing her half of the house.

== Season 3 (2003) ==
Season 3 Site

No.	Title	Original release date
27	"The Way We Were"	30 September 2003
In this flashback episode, Lydia recalls her first visit to Singapore in 1979 in her attempt to be a "Singapore Girl"-- a flight attendant for Singapore Airlines. Unfortunately, Lydia's date was supposed to be Billy...whom she passed after leaving the club Billy entered! This too would also begin Rhonda's attempts to get Billy after he meets Suzanne at the same club as well as her first encounter with Lydia.
28	"Mrs. Billy B. Ong'"	7 October 2003
Billy's wife, Suzanne, who ran out on him and Max so she can "Find Herself," returns in this conclusion to "Sleeping with the Enemy." As a result, Billy's and Max's lives are turned upside-down as they avoid her, and Lydia and her children have to worry if they can still stay in the house, after the new will had replaced the old one.
29	"Stakeout"	14 October 2003
The Ong residence becomes a stakeout for a pair of cops, KC and Yong who are trying to bust a fencing ring next door. That is, until Lydia, Billy, Apple, Jordan and Ronda discover that Max is visiting the place. While at The Roti Prata Shop, Sulaiman encounters an old friend. Guest Stars: Laurence Pang as Yong, Rick Tan as KC, Zanberi A Patah as Hashim, Jimmy Tiu as coffeeshop man.
30	"Mahjong Queen"	21 October 2003
Lydia's Mahjong get-together takes on an unusual game plan when she ends up losing part of the house to a more skilled participant. When the player reveals a gun (which was actually a lighter in disguise), Lydia and Billy fear to report him to the police as well in phobia of being arrested for illegal gambling, leaving Billy and the player to have to challenge each other in a game of Mahjong attempting to win Lydia her half of the house back.
31	"Do The Right Thing"	28 October 2003
Lydia and Apple discovers that $80,000 (in Singapore dollar) have just been deposited into Lydia's bank account. Now the big question is do they return the cash or spend it? Meanwhile, Ronda, calling all her 32 ex-boyfriends to apologize after Sulaiman convinces her about karma, finds herself together again with one of her old boyfriends, TJ.
32	"Hard Habit to Break"	4 November 2003
When ex-smoker Lydia starts to crave another puff, its up to Apple and Jordan to get her to put the cigarettes down. Meanwhile, after Sulaiman and Apple convince Ronda that there is something wrong with TJ, she desperately tries to find out what it is about him that is amiss.
33	"Life's A Peach"	11 November 2003
When Lydia's customer Peach breaks up with her fiancee, Lydia finds that the reason is that her fiancee's mother didn't want a daughter-in-law who couldn't cook. Lydia attempts to teach Peach how to cook, but after that plan fails, she calls over the fiancee's mother to eat her cooking instead while saying it was Peach's. Complications arise when Peach and Lydia find out that the reason of her fiancee breaking up with her wasn't true. Meanwhile, Apple can't get her busy mother to help her with her school project on entrepreneurship and instead asks Ronda to assist her.
34	"Workplace Health"	18 November 2003
When Billy finds out that workplace health programs were strongly encouraged to impress an inspector, he gets Ronda to host exercise lessons. However, when she hurts the workers with excessive exercise, Lydia is hired to replace her instead. However, when she chooses to exercise during work hours, a piece of food accidentally flies into the inspector's eye!
35	"Obsessions"	25 November 2003
Max and Jordan pull a scheme on Apple by pretending that a singer that she's a fan of wants to see her. Special Guest: Roy Chiu
36	"Dotting the Eyes"	25 November 2003
When Jordan accidentally enters the Ladies Room, Lydia takes him to make new glasses. However, she doesn't want him to keep changing glasses, so she gets him to protect his eyesight--unfortunately misquoting the eye doctor and annoying Jordan as a result.
37	"Educating Lydia"	2 December 2003
Lydia is annoyed at how much her son Jordan has to learn in school as a result of preparing for his PSLE (Primary School Leaving Examination). Meanwhile, Ronda and Sulaiman go on strike after Billy turns down their demands. Then Lydia tries to start her own strike too against Jordan's school.
38	"Wrong Feng Shui"	9 December 2003
Lydia's Feng Shui techniques seem to be working in Billy's favor. Thus Lydia curses Billy with her dark arts of feng shui.
39	"Charlie's Aunties"	9 December 2003
In an episode inspired by Charlie's Angels, Suliaman tries to bankroll an action-adventure flick, but ends up with a tight shoestring budget.

== Season 4 (2004–2005) ==
No.	Title	Original release date
40	"Homecoming"	16 November 2004
Lydia, Apple and Jordan are shocked to learn that Billy's cousin has moved in with "Billy's permission". However, when Billy arrives back from vacation in Australia, it is revealed that Johnny, Billy's cousin, had moved in without permission. The plot thickens when Johnny produces a different version of their grandfather's will, stating that he owned Lydia's half of the house and attempts to chase Lydia out of the house. To stop his crude cousin from staying, Billy attempts to get rid of him by asking Ronda to date him for a night.
41	"Who Killed Johnny"	23 November 2004
After Johnny is unexpectedly found dead in the kitchen of the house, Ronda's old boyfriend (who happened to work for the CID), TJ, arrives at the house to find Johnny's murderer. Complications arise when Billy does not return to the house and when Max tries to save his father by blaming Lydia for killing Johnny.
42	"Idol Dreams"	30 November 2004
Lydia attempts to audition for Singapore Idol, but is rejected. Unfortunately, she takes one of the show's judges (and a former flame of Ronda's), Dick Lee, home with her after she accidentally knocks him out and wakes up with amnesia. Lee's fellow "Idol" judge Florence Lian also has a cameo after Billy discovers her on the couch after getting the same aforementioned treatment from Lydia.
43	"The Haunting of Lydia"	7 December 2004
After Billy rejects Lydia's offer to sell the house so she can use the money to buy a restaurant, Lydia comes up with a ghostly plot by convincing Billy that the house is haunted. But the scheme starts to really scare the wits out of Billy, resulting in an anxiety attack and he has to be hospitalized. Lydia, assuming that it was a heart attack, worries that she would be to blame and would suffer the death penalty.
44	"Miss Bing Bong Ball"	14 December 2004
Billy comes up with an idea to sell his fish balls by launching a pageant for "Miss Bing Bong Ball"...and Lydia enters the event! Billy tries to stop Lydia from winning the competition because he doesn't want people to think that people will end up looking like Lydia if they eat his fishballs.
45	"Merry Christmas Lydia"	21 December 2004
Lydia dresses up as Santa for a children's Christmas party, which clashes with Billy's interview with a magazine and Ronda and Suliman's battling for a raise. Knowing that letting children in the house would impress the magazine reporters, Ronda and Billy convince Lydia to host the party at their house, so that Ronda would win the raise. However, all goes wrong when no children show up at the house.
46	"Ants and Romance"	28 December 2004
Love is in the air for Jordan and the girl next door. Meanwhile, there's no love for Billy and Lydia when ants start crawling around the house.
47	"Potions and Superstitions"	4 January 2005
Billy receives a gift from Suzanne that brings good luck but Lydia sees it as bad luck for her. Meanwhile, Ronda steps up her attempt to win Billy.
48	"The Meaning of Life"	11 January 2005
After Lydia's friend Usha dies, Suliman suggests that she accompany him to a seminar, thanks to his girlfriend who works for a motivational speaker. But its Lydia who takes the stage when she becomes the star of the seminar and gets a book deal. Meanwhile, Billy and Ronda work on a motivational book.
49	"Lydia of The Opera"	18 January 2005
When Lydia's Chinese opera star idol, Fai Fai, shows up for a concert, everything really goes off on a sour note when Fai Fai starts offending Lydia.
50	"Masak With Lydia"	25 January 2005
Suliman gets Lydia a cooking spot on a TV show -- except it is in Malay (airing on Suria) and Lydia can't speak the language; Jordan is having second thoughts about seeing the girl (Raine) next door; Ronda wants Billy to finally notice her.
51	"Return of the King"	1 February 2005
The King of Martaba returns, only to seek refuge in the Ong residence to escape an attempt on his life from his brother. When Billy learns that he may seek a reward from him, he suggests Ronda to romance him, resulting in a marriage proposal. Meanwhile, Suliaman is offered a job at MediaCorp from his girlfriend and Billy's wife Suzanne returns with a stunning surprise.
52	"The Last Laugh"	8 February 2005
In the series' final episode, Billy learns from Suzanne that he has a daughter and reveals to Lydia that he might go bankrupt. But Lydia is in for a bigger shock when Ronda returns from Martaba with Fruit after he is caught in the King's home country for getting others to invest in a fake restaurant and is bought back before he is sentenced, leaving Lydia and Billy with no choice but to sell the house in an effort to save both the business and Fruit. The wedding between Ronda and the King takes place at the Ong residence, and it is one that none of the gang will ever forget. The series ends with the Ong residence being sold, Lydia moving to China to set up her own restaurant and Billy moving to a new apartment.
