= Daisy Irani (television personality) =

Indian-Singaporean actress

- Born: Bombay, India
- Citizenship: Singapore
- Occupations: Actress, director, producer
- Years active: 1992–present
- Spouse: Subin Subaiah
- Relatives: Roy–Joshi–Irani-Desai family

Daisy Irani Subaiah is an Indian-born Singaporean television actress, director, and producer. She is well known for her role in the 1995 TV show Under One Roof, which was the first English language Singaporean sitcom.

== Early life ==
She was born to Gujarati film actress Padmarani and stage director Namdar Irani in Bombay, India.

== Career ==
=== Early career ===
Irani was an established actress in films and theatre in Gujarati, having acted in 18 Gujarati films, several television shows, and theatre performances with the Indian National Theatre.

After she moved to Singapore, she appeared in the role of Daisy Matthews in the popular Singapore TV series Under One Roof televised in 1995.

At Mediacorp, she was the executive producer for Mediacorp Studios' English Entertainment Productions Division. In 2007, she became the head of the Central Channel's Programming and Promotions, as well as their TV12 Creative Services Division. In 2008, the Central Channel became defunct after Kids Central and Arts Central were merged to form Okto where it took over the channel space and frequency formerly used by the-defunct Channel i, and Vasantham Central became a full-fledged channel as Vasantham, occupying the original Central channel space and frequency.

=== HuM Theatre ===
In 2010, Irani founded HuM Theatre, a theatre company. In 2020, the theatre company gave Zee TV broadcasting rights to four of its plays.

In 2019, Irani produced a play, Being Mrs Gandhi, and acted as Kasturba Gandhi, the wife of Mahatma Gandhi, in celebration of the 150th anniversary of Mahatma Gandhi's birth. The production came after Irani attended a talk by Gandhi's granddaughter, Ela Gandhi, about her grandmother in 2018.

In 2021, Irani starred in a short film #MakeThatCall, about bridging an increasing physical gap between young people and aging parents.

In 2023, Irani staged We Are Like This Only 3, with cast from HuM Theatre, with Irani calling it 'unintended trilogy'. The first two plays focused on tensions between Singaporean Indians and expatriate Indians, while the third play focused on tensions between new Singaporean citizens from India and the Chinese majority.

== Personal life ==
She moved from Mumbai to Singapore in 1991 when her husband, Subin Subaiah, was posted there for work. In 2004, the couple received their Singapore citizenship.

== Filmography ==
=== Television ===
Year	Title	Role	Ref
1995 – 2003	Under One Roof	Daisy Matthews	
2006	ABC DJ		Executive Producer

=== Theatre ===
Year	Title	Role	Notes	Ref
1996	Suite Hearts		Director, producer	
2013	We Are Like This Only			
2016	We Are Like This Only 2			
2019	Being Mrs Gandhi	Kasturba Gandhi	Producer	
2023	We Are Like This Only 3			
