= My Grandson, the Doctor =

- Genre: Sitcom
- Created by: Andrea Teo
- Written by: Seah Chang Un
- Directed by: Andrea Teo; Colin Cairnes; Chong Gim Hwee; Jennifer Tan; Eunice Tan; Yong Mun Chee
- Starring: Nicholas Lee; Jacintha Abisheganaden; Michelle Goh; Susan Quah; Neo Swee Lin; Jasmin Samat Simon; Koh Chieng Mun
- Theme music composer: Nicholas Lim
- Country of origin: Singapore
- Original language: English
- No. of seasons: 1
- No. of episodes: 20

Production
- Executive producer: Andrea Teo

Original release
- Network: TCS Channel 5
- Release: October 3, 1996 – February 13, 1997

My Grandson, the Doctor was a Singaporean English-language sitcom. It starred Nicholas Lee, Jacintha Abisheganaden, Michelle Goh, Susan Quah, Neo Swee Lin, Jasmin Samat Simon and Koh Chieng Mun.

For his performance in the series, Samat won the Best Actor award for the comedy/light entertainment category at the Asian Television Awards in 1997.

== Cast ==
=== Main ===
- Nicholas Lee as Dr. Benedict Wee
- Jacintha Abisheganaden as Nurse Maureen Veerappan
- Michelle Goh as Nurse Pamela Heng
- Susan Quah as Nurse Susan
- Neo Swee Lin as Dr. Liu Su Min
- Jasmin Samat Simon as Dr. Jaafar Hussein
- Koh Chieng Mun as Dr. Benedict Wee's Mother

=== Recurring ===
- Von Leong as Li Hwa

== Reception ==
Carol Leong of The New Paper wrote that "Devotees of TCS sitcoms will enjoy the faintly absurd scenarios, the local humour and the sight of Jacintha playing it matronly."

Ong Sor Fern of The Straits Times wrote that the series has an "annoying share of well-educated actors trying to speak street English", and is "much too insipid to inspire many memories."
