= Under One Roof (Singaporean TV series) =

Singaporean TV series

- Singapore's Funniest Family
- Genre: Sitcom
- Created by: Andrea Teo; Wee Thye Seah; Simmon Tan; Seah Chang Un; Angelena Loh
- Written by: Seah Chang Un (head writer); Simmon Tan; Angelena Loh; Esan Sivalingam; Tan Wei Lyn; Joanne Teo; Lynette Chiu; Lilian Wang
- Directed by: Andrea Teo; Wee Thye Seah; Colin Caines; Gim Hwee Chong; Khairul Anwar; Jennifer Tan
- Starring: Moses Lim; Koh Chieng Mun; Vernetta Lopez; Nicholas Lee; Andrew Lim; Norleena Salim; Zaibo; Daisy Irani; Rajiv Dhawn; Selena Tan
- Country of origin: Singapore
- No. of seasons: 7
- No. of episodes: 137, including the episodes aired during Channel 5's 40th anniversary in 2003 (list of episodes)

Production
- Executive producers: Andrea Teo; Wee Thye Seah
- Running time: 30 minutes (including commercials)

Original release
- Network: MediaCorp Channel 5
- Release: 21 February 1995 – 15 July 2003

Under One Roof is a Singaporean sitcom that originally aired on Mediacorp Channel 5 from 21 February 1995 to 15 July 2003. It was the first locally produced English sitcom in Singapore. This sitcom was also a critical and popular success, and it paved the way for future Singaporean local sitcoms such as Phua Chu Kang Pte Ltd and Police & Thief. It was also one of the most popular sitcoms in Singapore just like the other 2 popular Singaporean local sitcom and drama Phua Chu Kang Pte Ltd and Growing Up respectively.

It starred a multicultural cast reflecting the ethnic makeup of Singapore: Moses Lim (Tan Ah Teck), Koh Chieng Mun (Dolly Tan), Vernetta Lopez (Denise Tan), Nicholas Lee (Ronnie Tan), Andrew Lim (Paul Tan), Norleena Salim (Rosnah Hassan), Zaibo (Yusof Hassan), Daisy Irani (Daisy Matthews), Rajiv Dhawn (Michael Matthews) and Anita Chow (Paul's love interest, girlfriend and wife) (Selena Tan).

== Plot ==
The series revolves a multiracial cast of characters. The plot tells the story of a Chinese family living at a Bishan HDB Flat at Blk 243, Bishan Street 22, Bishan North, and headed by Tan Ah Teck―the owner of a mini-mart and his family: Homemaker Dolly Tan and children Denise, Ronnie and Paul Tan ― along with their neighbours, namely married Malay couple Rosnah and Yusof Hassan, and Daisy Matthews, a lady of Indian descent, along with her younger brother Michael Matthews, where they all live in the same flat. Joining them from Season 6 onwards would be Anita Chow, Paul's love interest, girlfriend and eventual wife who moved in with the Tan family in the Bishan HDB Flat (from Ang Mo Kio HDB Flat at Blk 222 Ang Mo Kio Avenue 1 in Season 5) and living beside them with Paul after the old owner sold the flat and they managed to purchase it and live with the Tan family as neighbours together. Also, Anita's father, Bobby Chow who moved in with the Tan family after he and his daughter Anita sold the Ang Mo Kio HDB Flat and lived in Paul's room due to his apartment in Hong Kong under renovation works for the time being in Season 6, and once they are completed, he eventually returned to live in his apartment in Hong Kong. Another new neighbour joining them would be Yusof's new second wife Ramona, who remarried and lived with her new husband Yusof after Rosnah died due to overeating and choking at a buffet restaurant in London, England whilst visiting the latter and her former husband Yusof's son Johari Hassan, who also eventually returned and lived with his father Yusof after completing his studies at University of London.

== Cast ==
- Moses Lim as Tan Ah Teck, the patriarch of the Tan family and a mini-mart owner. He is prompted by any situations that occur to tell his unappreciated and seemingly irrelevant stories with the intent of teaching the other characters some moral lesson. The stories frequently begin with "This reminds me of a story! Long before your time, in the Southern province of China...". He is best friends with neighbour couples Yusof and Rosnah Hassan.
- Koh Chieng Mun as Dolly Tan, a stoic peacemaker and faithful wife of Ah Teck, and also the housewife of the Tan family. She is one of the few characters willing to sit through and even appreciate her husband Ah Teck's stories. She is best friends with neighbour couples Rosnah and Yusof Hassan.
- Vernetta Lopez as Denise Tan, the University-educated daughter of Ah Teck and Dolly, and the only sensible one in the family who tries to keep the household sane.
- Nicholas Lee as Ronnie Tan, the younger son of Ah Teck and Dolly. He is frequently skirt-chasing and is full of schemes and ridiculous ideas which irk his family, especially Ah Teck, Denise and Paul.
- Andrew Lim as Paul Tan, the elder son of Ah Teck and Dolly. He is a hypochondriac accountant who enjoys classical music.
- Norleena Salim as Rosnah Hassan, Yusof's large, sharp-tongued wife who often dominates her husband, and also Dolly and Ah Teck's best friend and neighbour of the Tan family. In the first episode of Season 6, it was mentioned that she had died from overeating and choking to death in a buffet restaurant.
- Zaibo as Yusof Hassan, a Mee Rebus seller and stall-owner of Hassan Rasa Istimewa and took over the stall from his late father and late grandfather, and also Rosnah's husband and Ah Teck and Dolly's best friend and neighbour of the Tan family.
- Daisy Irani as Daisy Matthews, a single advertising executive and also neighbour of the Tan family. She is excitable and outspoken, and constantly bickers with her younger brother Michael.
- Rajiv Dhawn as Michael Matthews, Daisy's younger brother and also neighbour of the Tan family.
- Selena Tan as Anita Chow, Paul's love interest and girlfriend in Season 5 and later eventually wife at the end of Season 5 and starting of Season 6 lasting all the way to Season 7 and the final season. She initially lives at a Ang Mo Kio HDB flat located at Blk 222 Ang Mo Kio Avenue 1 in Season 5, and eventually moves in with the Tan family from Season 6 onwards and also became neighbours because of the HDB flat beside the Tan's family flat after getting married with Paul. She is also eventually Ah Teck and Dolly's daughter-in-law and Denise and Ronnie's sister-in-law.
- Richard Ng as Bobby Chow, Anita Chow's father, Paul's uncle in Season 5 and eventual father-in-law in Season 6, and also Ah Teck and Dolly's eventual in-laws. He is a chef, travelling gourmet and food connoisseur from Hong Kong and London, England. He also moved in with his daughter Anita at the Ang Mo Kio HDB flat located at Blk 222 Ang Mo Kio Avenue 1 in Season 5, and eventually moves in with the Tan family from Season 6 and lived in Paul's room before returning back to his apartment in Hong Kong.
- Sheikh Haikel as Johari Hassan, Rosnah and Yusof Hassan's son and Ramona's stepson who studied in University of London in London, England.
- Sheila Wyatt as Ramona, Yusof's second and eventual wife after his first wife Rosnah died due to overeating and choking. She has only appeared in Season 6 thus far.

== Episodes ==
Series	Episodes		Originally released	
Series	Episodes		First released	Last released
1	16		21 February 1995	6 June 1995
2	22		9 April 1996	3 September 1996
3	20		18 March 1997	29 July 1997
4	22		25 March 1998	18 August 1998
5	36	26	6 April 1999	28 September 1999
5	36	10	4 January 2000	7 March 2000
6	9		20 February 2001	10 April 2001
7	12		29 April 2003	15 July 2003

== International Broadcast ==
The series has been exported to Malaysia, Philippines, Australia, Taiwan, France and Canada. It was the first Singaporean show to be broadcast in Australia on SBS (beginning December 1997) and Canada.

It returned briefly during Channel 5's 40th anniversary in 2003 for Season 7. The sitcom once again rebroadcast in May 2011 and broadcast on weekdays around 12pm before being dubbed into French.

In August 2009, the series was also broadcast in the Philippines on TV5 and dubbed into Filipino. It become one of the first Singaporean series to be aired on Philippine television, and in Malaysia, it was broadcast on TV3 and NTV7 along with Phua Chu Kang Pte Ltd.

In September 2011, 30 episodes of Season 1 were dubbed into French and broadcast in other countries worldwide. It became Singapore's first-ever English sitcom to be dubbed into a foreign language. Some episodes of Seasons 1 and 2 have been dubbed into French and aired in some other countries in 2011. Season 3 was then dubbed into French in early 2012.

== Reception ==
=== Usage of Singlish ===
This sitcom was notable for its characters' use of Singlish in everyday conversation. Due to its use of Singlish, the show came under pressure by the Singaporean Government to use only "proper" English. This was mainly because of the worry that the younger school going viewers would start speaking Singlish more and bring down the standard of spoken English in Singapore. Another popular Singaporean sitcom that also received similar pressure was Phua Chu Kang Pte Ltd where the main lead and title character, Phua Chu Kang, was criticised for speaking Singlish.

=== Accolades ===
It was a finalist in the "Best Sitcom" category at the International Emmy Awards as well as the New York Festivals Awards.

Organisation	Year	Category	Nominee(s)	Result	Ref.
Asian Television Awards	1996	Best Comedy Programme or Series	—N/a	Won	
Asian Television Awards	1996	Best Comedy Actor	Moses Lim (as Tan Ah Teck)	Won	
Asian Television Awards	1996	Best Comedy Actress	Koh Chieng Mun (as Dolly Tan)	Won	
Asian Television Awards	1997	Best Comedy Programme or Series	—N/a	Won	
Asian Television Awards	1997	Best Comedy Actress	Norleena Salim (as Rosnah Hassan)	Won	
Asian Television Awards	1998	Best Comedy Programme or Series	—N/a	Nominated	
Asian Television Awards	1998	Best Comedy Actor	Andrew Lim (as Paul Tan)	Nominated	
Asian Television Awards	1998	Best Comedy Actress	Norleena Salim (as Rosnah Hassan)	Won	
Asian Television Awards	1999	Best Comedy Actress	Vernetta Lopez (as Denise Tan)	Won	
