= Moses Lim =

Singaporean actor (1949–2025)

- Born: Moses Lim Aik Ming; 12 December 1949; Colony of Singapore
- Died: 11 February 2025 (aged 75); Singapore
- Education: Maris Stella High School
- Alma mater: Anglican High School; Ngee Ann Polytechnic
- Occupations: Actor; television host; comedian; food critic
- Years active: 1984–2016
- Spouse: Monica (m. 1977)
- Children: 2

Chinese name
- Chinese: 林益民
Transcriptions
Standard Mandarin
- Hanyu Pinyin: Lín Yìmín
- Website: moseslim.com

Moses Lim Aik Ming (Chinese: 林益民; pinyin: Lín Yìmín; 12 December 1949 – 11 February 2025) was a Singaporean actor, television host, comedian, and food critic, best known for playing Tan Ah Teck in the Singaporean sitcom Under One Roof (1995–2003). Together with his comedy partner, Jack Neo, they were often compared to Wang Sa and Ye Fong, a popular Singapore comedy duo in the 60s and 70s.

== Early life and education ==
Lim was born in Singapore to a businessman father and housewife mother on 12 December 1949. He had one brother and two sisters.

Of the Chinese Henghua dialect group, Lim grew up speaking Puxian Min at home. He later learned English, Malay and Mandarin from his neighbours.

Lim took his primary school education at Catholic High School, secondary school education at Maris Stella High School and pre-university education at Anglican High School. He later studied commerce at the Ngee Ann Polytechnic.

== Career ==
=== Media ===
Lim started learning crosstalk at the age of eight from a Catholic missionary priest from Harbin, China, who was also a teacher at his primary school, Catholic High School. During the early 1970s, Lim performed crosstalk at his first television appearance. While working at other jobs, Lim would take on freelance entertainment jobs with the radio stations and occasionally made a few television crosstalk appearances.

Lim met Jack Neo during a Singapore Broadcasting Corporation (SBC) variety show in 1984 and their comedic personas matched and decided to be a double act.

In 1988, they produced a comedy video movie, Fuji's Destiny (富士缘) with Neo as film director and actor, Lim and other local comedians, Marcus Chin, Hua Liang, and Tan Tiaw Gim acted in it. However, in the same year, Lim and Neo were banned by SBC for 2 years. The duo made a comeback in July 1990, hosting a comic segment Gaoxiao Xingtong in SBC's variety show, Variety Tonight on Mondays. As a result of their popularity, they went on to host Variety Tonight from February 1992 onwards. Lim also hosted a weekly comedy talk show with Neo on Radio Heart. By then, Lim and Neo were compared to Wang Sa and Ye Fong, a popular Singapore comedy duo of the 1960s and 70s, as the next most successful comic duo.

In 1992, Lim launched a book, Singapore Laughs / Smile Singapore (新加坡笑笑), containing his observations on Singapore's idiosyncrasies.

In 1994, Lim was one of the co-hosts of the multinational Asian talent program Asia Bagus along with fellow Singaporean Najip Ali. In the same year, Robert Chua, a Singaporean-born Hong Kong television producer, took note of Lim's success and invited Lim to Hong Kong to work. According to Lim, who was considered a part time actor with Television Corporation of Singapore (TCS), TCS tried to get him to sign a contract as a full time artiste which he declined due to disagreement on how management worked at TCS. Lim also claimed TCS tried to persuade him to sign a contract not to work overseas which he declined also and which he claimed resulted in TCS blacklisting him from any work with TCS. Lim eventually signed with China Entertainment Television to appear on a cooking programme and variety talk show by having the opportunity to work with Hong Kong comedian named Lydia Shum as well. Lim also later collaborated with Shum again in the sitcom known as Living with Lydia, in which Lim portrays Shum's younger brother named Fruit Woo and appeared in certain episodes of the sitcom.

In late 1994, Lim joined the Singaporean sitcom Under One Roof (1995–2003) on Mediacorp Channel 5, making him the first crossover artiste from Mediacorp Channel 8, after collaborating with Jack Neo, Mark Lee, Henry Thia, Marcus Chin, Jimmy Nah and John Cheng in Comedy Night/Comedy Nite (1990–2000, 2003–2004). Lim's famous tagline from Under One Roof is: "This reminds me of a story! Long before your time, in the Southern province of China...". For his effort in Under One Roof, Lim became the first Singaporean actor to win an award at the Asian Television Awards for Best Male Actor in a Comedy in 1996, and also had the opportunity to work with another Hong Kong comedian named Richard Ng as well, who only appeared in Seasons 5 and 6 of the sitcom.

In 2007, he played Eric Tan in the Singaporean film Just Follow Law. In 2011, Lim also starred in the Okto television series Zero Hero as Grandpa Magnificent. He performed at the 2012 stage play, Happily Ever Laughter.

In 2015, Lim starred in Our Sister Mambo, a commemorative film for Cathay Organisation's 80th anniversary.

=== Gourmet ===
Lim's gourmet career started in 1993, when a tour agency asked him to host a thematic gourmet tour, to which Lim agreed. He was the founder and manager of the Moses Lim Gourmet Club, which organizes gourmet tours on a bi-annually basis. Lim also served as brand ambassador for Singaporean porridge restaurant Zhen Zhou Dao, which was run by his son-in-law and eldest daughter. Zhen Zhou Dao eventually closed after three years of operations.

=== Other ===
In 1975, Lim's father died of a heart attack and Lim joined the automotive spare parts import-export firm which his father co-owned. Lim eventually started his own spare parts trading company.

In the 1990s, Lim had other companies which traded and market health food and premium gifts.

Lim served as chairman for a bridal store and a real estate company.

== Personal life and death ==
Lim was a Christian.

During one of his business trips while working for his own company, Lim met Monica, a Taiwanese woman. They married in 1977 and had two daughters together.

In 2018, Lim had heart surgery which was met with complications, resulting in a three-month recovery period. In 2022, he was diagnosed with a slow pulse rate and was advised to implant a pacemaker which he refused due to previous complications. A review six months later revealed his conditions were stable and his doctor agreed on not implanting the pacemaker.

Lim died on 11 February 2025, at the age of 75, of ischemic heart disease.

== Filmography ==
As Host

Year	Title	Notes	Ref.
1990–1992	Gaoxiao Xingtong	Comedy segment in Variety Tonight	
1992–1994	Variety Tonight		
1994–2000, 2003-2004	Comedy Night/Comedy Nite	Variety Tonight was renamed as Comedy Night/Comedy Nite	

Television

Year	Title	Role	Ref.
1995–2003	Under One Roof	Tan Ah Teck	
2001–2005	Living with Lydia	Fruit Woo	
2004	Family Combo	Edmund/Ah Keow	
2005	Family Combo II	Edmund/Ah Keow	
2011	Zero Hero	Grandpa Magnificent	
2013	The Recipe (回味)		

Film

Year	Title	Role	Notes	Ref.
1988	Fuji's Destiny (富士缘)		Direct-to-video	
2001	One Leg Kicking			
2003	City Sharks	Henry Seow		
2003	Twilight Kitchen			
2007	Just Follow Law	Eric Tan		
2013	Kara King			
2013	Gemeilia 2013		Cameo	
2015	Our Sister Mambo	Mr Wong		

== Awards and nominations ==
Year	Ceremony	Category	Nominated work	Result	Ref
1996	Asian Television Awards	Best Male Actor in a Comedy	Under One Roof	Won	
2001	Star Awards	Top 10 Most Popular Male Artistes	—N/a	Nominated	
2002	Star Awards	Top 10 Most Popular Male Artistes	—N/a	Nominated	
2003	Star Awards	Best Comedy Performer 最佳喜剧演员	Comedy Nite 2003	Nominated	
2003	Star Awards	Top 10 Most Popular Male Artistes	—N/a	Nominated	
2004	Star Awards	Top 10 Most Popular Male Artistes	—N/a	Won	
2005	Star Awards	Top 10 Most Popular Male Artistes	—N/a	Nominated	
