= Nicholas Lee =

Singaporean actor

Nicholas Lee (born c. 1965) is a Singaporean actor and producer best known for portraying Ronnie Tan on the popular and award-winning English-language Singaporean sitcom Under One Roof.

== Early life and education ==
Lee attended Anglo-Chinese School.

== Career ==
Lee starred as Ronnie Tan in the popular English-language local sitcom Under One Roof, which aired from 1995 to 2003. He also starred as Dr. Benedict Wee in another English-language sitcom My Grandson, the Doctor, which aired from 1996 to 1997. He then starred in the play Closer in 2000. In 1999, he also starred in the horror television series Shiver.

His contract with the Television Corporation of Singapore ended in 2000, and was not renewed. He and his friend Bernard Oh founded XXX Studios, a production company, in 2002. In 2003, he starred in the comedy film City Sharks.

In 2007, he starred in the series Random Acts. He starred in the 2008 comedy television series First Class.

He produced the television drama 2025.

== Personal life ==
He is married to Catherine Kee, a dancer and actress.

== Filmography ==
=== Films ===
- The Dead Zone (2002)
- City Sharks (2003)

=== Television ===
- Under One Roof (1995 - 2003)
- My Grandson, the Doctor (1996 - 1997)
- Shiver (1999)
- Brand New Towkay (2001)
- The Monkey King (2001)
- Stories of Love: The Anthology Series (2006)
- Random Acts (2007)
- Cosmo & George (2008)
- First Class (2008 - 2010)
- The Pupil (2011)
- Zero Hero (2011)
- Le Bisellahause (2012)
- Mata Mata (2013)
- Fableicious (2014)
- Mata Mata: A New Era (2014)
- 2025 (2015; also served as producer)
- Mata Mata: A New Generation (2015)
- Working Class (2015)
- Sunny Side Up (2022)
