= Raymond Ong =

Ong in 1995.

Raymond Ong Eng Kong (18 March 1945 – 23 July 1995) was a Singaporean civil servant, educator and amateur stage actor. He was the headmaster of Assumption English School from 1984 to 1989 and of North View Secondary School from 1992 to 1995.

== Early life and education ==
Ong was born in Singapore on 18 March 1945. His father, with whom he maintained a close relationship, was a chief driving examiner for the Traffic Police and the Registry of Vehicles. He had two brothers and two sisters. Ong was a student at the Anglo-Chinese School in the early 1960s. He then furthered his education at the University of Singapore. There, he joined the University of Singapore Students' Union and rose to become its publicity secretary. He seconded a resolution proposed in 1965 by the vice-president Tee Tua Ba to officially support the North Vietnamese government in the Vietnam War. The motion failed. In this period, he met and befriended David Gabriel, also an amateur actor, and Chan Heng Wing, who would go on to become a television presenter and producer, being closer to the latter at the time. He then continued his studies at the Teacher's Training College.

In 1974, Ong was awarded a British Council scholarship to study at the University of Essex for a master's degree in applied linguistics. He lived in Gabriel's London apartment in this period.

== Career ==
=== Acting ===
While a student at the University of Singapore in the early 1960s, Ong began his involvement with the theatrical productions of the University of Singapore Society. These were staged at the Cultural Centre Theatre. He had a leading role in a production of William Inge's Picnic in June 1963 by the recently founded Drama Group of the University of Singapore Society. He again had a leading role in the group's staging of Arnold Wesker's Chicken Soup with Barley in November 1964. He was also an active member of the Drama Society of the Teacher's Training College while studying there in the late 1960s.

Ong returned to productions by the University of Singapore Society in 1970, appeared in a leading role in the University of Singapore Society's October production of Jean-Paul Sartre's Men Without Shadows, staged together with No Exit. He played the male lead in Harold Pinter's Landscape, produced by Ranu Dally and staged by the group together with Silence, also by Pinter, in March as part of its entry for Curtain Call 1971. Merry Andrew of the New Nation felt that Ong lent "great colour and strength" to the role of Duff. In November, he starred opposite Gabriel as the titular Rosencratz in a production of Tom Stoppard's Rosencrantz and Guildenstern Are Dead. Merry Andrew was impressed by Ong and Gabriel's performances despite not being a fan of the play itself.

He portrayed the lead, John Worthing, in a production of Oscar Wilde's The Importance of Being Earnest, staged by British one-man theatre Brian Barnes at the Regional English Language Centre in August 1973. His performance was generally well received, though Violet Oon felt that Ong had rolled his eyes too much. He originated the role of the protagonist Richard Lim in the debut production of Robert Yeo's Are You There, Singapore?, staged by the University of Singapore Society in July 1974. The society's production of Bosley Wilder's Graduation, staged in May 1976, featured several "well known personalities on the Singapore theatre scene", including Ong as the lead.

Ong became involved with the Experimental Theatre Club in 1978, beginning with the club's production of A Midsummer Night's Dream staged early in the year at the DBS Auditorium as part of the Ministry of Culture's newly established Drama Promotion Scheme. The New Nation then noted that he was reputed as one of the "stalwarts of the amateur stage in Singapore." He featured in the group's first stage reading programme at the National Museum Lecture Hall.

Ong played the protagonist in the club's August presentation of Max Frisch's Andorra. Margaret Chan of the New Nation reported that his performance was generally perceived by the audience as being too over-the-top, though she felt that it could have been an "acceptable" interpretation of a character who is plagued by a "perpetual case of hysteria." Dana Lam of The Straits Times agreed, opining that the performance was "plausible" and "commendable." Conversely, Siva Arasu of The Business Times felt that Ong's performance contributed to the "frank mirth at scenes intended as poignant." This was followed in March 1979 by his appearance as Duke Orsino in the club's staging of Twelfth Night. This performance was poorly-received. He read out an excerpt from Romeo and Juliet as part of the club's Seven Ages of Man in May.

The television programme Sail Around Singapore, which aired on Channel 5 in February 1981, follows Ong and his then 12-year-old daughter as they embark on a trip round Singapore island by sailboat. He appeared as Chief Surgeon Chia Sr. in a production of Nurse Angamuthu's Romance, jointly staged in October by the Experimental Theatre Club and the English Department of the National University of Singapore as an entry to the Drama Festival. Lim Kay Tong felt that while Ong's voice was clear, though his movement was "jerky". By 1986, he had twice judged for the Drama Festival.

Ong made his comeback to the stage in a leading role opposite Koh Boon Pin in a production of Tan Tarn How's short play Two Men, Three Struggles, staged by ST*ARS in September 1987 along with seven other short plays as part of From One to Midnight. He had returned to acting on the wishes of his son, who wanted to see him act. Walton Morais of The Business Times lauded his performance, praising his intonation, the accuracy of his Singlish and his ability to "read a script without appearing to do so." John de Souza of The Straits Times had a similarly positive impression of Ong's performance.

He acted opposite his son Christopher in a production of Eleanor Wong's To Touch the Soul of God, staged at the Shell Theatrette in June 1988. This was Christopher's acting debut. Ong and his wife had initially been reluctant to allow Christopher to take the role, as his Chinese O-Level examinations were to conclude just days before the production, though they eventually relented. Weeks later, he acted opposite Gabriel for the first time since the 1971 production of Rosencrantz and Guildenstern Are Dead, with the pair taking the principal roles in a production of Eleanor Wong's Peter's Passionate Pursuit. The pair had not kept in touch for over a decade by then. Jaime Lye of The Business Times felt that Ong was miscast, and that he was unable to lend any credibility to the role. A revised version of the play was staged in Manila in August with Ong reprising the role; this was met with greater success.

Ong had a principal role in a production of Eng Wee Ling's Graveyard Shift, staged by Action Theatre in August 1989. He starred opposite Irene Lim Kay Han in the group's production of A. R. Gurney's Love Letters, which ran at the Drama Centre Theatre in March 1990. He was then the vice-chairman of the drama advisory committee. He reprised the role when the Home Nursing Foundation staged the play in November. Ong starred opposite Lim in the 1991 short film The Nose, which was directed by Ekachai Uekrongtham and premiered at the Singapore International Film Festival. His performance in the film was criticised by Jennifer Lien of The Business Times, who wrote that Ong was "stilted, especially in the interactive scenes". He appeared in a 1993 production of Desmond Sim's Drunken Prawns. He had agreed to reprise the role in late June 1995, about a month before his death.

According to academic and stage director Max Le Blond, Ong's strengths as an actor included his "very resonant, commanding" voice and his "good physical presence on stage." Uekrongtham claimed that Ong "tapped into his real-life experiences with his own family in his acting." The New Paper reported that he had received "much praise" for this style.

=== Teaching and civil service ===
Ong was an English teacher at St Andrew's School by June 1974. He taught the General Paper subject and his students included actress and writer Margaret Chan. He was teaching at St Andrew's Junior College in August 1978. Ong became the principal of the Assumption English School in 1984. He was previously a vice principal. In February, he introduced the after-school care scheme Supervised Work After School, which took in students from Primary 1 to 4 who would have otherwise spent the afternoon at home alone while their parents were away at work. He strongly objected to the use of the phrase "latchkey children" to describe such students.

Ong stepped down as principal of Assumption English School in 1989, and by November he became the assistant director of public relations at the Ministry of Education. He was appointed the principal of North View Secondary School in 1992. In July 1994, he went on a two-week "caning 'campaign'" against students who were caught outside class without permission, which he claimed was met with success. Students at North View later recalled that he would "patrol" the nearby Northpoint City mall and chastise students for not spending their free time at the mall as opposed to studying.

== Personal life and death ==
Ong married a teacher, with whom he had two children; one son and one daughter. He and his family had been living at his parents' house for nearly two decades by 1986. In 1987, he became a member of the Singapore Children's Society's appeal committee. He received the Gopal Haridas Award from the Children's Charities Association in 1992 for his fundraising work with the society. Ong died on 23 July 1995 following a short illness. He suffered from liver failure caused by acute viral hepatitis. He had developed jaundice in early in the month and was admitted to Gleneagles Hospital on 7 July. He fell into a coma three days later, regained consciousness in two, and fell into another coma a week after. The funeral, held on 26 July, was attended by over 250 students, teachers and alumni.
