= Lim Kay Tong =

Singaporean actor (born 1954)

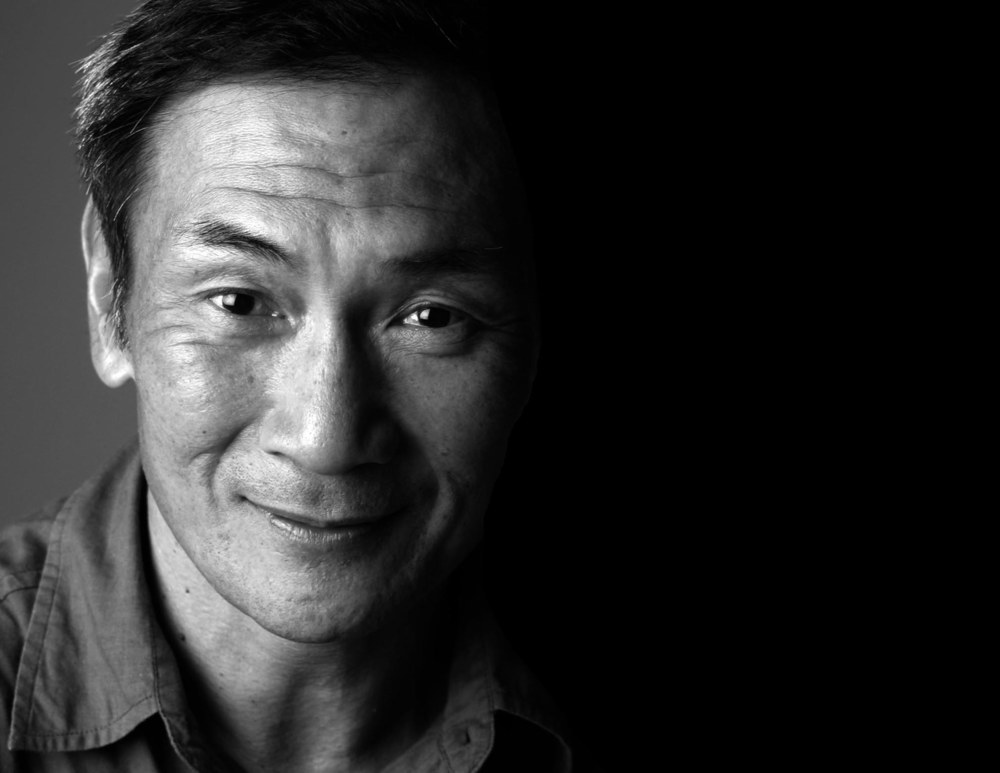
- Lim Kay Tong in Fragrant Rice (2014)
- Born: 1954 (age 71–72); Colony of Singapore
- Other name: Yiam Kong Leong
- Education: University of Hull
- Occupations: Actor; host
- Years active: 1974–present
- Agent: TheatreWorks (co-founder)
- Spouse: Sylvia Tan
- Relatives: Neo Swee Lin (sister-in-law)
- Family: Irene Lim Kay Han (sister); Lim Kay Siu (brother)
- Awards: 1982: Singapore Drama Festival Best Actor Award; 2010, 2015: Asian Television Award Best Actor in a Supporting Role; 2021: Pesta Perdana Best Actor in a Leading Role (Drama Special/Anthology); 2026: Zabaikalsky International Film Festival Best Actor

Chinese name
- Chinese: 林祺堂
- Hanyu Pinyin: Lín Qítáng
- Hokkien POJ: Lîm Kî-tông

Lim Kay Tong (born 1954) is a Singaporean film, television and stage actor. Notably, he played supporting roles in films including Shanghai Surprise (1986) and Brokedown Palace (1999), and series like Noble House (1988), and was the lead actor in Growing Up (1996–2001), Perth (2004), and The Old Man And His Car (2025). Lim has been called "Singapore's finest actor", "Singapore's best-known actor", and Singapore's answer to thespians Ian McKellen and Alec Guinness.

Lim is a co-founder and former board member of TheatreWorks. He played founding Prime Minister Lee Kuan Yew in 1965, a film that was shot to celebrate Singapore's Golden Jubilee.

== Early years ==
Growing up, Lim's parents introduced him to plays, literature, and all things artistic from the many books around their house. Lim's father, a radiologist, wanted him to become a barrister, but was supportive of his acting dreams.

Educated at Anglo-Chinese School and a boarding school in England, Lim was a national rugby player in his youth, playing the wing-forward position. While serving National Service, Lim earned a Singapore Armed Forces Colours award for his accomplishments in rugby.

In 1975, Lim moved to East Riding of Yorkshire, England, to further his education. He graduated from the University of Hull in 1978 with a Bachelor of Acts (Honours) in English and Drama, where the late Anthony Minghella was his contemporary and tutor. In 1980, he earned a diploma in Acting from the Webber-Douglas Academy of Dramatic Art in London. In England, he had several bit parts for the BBC's Doctor Who and The Chinese Detective series. In between these walk-on roles, Lim took on odd jobs like window washing, being a night janitor and washing dishes to earn extra money.

== Career ==
Lim's acting career began on the stage, when he auditioned for a production while being bored during National Service. In 1974, he starred in Robert Yeo's landmark play, Are You There, Singapore? for the Experimental Theatre Club. His other initial acting roles were in the plays Equus (1975) and Marching Song (197?) for the University Drama Society and One Mad Night (1975) for the Stage Club.

Upon his return from England, Lim played the lead role in the Experimental Theatre Club's Terry Rex (1982). The Straits Times' Minu Tharoor praised his Terry, writing, "Stage presence is too cliché a term for the imaginative energy with which Kay Tong took control of the play, the stage and his part". For his performance, Lim clinched the Singapore Drama Festival Best Actor Award.

In the same year, Lim began his career as a journalist with The Straits Times. While covering the arts, Lim continued acting in plays like David Henry Hwang's F.O.B. (Fresh Off Boat) (1982), Chandran Lingam's The Nuns (1983) and Abigail's Party (1983), for which his "marvellously taut performance" was praised by The Singapore Monitor's Yap Koon Hong.

Lim's entry into film began in 1984, when he auditioned for the New York casting agent of Year of the Dragon (1985) in Singapore. Lim was unsuccessful, but the casting agent remembered him and recommended him for Shanghai Surprise (1986). Although the film was not critically acclaimed, it gave Lim the break to star in films like Keys to Freedom (1988) and Fifty/Fifty (1992). Lim also got the role of an interrogator in Bernardo Bertolucci's The Last Emperor (1987), but had to give up the role due to a scheduling conflict.

In 1985, Lim tried his hand at directing with David Mamet's Glengarry Glen Ross, retitled Paradise Heights, for the Drama Festival. The Straits Times' Rebecca Chua found that Lim's debut as director "displayed some uncertainty". In the same year, Lim resigned from The Straits Times to set up TheatreWorks in February. TheatreWorks, the first adult professional theatre company in Singapore, was formed to "promote theatre that is relevant to Singaporeans" and create work for English-language actors. Lim served as the company's press and media relations consultant, in addition to acting in several of their plays. Lim also acted in the English-language versions of Kuo Pao Kun's influential plays The Coffin is Too Big for the Hole (1985) and No Parking on Odd Days (1986). Both productions travelled to the Hong Kong Arts Festival in 1987. Of the role he originated in The Coffin is Too Big for the Hole, Lim remembers: "For me, [a one-man show] was panic stations. I had never done a long monologue. In drama school, we had to prepare monologues based on a Shakespearean character. Nothing like this, which was 30 to 35 minutes long. And [Kuo] spent at least a couple of weeks just talking to me. I was worried. Because I thought, when is he going to get down to it?" In preparation, Kuo and Lim visited a coffin-maker and discussed the nature of funerals while Lim memorised the script.

In the late 1980s, Lim spent a few years in Los Angeles, landing roles in Off Limits (1988) and It Could Happen to You (1994). He found the city "very cutthroat and very fake. I didn't like the obsession with showbiz there. It wasn't like living a normal life in a normal city. I knew it was tough before I went, but I also knew if I stayed any longer my soul would be destroyed. The truth is that you had to be in the racial majority to get the parts." Lim also confessed that he's "not one for schmoozing. My career would have been severely hampered if I had hung out there."

Returning to Singapore for good in 1994, Lim starred in MediaCorp's award-winning TV programme Growing Up (1996–2001), set in 1960s and 1970s Singapore. His "outstanding portrayal" as the family patriarch led him to be named by The Straits Times as one of the top ten dads on TV in 2013. During his tenure on Growing Up, Lim experienced deaths in his family, which led him to reflect on his role: "You understand grief, loss, redemption, hope...It was a good time to have played that role not only for the experience as an actor, but also [its lessons in] life. If you're to be remembered for a role for the rest of your life, make the most of it." From 1999 to the early 2000s, Lim wrote a fortnightly column for The New Paper.

Lim's career-defining lead performance as Harry Lee in Perth (2004) was praised by TODAY's Ross Wallace, who wrote, "If there were any doubts that Lim Kay Tong is Singapore's finest actor, 2004's Perth should have laid them to rest...[a] towering performance". Comparing his acting to Robert De Niro and Al Pacino, TODAY also ranked his role as one of the best "male performances of the year in any genre, any country", asking, "Has there ever been a Singaporean performance that surpassed Lim's deranged taxi driver?" Neil Humphreys called Lim's "world-class performance" in Perth "almost without parallel", writing, "This is not a portrayal; it's a metamorphosis". Reflecting on his role, Lim said "it was about time. [The film] wasn't commercially successful, but the role was meaningful...I'm still adamant that I should have underplayed certain parts of Harry, but I'm sure [director] Djinn won't back down from his direction."

In 2007, Lim played the lead in The Photograph, speaking Bahasa Indonesia, a role he considers "significant" in his career. The Indonesian feature film won the 2008 Special Jury Prize at the 43rd Karlovy Vary International Film Festival. In the same year, Lim also served as a jury member of the Singapore International Film Festival. In 2010, Lim won the Asian Television Award Best Drama Performance by an Actor in a Supporting Role for his portrayal of Harris Fong in legal drama The Pupil (2010–2011). In 2013, Lim received his second The Straits Times Life! Theatre Awards nomination for Best Actor for Goh Lay Kuan & Kuo Pao Kun (2012–2013), after his first nod for The House of Sleeping Beauties (1994). The Straits Times' Corrie Tan called Lim's performance as Kuo "electrifying...Lim was an incredibly charismatic presence on stage as he breathed life into Kuo's characters. He had a very commanding presence".

In 2014, Lim starred as a fortune teller in HBO (Asia)'s original series, Grace, for which he won the Asian Television Award for Best Supporting Actor for the second time in December 2015. In October, he became the first local star to grace the cover of Esquire Singapore. In the same month, it was revealed that Lim will play founding Prime Minister Lee Kuan Yew in the upcoming film celebrating Singapore's Golden Jubilee, 1965. Lim said, "Lee Kuan Yew is a corner of the story. He frames the timeline, as to when the events take place. It is not overwhelmingly undoable, because it's just a handful of appearances stretched over the time in 1965 and maybe one other scene when he is much older. I overcame my cowardice, and said, 'Let's give it a go and see what happens.'"

In February 2015, Lim reunited with his Growing Up co-star Wee Soon Hui to play husband and wife again in the Channel 5 telemovie Love is Love: Sunset.

In July 2015, Lim portrayed Singapore's first prime minister Lee Kuan Yew in the historical film 1965, including a re-enactment of the iconic press conference when Lee announced that Singapore would be separated from Malaysia. In the same month, Lim read Lee Kuan Yew quotes, paired with music, during a one-night performance with the Singapore Chinese Orchestra.

In August 2015, Lim played the lead role in okto's TV movie, Second Chances, about a group of old folks who break out of an old folks’ home.

In early 2016, Lim played one of the lead roles, Allen, in Ying J. Tan's feature film, Rough Mix.

From 2017 to 2018, Lim worked on two Singtel advertisement campaigns. He narrated the telecommunications company's "Power On" video series in 2017, and in 2018, starred in their hit Chinese New Year short film, "Mr Lim’s Reunion Dinner". In 2020, Lim returned as the narrator of Singtel's National Day short film.

In 2019, Lim gave an acting masterclass as part of Manulife Singapore's “Stop the Drama” advertisement.

In 2021, Lim reunited with fellow cast members of Growing Up for the TV programme On the Red Dot. He re-appeared on the same show in 2025 to discuss his role in Mee Pok Man with the film's director Eric Khoo.

In 2025, Lim returned to the big screen in the lead role of The Old Man And His Car, Michael Kam's debut feature that premiered at the Tokyo International Film Festival. Lim plays Hock, a widower who has to part with his beloved car before moving to Canada. "Onscreen nearly every moment," he was praised for his "quietly intense performance" and "carrying the film with a mix of weary resignation, flashes of intelligence, and a few moments of grumpiness that serve to humanize the character." In 2026, Lim won the Best Actor award from Russia's Zabaikalsky International Film Festival for this role.

== Personal life ==
Lim is the older brother of fellow actor Lim Kay Siu, who he starred with in multiple plays. His sister, Irene Lim Kay Han, is an actress. He is first cousins with singer-songwriter Dick Lee.

Lim is married to food writer Sylvia Tan Jui Huang, whom playwright Michael Chiang introduced him to. They have one son and two grandchildren. He is also an amateur photographer.

== Filmography ==
=== Film ===
Year	Title	Role	Notes	Ref
1983	The Highest Honor		Uncredited	
1986	Shanghai Surprise	Mei Gan		
1988	Off Limits	Lime Green		
1988	Keys to Freedom	Floating Whorehouse Yee		
1992	Fifty/Fifty	Akhantar		
1993	Dragon: The Bruce Lee Story	Philip Tan		
1994	It Could Happen to You	Sun		
1995	Mee Pok Man	Mike Kor		
1996	Army Daze	Captain Lim		
1996	Final Cut		Short film	
1997	12 Storeys	Mark		
1998	Forever Fever (That's the Way I Like It)	Mr. Tay		
1999	Brokedown Palace	Chief Detective Jagkrit		
2001	One Leg Kicking	Sonny Lim		
2001	A Sharp Pencil	Derek		
2001	Gourmet Baby	The Uncle	Short film	
2002	True Files	Lieutenant Wang		
2003	City Sharks	Samuel		
2004	Perth	Harry Lee		
2005	Malice		Short film	
2006	Closur_		Short film	
2007	The Photograph	Johan Tan	Indonesian film	
2008	Dance of the Dragon	Li Bao		
2009	Good Morning 60	Peter Pang	Short film	
2010	The Impossibility of Knowing	Narrator	Short film	
2013	Durian King	Charlie		
2013	Broken Maiden	Felix	Short film	
2014	Fragrant Rice	Butterfly		
2014	Afterimages	Agent Sin		
2014	The Body	Old Man	Short film	
2015	1965	Lee Kuan Yew		
2016	Rough Mix	Allen		
2024	Tanglin Tango	Richard Lee Wai Keong	Short film	
2025	The Old Man And His Car	Hock		

=== Television ===
Year	Title	Role	Notes
1981	The Chinese Detective	Scarface	Episode: "Washing"
1982	Doctor Who	Chinaman	3 episodes (uncredited)
1984	Tenko	Chinese Policeman / Soldier	2 episodes
1985	Tenko Reunion	Bandit Leader	TV film
1988	Noble House	Brian Kwok	4 episodes
1989	Tanamera – Lion of Singapore	Keow Tak	6 episodes
1990	H.E.L.P.	Danny Tran	Episode: "Fire Down Below"
1992	Frankie's House	Frankie	TV film
1992	The Ruth Rendell Mysteries	Sung Lao Zhong	Episode: "The Speaker of Mandarin: Part One"
1994	Vanishing Son	Louyung Chang	
1994	Murder, She Wrote	Bok	Episode: "A Murderous Muse"
1994	Vanishing Son IV	Louyung Chang	
1994	Masters of the Sea	Stanley Sim	40 episodes
1995	Troubled Waters	Stanley Sim	
1996–2001	Growing Up	Mr Charlie Tay Wee Kiat	Nominated: Asian Television Award 2001 Best Performance by an Actor (Drama)
1997	Shiver	Kai	Episode: "Stolen Memories"
1998	A Bright Shining Lie	Colonel Cao Huynh Van	TV film
1998	Heritage: Financial Institutions	Narrator	TV documentary
2000	Hanging by a Thread		TV documentary
2001	Brand New Towkay	Arthur Sebastian Wee	
2002–2006	True Files	Host & Narrator	
2002–2003	I, Collector	Narrator	
2002–2004	Building Dreams: In Search of Singapore Architecture	Narrator	TV documentary series
2003	No Place Like Home	Chye Meng	Episode: "The Chan Family"
2004	Life		Episode: "Old Men and a Baby"
2005	Spoilt		TV film
2005	Nova	Voice over	Episode: "Sinking the Supership"
2005	4x4 - Episodes of Singapore Art		2 episodes
2005–2006	Police & Thief	Kilpatrick Khoo	4 episodes
2007	Random Acts	Various Roles	
2007	Stories of Love: The Anthology	Peter	Episode: "My Promise"
2007	Marco Polo	Lord Chenchu	TV film
2007	Presidential Art	Narrator	TV documentary
2008	Son of the Dragon	Governor	TV film
2008	Kung Fu Killer	Khan	TV film
2008	The Perfect Exit	Koh Kwan Howe	
2008	En Bloc	Chok Chye Cheng	Nominated: Asian Television Award 2010 Best Drama Performance by an Actor
2008	Parental Guidance	The Colonel	3 episodes
2008	Spirit of the Time: the World of Chinese Contemporary Art	Narrator	TV documentary series
2009	The Philanthropist	General Win	Episode: "Myanmar"
2009	Stormworld	Khelioz	8 episodes
2010–2011	The Pupil	Harris Fong Weng Kiong	8 episodes; Won: Asian Television Award 2010 Best Drama Performance by an Actor in a Supporting Role
2011	Perfect Deception	Dr James Lee	12 episodes
2013	Serangoon Road	Tiger General	4 episodes
2013	A Deadly Turn		
2014	Grace	William Li	4 episodes; Won: Asian Television Award 2015 Best Supporting Actor
2014	Marco Polo		
2015	2025	William Tay	13 episodes
2015	Second Chances	Max	TV film
2015	Love is Love	Andrew	TV film series; Episode: "Sunset"
2015	Lion Moms	Papa	
2017–2019	Meet the MP	Chairman Lao	4 episodes
2020	Raksasa	Salihin Heng	TV film; Won: Pesta Perdana 2021 Best Actor in a Leading Role - Drama Special/Anthology; Nominated: New York Festivals TV & Film Awards 2021 Best Actor
2020	Invisible Stories	Harry	Episode: "Keagan"
2021	Reunion	Robert Yeh	
2021	On the Red Dot	Self	Episode: "Reunions: Under One Roof And Growing Up"
2023	Veil	Edward	
2023	Last Madame: Sisters of the Night	Master Chen	
2025	On the Red Dot	Self	Episode: "Movies That Made Us"

== Theatre ==
Year	Title	Role	Notes
1974	Are You There, Singapore?	Lim Soon Chye	
1975	Equus		
1975	One Mad Night		
1982	Terry Rex	Terry	Singapore Drama Festival Best Actor Award
1982	F.O.B. (Fresh Off Boat)	Steve	Part of the Singapore Festival of Arts
1983	The Nuns		
1983	Abigail's Party	Lawrence	
1984	Going West		
1984	Bumboat!		Part of the Singapore Festival of Arts
1985	Be My Sushi Tonight	Hirota-san	Adapted from Mike Leigh's Goose Pimples
1985	Paradise Heights	Director	
1985	Love & Belachan		
1985	Fanshen		
1985, 1987	The Coffin Is Too Big for the Hole		
1986–1987	No Parking on Odd Days		
1986	Rashomon	Tajomaru	
1986	The Window		
1986	The Maids & Diary of a Madman	Claire	
1986	Ash & Shadowless	Henry	
1987	The Elephant Man	Frederick Treves	
1988	Piaf		
1988	Three Children		
1989	Metamorphosis		
1990	The Dance and the Railroad & The Sound of a Voice		
1993	The Lady of Soul and Her Ultimate "S" Machine	Derek	
1994	Undercover		
1994	Longing	Collaborator & Performer	
1995	Broken Birds: An Epic Longing		
1998	Art		
1998	Beauty World		10th Anniversary Production
2003	Revelations		
2003	Oh Man!		
2004	The House of Sleeping Beauties	Yasunari Kawabata	Nominated: The Straits Times Life! Theatre Awards 2005 Best Actor
2004	Mixed Blessings		
2005	Quills	Dr Royer Collard	
2005	Heavenly Bento		
2005	Skylight	Tom	
2006	Diaspora		
2010	Visible Cities	Police Officer	
2010	The Red Ballerina	Collaborator & Performer	
2012–2013	Goh Lay Kuan & Kuo Pao Kun	Kuo Pao Kun	Nominated: The Straits Times Life! Theatre Awards 2013 Best Actor
2018	In The Silence Of Your Heart	Thian	Voice-over
