= List of Your Hand In Mine episodes =

Your Hand In Mine (Chinese: 想握你的手) was a long-running TV drama produced by Singapore's free-to-air channel, MediaCorp TV Channel 8. With 180 episodes, it was the longest local drama produced by Mediacorp, until it was succeeded by 118. It aired on weekdays at 7:00 pm. The series' cast included are Huang Wenyong, Chen Liping, Yvonne Lim, Pierre Png, Belinda Lee, Shaun Chen, Paige Chua, Joanne Peh, Pan Lingling and Cavin Soh.

== Episodes ==
No.	Title	Original release date	Encore date
1	"Episode 1"	November 9, 2009	March 17, 2012; PG Some Disturbing Scenes
The Zheng family lives in a five-room HDB flat. Zheng Shanguo owns two coffee-shops, 899, and is a thrifty and frugal man. His wife, Zhang Yuxiang, is a spendthrift who hankers after branded goods. Shanguo has three daughters, Aizhen, Aishan and Aimei. Aizhen is at loggerheads with her next-door neighbour Liqin, who lives with his sister, Lifen and grandmother, Jinyin. Ah Quan, Shanguo's neighbour, commits suicide, leaving his family to pay his gambling debts. Lifen goes door to door, collecting donations for his family. With her brother's help, she persuades their neighbours to donate, attracting them with a lucky dip in which could be found a $900 television set. Yuxiang steals $2000 from Shanguo to pay her friend, Helen, for a branded handbag by pretending to have a nightmare in which the ghost of Ah Quan demanded $2000 from her for stepping on hell-notes meant for him.
2	"Episode 2"	November 10, 2009	March 17, 2012; PG Some Disturbing Scenes
Yuxiang loses the money meant for Helen. Wu Youli, a rag and bone man finds the money and secretly gives it to Quansao, Ah Quan's wife. Quansao, thinking that the money was from Lifen, calls the media and tells them about Lifen. As the reporter, Yang Yan, interviews Lifen, Yuxiang claims to be the kind-hearted soul who had donated the money to Quansao, through the ghost of Ah Quan. Wu Youqing, Youli's lawyer sister, returns from overseas after winning a tough case. Youli frames up a newspaper cutting featuring his sister and places it in a prominent place at their house. Yuxiang announces to her employees at 899 that she would be on television that night, only to find out that her segment had been cut by the Yang Yan. She is relieved when she finds out that the televisions at 899 had broken down, but is horrified to learn that they had been watching Param's mobile TV. Yuxiang wrongly accuses Youli of molesting Aimei, but Aimei tells her that she was just frightened by his appearance.
3	"Episode 3"	November 11, 2009	March 18, 2012
Liqin dresses up as a ghost to scare the three sisters as revenge for Aishan's vomiting into his bag. Yuxiang is worried that it is Ah Quan’s soul. When their grandmother asked if they’ve done any wrong against him, all three sisters confess their guilt. Aimei develops a fever as a result. Yuxiang and Shanguo offer Quansao a job at 899's rojak stall and Quansao gratefully accepts it. Yuxiang tells Quansao to tell Ah Quan's ghost to forgive and forget. Quansao is puzzled but feels obliged to do so. Yuxiang meets her old secondary school friend, Duoli, a property agent, at the Women's Club. She directs her to a bungalow which she claims is her own, but Duoli plays along, knowing that she was lying.
4	"Episode 4"	November 12, 2009	March 18, 2012 PG
Yuxiang bumps into the arrogant Zen, an actress, during one of her shopping trips. Out of pride, she insists on buying a pair of branded shoes. She has no money to pay for it as Shanguo had secretly stolen her money, and asks for Aizhen’s help. Quansao is ostracised by her neighbours and is sacked from the rojak store when her husband is diagnosed with AIDS following a post-mortem. She and her children begin to starve. Aizhen is made a mockery by Liqin when she accidentally steps on urine in the lift. Upset, Aizhen goes to Liqin’s house on the pretext of looking for Lifen, and secretly plants laxative in his drink. Jianzhou, Jinyin's husband, asks Aizhen to write his daughter-in-law, Guan Qiumei a letter, informing her of the family's new address. Aizhen is told to keep the letter a secret but it is snatched away by Jinyin, who burns the letter.
5	"Episode 5"	November 13, 2009	March 24, 2012
Lifen begs Guoshan to give Quansao a job. However, Guoshan refuses to help as he is afraid that his wife would make an objection. Lifen tricks Aishan and Yuxiang into witnessing the sorrowful plight of Quansao and Yuxiang finally agrees to hire her. Duoli is estranged from her husband, Hanwen, but they pretend to be a happy couple for the sake of their children. They divorce, promising to continue putting on an act for two more years, after which their daughter Xiaoxi would have completed her pre-University examinations.
6	"Episode 6"	November 16, 2009	March 24, 2012 PG
Yuxiang yearns to move into a landed property and secretly goes house-viewing with her three daughters and Duoli. Shanguo faints when he hears about Yuxiang’s plans to buy a S$4,000,000 house and leaves the flat in a fit of anger. Yuxiang goes searching for him and promises not to bring up the issue again. Qiumei is released from prison after fifteen years for the manslaughter of her husband and tries to find her family home, only to find that they had moved. She stays in a motel instead. Youqing has a fear of enclosed spaces and refuses to take lifts. While climbing down the stairs, she meets Yue Guang, a psychologist, and mistakes him for a pervert when he asks her to take off her stockings. Aizhen forces her admirer to pose as a flasher in front of Shanguo, hoping that the incident would persuade him to move.
7	"Episode 7"	November 17, 2009	March 25, 2012; PG Some Sexual References
Yuxiang bribes 4D to pose as a robber so as to frighten Shanguo into moving, but he fails. Shanguo tells her that he'd rather die with his money than give up his $4,000,000. As one of Jinyin's mahjong kakis, Big Mouth Gang, was late to arrive at her mahjong session, they start with Qiaomei instead and she surprises them with her mahjong skills, despite claiming to not know anything about the game. Aimei dirties her pants and returns home to shower, only to be peeped at by Big Mouth Gang when she drops her towel. Her scream is heard at Jinyin's house, but Qiaomei dismisses it as a small matter, saying that her granddaughters scream several times a day. When she arrives home, Qiaomei asks Aimei about what had happened and Aimei tells her that she no longer has the will to live. Qiaomei tries to comfort her by telling her that she had to strip (in front of a doctor) before, only to be chided by Yuxiang.
8	"Episode 8"	November 18, 2009	March 25, 2012; PG Some Sexual References
Aimei identifies Big Mouth Gang as the Peeping Tom and Yuxiang and Shanguo beat him and his cronies up, only to find Aimei missing. She returns to the coffeeshop soon after and faints. Yuxiang decides to send Aimei to Yue Guang, but she runs away from the office. Yue Guang sees her on the rooftop, and thinking that she was about to commit suicide, tries to save her, only to fall off the roof with her, landing on a pickup, their lips touching in the process. The pickup drives away and Yuxiang is worried sick, not knowing Aimei's whereabouts. Aimei is brought home by Qiumei, who had found her on the pickup after it was parked by the roadside. Yuxiang rewards her with a job at the coffeeshop, where she is praised for her efficiency by Uncle Rojak but belittled by 4D for her backwardness. Youli tries to collect empty drink cans from 899, but Yuxiang stops him and claims the cans as her property. Qiumei meets up with him and persuades him not to make trouble at the coffeeshop, saying that kindness begets kindness. Shanguo refuses to purchase the $4,000,000 bungalow and Dolly proposes a house at Lentor Plain just over $1,000,000.
9	"Episode 9"	November 19, 2009	March 31, 2012
Dolly sells the house at Lentor Plain to Yuxiang, much to Youli's disappointment. Youli releases cockroaches into the property but Dolly kills them before Shanguo manages to notice them. Aizhen meets Yang Yan on a shopping trip and identifies her as the one who had cut her mother's interview. She takes revenge on her by disputing her credibility as a neutral party on national TV. Feeling that talking in front of a camera is a breeze for her, she decides to apply for a job as a news reporter for Yang Yan's news channel, Clear Sky. Yuxiang persuades Shanguo to send Aimei to a psychiatrist again. Shanguo reluctantly agrees and Aimei returns to Yue Guang's office. Upon realising that Yue Guang was the 'lecher' who kissed her on the pickup, she tries to run away, but Yue Guang calms her down. Amazed at her daughter's quick recovery, she happily pays the bill of $300. Hanwen goes to Jinyin's house with news of Qiumei's release and her wish to meet them. Jinyin chases him out, saying that they wanted nothing to do with her. Lifen is suspicious but finds it better not to probe too far.
10	"Episode 10"	November 20, 2009	March 31, 2012
Qiumei pressurizes Hanwen into giving her Jinyin's address. He relents after much pleading from the formal. Shanguo wants his mother to move with the family into the new house but Yuxiang objects. Qiaomei, listening at the door, is distressed because of this. Yuxiang and Shanguo go for a meeting with the new house's designer but Shanguo cancels it, much to Yuxiang's displeasure. Aizhen meets Fang Kai while working on a project with Lifen. She is immediately attracted to his long sideburns and becomes infatutated with him. Back at 899, Qiumei asks Aizhen about Liqin's likes. Aizhen decides to use the opportunity to get back at her enemy. Qiaomei takes up mahjong and discovers her talent after she repeatedly defeats Jinyin, famed for her mahjong prowess. Shanguo assures Qiaomei that she would not be forgotten after the move and she jokes that she would be content as long as she gets a regular supply of bird's nest. Yuxiang tries to raise money for the house's renovation by collecting money early from her coffeeshop tenants.
11	"Episode 11"	November 23, 2009	April 7, 2012 PG
Dolly and Zen become friends over a game of pool. They have a drinking competition and both women end up returning home drunk. In her drunken state, Dolly seduces Hanwen. The next day, she quarrels with him, accusing him of taking advantage of her. Aizhen knows that Liqin is allergic to the fur of teddy bears. However, she tells Qiumei that he adores them. When Qiumei shows up at her son's flat the next day, she is pushed out and Liqin throws the toy out of the window. Aizhen thinks that Qiumei may commit suicide and is relieved to see her leave the block safely. Qiumei had murdered her husband on Liqin's birthday. Jinyin was so furious that she made a memorial tablet for Qiumei as well as her husband, telling Lifen that her mother was dead. Liqin asks Aizhen to help him keep that secret from Lifen. She ends up thinking that the two enemies had 'reconciled' and had become an item. Liqin is haunted by his past and could not concentrate on his studies.
12	"Episode 12"	November 24, 2009	April 7, 2012 PG
Aimei overhears Qiaomei and Aizhen talking about Qiumei's past and is astonished to find out that she was a murderer. Aishan instructs her to bury her secrets in a bottle, but 4D overhears her speaking her secret into the bottle and leaks the news. By the next morning, every worker at 899 knew about Qiumei's secret. Yuxiang secretly purchases expensive furniture and toilet bowls but claims that they were only fakes and imitations from Taiwan and China. She makes Nelson Tan, the interior designer, forge the receipts to make them correspond to the prices she had declared to Shanguo, who tries to make her drunk so as to divulge her secrets. She gives nothing away. Youli has lunch at a restaurant with magnate Jason Fang, who admires his talent in financial strategies and stocks.
13	"Episode 13"	November 25, 2009	April 8, 2012
14	"Episode 14"	November 26, 2009	April 8, 2012 PG
15	"Episode 15"	November 27, 2009	April 14, 2012 PG
16	"Episode 16"	November 30, 2009	April 14, 2012
17	"Episode 17"	December 1, 2009	April 15, 2012
18	"Episode 18"	December 2, 2009	April 15, 2012
19	"Episode 19"	December 3, 2009	April 21, 2012
20	"Episode 20"	December 4, 2009	April 21, 2012
21	"Episode 21"	December 7, 2009	April 22, 2012
22	"Episode 22"	December 8, 2009	April 22, 2012
23	"Episode 23"	December 9, 2009	April 28, 2012
24	"Episode 24"	December 10, 2009	April 28, 2012
25	"Episode 25"	December 11, 2009	May 5, 2012
26	"Episode 26"	December 14, 2009	May 5, 2012
27	"Episode 27"	December 15, 2009	May 12, 2012
28	"Episode 28"	December 16, 2009	May 12, 2012
29	"Episode 29"	December 17, 2009	May 19, 2012
30	"Episode 30"	December 18, 2009	May 19, 2012 PG
31	"Episode 31"	December 21, 2009	May 20, 2012
32	"Episode 32"	December 22, 2009	May 20, 2012
33	"Episode 33"	December 23, 2009	May 26, 2012
34	"Episode 34"	December 24, 2009	May 26, 2012
35	"Episode 35"	December 25, 2009	May 27, 2012 PG
36	"Episode 36"	December 28, 2009	May 27, 2012
37	"Episode 37"	December 29, 2009	June 2, 2012 PG
38	"Episode 38"	December 30, 2009	June 2, 2012 PG
39	"Episode 39"	December 31, 2009	June 3, 2012
40	"Episode 40"	January 1, 2010	June 3, 2012
41	"Episode 41"	January 4, 2010	June 9, 2012
42	"Episode 42"	January 5, 2010	June 9, 2012
43	"Episode 43"	January 6, 2010	June 10, 2012
44	"Episode 44"	January 7, 2010	June 10, 2012
45	"Episode 45"	January 8, 2010	June 16, 2012 PG
46	"Episode 46"	January 11, 2010	June 16, 2012
47	"Episode 47"	January 12, 2010	June 17, 2012
48	"Episode 48"	January 13, 2010	June 17, 2012
49	"Episode 49"	January 14, 2010	June 23, 2012
50	"Episode 50"	January 15, 2010	June 23, 2012; PG Junevile Delinquency
51	"Episode 51"	January 18, 2010	June 24, 2012
52	"Episode 52"	January 19, 2010	June 24, 2012
53	"Episode 53"	January 20, 2010	June 30, 2012
54	"Episode 54"	January 21, 2010	June 30, 2012
55	"Episode 55"	January 22, 2010	July 1, 2012 PG
56	"Episode 56"	January 25, 2010	July 1, 2012 PG
57	"Episode 57"	January 26, 2010	July 7, 2012 PG
58	"Episode 58"	January 27, 2010	July 7, 2012 PG
59	"Episode 59"	January 28, 2010	July 8, 2012 PG
60	"Episode 60"	January 29, 2010	July 8, 2012 PG
61	"Episode 61"	February 1, 2010	July 14, 2012 PG
62	"Episode 62"	February 2, 2010	July 14, 2012 PG
63	"Episode 63"	February 3, 2010	July 15, 2012
64	"Episode 64"	February 4, 2010	July 15, 2012 PG
65	"Episode 65"	February 5, 2010	July 21, 2012 PG
66	"Episode 66"	February 8, 2010	July 21, 2012 PG
67	"Episode 67"	February 9, 2010	July 22, 2012 PG
68	"Episode 68"	February 10, 2010	July 22, 2012
69	"Episode 69"	February 11, 2010	July 28, 2012
70	"Episode 70"	February 12, 2010	July 28, 2012
71	"Episode 71"	February 15, 2010	July 29, 2012
72	"Episode 72"	February 16, 2010	July 29, 2012 PG
73	"Episode 73"	February 17, 2010	August 4, 2012 PG
74	"Episode 74"	February 18, 2010	August 4, 2012 PG
75	"Episode 75"	February 19, 2010	August 5, 2012 PG
76	"Episode 76"	February 22, 2010	August 5, 2012
77	"Episode 77"	February 23, 2010	August 11, 2012; PG Some Sexual References
78	"Episode 78"	February 24, 2010	August 11, 2012
79	"Episode 79"	February 25, 2010	August 12, 2012 PG
80	"Episode 80"	February 26, 2010	August 12, 2012; PG Some Sexual References
81	"Episode 81"	March 1, 2010	August 18, 2012; PG Some Sexual References
82	"Episode 82"	March 2, 2010	August 18, 2012; PG Some Sexual References
83	"Episode 83"	March 3, 2010	August 19, 2012 PG
84	"Episode 84"	March 4, 2010	August 19, 2012; PG Some Sexual References
85	"Episode 85"	March 5, 2010	August 25, 2012 PG
86	"Episode 86"	March 8, 2010	August 25, 2012 PG
87	"Episode 87"	March 9, 2010	August 19, 2012; PG Some Sexual References
88	"Episode 88"	March 10, 2010	August 19, 2012; PG Some Sexual References
89	"Episode 89"	March 11, 2010	September 2, 2012 PG
90	"Episode 90"	March 12, 2010	September 2, 2012 PG
91	"Episode 91"	March 15, 2010	September 8, 2012 PG
92	"Episode 92"	March 16, 2010	September 8, 2012 PG
93	"Episode 93"	March 17, 2010	September 9, 2012 PG
94	"Episode 94"	March 18, 2010	September 9, 2012 PG
95	"Episode 95"	March 19, 2010	September 15, 2012 PG
96	"Episode 96"	March 22, 2010	September 15, 2012 PG
97	"Episode 97"	March 23, 2010	September 16, 2012 PG
98	"Episode 98"	March 24, 2010	September 16, 2012 PG
99	"Episode 99"	March 25, 2010	September 22, 2012 PG
100	"Episode 100"	March 26, 2010	September 22, 2012 PG
101	"Episode 101"	March 29, 2010	September 23, 2012 PG
102	"Episode 102"	March 30, 2010	September 23, 2012 PG
103	"Episode 103"	March 31, 2010	September 29, 2012 PG
104	"Episode 104"	April 1, 2010	September 29, 2012 PG
105	"Episode 105"	April 2, 2010	September 30, 2012 PG
106	"Episode 106"	April 5, 2010	September 30, 2012 PG
107	"Episode 107"	April 6, 2010	October 6, 2012 PG
108	"Episode 108"	April 7, 2010	October 6, 2012 PG
109	"Episode 109"	April 8, 2010	October 7, 2012 PG
110	"Episode 110"	April 9, 2010	October 7, 2012 PG
111	"Episode 111"	April 12, 2010	October 13, 2012 PG
112	"Episode 112"	April 13, 2010	October 13, 2012 PG
113	"Episode 113"	April 14, 2010	October 14, 2012 PG
114	"Episode 114"	April 15, 2010	October 14, 2012 PG
115	"Episode 115"	April 16, 2010	October 20, 2012 PG
116	"Episode 116"	April 19, 2010	October 20, 2012 PG
117	"Episode 117"	April 20, 2010	October 21, 2012 PG
118	"Episode 118"	April 21, 2010	October 21, 2012 PG
119	"Episode 119"	April 22, 2010	October 27, 2012 PG
120	"Episode 120"	April 23, 2010	October 27, 2012 PG
121	"Episode 121"	April 26, 2010	October 28, 2012 PG
122	"Episode 122"	April 27, 2010	October 28, 2012 PG
123	"Episode 123"	April 28, 2010	November 3, 2012 PG
124	"Episode 124"	April 29, 2010	November 3, 2012 PG
125	"Episode 125"	April 30, 2010	November 4, 2012 PG
126	"Episode 126"	May 3, 2010	November 4, 2012 PG
127	"Episode 127"	May 4, 2010	November 10, 2012 PG
128	"Episode 128"	May 5, 2010	November 10, 2012 PG
129	"Episode 129"	May 6, 2010	November 11, 2012 PG
130	"Episode 130"	May 7, 2010	November 11, 2012 PG
131	"Episode 131"	May 10, 2010	November 17, 2012 PG
132	"Episode 132"	May 11, 2010	November 17, 2012 PG
133	"Episode 133"	May 12, 2010	November 18, 2012 PG
134	"Episode 134"	May 13, 2010	November 18, 2012 PG
135	"Episode 135"	May 14, 2010	November 24, 2012 PG
136	"Episode 136"	May 17, 2010	November 24, 2012 PG
137	"Episode 137"	May 18, 2010	December 1, 2012 PG
138	"Episode 138"	May 19, 2010	December 1, 2012 PG
139	"Episode 139"	May 20, 2010	December 2, 2012 PG
140	"Episode 140"	May 21, 2010	December 2, 2012 PG
141	"Episode 141"	May 24, 2010	December 8, 2012 PG
142	"Episode 142"	May 25, 2010	December 8, 2012 PG
143	"Episode 143"	May 26, 2010	December 9, 2012 PG
144	"Episode 144"	May 27, 2010	December 9, 2012 PG
145	"Episode 145"	May 28, 2010	December 15, 2012 PG
146	"Episode 146"	May 31, 2010	December 15, 2012 PG
147	"Episode 147"	June 1, 2010	December 16, 2012 PG
148	"Episode 148"	June 2, 2010	December 16, 2012 PG
149	"Episode 149"	June 3, 2010	December 22, 2012 PG
150	"Episode 150"	June 4, 2010	December 22, 2012 PG
151	"Episode 151"	June 7, 2010	December 23, 2012 PG
152	"Episode 152"	June 8, 2010	December 23, 2012 PG
153	"Episode 153"	June 9, 2010	December 29, 2012; PG Some Violence
154	"Episode 154"	June 10, 2010	December 29, 2012; PG Some Violence
155	"Episode 155"	June 11, 2010	December 30, 2012 PG
156	"Episode 156"	June 14, 2010	December 30, 2012 PG
157	"Episode 157"	June 15, 2010	January 5, 2013 PG
158	"Episode 158"	June 16, 2010	January 5, 2012 PG
159	"Episode 159"	June 17, 2010	January 6, 2013 PG
160	"Episode 160"	June 18, 2010	January 6, 2013 PG
161	"Episode 161"	June 21, 2010	January 12, 2013 PG
162	"Episode 162"	June 22, 2010	January 12, 2013 PG
163	"Episode 163"	June 23, 2010	January 13, 2013 PG
164	"Episode 164"	June 24, 2010	January 13, 2013 PG
165	"Episode 165"	June 25, 2010	January 19, 2013 PG
166	"Episode 166"	June 28, 2010	January 19, 2013 PG
167	"Episode 167"	June 29, 2010	January 20, 2013 PG
168	"Episode 168"	June 30, 2010	January 20, 2013 PG
169	"Episode 169"	July 1, 2010	January 26, 2013 PG
170	"Episode 170"	July 2, 2010	January 26, 2013 PG
171	"Episode 171"	July 5, 2010	January 27, 2013 PG
172	"Episode 172"	July 6, 2010	January 27, 2013 PG
173	"Episode 173"	July 7, 2010	February 2, 2013 PG
174	"Episode 174"	July 8, 2010	February 2, 2013 PG
175	"Episode 175"	July 9, 2010	February 3, 2013; PG Some Violence
176	"Episode 176"	July 12, 2010	February 3, 2013 PG
177	"Episode 177"	July 13, 2010	February 16, 2013 PG
178	"Episode 178"	July 14, 2010	February 16, 2013 PG
179	"Episode 179"	July 15, 2010	February 17, 2013; PG Some Violence
180	"Episode 180 (Finale)"	July 16, 2010	February 17, 2013; PG Some Violence
