= List of On the Red Dot episodes =

On The Red Dot is a current affairs/info-ed programme hosted by Cheryl Fox and Otelli Edwards. The show, which airs on MediaCorp Channel 5 and Channel NewsAsia, examines issues that are close to the hearts of all Singaporeans.

== Episode list ==
=== Episodes 1-22 (2012-13) ===
No.	Title	Air date on 5	Air date on CNA
1	"Shared Values in Singapore"	October 31, 2012	November 3, 2012
2	"Shift Towards Holistic Education"	November 7, 2012	November 10, 2012
3	"Caring for our Elderly"	November 14, 2012	November 17, 2012
4	"Youths and the Internet"	November 21, 2012	November 24, 2012
5	"Foreigners and Integration"	November 28, 2012	December 1, 2012
6	"Cost of Living"	December 5, 2012	December 8, 2012
7	"Places and Spaces"	December 12, 2012	December 15, 2012
8	"Transport and Commuter Challenges"	December 19, 2012	December 22, 2012
9	"Conservation Versus Urban Redevelopment"	December 26, 2012	December 29, 2012
10	"Singapore Identity: What makes us uniquely Singaporean?"	January 2, 2013	January 5, 2013
11	"Singapore's Baby Bust: Why aren't we having more babies?"	January 9, 2013	January 12, 2013
12	"Singapore Population Challenges"	January 16, 2013	January 19, 2013
13	"Why do we need foreign workers in Singapore?"	January 23, 2013	January 26, 2013
14	"Helping Those In Need"	January 30, 2013	February 2, 2013
15	"Planning for the future"	February 6, 2013	February 9, 2013
16	"Safeguarding Our Food Supply"	February 13, 2013	February 16, 2013
17	"Are Singaporeans Charitable?"	February 20, 2013	February 23, 2013
18	"A Gracious Singapore...Are we there yet?"	February 27, 2013	March 2, 2013
19	"Singapore's Push for Productivity"	March 6, 2013	March 9, 2013
20	"A Singaporean Core in the Workforce"	March 13, 2013	March 16, 2013
21	"Delivering affordable and accessible healthcare for all"	March 20, 2013	March 23, 2013
22	"Housing the nation - Should HDB flats be a home or an asset?"	March 27, 2013	March 30, 2013

=== Episodes 23-58 (2013) ===
No.	Title	Air date on 5	Air date on CNA
23	"The young and driven - the complex reality behind young Singaporeans today"	April 3, 2013	April 6, 2013
24	"Water! Life on an island"	April 10, 2013	April 13, 2013
25	"Responsible Pet Ownership - what does it take?"	April 17, 2013; PG Graphic Visuals	April 20, 2013
26	"Going Green - are we making enough progress?"	April 24, 2013	April 27, 2013
27	"The Education Review – reducing stress and nurturing kinder citizens"	May 1, 2013	May 4, 2013
28	"Nurturing a Sporting Culture in Singapore"	May 8, 2013	May 11, 2013
29	"Towards a Broader Definition of Success"	May 15, 2013	May 18, 2013
30	"Unconventional Careers – Entrepreneurship and unusual career choices of Singaporeans"	May 22, 2013	May 25, 2013
31	"Health Matters – Crucial health issues in Singapore"	May 29, 2013	June 1, 2013
32	"Tourism – Selling the Singaporean experience"	June 5, 2013	June 8, 2013
33	"Family matters – the state of the Singaporean family"	June 12, 2013	June 15, 2013
34	"Pre-school education – raising standards and attracting qualified educators"	June 19, 2013	June 22, 2013
35	"Active ageing – Older workers and volunteers"	June 26, 2013	June 29, 2013
36	"Fighting Dengue"	July 3, 2013	July 6, 2013
37	"Technology and You"	July 10, 2013	July 13, 2013
38	"The Good, The Bad and The Funny"	July 17, 2013	July 20, 2013
39	"Find My Kid A School"	July 24, 2013	July 27, 2013
40	"Green Heritage"	July 31, 2013	August 3, 2013
41	"Being Singaporean"	August 7, 2013	August 10, 2013
42	"The Price of Looking Good"	August 14, 2013	August 17, 2013
43	"Enrichment for Kids"	August 21, 2013	August 24, 2013
44	"The Pioneer Generation"	August 28, 2013	August 31, 2013
45	"Cyber Malice"	September 4, 2013	September 7, 2013
46	"Baby Maybe"	September 11, 2013	September 14, 2013
47	"Able Disabled"	September 18, 2013	September 21, 2013
48	"Kids Extraordinaire"	September 25, 2013	September 28, 2013
49	"Migrant Workers in Our Midst"	October 2, 2013	October 5, 2013
50	"Finding Happiness"	October 9, 2013	October 12, 2013
51	"Mid-Career Moves"	October 16, 2013	October 19, 2013
52	"Staying Rooted"	October 23, 2013	October 26, 2013
53	"Taxi, Taxi!"	October 30, 2013	November 2, 2013
54	"For Art's Sake"	November 6, 2013	November 9, 2013
55	"Our Kind of Music"	November 13, 2013	November 16, 2013
56	"Typhoon Haiyan"	November 20, 2013	November 23, 2013
57	"Navigating the Digital Age"	November 27, 2013	November 30, 2013
58	"Learning Journeys"	December 4, 2013	December 7, 2013

=== Episodes 59-108 (2014) ===
No.	Title	Air date on 5	Air date on CNA
59	"Flash Back"	January 8, 2014	January 11, 2014
60	"Cracking Cancer"	January 15, 2014	January 19, 2014
61	"Pro Bono Heroes"	January 22, 2014	January 25, 2014
62	"Usher in the Year of the Horse"	(technical glitch)	January 29, 2014
63	"Rethinking Health"	February 5, 2014	February 5, 2014
64	"That's My Backyard...Tiong Bahru"	February 12, 2014	February 12, 2014
65	"That's My Backyard... Dakota Crescent"	February 19, 2014	February 19, 2014
66	"That's My Backyard... Kampong Glam"	February 26, 2014	February 26, 2014
67	"That's My Backyard... Joo Chiat"	March 5, 2014	March 5, 2014
68	"That's My Backyard... Holland Village"	March 12, 2014	March 12, 2014
69	"That's My Backyard... Kranji"	March 19, 2014	March 19, 2014
70	"That's My Backyard... Sembawang"	March 26, 2014	March 26, 2014
71	"Finding Closure"	April 2, 2014	April 6, 2014
72	"Work in Progress: A Taste for Tradition"	April 9, 2014	April 13, 2014
73	"Work in Progress: The Call of Nursing"	April 16, 2014	April 20, 2014
74	"Work in Progress: The Call of the Wild!"	April 23, 2014	April 27, 2014
75	"Work in Progress: City in a Garden"	April 30, 2014	May 6, 2014
76	"Work in Progress: Defence Science"	May 7, 2014	May 11, 2014
77	"It Takes A Village: Dealing with Depression"	May 14, 2014	May 18, 2014
78	"It Takes A Village: An Ex-Con’s Breakthrough"	May 21, 2014	May 25, 2014
79	"It Takes A Village: Coming Out Of The Dark"	May 28, 2014	June 1, 2014
80	"It Takes A Village: Mother at 17"	June 4, 2014	June 8, 2014
81	"It Takes A Village: Living with Autism"	June 11, 2014	June 15, 2014
82	"It Takes A Village: Living with Schizophrenia"	June 18, 2014	June 22, 2014
83	"#Youth - For the Cause"	June 25, 2014	June 29, 2014
84	"#Youth - YOLO"	July 2, 2014	July 6, 2014
85	"#Youth - A Different Beat"	July 9, 2014	July 13, 2014
86	"#Youth - Risk Takers and Dealmakers"	July 16, 2014	July 20, 2014
87	"#Youth - Going for Gold"	July 23, 2014	July 27, 2014
88	"MOSAIC - Neighbours"	July 30, 2014	August 3, 2014
89	"MOSAIC - Serving With Love"	August 6, 2014	August 10, 2014
90	"MOSAIC - Acts Of Kindness"	August 13, 2014	August 17, 2014
91	"MOSAIC - Acts Of Kindness"	August 20, 2014	August 24, 2014
92	"Behind The Scenes: Island At Work"	August 27, 2014	August 31, 2014
93	"Behind The Scenes: Fighting Fire"	September 3, 2014	September 7, 2014
94	"Behind The Scenes: Curtains Up"	September 10, 2014	September 14, 2014
95	"Behind The Scenes: On Track"	September 17, 2014	September 21, 2014
96	"Behind The Scenes: Birds, Blooms and Bonding"	September 24, 2014	September 28, 2014
97	"Friends For A Better World: Malaysia"	October 1, 2014	October 5, 2014
98	"Friends For A Better World: India"	October 8, 2014	October 12, 2014
99	"Friends For A Better World: Philippines"	October 15, 2014	October 19, 2014
100	"Friends For A Better World: Indonesia"	October 22, 2014	October 26, 2014
101	"Friends For A Better World: Indonesia 2"	October 29, 2014	November 2, 2014
102	"Friends For A Better World: Cambodia"	November 5, 2014	November 9, 2014
103	"Old School: Taste Of Tradition"	November 12, 2014	November 16, 2014
104	"Old School: House of Memories"	November 19, 2014	November 23, 2014
105	"Old School: Collectibles"	November 26, 2014	November 30, 2014
106	"Old School: Businesses"	December 3, 2014	December 7, 2014
107	"Old School: Music"	December 10, 2014	December 14, 2014
108	"Old School: Fashion"	December 17, 2014	December 21, 2014

Note 1: There was a technical glitch involving the reairing of the segment Chinatown Walk on Usher in the Year of the Horse, during the premiere run on Channel 5. The episode reaired on Channel NewsAsia in full, on the same day at 11.30pm.

Note 2: There was a technical glitch on Work in Progress: City in a Garden just before the end of the show, during the premiere run on Channel Newsasia, and the episode had to reair on 11 May 2014 at 11.30pm.

=== Episodes 109 onwards (2015) ===
No.	Title	Air date on 5
109	"Look Back"	January 1, 2015
110	"Fast Forward (Part 1)"	January 8, 2015
111	"Fast Forward (Part 2)"	January 15, 2015
112	"Fast Forward (Part 3)"	January 22, 2015
113	"Fast Forward (Part 4)"	January 29, 2015
114	"It Takes a Village - HIV"	February 5, 2015
115	"It Takes a Village - Anxiety Disorder"	February 12, 2015
116	"It Takes a Village - Autism"	February 19, 2015
117	"It Takes a Village - Anger Management"	February 26, 2015

=== Episodes 118-166 (2016) ===
No.	Title	Air date on 5
118	"Vanished Places - National Library at Stamford Road"	2016
119	"Vanished Places - The Grand Old Dame"	2016
120	"Vanished Places - National Theatre"	2016
121	"Vanished Places - The Lost Worlds"	2016
122	"That's My Backyard - Geylang Serai"	2016
123	"That’s My Backyard - Serangoon Gardens"	2016
124	"That’s My Backyard - Little India"	2016
125	"That’s My Backyard - Chinatown"	2016
126	"Food Island - Science Of Food"	2016
127	"Fusion Island - Fusion Food"	2016
128	"Food Island - Favourites With A Twist"	2016
129	"Food Island - All Natural"	2016
130	"Made in Singapore - Humour"	2016
131	"Made In Singapore: Films"	2016
132	"Made In Singapore: Fashion"	2016
133	"Made In Singapore: Food"	2016
134	"Footprints Through Time - Sports"	2016
135	"Footprints Through Time - Defence"	2016
136	"Footprints Through Time - Housing"	2016
137	"Footprints Through Time - Education"	2016
138	"Footprints Through Time - Transport"	2016
139	"Footprints Through Time - Health"	2016
140	"Footprints Through Time - Environment"	2016
141	"When the Mountain Fell (Red dot Special)"	2016
142	"Project 4650"	2016
143	"Project 4650"	2016
144	"Project 4650"	2016
145	"Project 4650"	2016
146	"Pioneer Generation"	2016
147	"Pioneer Generation"	2016
148	"Pioneer Generation"	2016
149	"Wish Come True"	2016
150	"Wish Come True"	2016
151	"Wish Come True"	2016
152	"Wish Come True"	2016
153	"Wish Come True"	2016
154	"Wish Come True"	2016
155	"Lookback 2015"	2016
156	"In My Helper's Shoes"	2016
157	"In My Helper's Shoes"	2016
158	"In My Helper's Shoes"	2016
159	"In My Helper's Shoes"	2016
160	"'Love in the Lion City'"	2016
161	"Friends For A Better World"	2016
162	"Friends For A Better World"	2016
163	"Friends For A Better World"	2016
164	"Friends For A Better World"	2016
165	"Friends For A Better World"	2016
166	"Friends For A Better World"	2016

=== Special Series (2020) ===
No.	Title	Air date on 5	Air date on CNA (NewsAsia)
1	"COVID-19: Alone Together (Part 1)"	January 1, 2020	January 1, 2020
2	"COVID-19: Alone Together (Part 2)"	January 8, 2020	January 9, 2020
