= Jerry Yeo =

Singaporean actor (born 1986)

- Born: 29 June 1986 (age 39); Singapore
- Education: Anglican High School; Victoria Junior College
- Alma mater: Nanyang Technological University; Singapore Flying College
- Occupations: Aircraft pilot; actor; host
- Years active: 2007−2014 (as entertainer)
- Awards: Star Search 2007 : 1st Runner-up; Star Awards 2010 : Most Unforgettable Villain

Chinese name
- Traditional Chinese: 楊偉烈
- Simplified Chinese: 杨伟烈
- Hanyu Pinyin: Yáng Wěiliè

Jerry Yeo Wee Lie (born 29 June 1986) is a Singaporean aircraft pilot and former actor and host. He was a full-time Mediacorp artiste from 2007 to 2014.

== Early life ==
Yeo was educated at Anglican High School and Victoria Junior College. He graduated from the NTU Wee Kim Wee School of Communications in July 2012.

== Career ==
Yeo joined Star Search 2007 whilst a freshman at Nanyang Technological University and was first runner-up. He was signed by MediaCorp but played only minor roles for some time due to his studies.

Yeo was nominated for the Best Newcomer Award in 2009. He garnered critical acclaim for his role as the unscrupulous, wealthy young villain Ye Rende in The Ultimatum despite the lukewarm reviews the series received. At the 2010 Star Awards he won the audience poll for the Most Memorable Villain and was nominated for the Best Supporting Actor. After graduating from NTU he signed with MediaCorp as a full-time artiste.

In August 2014, felt underrated, he left MediaCorp, but continued to take on ad-hoc acting jobs. In 2015, he joined Scoot and is presently a full-time commercial pilot. He has said that he would be happy to return to acting should the opportunity arise.

== Filmography ==
=== Television series ===
Year	Title	Role	Notes	Ref
2015	Love?	Weilie		
2014	Soup of Life	Jin Mao		
2012	Beyond	Wang Shijie		
2012	It Takes Two	Ryan		
2012	Poetic Justice	Youren		
2011	A Tale of 2 Cities	Star		
2010	Mrs P.I.			
2010	Unriddle	Thomas Kok		
2010	The Illusionist	Casper		
2010	Happy Family	Shunshui		
2009	Baby Bonus	Ah Xiang		
2009	The Ultimatum	Ye Rende	Nominated - Best Supporting Actor, Star Awards 2010; Won - Most Unforgettable Villain, Star Awards 2010	
2009	Red Thread	Peter Pereira		
2008	Perfect Cut			
2008	Crime Busters x 2	Lin Zhengwei		
2008	Beach.Ball.Babes (球爱大战)	Cai Guorong		

=== Variety and reality show ===
Year	Title	Role	Notes	Ref
2012	30 Years of Drama Theme Song Concert (戏剧情牵30 – 我们的主题曲 演唱会)	Guest performer		
2008	Fly Me to Beijing 奥游北京	Guest co-host		
2010	Gatekeepers	Guest		
2010	Don't Forget the Lyrics All-Stars Edition	Guest		
2010	New City Beat II (城人新杂志2)	Guest co-host (with Joey Feng)		

== Awards and nominations ==
The Star Awards are presented by Mediacorp.

Year	Ceremony	Category	Nominated work	Result	Ref
2009	15th Star Awards Ceremony	Best Newcomer	—N/a	Nominated	
2010	16th Star Awards Ceremony	Best Supporting Actor	The Ultimatum	Nominated	
2010	16th Star Awards Ceremony	Unforgettable Villain	The Ultimatum	Won	
2010	16th Star Awards Ceremony	Favourite Male Character	The Ultimatum	Nominated	
2014	20th Star Awards Ceremony	Best Info-Ed Programme Host	My Working Holiday	Nominated	
