= Perth (film) =

Perth: The Geylang Massacre
- Film poster
- Directed by: Djinn
- Written by: Djinn
- Produced by: Damon Chua; Juan Foo; Duncan Jepson
- Starring: Lim Kay Tong; A. Panneeirchelvam; Sunny Pang
- Cinematography: Goh Meng-Hing
- Edited by: Bin Li
- Music by: Marcello De Francisci
- Production company: Working Man Film Productions
- Distributed by: Shaw Organisation (Singapore); Tartan Films (US)
- Release dates: 28 April 2004 (Singapore International Film Festival); 18 August 2005 (Singapore)
- Running time: 106 minutes
- Country: Singapore
- Languages: English; Chinese; Malay; Vietnamese

Perth: The Geylang Massacre, also known as Perth: The Dream of a Simple Man or simply Perth, is a 2004 Singaporean crime drama film written and directed by Djinn (the pseudonym of Ong Lay Jinn). It stars Lim Kay Tong as Harry Lee, a part-time security guard and taxicab driver in Singapore. He is a self-described "simple man" whose life becomes complicated when he finds work as a driver for an escort service. Its title refers to the Australian city, which is where he dreams of retiring and considers a paradise.

== Cast ==
- Lim Kay Tong as Harry Lee
- A. Panneeirchelvam as Selvam
- Sunny Pang as Angry Boy Lee
- Ivy Cheng as Mai

== Reception ==
Todd Konrad of the Independent Film Quarterly:

Upon first viewing, the film bears more than a striking resemblance to Taxi Driver in both story and tone. Its themes of loneliness and redemption through violence shine through brightly. However, upon further examination both works begin to diverge. Harry, unlike Travis Bickle, is an individual nearing the end of the line both spiritually and physically as he watches the world move without him. Lim plays Harry with a world-weary resolve that is both calming and all the more disturbing when he lashes out in quick, violent bursts of aggression.

Brian Holcomb of PopMatters:

While it has been compared to Martin Scorsese's 1976 classic, Taxi Driver, Perth is really quite different. It's clear that Djinn knows that he is making a similar story and he plays a subtle game with his predecessor the way Stephen King played with the template of Bram Stoker's Dracula in his novel, Salem's Lot. But the key difference is that Travis Bickle was a cipher living only in the present, while Harry Lee is a man defined by his past.
