= The Photograph (2007 film) =

- Film poster
- Directed by: Nan Achnas
- Written by: Nan Achnas
- Produced by: Shanty Harmayn; Paquita Widjaja
- Starring: Shanty; Lim Kay Tong; Lukman Sardi; Indy Barends
- Release date: July 5, 2007
- Country: Indonesia
- Language: Bahasa Indonesia

The Photograph is a 2007 Indonesian film directed by Nan Achnas. The film won the 2008 Special Jury Prize at the 43rd Karlovy Vary International Film Festival and the NETPAC Award at the Taipei Golden Horse Film Festival 2008.

== Synopsis ==
Sita is a karaoke bar hostess and a prostitute. When she is beaten up by a group of drunken men, she is saved by Johan. Johan is an old Chinese-Indonesian who is traveling as a photographer. Then Sita offers herself as Johan's servant without being paid. Sita doesn't know that their relationship will change their lives.

== Cast ==
- Shanty
- Lim Kay Tong
- Lukman Sardi
- Indy Barends
