= Star Awards for Best Info-Ed Programme Host =

Singaporean television award (2009–2015)

Star Awards for Best Info-Ed Programme Host 最佳资讯节目主持人
- Awarded for: Best Performance by a Mediacorp Host in an Info-Ed Programme
- Country: Singapore
- Presented by: Mediacorp
- First award: 2009
- Final award: 2015
- Currently held by: Vacant

The Star Awards for Best Info-Ed Programme Host was an award presented annually at the Star Awards, a ceremony that was established in 1994.

The category was introduced in 2009, at the 15th Star Awards ceremony; Belinda Lee received the award for her performance in Come Dance with Me and it is given in honour of a Mediacorp host who has delivered an outstanding performance in an info-ed programme. The nominees were determined by a team of judges employed by Mediacorp; winners are selected by a majority vote from the entire judging panel.

Since its inception, the award was given to six hosts. Quan Yi Fong is the most recent and final winner in this category for her performance in Where to Stay. Belinda Lee is the only host to win in this category twice. Guo Liang and Bryan Wong were nominated on five occasions, more than any other host. Guo also holds the record for the most nominations without a win.

The award was discontinued from 2016 as all performances in the hosting category (variety, info-ed) were shifted to the newly formed Best Programme Host category.

== Recipients ==
Year	Host	Title	Nominees
2009	Belinda Lee 李心钰	Come Dance with Me 与心共舞	Leelian Chua 蔡礼莲 — Food Old Days 寻找原之味; Guo Liang 郭亮 — Breaking Barriers 亮点人生–真情无障碍; Dasmond Koh 许振荣 — Tourism Insiders 旅游线上我在行; Belinda Lee 李心钰 — Find Me a Singaporean 2 稀游记2; Lim Peifen 林佩芬 — So Simple 简单就是美
2010	Bryan Wong 王禄江	Food Hometown 2 美食寻根2	Chew Chor Meng 周初明 — Food Hometown 2 美食寻根2; Michelle Chia 谢韵仪 — Stars for a Cause 明星志工队; Guo Liang 郭亮 — Stars for a Cause 明星志工队; Pornsak — Stars for a Cause 明星志工队
2011	Joanne Peh 白薇秀	The Activist's Journey 仁心侠旅	Guo Liang 郭亮 — Legendary Cuisines 传说中的料理; Belinda Lee 李心钰 — Stars for a Cause 2 明星志工队2; Mark Lee 李国煌 — Behind Every Job 美差事.苦差事; Bryan Wong 王禄江 — Behind Every Job 美差事.苦差事
2012	Lee Teng 李腾	Let's Talk 2 你在囧什么？！2	Guo Liang 郭亮 — Legendary Cuisines II 传说中的料理II; Christopher Lee 李铭顺 — The Adventures of Chris 阿顺历险记; Mark Lee 李国煌 — Behind Every Job 2 美差事.苦差事2; Bryan Wong 王禄江 — Behind Every Job 2 美差事.苦差事2
2013	Belinda Lee 李心钰	Find Me a Singaporean 3 稀游记3	Guo Liang 郭亮 — Project i Season 2 企业i计划2; Lee Teng 李腾 — Life's Big Factories 巨工厂; Lim Peifen 林佩芬 — Let's Talk 3 你在囧什么？！3; Bryan Wong 王禄江 — Makan Unlimited 新马美食一家亲
2014	Cavin Soh 苏梽诚	Let’s Cook 全民新煮艺	Ian Fang 方威捷 — My Working Holiday 打工看世界; Lee Teng 李腾 — Big Factories 2: Made by Singapore! 巨工厂2 - 新加坡出品; Jerry Yeo 杨伟烈 — Big Factories 2: Made by Singapore! 巨工厂2 - 新加坡出品; Youyi 有懿 — Smart @ Work 上班不留白
2015	Quan Yi Fong 权怡凤	Where to Stay 到底住哪里？	Pornsak — Shop Stories 有故事的店; Bryan Wong 王禄江 — Hear Me Out 有话要说; Ben Yeo 杨志龙 — Meet My Family 2 人气满屋2; Youyi 有懿 — My HeARTland Carnival 邻邻艺计划

^{^[I]} Each year is linked to the article about the Star Awards held that year.

== Category facts ==
Most wins

Rank	1st
Host	Belinda Lee
Total wins	2 wins

Most nominations

Rank	1st	2nd	3rd	4th
Host	Guo Liang; Bryan Wong	Belinda Lee	Lee Teng	Mark Lee; Lim Peifen; Pornsak; Youyi
Total nominations	5 nominations	4 nominations	3 nominations	2 nominations
