= Duncan Jepson =

British solicitor

Duncan Jepson is a British solicitor based in Hong Kong, founder of Project Share, a program for poor youth in Hong Kong, a documentary filmmaker, and novelist.

As of 2021, he is the managing director of Liberty Shared, "a campaign group against modern day slavery" in such industries as fashion and palm oil.

== Filmography ==
Year	Title	Director	Writer	Producer	Notes	Ref(s)
2001	Return to Pontianak			Yes		
2004	Perth			Yes		
2004	Rice Rhapsody			Yes	executive producer and co-producer	
2006	Follow Your Heart: China's New Youth Movement	Yes	Yes	Yes		
2009	Hope Without Future?	Yes	Yes	Yes		

== Novels ==
- Emperors Once More (Quercus, 2014)
- All the Flowers in Shanghai (William Morrow, 2011)
- Darkness Outside the Night, illustrated by Xie Peng aka Eliparvic Xie by Louisa Lim. National Public Radio. May 29, 2013. Accessed March 3, 2021. (Tabella Publishing, 2012)
