= BRA (TV series) =

- 内在美
- Genre: Family; Romance; Medical Drama
- Created by: Jaya Rathakrishnan
- Written by: Jaya Rathakrishnan
- Directed by: Kabir Bhatia; Don Aravind
- Starring: Beatrice Chia; Belinda Lee; Dhaya Nambiar; Jimmy Taenaka; Jason Godfrey; Koh Chieng Mun; Esther Yeo; Saina; Karen Tan; Chiew Wei; Gabriel Irons
- Opening theme: Crowns by Jean Tan
- Country of origin: Singapore
- Original language: English
- No. of episodes: 13

Production
- Executive producers: Jaya Rathakrishnan; Abbas Akbar
- Producer: Manju Balakrishnan
- Production locations: Singapore; Malaysia
- Running time: approx. 46 minutes

Original release
- Network: Mediacorp Channel 5
- Release: October 23 – November 13, 2017

BRA (Chinese: 内在美) is a 13 episode mini-series produced by Mediacorp Channel 5. The show was inspired by real-life cancer survivors and airs Mondays to Thursdays at 10pm.

== Cast ==
=== Main cast ===
- Beatrice Chia as Alexis Chua, Head of Oncology at Republic Hospital
- Belinda Lee as Brenda Low, beauty pageant winner, social worker and social media influencer
- Dhaya Nambiar as Rathika Rajan, aspiring actress
- Jimmy Taenaka as Adrian Tan, husband of Brenda
- Jason Godfrey as Herman Yap, in love with Alexis, doctor at Republic Hospital
- Koh Chieng Mun as Mdm Sophia, mother of Alexis, has Alzheimer's

=== Supporting cast ===
- Randall Tan as Chua Hock Heng, father of Alexis, former doctor at Republic hospital
- Steve Yap as Chua Hock Hin, son of Hock Heng
- James Kumar as Surya, longtime friend of Rathika
- Tan Kheng Hua as Gloria Yap Edwards, mother of Herman
- Beau Di Orazio as Brenda’s International Photographer

== Production ==
The show was filmed in Kuala Lumpur, Malaysia also.
