= The Ultimatum (Singaporean TV series) =

Singaporean Chinese drama

- 双子星
- Genre: Drama serial
- Written by: Ng Kah Huay 黄佳华
- Directed by: Chia Mien Yang 谢敏洋; Loo Yin Kam 卢燕金; Wong Foon Hwee 黄芬菲
- Starring: Li Nanxing; Zoe Tay; Fann Wong; Tay Ping Hui; Felicia Chin; Elvin Ng; Zhang Zhenhuan
- Opening theme: 寂寞光年 by Liu Liyang
- Ending theme: 不死心还在 by Power Station (No commentaries for News 8 at Ten)
- Country of origin: Singapore
- Original language: Chinese
- No. of episodes: 30

Production
- Producer: Chia Mien Yang 谢敏洋
- Running time: approx. 45 minutes per episode

Original release
- Network: MediaCorp Channel 8
- Release: 27 May – 7 July 2009

Related
- My School Daze; My Buddy

The Ultimatum (Chinese: 双子星) is a Singaporean Chinese drama which was telecast on Singapore's free-to-air channel, MediaCorp Channel 8. It made its debut on 27 May 2009 and ended on 7 July 2009. This drama serial consists of 30 episodes and was screened on weekdays at 9:00 pm. Being the mid-year Channel 8 blockbuster of 2009, it was the first Channel 8 drama to be fully filmed in HD.

This is the first series to have no commentaries for News 8 at 10, due to the promotion of services by SingTel, the presenter of the series. Despite being touted as the 2009 blockbuster of the year and featuring many established actors and actresses like Zoe Tay, Li Nanxing and Fann Wong (often referred to in the press as a "Two Queen and One King" billing), the show's reception was lukewarm. Many viewers faulted the serial for improbable casting; Lin Meijiao was cast as Tay's mother, despite being only five years older than Tay in real life. Furthermore, the two had acted as sisters before in My Mighty-in-Laws.

The series also came under harsh criticism for being overly melodramatic and for a lack of originality in certain parts of the scripting. However, the performances of newcomers such as Jerry Yeo, who played an antagonist for the first time, were widely praised. In 2022, the series was released on the streaming service Netflix.

== Plot ==
The beginning was seen to be the ending of the drama, where Ye Yuchen was kidnapping Zhou Zhida, and Fang Songqiao received a call from her to meet at a dilapidated field. Sun Jie was to accompany her. She arrived not knowing that she wanted revenge for her family. Songqiao assured her that she was not the murderer. Not listening to her explanation, Yuchen fires from her gun.

Years ago, Ye Songnian (Chen Shucheng), the boss of Phoenix Corporation, raped his employee, Zheng Wenyu (Hong Huifang), who was already pregnant with her husband's child at that time. Months later, both Wenyu and Songnian's second wife, Suzhen (Lin Meijiao), give birth to daughters in the same hospital and due to the nurses' negligence, the identities of the baby girls were swapped. Wenyu discovers that her biological daughter suffers from congenital heart disease. Out of a mother's desire for her child to receive the best medical care coupled with hatred towards Songnian, she decided to capitalize on the situation by perpetuating the mistake. Thus, Ye Yuchen (Zoe Tay) and Fang Songqiao (Fann Wong), whose identities were swapped, grew up in two disparate environments.

In his old age, Songnian goes into semi-retirement, having handed the running of his company to his god-sister (Jiang Ruolin) and sons (Renxiao and Renyi). Ruolin's son, Rende, works in Songnian's company. Yuchen also holds the position of an AVP. On the surface, the family seems to be harmonious. However, beneath this facade, everyone is eying Songnian's position, clamouring to gain Songnian's favour so that they might be entrusted with an important role in the company. Having grown-up in such a scheming and manipulative environment, Yuchen's survival instincts are honed.

Songqiao's childhood, on the other hand, was filled with unhappiness. Wen Yu vents her hatred towards Songnian on her. She was often scolded and beaten for every little mistake she made. Songqiao, who was close to her foster father, bears with it in silence and grows up to be a lawyer. When Songqiao was young, she had an extraordinary encounter with a boy, Sun Jie (Tay Ping Hui). Sun Jie's father, Sun Nanhai, had been a con man and was made a scapegoat in a kidnap. The young Sun Jie resorted to theft to support his younger sister, Sun Min (Felicia Chin), until he became Songnian's foster son. He and Yuchen get along very well.

Over 20 years later, the girls, whose identities had been swapped at birth, get acquainted with a molest case.

Yuchen's godbrother, Rende (Jerry Yeo), molests an employee, Anqi. The righteous Songqiao takes Rende to court. Ruolin is worried that Songnian might learn about the case. Yuchen volunteers to resolve the issue. Yuchen initiates an out-of-court settlement and demands a huge compensation but Songqiao is persistent on hauling Rende to court. Though on opposing ends, the girls could not help but admire the other's strength and character.

Phoenix Corporation has grown into a conglomerate over the years; its business includes overseas casinos and luxurious cruise. The aged Songnian is undecided who should be his successor. Songnian's oldest son had been killed in a botched-up kidnap years ago (unknown to all, this has been Ruolin's doing). The second son Renxiao, is secretly obsessed with Ruolin and blindly supports everything she does, pushing for Rende's succession of Songnian's empire and treating his own wife, Yuki, coldly. Su Zhen's son with Songnian, Renyi, is ambitious but incapable, often messing up what he sets out to achieve. Fortunately for him, Yuchen is always at hand to help clear his mess.

Yuchen grew up in an environment of distrust and she is constantly embroiled in vicious struggles with Ruolin's clique. Due to her ability to keep her cool and turn situations around, she finally gains her father's trust and becomes the CEO of Phoenix Corporation.

Yuchen had had an unforgettable relationship. Three years ago, she met the famous Zhang Feng (Li Nanxing), dubbed as God of Gamblers, in Macau and had planned to marry him. However, he vanished on the eve of their wedding and was never seen again. Rumour has it that he has been killed by his enemies. Yuchen refuses to believe those rumours and she continues to harbour the hope of his return. She meets Zhou Zhida (Li Nanxing), who bears an uncanny resemblance to Zhang Feng (though the two are polar opposites in all other areas), and is convinced that the two are the same person.

Da is a bona fide gambling addict who is skilled in all forms of the vice and has problems keeping a job. Helpless, his wife (Bao) recommends him for the job of a cleaner at the café where she works. Yuchen is convinced that A-Da is Zhang Feng, who might have suffered from amnesia due to some accident, but the latter does not even know her.

Sun Min (Felicia Chin) is Sun Jie's younger sister and has been a fan of the art of gambling since she was young. She had aspired to learn from the God of Gamblers and upon a chance encounter with Da, becomes obstinately convinced (like Yuchen) that A-Da is the God of Gamblers. To her, this is God-sent and knowing that the God of Gamblers does not accept female disciples, she hits upon the crazy idea of male impersonation, entering the cafés' service disguised as a man hoping to learn to gamble from Da.

The master baker at the café is Fang Songqing (Zhang Zhenhuan), Songqiao's younger brother, who has been nicknamed Prince Cake because of his strapping good looks. “Infiltrating” the café as a guy, Sun Min thinks otherwise. To her, he is no more than a simple and honest guy whose world revolves around cakes. Unknowingly, they start to develop feelings for each other. As Songqing has yet to realize Sun Min's gender, hilarious situations occur. After he discovered Sun Min's real gender, he fell in love with her. But, just as they started accepting each other, Rende "kidnapped" Sun Min and tortured her, causing her to be depressed and lose her sanity. She even beats up Songqing.

Da starts to become confused. He's been directionless all his life, and due to Yuchen and Sun Min's persistence that he is the God of Gambler, he begins to question his own identity. He starts to believe he might be the God of Gamblers, and that he had suffered from amnesia due to an accident and that Bao had rescued him and brought him to Singapore to escape the feud in Macau. He subconsciously eases into the role of the God of Gamblers. Not known to all, Da is not Zhang Feng and the real Zhang Feng later came back.

Songqiao meets Sun Jie again and the latter falls in love with her. Songqiao is unaware that Sun Jie is a prodigious thief until the appearance of the Interpol, He Chaoqun (Terence Cao). He Chaoqun is seemingly interested in Songqiao and is determined to nab Sun Jie. Songqiao makes the painful decision of ending her budding relationship with Sun Jie upon realization of his identity. Sun Jie loses his “gift for theft” to a hand injury during an accident, plunging him into the abyss of despair.

After exchanging her daughter for Songnian's all those years back, Wen Yu has been secretly concerned about her daughter. She tries to get close to Yuchen. Unable to contain her emotions any longer, she finally blurts out Yuchen's real identity, much to Yuchen's shock. After regaining her composure, Yuchen is thrust into an emotional turmoil. For the power and status that she has fought so hard to gain, she cannot reveal her real identity, especially to the Ye family. She schemes to prevent Wen Yu from divulging the secret and at the same time, fends against Songqiao, trying to obviate her contact with Songnian to prevent her from knowing the truth. She even causes Wen Yu's death accidentally in her attempt to stop the latter from telling the truth. Hence, her life starts to go into turmoil. But, little does she know that the recorded video is saved inside a handphone which is seen by Songnian, Renyi, Suzhen, and Zhida.

In the course of Chaoqun's investigation into Wenyu's death leads to the unraveling of her rape by Songnian. Songqiao vows to bring Songnian to justice, but stumbles upon the shocking revelation of her true parentage and is confused. Yuchen's true colours are revealed and this kindles Songqiao's suspicion that the former had been behind the deaths of Wen Yu and Renyi.

Da cannot bear to see Yuchen isolated and steeped in her criminal ways. Thus, he chooses to stay guard by her side though deep inside, he knows that Yuchen would ultimately trudge upon the path of no return.

== Cast ==
- Li Nanxing as Zhang Feng / Zhou Zhida
- Zoe Tay as Ye Yuchen
- Fann Wong as Fang Songqiao
- Tay Ping Hui as Sun Jie
- Felicia Chin as Sun Min
- Elvin Ng as Ye Renyi
- Terence Cao as He Chaoqun
- Chen Shucheng as Ye Songnian
- Lin Meijiao as Shen Suzhen
- Constance Song as Jiang Ruolin
- Hong Huifang as Zheng Wenyu
- Cynthia Koh as Chen Xiaobao
- Zhang Zhenhuan as Fang Songqing
- Jerry Yeo as Ye Rende
- Lynn Poh 傅芳仪 as Yuki
- Benedict Goh as Ye Renxiao
- Zhang Xinxiang

== Episodes ==
No.	Title	Original release date
1	"Episode 1"	May 27, 2009
2	"Episode 2"	May 28, 2009
3	"Episode 3"	May 29, 2009
4	"Episode 4"	June 1, 2009
5	"Episode 5"	June 2, 2009
6	"Episode 6"	June 3, 2009
7	"Episode 7"	June 4, 2009
8	"Episode 8"	June 5, 2009
9	"Episode 9"	June 8, 2009
10	"Episode 10"	June 9, 2009
11	"Episode 11"	June 10, 2009
12	"Episode 12"	June 11, 2009
13	"Episode 13"	June 12, 2009
14	"Episode 14"	June 15, 2009
15	"Episode 15"	June 16, 2009
16	"Episode 16"	June 17, 2009
17	"Episode 17"	June 18, 2009
18	"Episode 18"	June 19, 2009
19	"Episode 19"	June 22, 2009
20	"Episode 20"	June 23, 2009
21	"Episode 21"	June 24, 2009
22	"Episode 22"	June 25, 2009
23	"Episode 23"	June 26, 2009
24	"Episode 24"	June 29, 2009
25	"Episode 25"	June 30, 2009
26	"Episode 26"	July 1, 2009
27	"Episode 27"	July 2, 2009
28	"Episode 28"	July 3, 2009
29	"Episode 29"	July 6, 2009
30	"Episode 30"	July 7, 2009

== Accolades ==
Year	Ceremony	Award	Nominee	Result	Ref
2010	Star Awards	Best Theme Song	《寂寞光年》 by Jade Liu	Nominated	
2010	Star Awards	Unforgettable Villain	Jerry Yeo	Won	
2010	Star Awards	Unforgettable Villain	Constance Song	Nominated	
2010	Star Awards	Favourite Female Character	Felicia Chin	Nominated	
2010	Star Awards	Favourite Female Character	Fann Wong	Nominated	
2010	Star Awards	Favourite Male Character	Jerry Yeo	Nominated	
2010	Star Awards	Best Actor	Tay Ping Hui	Nominated	
2010	Star Awards	Best Supporting Actor	Jerry Yeo	Nominated	
2010	Star Awards	Best Supporting Actress	Constance Song	Won	

== See also ==
- List of programmes broadcast by Mediacorp Channel 8
