= Soup of Life =

- 砂煲肉骨茶
- Genre: Family; Melodrama; Food
- Story by: Ding Yun
- Starring: Yao Wenlong; Ann Kok; Belinda Lee; Terence Cao; Nat Ho; Zhou Ying; Jerry Yeo; Lin Meijiao
- Opening theme: 人生闲聊话 by Joshua Foo
- Ending theme: 爱你 by Peter Tan and Wei En 花月正良宵 by Ling Xiao
- Countries of origin: Malaysia; Singapore
- Original language: Mandarin
- No. of episodes: 25

Production
- Executive producer: Yeo Saik Pin
- Production locations: Kuala Lumpur, Malaysia
- Running time: approx. 45 minutes (excluding advertisements)

Original release
- Network: Mediacorp Channel 8 (Singapore)
- Release: 5 February – 11 March 2014

Related
- Yes We Can!; The Caregivers

Soup of Life (Chinese: 砂煲肉骨茶) is the tenth Malaysian production by MediaCorp Studios Malaysia. Filming began in 2013 and took place in Kuala Lumpur, Malaysia. It stars Yao Wenlong, Ann Kok, Belinda Lee, Terence Cao, Nat Ho, Zhou Ying, Jerry Yeo & Lin Meijiao as the casts of the series. It made its debut in Singapore on 5 February 2014. The show aired at 9pm on weekdays and had a repeat telecast at 8am the following day.

The drama is the third Malaysian production set in modern-day to incorporate Singaporean elements after Break Free and The Enchanted.

As the drama is produced as a Malaysian production, the series was not nominated for any Star Awards, an annual Singapore television award show.

== Synopsis ==
“Life is like a bowl of Bak Kut Teh soup, as one must be able to withstand the test of time to understand himself, and know his own self-worth. Only thus can life be truly exciting!” This was a principle Ah Yuan's mother had told him to live by. When Ah Yuan was young, he was a gangster, and often committed petty thefts. Once when there was a gang fight, Ah Yuan's buddy, Ah Hai, took the blame and pleaded guilty in court in order to protect him.

Ah Yuan was grateful to Ah Hai for his sacrifice, and decided to turn over a new leaf, taking over his father's business of selling Bak Kut Teh at a coffee shop together with his wife, Ah Mei. Ah Yuan was hardworking and honest, and refused to cut corners when cooking his Bak Kut The. He soon had a steady stream of regular customers. However, Ah Mei's ex-boyfriend, Hei Ge, continued to pester the couple, wanting her to leave Ah Yuan and return to him. Once when they were having an argument, Ah Yuan was pushed beyond his limits and scalded Hei Ge. He Ge swore to put Ah Yuan behind bars...

After Ah Hai was released from prison, he wanted to start life anew. When he knew that Hei Ge was causing trouble for Ah Yuan, he looked Hei Ge up quietly to negotiate with him. However, Hei Ge wanted Ah Hai to help him in smuggling, but was stopped in time by Ah Yuan. The two buddies proceeded to work together to put Hei Ge behind bars.

Ah Hai had a lot of difficulty finding a job because of his background, and when he finally found a job as a chef, he met his previous chief, Long Ge. Knowing Ah Hai's capabilities, he wanted Ah Hai to work for him again. However, Ah Hai was very unwilling to return to crime, and kept rejecting him, offending him in the process. Ah Hai had no choice but to open a Nasi Lemak stall at the coffee shop with Ah Yuan's help.

At the coffee shop was a lady selling duck rice named Lin Fang, who was very hardworking, and sacrificed a lot for her family. Her husband, Mark, was bad tempered and abusive as a result of being jobless for a long time, and was having an affair with a bar owner named Amy. Lin Fang was torn between tolerating the affair to keep the family together and confronting him. As Mark was trying to seek Lin Fang's forgiveness, Amy appeared and sowed discord among the family members, causing Lin Fang and her son's relationship to be strained. To get Mark to return to her side, Amy kept causing trouble for the family, and caused the marriage to fall apart.

Having lost her husband, Lin Fang had the help of those at the coffee shop to pull herself together. As Ah Hai helped her repeatedly, the two of them started developing feelings for each other. However, they could not move beyond being mere friends because of their own circumstances. At that time, Ah Yuan was framed for a murder, and was arrested by the police. Knowing that Long Ge was behind it, Ah Hai agreed to work for him in order for Ah Yuan to be released. Thus when Ah Yuan was released, Ah Hai “disappeared” without a word. One day, Lin Fang spotted Ah Hai and discovered that he was working for a gang. This tested their relationship further.

The coffee shop had many different people working together. The lady boss was Yin Jie, who was stingy and calculative, and cared only for material benefits. She was in charge of the stall operators and workers. She had a son and a daughter. Her son was called Jin Mao, and he was idle all day, looking for a way to earn a quick buck. However, his attempts always ended in failure. Her daughter was called Jin Ling, and she was mildly retarded. Thus, she was often bullied. Luckily Ah Hai often protected her. As a result, she regarded him as a hero and often followed him everywhere. Yin Jie's lover was Master Ling, and he was a Tai Chi Master. Master Ling was knowledgeable and often gave advice to the others at the coffee shop.

Paul, who sold western food, met a girl from China called Jiang Hong, and fell in love with her. However, Jiang Hong is only focused on fulfilling her dream to go to the US to dance. In order to earn more money, she went to work at the coffee shop. The son of the coffee shop owner, Jin Mao, fell in love with her and pursued her relentlessly. When he knew that she needed a lot of money, he recommended her a job selling weight loss pills. However, Lin Fang's sister, Lin Zhu, ate the pills and was hospitalized for kidney failure. Jiang Hong was filled with remorse, and Paul stayed by her side to comfort her. Thus, Jiang Hong was touched and decided to accept Paul's love.

At this point in time, Master Ling's daughter, Ding Ding, suddenly returned from the US, and was very liberal and avant garde. This caught everyone off guard. Even though Yin Jie and Master Ling had planned to get married, but because Ding Ding and Jin Mao could not get along, they had to call the wedding off. This made Yin Jie very angry with Master Ling. A downcast Master Ling dragged Paul off for a drinking session, but this resulted in Paul getting drunk and scolding Ding Ding badly when he saw her. When Ding Ding knew of her father's love for Yin Jie, she decided to bring the couple together again, with Paul's help. This incident enabled Paul and Ding Ding to get to know each other.

Jin Mao had always carried a torch for Jiang Hong, and even tried to kiss her forcibly when she was tipsy. When Ding Ding got to know of this incident, she decided to help Jiang Hong take revenge, and framed Jin Mao. As a result, others got to know of the incident and Jin Mao was ostracized and disgraced. Jin Mao hated Ding Ding to the core, and abducted her. What he intended to just be a scare for her spiraled into something much more serious, and the police was called in. Forced into a corner, he had no choice but to turn to Long Ge for help. Long Ge decided to use him against Ah Hai.

After Jiang Hong graduated, she was actively looking for a job in order to gain a work permit to stay in Singapore. With Paul's help, she finally found a job teaching little children to dance. Among her students was a girl named He En Qi, who got a long very well with her. En Qi's father, Mr He, also fell in love with Jiang Hong. This affected her relationship with Paul, who was also being pursued by Ding Ding. In order to let Jiang Hong fulfill her dreams, Paul decided to let Jiang Hong go with Mr He, and during that time, Ding Ding was faithfully by his side, encouraging him to move on from his breakup. Would Paul really be able to let go?

Ah Mei became pregnant, and Ah Yuan's family was filled with joy. However, Ah Mei discovered that she had severe gestational diabetes and was having a dangerous pregnancy. For Ah Mei's sake, Ah Yuan wanted Ah Mei to abort the baby, but Ah Mei was unwilling. Thus the couple labored together to bring the baby to full term. Unfortunately, Ah Mei witnessed Jin Mao committing a murder and became a target herself. Would Ah Yuan be able to protect his wife?

In the aroma of food, and the unique flavor of the coffee shop, many touching stories of the resilience of life are brought forth. In life there are always ups and downs, sweet and sour, but one's strength of character, the ingredients for resilience and perseverance, dictates one's failure or success.

== Episodes ==
No.	Title	Original release date
1	"Episode One"	February 5, 2014
2	"Episode Two"	February 6, 2014
3	"Episode Three"	February 7, 2014
4	"Episode Four"	February 10, 2014
5	"Episode Five"	February 11, 2014
6	"Episode Six"	February 12, 2014
7	"Episode Seven"	February 13, 2014
8	"Episode Eight"	February 14, 2014
9	"Episode Nine"	February 17, 2014
10	"Episode Ten"	February 18, 2014
11	"Episode Eleven"	February 19, 2014
12	"Episode Twelve"	February 20, 2014
13	"Episode Thirteen"	February 21, 2014
14	"Episode Fourteen"	February 24, 2014
15	"Episode Fifteen"	February 25, 2014
16	"Episode Sixteen"	February 26, 2014
17	"Episode Seventeen"	February 27, 2014
18	"Episode Eighteen"	February 28, 2014
19	"Episode Nineteen"	March 3, 2014
20	"Episode Twenty"	March 4, 2014
21	"Episode Twenty-one"	March 5, 2014
22	"Episode Twenty-two"	March 6, 2014
23	"Episode Twenty-three"	March 7, 2014
24	"Episode Twenty-four"	March 10, 2014
25	"Episode Twenty-five"	March 11, 2014

== International broadcasts ==
According to series premiere date:

Country	Network(s)	Series premiere	Timeslot
Malaysia	ntv7	7 April 2014	Mondays to Thursdays 21:30 pm (UTC+08:00)
Indonesia	MediaCorp 8 International	TBA	Mondays to Fridays 20:00 pm (UTC+07:00)

== See also ==
- List of programmes broadcast by Mediacorp Channel 8
