= A Sharp Pencil =

- Directed by: Gallen Mei
- Written by: Gallen Mei
- Starring: Mark Richmond; Beatrice Chia; Lim Kay Tong
- Production companies: BigFish Production; Under Pressure Pictures
- Release date: 24 August 2001
- Running time: 100 minutes
- Country: Singapore
- Language: English

A Sharp Pencil is a 2001 Singaporean crime drama film directed by Gallen Mei that stars Mark Richmond, Beatrice Chia, and Lim Kay Tong. It was the first local film to receive the "NC16" rating.

== Cast ==
- Mark Richmond as Simon Choo
- Beatrice Chia as Tanya
- Lim Kay Tong as Deric
- Edmund Chen
- Irene Ang

== Release ==
The film premiered at the Alliance Française on 24 August 2001. It opened in theatres on 30 August.

== Reception ==
Jenny Kong of Today wrote a mixed review of the film, praising the "rather stylistic" script and the chemistry between Chia and Richmond.

Foong Woei Wan of The Straits Times rated the film 2 stars out of 5 and wrote, "For a film which seeks to thrill and shock us from our complacency, it takes too long to take us there, though, and slackens off along the way."

Tan Dawn Wei of The New Paper rated the film 1 star out of 5 and wrote that it is "neither sharp, savvy nor even gritty". However, she praised the performances of Richmond, Chia and Lim.
