= 43rd Karlovy Vary International Film Festival =

2008 film festival edition

The 43rd Karlovy Vary International Film Festival took place from 4 to 12 July 2008. The Crystal Globe was won by Terribly Happy, a Danish neo-noir film directed by Henrik Ruben Genz. The second prize, the Special Jury Prize was won by The Photograph, an Indonesian drama directed by Nan Achnas.

== Juries ==
The following people formed the juries of the festival:

Main competition

- Ivan Passer, Grand Jury President (Czech-born, USA)
- Brenda Blethyn (UK)
- Ari Folman (Israel)
- Ted Hope (USA)
- Jan P. Muchow (Italy)
- Johanna ter Steege (Netherlands)
- Vilmos Zsigmond (Hungary, USA)

Documentaries

- Jørgen Leth, Chairman (Denmark)
- Sean Farnel (Canada)
- Elda Guidinetti (Switzerland)
- Kanako Hayashi (Japan)
- Erika Hníková (Czech Republic)

East of the West

- Peter Hames, Chairman (United Kingdom)
- Milena Andonova (Bulgaria)
- Éva Bársony (Hungary)
- Annamaria Percavassi (Italy)
- Vratislav Šlajer (Czech Republic)

== Official selection awards ==
The following feature films and people received the official selection awards:

- Crystal Globe (Grand Prix) - Terribly Happy (Frygtelig lykkelig) by Henrik Ruben Genz (Denmark)
- Special Jury Prize - The Photograph by Nan Achnas (Indonesia, France, Netherlands, Switzerland, Sweden)
- Best Director Award - Alexey Uchitel for Captive (Plennyj) (Russia, Bulgaria)
- Best Actress Award - Martha Issová for Night Owls (Děti noci) (Czech Republic)
- Best Actor Award - Jiří Mádl for Night Owls (Děti noci) (Czech Republic)
- Special mention of the jury (ex aequo): The Investigator (A nyomozó) by Attila Gigor (Hungary, Sweden, Ireland) & The Karamazovs (Karamazovi) by Petr Zelenka (Czech Republic, Poland)

== Other statutory awards ==
Other statutory awards that were conferred at the festival:

- Best documentary film (over 30 min) - Man on Wire by James Marsh (UK)
  - Special mention - Bigger Stronger Faster* by Christopher Bell (USA)
- Best documentary film (under 30 min) - Lost World (Letűnt világ) by Gyula Nemes (Hungary, Finland)
- East of the West Award - Tulpan by Sergey Dvortsevoy (Kazakhstan, Germany, Switzerland, Russia, Poland)
  - Special Mention - Seamstresses (Šivački) by Lyudmil Todorov (Bulgaria)
- Crystal Globe for Outstanding Artistic Contribution to World Cinema - Robert De Niro (USA), Dušan Hanák (Slovakia), Juraj Jakubisko (Slovakia), Ivan Passer (USA)
- Festival President's Award - Danny Glover (USA), Christopher Lee (UK), Armin Mueller-Stahl (Germany)
- The Town of Karlovy Vary Award - Armin Mueller-Stahl (Germany)
- Právo Audience Award - 12 by Nikita Mikhalkov (Russia)

== Non-statutory awards ==
The following non-statutory awards were conferred at the festival:

- FIPRESCI International Critics Award: The Karamazovs (Karamazovi) by Petr Zelenka (Czech Republic, Poland)
- Ecumenical Jury Award: The Photograph by Nan Achnas (Indonesia, France, Netherlands, Switzerland, Sweden)
- Don Quixote Award: The Investigator (A nyomozó) by Attila Gigor (Hungary, Sweden, Ireland)
- Europa Cinemas Label: Bahrtalo! (en. Good Luck!) by Róbert Lakatos (Hungary, Austria, Germany)
- Czech TV Award - Independent Camera: Mermaid (Rusalka) by Anna Melikyan (Russia)
- NETPAC Award: Written by Kim Byung-woo (South Korea) & Tulpan by Sergey Dvortsevoy (Kazakhstan, Germany, Switzerland, Russia, Poland)
