= Beatrice Chia =

Singaporean actress and theatre director

- Born: 16 May 1974 (age 52); Singapore
- Education: Convent of the Holy Infant Jesus; Raffles Girls' School; Charterhouse School; Guildhall School of Music and Drama

Beatrice Chia (born 16 May 1974 in Singapore) is a Singaporean actress and theatre director.

She has directed over 40 productions and was awarded the Young Artist Award, Singapore's highest award for young arts practitioners. As an actress, she has featured in Triple Nine and had the lead role in the 2017 medical drama BRA.

Beatrice was the first woman to be appointed as Creative Director of the National Day Parade 2011.

== Education ==
Beatrice had her Secondary school education at Raffles Girls' School (Secondary). In 1984, the year the Gifted Education Program was first implemented, Beatrice was selected to be part of the first cohort of students who were recognised to be intellectually gifted. She completed the program in 1990. She went on to Charterhouse, a boarding school in the United Kingdom, before auditioning successfully for the Guildhall School of Music and Drama.

== Career ==
A well-known face on television from 1998 to 2001, Beatrice was best known for her role in Mediacorp Channel 5 police drama Triple Nine.

A familiar figure in the theatre scene, Beatrice won the Life! Theatre Award for Best Actress for her role in Dead Certain, playing a paraplegic obsessed with taking revenge on the man who caused her paralysis.

In 2001, Beatrice started directing. Her directorial debut was Shopping and F***ing, which opened to critical acclaim and she was awarded the Life! Theatre Award for Best Director for it. In 2003, Beatrice's production of Martin Sherman’s famous play Bent, about the persecution of gays in Nazi Germany, won the Life! Theatre Award for Best Production. Her other theatre productions include Les Liaisons Dangereuses, Cabaret the Musical, and more recently, ArmyDaze by Michael Chiang and Tropicana the Musical.

In 2011, Beatrice became the first female creative director to helm the National Day Parade. During the Parade, the Funpack Song using Lady Gaga's Bad Romance became a subject of controversy, causing it to be dropped.

In 2015, Beatrice was appointed the Creative Director of the Opening and Closing Ceremonies of the South-East Asian Games 2015.

In 2016, Beatrice was appointed for the second time, the Creative Director of the National Day Parade. The Parade was held at the National Stadium. She also served as the Creative Director of the inaugural Civic District Outdoor Festival.

In 2017, Beatrice returned to acting after a hiatus of 15 years. She played the lead role of Dr Alexis Chua, in Mediacorp Channel 5's BRA, a 13-part series about breast cancer.

== Personal life ==
Beatrice is married to former radio DJ Mark Richmond. They were married in 2006 and have a son named Sol, born in 2007. Beatrice also uses the name Beatrice Chia-Richmond in her works.

== Filmography ==
=== Film ===
Year	Title of Show	Role	Notes	Ref
1999	Red Trousers			
2000	Stories About Love			
2001	A Sharp Pencil			
2001	Flat Out For Love		TV movie	

=== Television ===
Year	Title of Show	Role	Notes	Ref
1998	Donny Lee Show			
1998	Triple Nine			
2000	Now Boarding			
2017	BRA	Dr Alexis Chua		

== National events ==
Year	Event	Role
2011	National Day Parade	Creative director
2015	South-East Asian Games opening and closing ceremonies	Creative director
2016	National Day Parade	Creative director

== Awards ==
- 2001 DBS Life! Theatre Award for Best Director for Shopping and F***ing, produced by Toy Factory Theatre Ensemble.
- 2003 ST Life! Award for Production of the Year for Bent, produced by Toy Factory Productions.
- 2004 ST Life! Award for Best Actress for her role in Dead Certain, produced by Escape Productions.
- 2006 awarded the Young Artist Award by the National Arts Council.
- 2015 Great Women of our Time by Singapore Women's Weekly
