= Rebecca Chua =

Singaporean writer

Rebecca Chua (born 1953) is an author in Singapore writing in English.

== Education ==
She received an honours degree in English from the University of Singapore in 1976. Chua then became a journalist for Her World magazine. In 1979, she was awarded a Rotary Fellowship in Journalism to pursue a Master's in Mass Communications in the United States.

== Career ==
Five of her short stories were included in the 1976 anthology The Sun In Her Eyes: Stories by Singapore Women. In 1977, two of her stories "The Morning After" and "The Washerwoman’s Daughter" were broadcast over the BBC World Service. Various short stories and some of her poems were included in the Southeast Asian Artistic collection under the auspices of ASEAN (Association of Southeast Asian Nations) anthology Singapore Writing. Her work has also appeared in The Asia Magazine, The Commonwealth Magazine, Female, Her World and The Straits Times. Her first collection of short stories The Newspaper Editor and Other Stories was published in 1981; it received a commendation at the National Book Development Council of Singapore's 1982 book awards.

In 2001, her play Between The Lines was performed at the New Ideas Festival in Toronto. Five other plays have been workshopped in Toronto, and one in Singapore.
