= Irene Lim Kay Han =

Singaporean actress

Irene Lim Kay Han is a Singaporean radiologist and amateur actress.

== Early life and education ==
Lim is the sister of prominent actors Lim Kay Tong and Lim Kay Siu and the cousin of prominent singer-songwriter Dick Lee. She attended Methodist Girls' School. She began acting at the age of six. She studied and worked in England for 18 years.

== Career ==
In October 1986, she portrayed war heroine Elizabeth Choy in the Kim Ramakrishnan play Not Afraid to Live, which was staged by TheatreWorks. The play was her debut with the company. Caroline Ngui of The Straits Times praised her performance, writing that she "gave the character a tensile strength and a rich voice." In November 1987, she played an ageing widow who decides to take up acting in the play Dreamkeepers. Her performance in the play was praised by both Jaime Lye of The Business Times and Miranda Tay of The Straits Times. She portrayed the titular character in the ancient Greek tragedy Medea, which was staged by Asia-in-Theatre Research Centre in February 1988. Judith Holmberg of The Straits Times wrote that Lim was "regal and, at best, calmly controlled", and that "while this rein on her emotions fitted in with that expected of the Greeks' idea of the true civilised person, it seemed hardly the style of a woman driven to contemplate barbaric deeds and beating her breast loudly." In August 1989, she portrayed the Chief Clerk in a Theatrworks staging of the Steven Berkoff play Metamorphosis, an adaptation of the Franz Kafka novella The Metamorphosis. She played Melissa Gardner in the Asian premiere of the A. R. Gurney play Love Letters, which was staged by Action Theatre in February 1990. She starred in the 1991 short film The Nose, which was directed by Ekachai Uekrongtham and premiered at the Singapore International Film Festival. Her performance in the film was criticised by Jennifer Lien of The Business Times, who wrote that Lim was "stilted, especially in the interactive scenes". She played Rita's mother in an adapatation of the Craig Lucas play Prelude to a Kiss, which was staged by Action Theatre in March 1992. Nirmal Ghosh of The Business Times wrote that Lim was "relaxed and refreshing".

Lim has acted in multiple entries in The Squeeze series of plays, which started in 1993. In July 1993, she acted as a film producer in the Dick Lee play Death In Tuas. In a very negative review of the production, Jaime Ee of The Business Times criticised her performance, writing that she "always had a tendency to overact, but this time, she outdid herself." She appeared in the Ovidia Yu play Playing Mothers, which was staged by Action Theatre in January 1996. In August, she portrayed a professor who is going through a divorce and is estranged from her son in the Ming Wong play Ka-Ra-You-OK?. In November 1997, she played a doctor in the Ovidia Yu play Breastissues which was staged by the Singapore Repertory Theatre and directed by Ivan Heng. She initially wanted to turn the role down as she did not enjoy playing roles that are similar to her profession. Elizabeth A. Kaiden of The Straits Times praised her performance in the play, writing that Lim "avoids sentimental indulgence of any kind", and that her "stoic strength balances Png's charming physicality." Her performance was also praised by Bein Munroe of The Business Times. In the same year, she guest-starred in two episodes of the television sitcom Three Rooms and appeared in an adaptation of the Kōbō Abe play Friends.

She played the Grand Duchess in a May 2000 production of the operetta The Student Prince. Sonny Lim of The Straits Times wrote that she was "not quite grand enough and clearly not grand consistently". In September 2001, she appeared in the Henry Ong play Dream of the Red Chamber, which is an adaptation of the Classical Chinese novel of the same name. Jeremy Samuel of The Flying Inkpot wrote that she "has a commanding stage presence but sleepwalks through her role". She played a drunken woman in the Edgar Liao play Ma Goes Home, which was staged by Action Theatre in October 2010 and directed by Samantha Scott-Blackhall.

Lim has worked at the KK Women's and Children's Hospital as a senior consultant radiologist.

== Personal life ==
Lim is married.

On 26 April 2009, Lim was caught drunk driving while on her way to visit her aunt, whose health had begun to deteriorate. She was initially sentenced to two weeks in jail. However, she successfully appealed against her sentence, which was reduced to a $5,000 fine.
