= Nan Achnas =

Indonesian film director

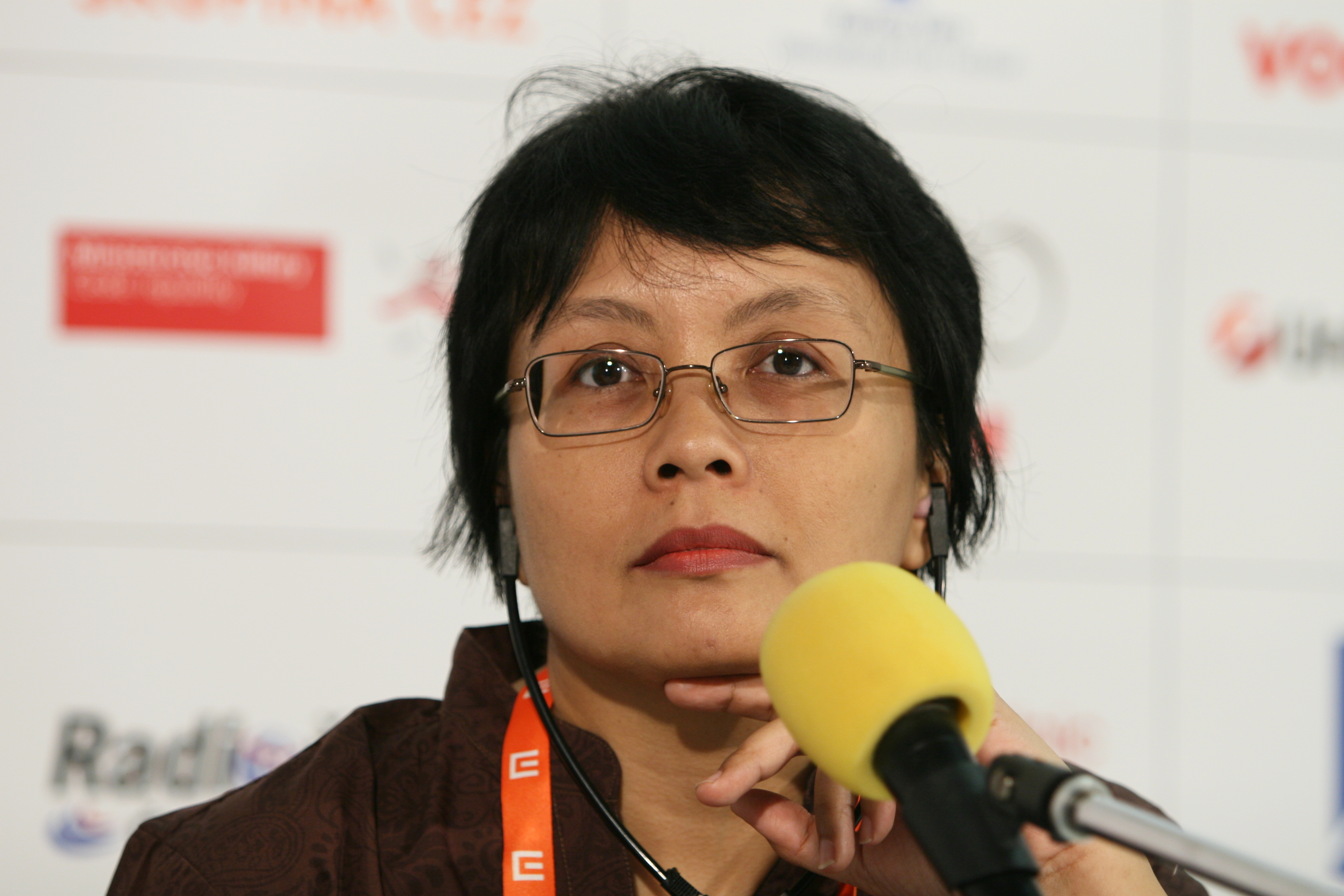
- Born: 1963 (age 62–63); Singapore
- Education: University of East Anglia

Nan Triveni Achnas is an Indonesian film director.

Born in Singapore in 1963, she grew up in Kuala Lumpur, Malaysia. Achnas graduated from the Faculty of Film and Television at the Jakarta Institute of the Arts. She also completed a master's degree in Film Studies at the University of East Anglia in 1996 where she was a Chevening Scholar. While graduating from the University of East Anglia, she directed a film entitled The Only Day (1988) as her diploma film. It won the Grand Prix at the Asian Young Cinema Film Festival in Tokyo. In 2020, she obtained her PhD degree at Nanyang Technological University Singapore with a doctoral thesis on “Experimenting with the essay form and wayang in contemporary Indonesian filmmaking : when shadows are grey”. Apart from directing films, Achnas' teaches film at the Jakarta Institute of the Arts considered as the main film school in Indonesia.

== Film career ==
Achnas first got recognition in 1995 with her short film The Little Gayo Singer. She went forward to direct five other films, one of which she also undertook the role of producer (Bendera, 2002). Nan Achnas, together with Mira Lesmana, an independent producer and director, were actively part of a self-aware film movement regarding the participation of women in film. The movement began through the experimental film, Kuldesak (1998), which they collectively produced near the beginning of Achnas' career.

Achnas, along with other female Indonesian filmmakers, finds it difficult to increase the participation of women in both the political and social realms of life and work to promote gender politics in Indonesia. When asked about facing discrimination as a woman filmmaker, Achnas says:

"Everybody is asking, 'Do you have a problem being a woman filmmaker?' And I say: 'No, should I?' Apparently, there is this brand of feminism saying, 'Do you know why you do not have a problem? Because you are still ... because the system is still not at the stage where men dominate. But when men dominate an industry then you will have problems.' Then I say, 'So far as you know, we are talking about a vacuum of 10 years, where nobody made films and now most of the decision-makers are women.' So there has been no discrimination, nothing." (2013)

When speaking about the difficulties in filmmaking, Achnas claims: “You just have to have staying power and obsession, almost a fixation.” She also has spoken about government funding and the lack thereof in Indonesia. Achnas says:

“In countries like South Korea, like Iran, there’s always some money from the government to make films that are not really for the mainstream market. That is not available here (Indonesia). I make films not purely for the mainstream market (so) I get my funding outside.”

When speaking about making films in Indonesia, she claims “Indonesia is different because we don’t have an Indonesian diaspora, compared with the Indian or the Chinese.”

In terms of the filmmaking world, Achnas is not surprised by the recycling process that is constantly seen in films. She states that, “It was the romantic teenage drama and then the horror genre came and now it's the comedies, and I predict it's probably the erotic films next because history repeats it- self.”

Achnas' admits being against anti-pornography law. This statement was made in regards to the Bill against Pornography and Pornoaction that was passed in Indonesia in 2008.

=== Influences, themes and style ===
Achnas is often regarded as the first woman filmmaker from Indonesia to have a feminist perspective, while many of her films concentrate on the problems of women in Indonesian society. Achnas' films tend to challenge the New Order's gender regime that is prevalent in Indonesia. Her father was a feminist who she often credits for the distinct feminist ideology in her films. The narratives within her films are often formed using a female voyeurism and gaze. Particularly, Achnas’ films feature little sex or violence.

== Filmography ==
=== Director ===
- The Little Gayo Singer (1995)
- Kuldesak (1998)
- Whispering Sands (2001)
- Invisible Garments, Expensive Soles (2001)
- Bendera (2002) and produced
- The Photograph (2007)

== Awards and nominations ==
=== Whispering Sands ===
Asia-Pacific Film Festival (2001)

- Won Special Jury Award

Brisbane International Film Festival (2002)

- Netpac Award - Special Mention

Oslo Films from the South Festival (2002)

- Won FIPRESCI Prize

Seattle International Film Festival (2002)

- Won Asian Trade Winds Special Jury Prize

Pusan International Film Festival (2001)

- Nominated for New Currents Award

Rotterdam International Film Festival (2002)

- Nominated for Tiger Award

Singapore International Film Festival (2002)

- Nominated for Silver Screen Award - Best Asian Feature Film

=== The Photograph ===
Cinemanila International Film Festival (2008)

- Nominated for Best Southeast Asian Film

Golden Horse Film Festival (2008)

- Won NETPAC Award

Karlovy Vary International Film Festival (2008)

- Won Award of Ecumenical Jury
- Won Special Prize of the Jury
- Nominated for Crystal Globe

Kerala International Film Festival (2008)

- Nominated for Golden Crow Pheasant

Rotterdam International Film Festival (2002)

- Won Prince Claus Fund Film Grant

Tallinn Black Nights Film Festival (2008)

- Nominated for Grand Prize
