= North View Secondary School =

School in Yishun, Singapore

Location
- 530 Yishun Ring Road, Singapore 768680; 1.427506°N 103.845086°E

Information
- Type: Government school/mixed school
- Motto: A Vision to Serve
- Established: 2 January 1988; 38 years ago
- Closed: 2017; 9 years ago
- Session: Single session
- School code: 3602
- Principal: Chen Fook Pang
- Slogan: Responsible and Thinking Pupils
- Website: http://www.northviewsec.moe.edu.sg/

North View Secondary School (NVSS) was a government secondary school located in Yishun, Singapore.

== History ==
On 2 January 1988, the school was formed with an enrolment of 483 pupils. Kwek Hiok Chuang was appointed Principal of the school. The school had 35 teaching staff and 12 non-teaching staff. Classes were held at two locations - the Secondary One pupils were housed in Yishun Secondary School while the Secondary Two to Five pupils were in the former Upper Thomson Secondary School building.

The new school building situated at Yishun Ring Road was officially handed over to MOE by PWD on 15 June 1988. The principal, Kwek received the school keys from the PWD representative, Tan Lip Pheow, the Architect-in-charge of the school, on behalf of the Ministry of Education. The school building which costs $7.2m is the S101 model.

On 27 June 1988, the school began functioning at the new premises. The Heads of Department scheme was implemented in the school. On 15 March 1991 the school was officially opened by Mr Charles Chong, Member of Parliament for Sembawang GRC.

On 18 December 1992 Raymond Ong Eng Kong was appointed as the new principal. Ong was from the Public Relations Department, Ministry of Education. Kwek was transferred to Anderson Secondary School as its principal. At the same time Mohd Khairunan Bin Ali was appointed as the new Vice-Principal. On 23 July 1995, Ong died.

From late 1995 to December 1999, Nadarajah Satianathan was the principal of North View Secondary School. From early 1998 to June 1999, two extension blocks were constructed - an admin and a classroom block. The admin-block houses the office, staff-room, library, conference room, computer laboratories and three media resource rooms.

The school was merged into Northland Secondary School in 2017, marking an end to 29 years of the school's history.
