= Assumption English School =

Government aided school in Singapore

Location
- 622 Upper Bukit Timah Road; Singapore 678117
- Coordinates: 1.3681024°N 103.7661047°E

Information
- Type: Government aided
- Motto: Through Work Achieve Success
- Established: 1953; 73 years ago
- Session: Single-session
- Principal: Vincent Toh
- Enrolment: approx. 1,500
- Colour: Blue White
- Website: assumptionenglish.moe.edu.sg

Assumption English School (AES) is a co-educational government-aided Catholic secondary school in Bukit Panjang, Singapore. It is one of the seven institutions governed by St Gabriel's Foundation.

== History ==
AES was founded along Upper Bukit Timah Road in 1953 by the Montfort Brothers of St. Gabriel, as one of the three components of Boys' Town, a charity also run by the Montfort Brothers. It was then known as Boys' Town English School. By 1955, the school was established as a single-session full school with classes from Primary One to Secondary Four. In 1955, the first batch of students from the school sat for the School Certificate Examination.

In 1973, the secondary school section of CHIJ Bukit Timah merged with Boys' Town English School to form a co-educational Catholic school. The new school then took on the name of Assumption English School in honour of the Assumption of Saint Mary.

In 1989, the school decided to upgrade its facilities to better meet the demands of education in the years ahead. In December 1992, the primary school section of AES closed and its students transferred to St. Anthony's Primary School.

The construction of a new school building for AES started in 1993 at a cost of S$20 million. The new building was officially opened on 16 August 1997 by President Ong Teng Cheong.

From 2013 to 2015, the school was upgraded under the Ministry of Education's PRIME scheme at a cost of S$40 million. During this time, the school temporarily occupied a site at Queensway. It moved back to its Upper Bukit Timah Road campus on 28 December 2015 and the upgraded school building was opened on 7 July 2017 by Education Minister Ng Chee Meng.

== Alumni ==
- Dante Chen: WWE Superstar
