= On the Red Dot =

- Genre: Current affairs Info-ed
- Presented by: Cheryl Fox (2012–13, 2014–2016); Otelli Edwards (2013–14)
- Country of origin: Singapore
- Original language: English
- No. of episodes: 166 (list of episodes)

Production
- Running time: 22–23 minutes

Original release
- Network: Mediacorp Channel 5 CNA
- Release: October 31, 2012 – present

Related
- Talking Point; Body and Soul (2014–); Common Cents (2014–2015)

On the Red Dot is a current affairs/info-ed programme formerly hosted by Cheryl Fox and Otelli Edwards. It first aired on Mediacorp Channel 5 on Wednesdays, 9.00pm, beginning October 31, 2012. Repeat telecasts are broadcast on CNA, on Sundays of the same week at 10.30pm.

The show revamped for a new look on April 3, 2013.

From January 1, 2015, Channel 5 will air it at a new time, Thursdays at 10.00pm, and the show was revamped for a new look.

== Presenters ==
Presenter	Episodes presented	Notes
Cheryl Fox	1–9, 11–20, 22–24, 27–30, 77–166	Main host
Otelli Edwards	10, 21, 25–26, 31–45, 48–76	Main host, originally stand-in for Fox
Chan Eu Imm	46 & 47	stand-in for Edwards

== Awards and nominations ==
Year	Ceremony	Category	Nominees	Result	Ref
2023	ContentAsia Awards	Best TV Format Adaptation (Unscripted) in Asia	On The Red Dot: Old Enough	Nominated	

== See also ==
- List of On The Red Dot episodes
