= Belinda Lee (Singaporean actress) =

Singaporean television host and actress (born 1977)

Belinda Lee Xin Yu
- Born: 8 July 1977 (age 49); Singapore
- Other name: Li Xinyu
- Occupations: Host; actress; VJ; writer
- Years active: 2002−present
- Agent: Cross Ratio Entertainment
- Spouse: David Moore (m. 2019)

Chinese name
- Chinese: 李心钰
- Hanyu Pinyin: Lǐ Xīnyù

Belinda Lee Xin Yu (born 8 July 1977) is a Singaporean television host, actress and former MTV Asia VJ.

== Early life ==
In a 2023 interview with infotainment programme Tuesday Report, Lee revealed that she remembered having a very tough childhood, where she was fostered by her relatives when she was an infant and only returned to live with her parents when she was about three. Her family was struggling financially then and that she had poor grades in school. She then joined her school's dance club and it helped her to gradually regain her confidence.

== Career ==
While being a sales executive, Lee joined the MTV Mandarin VJ Hunt audition in June 1998 and won. She then became the first Singaporean to become an MTV Mandarin VJ.

She was prominently a full-time Mediacorp artiste from 2002 to 2017. She has hosted shows including Find Me a Singaporean, The Places We Live In (2013) and Somewhere Out There (2015). In 2014, she was appointed World Vision's goodwill ambassador.

In 2015, her first English book was published; Larger Than Life: Celebrating The Human Spirit features ten extraordinary people who she met in her years spent hosting travel programmes, such as Find Me a Singaporean and The Places We Live In. All royalties will be donated to World Vision.

In 2017, Lee filmed her first English drama series, BRA. She then left Mediacorp as a full-time artiste in upon the conclusion of her contract.

== Personal life ==
In an interview, Lee revealed that she developed a panic disorder between 2011 and 2012 and the condition deterred her from hosting live shows for a period of time. She became a Christian in 2013.

Lee's mother died from breast cancer in 2016.

Lee married David Moore, an American architect, on 27 October 2019.

== Filmography ==
=== Infotainment and variety shows ===
Year	Title	Role	Notes	Ref
2004	School Belle and the Beau 流星花园			
2005	Planet Shakers 自游疯			
2005	Makan King 好吃王			
2006	SuperBand			
2007	Find Me a Singaporean 稀游记			
2008	Find Me a Singaporean 2 稀游记2			
2008	Come Dance With Me 与心共舞			
2010	Stars for a Cause 2 明星志工队2			
2010	RenovAid Season 2			
2011	Show Me the Money 钱哪里有问题?			
2011	Renovaid Season 3			
2012	Find Me a Singaporean 3 稀游记3			
2013	8 Days Eat			
2013	The Places We Live In			
2014	Find Me a Singaporean 4 稀游记4			
2015	Somewhere Out There 地球那一边			
2023	Our Heart Of Care (关爱乐龄)			

=== Television series ===
Year	Title	Role	Notes	Ref
2002	Katong Miss Oh			
2004	Room in My Heart	Ming Xiaoyan		
2004	Room in My Heart	Xiaoli		
2005	Love Concierge	Mei Mei		
2006	C.I.D.	Lu Xiaofen		
2007	Happily Ever After	He Xiangu		
2007	Live Again	Coco Chen		
2009	Your Hand In Mine	Zheng Aishan		
2010	Breakout	Yalina		
2011	The In-Laws	Xiao Fenfen		
2014	Soup of Life	Ah Mei		
2015	Love?	Belinda		
2015	Tiger Mum	Mo Xiaoling		
2016	Peace & Prosperity	Huang Ziting		
2016	Soul Reaper	Carol		
2017	BRA	Brenda Low		

=== Film ===
Year	Title	Role	Ref
2007	Heng or Huat! 天降运财		
2012	Dance Dance Dragon	Midwife	

== Bibliography ==
- 稀游记 (in Chinese). 3角60度制作公司. 2009. ISBN 978-981-08-2279-8.
- Lee, Belinda; Shaw, Juleen (15 November 2015). Larger than Life: Celebrating The Human Spirit. Marshall Cavendish International Asia Pte Ltd. ISBN 978-981-4721-53-0.

== Awards and nominations ==
Organisation	Year	Category	Nominated work	Result	Ref
Star Awards	2009	Best Info-Ed Programme Host	Come Dance With Me	Won	
Star Awards	2009	Best Info-Ed Programme Host	Find Me A Singaporean 2	Nominated	
Star Awards	2010	Top 10 Most Popular Female Artistes	—N/a	Nominated	
Star Awards	2011	Best Info-Ed Programme Host	Stars for a Cause 2	Nominated	
Star Awards	2011	Top 10 Most Popular Female Artistes	—N/a	Nominated	
Star Awards	2012	Top 10 Most Popular Female Artistes	—N/a	Nominated	
Star Awards	2013	Best Info-Ed Programme Host	Find Me a Singaporean 3	Won	
Star Awards	2013	Top 10 Most Popular Female Artistes	—N/a	Won	
Star Awards	2014	Top 10 Most Popular Female Artistes	—N/a	Won	
Star Awards	2015	Top 10 Most Popular Female Artistes	—N/a	Won	
Star Awards	2016	Top 10 Most Popular Female Artistes	—N/a	Won	
Star Awards	2018	Top 10 Most Popular Female Artistes	—N/a	Won	
Star Awards	2021	Top 10 Most Popular Female Artistes	—N/a	Nominated	
Star Awards	2024	Top 10 Most Popular Female Artistes	—N/a	Nominated	
