= Singapore Radio Awards 2010 =

Singapore Radio Awards 2010, was the 5th radio awards ceremony presented by Singapore's MediaCorp. to honour the best radio personalities and radio shows in 2009. After a hiatus in 2008 and 2009, the 2010 show took place on March 13, at MediaCorp TV Theatre. The ceremony also featured a live webcast for the first time.

The hosts for the night were Justin Ang and Vernon A, also known as The Muttons from 987FM. It was their first time hosting the Singapore Radio Awards, as past ceremonies engaged other TV and stage hosts, instead of utilizing talents from within its radio fold.

== Awards ==
24 awards were presented during the show. 987FM was the biggest winner of the night, winning a total of 4 awards, while Vimala from Tamil station Oli 96.8FM won 3 individual awards. In the other categories, Glenn Ong and Cruz Teng won "Radio Personality of the Year" and "Most Popular Radio Personality" for the 4th consecutive time.

Lifetime Achievement Award

- Ibrahim Jamil | Warna 94.2FM

Best Radio Show

- 987FM | Muttons to Midnight | Vernon A & Justin Ang

Radio Personality of the Year – Media's Choice

- ENGLISH | Glenn Ong | Class 95FM
- CHINESE | Dennis Chew | Y.E.S. 93.3FM
- MALAY | AB Shaik | Warna 94.2FM
- TAMIL | Vimala | Oli 96.8FM

Most Popular Radio Personality

- 938LIVE | Stanley Leong
- 987FM | Daniel Ong
- Class 95FM | Jean Danker
- Gold 90.5FM | Brian Richmond
- Lush 99.5FM | Hossan Leong
- Symphony 92.4FM | Loh Sin Yee
- Capital 95.8FM | Ong Teck Chon
- Love 97.2FM | Jeff Goh
- Y.E.S. 93.3FM | Cruz Teng
- Ria 89.7FM | Hafeez Glamour
- Warna 94.2FM | TG
- Oli 96.8FM | Vimala

Most Creative Radio Trailer

- ENGLISH | “UK Top 20” by Shan Wee, 987FM
- CHINESE | “Father’s Day Good Wishes” by Chua Lee Lian, Love 97.2FM
- MALAY | “Libur ke Batam” (Holiday in Batam) by KC & Nity Baizura, Ria 89.7FM
- TAMIL | “Singapore Parenting Congress” by Vimala, Oli 96.8FM

Best Radio Personality Blog

- Rosalyn Lee | 987FM

Best Dressed Radio Personality

- Claressa Monteiro | Gold 90.5FM

== Award Presenters ==
Award presenters included:

- Lui Teck Yew, Acting Minister for Information, Communications and The Arts.
- Lucas Chow, chief executive officer, MediaCorp
- Shaun Seow, Deputy Chief Executive Officer, MediaCorp
- Florence Lian, managing director (Radio), MediaCorp
- Irene Ang, Entertainer

== Guest Performers ==
- Jason Castro
