= Radio in Singapore =

Public radio broadcasting began in Singapore in April 1925 after the Amateur Wireless Society of Malaya obtained a temporary license to broadcast. Radio Singapura was established as the first local mass market radio service in 1959. Subsequently, on 15 February 1963, before the withdrawal of the British Armed Forces and after the merger with Malaya, Singapore's first television service began as Televisyen Singapura (TV Singapura) under its owner, Radio Television Singapore (RTS).

== History ==
=== Initial broadcasts ===
In 1922, a series of government committees were constituted to look into the licensing requirement for receiving, transmitting, and broadcasting radio signals throughout the British Empire. In 1924, only 17 licenses were issued in Singapore, mostly for experiments to ascertain the equipment necessary for wireless transmissions, while the issuance of licenses to amateurs remained suspended. Public radio broadcasting in Singapore began in April 1925, after the Amateur Wireless Society of Malaya (AWSM) obtained a temporary license to broadcast. Operating under the callsign, 1SE (One Singapore Experimental), the station used a 100-watt transmitter lent by the Marconi Company to transmit its signals from the top floor of the Union Building, Collyer Quay. Its first concert transmission was broadcast in April 1925. AWSM would continue to broadcast regular transmissions of vocal and instrumental items by local artists on Friday and Saturday nights, as well as experimental broadcasts on Sunday mornings. The transmissions could be received from as far as Penang, albeit with atmospheric interferences at times.

=== BBC World Service ===
The BBC World Service of the British Broadcasting Corporation (BBC) was inaugurated on 19 December 1932, as the BBC Empire Service, broadcasting on shortwave and aimed principally at English speakers across the British Empire. In his first Christmas Message (1932), King George V characterized the service as intended for "men and women, so cut off by the snow, the desert, or the sea, that only voices out of the air can reach them". First hopes for the Empire Service were low. The Director-General, Sir John Reith, said in the opening program:

Don't expect too much in the early days; for some time we shall transmit comparatively simple programmes, to give the best chance of intelligible reception and provide evidence as to the type of material most suitable for the service in each zone. The programmes will neither be very interesting nor very good.

Since 1976, the World Service has been relayed in FM in Singapore through a long-term partnership between the BBC and Mediacorp.

=== Radio Singapura ===
Radio Singapura, the first local radio service, was launched on 4 January 1959, months before Singapore gained gradual autonomy from the United Kingdom.

Radio Singapura subsequently became part of Radio Television Singapore (RTS), which in turn became part of the Singapore Broadcasting Corporation (SBC). After SBC was fully privatised, it became the Radio Corporation of Singapore (RCS), which would later become the radio broadcasting division of Mediacorp.

=== Rediffusion Singapore ===
With the success of Radio Singapura, another key player in the broadcasting industry in the pre-independence Singapore, Rediffusion Singapore, introduced cable broadcasting service to Singapore in 1949. Rediffusion Singapore brought radio to housing areas which lacked sufficient radio reception with improvements in radio broadcasting.

Radio Rediffusion, the pioneer cable-radio operator on Clemenceau Avenue, continued to operate in the modern era of radio broadcasting in Singapore. However, it was not entirely able to technological advancements over time. Radio Rediffusion operated successfully for several years on a subscription-based model, and while the service did make the digital transition (as well as pioneering the use of encrypted DAB+), it was evident that more changes were needed to maintain the operation. These changes were insufficient, however, and led to it eventually closing down. Its name and assets were sold off in 2012.

=== NTUC Heart (1991-2001) ===
The National Trades Union Congress began planning to operate its radio station in 1990, with the launch set for early 1991. Known as NTUC Radio at the time, it would be broadcast on 91.3 MHz in English and 100.3 MHz in Mandarin, with 10% aside for Malay and Tamil programmes on the two stations respectively. Both stations were the first "wireless" private radio stations in Singapore. Being not profit-driven, the radio stations would have a "social purpose" besides providing entertainment. It planned to compete with SBC and the two radio stations from Batam. NTUC would later adopt the name Radio Heart in January 1991, which was also the name of its sponsored radio programme, "Voice from the Heart", which aired on SBC.

Radio Heart began trial transmissions on 28 January 1991 and launched on 2 March by the secretary-general of NTUC, Ong Teng Cheong. His brief speech at 10:45 am was followed by NTUC's theme song, "Voices from the Heart", requested by Ong himself to the NTUC members.

Radio Heart was operated by NTUC Voice Cooperative Society Limited, which also owned "other communication and publication ventures", with studios located at the basement of Singapore Labour Foundation building at Thomson Road. It operated with an initial budget of $10 million.

By mid-1991, Radio Heart was able to achieve higher number of listeners than those of SBC's, with Heart 100.3 getting 79,000 listeners and Heart 91.3 with 9,000 listeners in the one-hour period between 12 pm and 1 pm.

On 15 July 1991, transmissions of Radio Heart's 91.3 and 100.3 were suspended for 32 hours due to problems with the transmitter at the SLF building in Thomson Road. Both stations resumed broadcasting on 17 July on low power.

In October 1992, Heart 91.3 revamped its programming to shed its "teeny-bopper" image and to appeal to a wider audience, with each programme having a specific theme and play a wide range of music from reggae to country. The changes were not related to the competition with SBC as their target audience was different. By 1992, Heart 91.3 had an average daily listenership of 61,000, or three percent of adults, lower than the Class 95 and Perfect 10.

The Straits Times in 1993 described Radio Heart's programming which include lifestyle, fitness and health, current affairs, education and entertainment.

In July 1993, Radio Heart opened a satellite studio – a "branch" of the main studio – at the Takashimaya complex of Ngee Ann City in Orchard Road, operating from 12 pm to 8 pm. Over four hours of live programming came from the studio, with 91.3 from 12 to 2 pm and 100.3 from 6 to 8 pm.

As part of National Day celebrations in August 1993, 91.3 aired Lion City Heartbeat, airing only Singaporean music throughout its broadcast day, divided into easy listening, blues and alternative. The station collaborated with local magazine BigO for sourcing older music materials and relevant information. The broadcast continued the following year, lasting for 21 hours.

91.3 and 100.3 began 24 hour broadcasting on 1 May 1994. Roland Tan, general manager of NTUC Radio, said that the stations' overnight presenters made the station different to other stations. The response was positive, with callers coming in at 2 am, mostly students in the higher institutions studying for exams and want to relax after studying.

On 3 September 1995, Heart 91.3 relaunched as a station playing adult contemporary songs targeting listeners aged between 25 and 45 to avoid the misconception that the station is for the younger listeners.

In October 1995, NTUC members proposed to Radio Heart to use Standard Malay in its programmes; however it was already implemented. The members also propose Radio Heart to air Malay programmes in earlier slots for the convenience of listeners.

In 1997, Radio Heart 100.3 had a core group of 250,000 listeners aged between 25 and 40 and are blue and white-collar workers. It also had six deejays, each of them had assigned nicknames that end with "Heart". Also around this time, Heart 100.3 and its English counterpart Heart 91.3 were airing a wide range of music, ranging from "pop to alternative to classical" and multilingual programmes that feature English, Japanese, Thai and Chinese-dialect music.

Heart 100.3 planned to give airtime to "other aspects of life" in 1998, including books, theaters and non-commercialised programmes.

MediaWorks had the intention of buying radio stations from NTUC in March 2001, with the creation of a joint-venture between the two, taking over 91.3 and 100.3, then now known as Most Music and Heart FM respectively. The tentative name of the new company was UnionWorks and the relaunch was initially set for the end of May.

Ahead of the relaunch of More Music as WKRZ, SPH MediaWorks announced that it would carry at least 22 hours of syndicated MTV content per week. On 3 October 2001, SPH Radio Broadcasting Arm, a joint management between SPH Multimedia and NTUC Media was launched as SPH UnionWorks; owns, manages, and operates UFM 1003 and WKRZ 91.3FM. Both radio stations were simply re-branded and resume operations of Heart 100.3FM and More Music 91.3FM previously wholly owned by NTUC Media. More Music was given a US-style name, going under the fake callsign WKRZ, and Heart FM was renamed UFM, in a tie-in to Channel U.

=== So Drama! Entertainment ===
So Drama! Entertainment is managed by the SAFRA National Service Association, a non-profit organisation that is dedicated to the welfare of National Servicemen (colloquially called "NSmen"). So Drama! Entertainment runs two stations, Power 98 Love Songs and 88.3Jia, broadcasting in English and Mandarin Chinese respectively. The stations cater to national and professional servicemen, and both radio stations are entertainment-based, featuring modern commercial music and the latest entertainment news.

=== SPH Media ===
SPH Media operates five radio stations in Singapore:

- Money FM 89.3, an English-language business news/talk station which launched in January 2018.
- One FM 91.3, an English-language adult hits station.
- Kiss92 FM, an English-language adult contemporary station which launched in September 2012.
- 96.3 Hao FM, a Mandarin-language classic hits station which launched in January 2018.
- UFM100.3, a Mandarin-language adult hits station.

== Radio stations ==
=== DAB stations ===
Mediacorp used to operate "Digital Radio", a radio service using digital audio broadcasting technology which simulcast eight FM stations, namely Class 95FM, Gold 905FM, 987FM, YES 933, Love 97.2FM, Symphony 92.4FM, XFM 96.3, and 938LIVE and broadcast six digital-only stations, namely Cruise, Club Play, JK-Pop, Chinese Evergreens, Planet Bollywood and Bloomberg.

The service was discontinued on 1 December 2011 due to low adoption of DAB radio. The digital radio standard that was in use, namely DAB, offered lower sound quality compared to FM radio, due to poor performance of the MP2 audio codec at lower bitrates. Although these technical constraints were addressed in the 2nd version of DAB with the AAC+ audio codec, Singapore did not upgrade to the DAB+ standard, unlike the transition implemented for digital television. The prevalence of listening to Internet radio streams on computers and mobile devices has rendered DAB radio irrelevant.

=== Shortwave stations ===
Launched in 1994, Radio Singapore International (RSI) operated as the external service for Singapore. The station launched a signature program in 1996 called 'Friends of the Airwaves' reaching out throughout South-East Asia. The station featured programs in several languages, and was chiefly run by MediaCorp Radio. RSI ceased operation on 31 July 2008.

=== Internet radio ===
In September 2021, IndieGo, the spiritual successor to Lush 99.5FM which closed in 2017, was launched. Similar to its predecessor, IndieGo's music format focuses on local and alternative music. The station also features dayparts of various genres, such as soul/R&B, acoustic/folk, indie pop/electronica, rock, hip-hop.

== See also ==
- Television in Singapore
- List of television stations in Southeast Asia
- Censorship in Singapore
- Communications in Singapore
- Media of Singapore

=== Defunct companies ===
- SPH MediaWorks
- NTUC Media

=== Existing companies ===
- Mediacorp
- SPH Media Trust
- StarHub TV
- Singtel TV
- Rediffusion
