= Golden Mic Awards =

Award show in Singapore

Golden Mic Awards 金唛奖
- Current: Golden Mic Awards 2016
- Awarded for: Excellence in Chinese Language entertainment in Singapore
- Country: Singapore
- Presented by: Mediacorp
- First award: 1998

Television/radio coverage
- Network: Y.E.S. 93.3FM; Capital 95.8FM; Love 97.2FM

The Golden Mic Awards (Chinese: 金唛奖; previously known as Singapore Radio Awards) is an accolade by Singapore's MediaCorp to recognize excellence of presenters and producers in MediaCorp Radio. Although the moniker Singapore may suggest a representation of all radio stations in Singapore, the nominations are only open to MediaCorp Radio stations.

== History ==
Prior to the Singapore Radio Awards (SRA), the three Chinese radio stations (Y.E.S. 93.3FM, Capital 95.8FM and Love 97.2FM) under MediaCorp held their own Golden Mike Awards (GMA). The last GMA was held in 2004 and the SRA was born a few months later to encompass stations from all four languages that MediaCorp broadcast in: English, Chinese, Malay and Tamil.

The first SRA was held in 2005, and was renamed MediaCorp Radio Awards (MRA) in 2013.

== Ceremony ==
The first Singapore Radio Awards ceremony was held in 2004 at Raffles City Convention Centre. It was a trade event, whereby clients of MediaCorp were invited for a formal sit-down dinner. Listeners were not invited to the show.

The second SRA was held in 2005 in Shangri La Hotel's Island Ballroom. The third SRA was held at the same location in 2006. Similarly, only trade clients were invited.

The fourth SRA, in 2007, was held at Suntec Convention Centre. For the first time, listeners were invited to purchase tickets to attend. All nominees were involved in the opening sequence.

The SRA was not held in 2008 and 2009.

Singapore Radio Awards 2010 was held in MediaCorp's TV Theatre, with a live webcast on its official site. Florence Lian, former radio DJ and Singapore Idol judge, currently MediaCorp's Managing Director for Radio, opened the show with a monologue. The hosts were Vernon A and Justin Ang from 987FM. Award presenters included Irene Ang, Bobby Tonelli, as well as MediaCorp's senior management. 987FM were the biggest winners for the night, sweeping "Best Radio Show", "Most Creative English Trailer", and "Best Radio Personality Blog".

Singapore Radio Awards 2011 was telecast live on Channel 5.

MediaCorp Radio Awards 2013 was to be held on 15 November. The show was to be telecast live on Channel 5.

== Nomination ==
All weekday presenters were automatically nominated for the "Most Popular DJ" Award for the respective stations. The results are based on SMS polling.

Nominees for other awards were selected by a panel of professionals in the industry.

== Awards ==
=== Best Radio Show ===
Year	Producer	Radio Show	Language	Station
2005	Lin Lingzhi	Music Diary	Chinese	Y.E.S. 93.3FM
2006	Dongfang Billy	Heart to Heart	Chinese	Love 97.2FM
2010	The Muttons	Muttons to Midnight	English	987FM
2011	The Muttons	Muttons on the Move	English	987FM

=== Radio Personality of the Year (Media's Choice) ===
Year	English Stations	Chinese Stations	Malay Stations	Tamil Stations
2005	Glenn Ong	Marcus Chin		
2006	Glenn Ong	Dongfang Billy	Suriani	Mohd Rafi
2007	Glenn Ong	Dennis Chew	AB Shaik	Saravanan
2010	Glenn Ong	Dennis Chew	AB Shaik	Vimala

=== English Stations Most Popular DJ ===
Year	Gold 90.5FM	Class 95FM	987FM	938LIVE
2004	Audrey Ying	Mark Van Cuylenberg	Carrie Chong	Eugene Loh
2005		Rod Monteiro	Jamie Yeo	
2006	Audrey Ying	Mark Van Cuylenberg	Daniel Ong	Melanie Oliveiro, Eugene Loh
2007	Brian Richmond	Vernetta Lopez	Daniel Ong	Keith De Souza
2010	Brian Richmond	Jean Danker	Daniel Ong	Stanley Leong
2011	Tim Oh			
2013	Vernetta Lopez			

=== Chinese Stations Most Popular DJ ===
Year	Y.E.S. 93.3FM醉心频道	Capital 95.8FM城市频道	Love 97.2FM最爱频道
2004	Dennis Chew	Wang Dicong	Dongfang Billy
2005	Cruz Teng	Wang Lizhen	Chen Hong
2006	Cruz Teng	Wang Lizhen	Dongfang Billy
2007	Cruz Teng	Wang Lizhen	Dongfang Billy
2010	Cruz Teng	Wang Dicong	Jeff
2011	Dennis Chew	Wang Dicong	Wallace Ang
2013	N/A	N/A	N/A

=== Lifetime Achievement Award ===
Year	Name	Current Station
2005	Brian Richmond	Gold 90.5FM
2006	Bala Supramaniam	Oli 96.8FM
2010	Ibrahim Jamil	Warna 94.2FM
2011	Liang Peng	Capital 95.8FM
2013	Suharti Ali	Warna 94.2FM

== Award categories ==
=== Current categories ===
- YES 933 FM Most Popular DJ: since 1998
- CAPITAL 95.8FM Most Popular DJ: since 1998
- LOVE 97.2FM Most Popular DJ: since 1998
- Most Creative Advertisement: since 1998
- Top Listenership Radio Station: since 1994
- Most Popular Group: since 2016
- Most Fashionable DJ: since 2016

=== Sponsored categories ===
- DJ I’d Like to Travel With: since 2016

=== Suspended/retired categories ===
- Best Radio Host: from 2002 to 2004
- Friendliest Radio Personality: from 1998 to 2007
- Radio Personality of the Year (Media's Choice): from 2010 to 2010
- Best Radio Show: from 2005 to 2011
- Lifetime Achievement Award: from 2005 to 2013
- English Stations Most Popular DJ: from 2004 to 2013
