= I Can See Your Voice Singapore =

Singaporean English-language television game show

- Genre: Game show
- Based on: I Can See Your Voice by CJ ENM
- Written by: Vika Nurina Arliany
- Directed by: Lee Chew Yen
- Creative director: Jonathan Glazier
- Presented by: Munah Bagharib; Joakim Gomez
- Starring: Najip Ali; Gurmit Singh
- Country of origin: Singapore
- Original language: English
- No. of episodes: 10

Production
- Executive producer: Lum Wai Loon
- Producer: Jason Goh
- Editor: Kimberly Lau
- Camera setup: Multi-camera
- Production company: Mediacorp Studios

Original release
- Network: Channel 5
- Release: 13 January – 17 March 2025

Related
- I Can See Your Voice franchise

I Can See Your Voice Singapore is a Singaporean English-language television mystery music game show based on the South Korean programme of the same title, featuring its format where guest artist(s) attempt to eliminate bad singers from the group, until the last mystery singer remains for a duet performance. It premiered on Channel 5 on 13 January 2025.

== Gameplay ==
=== Format ===
Over the course of four rounds, the guest artist(s) must attempt to eliminate bad singers from a group of six "mystery singers", identified only by their occupation or alias, without ever hearing them perform live. They are assisted by clues regarding the singers' backgrounds, style of performance, and observations from a celebrity panel. At the end of a game, the last remaining mystery singer is revealed as either good or bad by means of a duet between them and one of the guest artists.

The winning mystery singer, regardless of being good or bad, gets S$10,000 and eligibility for a chance to win a Nissan Leaf.

=== Rounds ===
1. First Impressions
  The guest artists are given some time to observe and examine each mystery singer based on their appearance. Afterward, a muted video of each mystery singer that reveals only 0.3 seconds of their singing voice is played as an additional hint.
2. Lip Sync Challenge
  The mystery singers are divided into batches, (Note: Gameplay note: The Lip Sync Challenge round may perform through a batch of trios or pairs (in a lip sync battle against each other).) and each of them would have to perform lip sync individually.
3. Unlock my Life
  The guest artists are presented with a video package containing possible clues by one of the mystery singers.
4. Interrogation
  The guest artists may ask questions to the remaining mystery singers. Good singers are required to give truthful responses, while the bad singers must lie.

== Production ==
Mediacorp formally acquired the rights to produce a Singaporean adaptation of I Can See Your Voice for English-speaking audiences in July 2024, with the in-house Mediacorp Studios assigning on production duties; thus becoming the first to be locally adapted from a South Korean game show, as well as the international singing-based television programme outright, since Singapore Idol in 2004. (Note: Despite the recognition, Malaysia and Singapore recently co-produced their own Chinese-language adaptation of The Voice, which was broadcast by Astro AEC and Hub E City.)

== Episodes ==
=== Guest artists ===
Legend:
Good singer
Bad singer

Episode		Guest artist (Note: Players' notes: For the returning guest artists (who also include foreigners and former good singers), names are displayed in italics.; For the mixed groups, names who identified as bad singers are displayed in italics.)	Mystery singers (In their respective numbers and aliases)					
#	Date	Guest artist	Elimination order					Winner
#	Date	Guest artist	First Impressions	Lip Sync Challenge		Unlock my Life	Interrogation	Winner
1	13 January 2025	Nathan Hartono	3. Stanly Neo; (Bar Bro)	5. Muhammad Syazwan; (Mr. Entertainment)	1. Jose Morillo; (Coffee Crooner)	2. Odelia Poh; (Tune-time Teacher)	4. Ginny Ng; (Bar-belle)	6. Nadia Asyikin; Hitwoman
2	20 January 2025	Jack and Rai	2. Lucas Wang; (The Next Big Thing)	1. Sara Toh; (Singing Sista)	4. Jeremy Han; (Wedding Singer)	5. Nison Chan; (Shower Superstar)	3. Vanessa Rene; (Fit For a Comeback)	6. Aqilah Mazromi; Indie Chick
3	27 January 2025	Benjamin Kheng, Sonia Chew, (Note: Despite not singing, they were still counted as guest artists.) and Catherine Robert	2. Nur Aishah; (Me Time Mom)	1. Damien Koh; (Magic Mic)	4. Ameerah Muezza; (Great Expectations)	6. Shanna Koh; (Orderly Auditor)	5. Vincent Yap; (Waiting for Fame)	3. Isaac Mak; The Voice of Video
4	3 February 2025	Gao Mei Gui and Zhu Zeliang	1. Cynthia Chua; (Mama Waffle)	3. (France) Amandine Honvault; (Expat Encore)	2. Rohaizat bin Wardi; (Abang's Back)	4. Amanda Victrine King; (Soul Sister)	5. Ong Wei Bin; (Acapella Accountant)	6. Alyssa Ho; Melody Maker
5	10 February 2025	Denise Tan and Sebastian Tan	2. Aries Tan; (Singing Chef)	5. Tai Heng; (Mr. Driven)	4. (Philippines) Glendalyn Morales; (Chasing Melodies)	1. Ramdzan Hasan; (Fighting Frontman)	3. Gabriel Lim; (Wannabe Wedding Singer)	6. (Philippines) Iveca Ignacio; Harmonic Healer
6	17 February 2025	Xixi Lim, Herman Keh, Tyler Ten, and Zhai Siming (Note: Foreign guest artist: China — Zhai Siming)	4. Dylan Yang Hai; (Hip-hop Dancer)	5. Kermaine Lim; (Miss La La Land)	2. Adam Dzulkefli; (One Man Show)	6. Mohamad Amirun; (Triple Thread)	1. Anthea Anne; (Step-up Starlet)	3. Shireen Shahril; Hidden Harmony
7	24 February 2025	Celest Chong and Paul Foster	4. Leon Chng; (Heart of Gold)	1. Rayna Khin Maung Win; (Versatile Virtuoso)	3. Rani Stevens; (Comeback Queen)	6. Zhang Jiasi; (Award Winner)	2. Afif; (Picture Perfect)	5. Cherie Tse; Class Act
8	3 March 2025	Rahimah Rahim	6. Ho Xuan; (Broadway Believer)	4. Noelle Lim; (Rhythmic Runner)	3. Hang Tuah; (Vocal Vigilante)	2. Nur Fazyira; (Love at First Song)	1. Marc; (Raising the Bar)	5. (Philippines) Ronald Joseph; Living the Dream
9	10 March 2025	Tasha Low and Chantalle Ng	6. Erna Goana; (Glow-up Groover)	3. Ashlyn Tan; (Karaoke Queen)	4. Aiman; (Mr. Glamorous)	5. (Philippines) Claire Javier; (Back Burner)	2. Mohammad Rizuan; (Flight of Fancy)	1. Arunditha Emmanuel; Soulful Scribe
10	17 March 2025	Noah Yap and Tosh Zhang	6. Elsa Mickayla; (Musical Climber)	1. Danial Ariffin; (Rocky Rider)	5. Dzikri Jasman; (Football Star)	2. Geraldine Yee; (Chatterbox)	3. Muhammad Farwin; (Daddy Cool)	4. Marae; Pretty in Pink

=== Panelists ===
Legend:
Regular panelist
Guest panelist

Apps		Panelists in attendance (Sorted by first appearance, with episode designations)
g#	p#	Panelists in attendance (Sorted by first appearance, with episode designations)
10	2	Najip Ali and Gurmit Singh (1–10)
3	2	Xixi Lim (2, 7, 10); Benjamin Kheng (5, 7, 9)
1	21	Carla Dunareanu, Shazza, and Omar Kenobi (1); Farah Lola and Fariz Jabba (2); Justine Ang (The Muttons) and Vernon Anthonisz (3); Azura Goh, Ravi.G, and Avery Aloysius Yeo (4); Yasminne Cheng (5); Jernelle Oh and Seow Sin Nee (Note: Panelists' note: Foreign attendees: Joshua Tan (AUS) and Seow Sin Nee (MYS)) (6); Sivakumar Palakrishnan (7); Irene Ang, Das DD, and Suhaimi Yusof (8); Elvin Ng and Sheila Sim (9); Maxi Lim and Joshua Tan (10)
