= Golden Mic Awards 2016 =

Golden Mic Awards 2016 金唛奖2016
- Sponsored by: Love 97.2FM; Radio 80
- Date: 25 June 2016
- Location: Bliss Garden Restaurant
- Country: Singapore
- Presented by: Chan Brothers
- Hosted by: Mark Lee; Guo Liang
- Website: "Official website". Archived from the original on 29 May 2016.

Television/radio coverage
- Runtime: 180 mins

Golden Mic Awards 2016 (also GMA2016, Chinese: 金唛奖2016) is a triple radio award ceremony held in Singapore in 2016. It was the 2016 edition of Golden Mic Awards organised by Mediacorp for free-to-air stations Capital 95.8FM, Love 97.2FM and Y.E.S. 93.3FM.

== Awards Ceremony ==
Top Listenership Radio Station 收听率总冠军	Love 97.2FM; 972最爱频道
Most Creative Advertisement 最具创意节目预告	Nico Chua 蔡伟彬

YES 933 FM Most Popular DJ; YES933最受欢迎DJ: Christina Lim 林佩芬; Kenneth Chung 钟坤华; Jeff Goh; Siau Jiahui 萧嘉蕙; Nico Chua 蔡伟彬; Seah Kar Huat 谢家发; Chen Yanwei 陈彦维; Chen Ning 陈宁	CAPITAL 95.8FM Most Popular DJ; CAPITAL 95.8FM最受欢迎DJ: Lin Lingzhi 林灵芝; Gao Yixin 高逸芯; Pan Jiabiao 潘家镳; Huang Shujun 黄淑君; Bukoh Mary 巫许玛莉; Loo Linxuan 吕霖轩; Li Yisha 李一莎; Wang Deming 王德明; Zeng Shenglian 曾生莲; Liang Ping 梁萍; Qiu Shengyang 邱胜扬
LOVE 97.2FM Most Popular DJ; LOVE 97.2FM最受欢迎DJ: Dennis Chew 周崇庆; Chen Biyu 陈碧玉; Marcus Chin 陈建彬; Violet Fenying 陈粉樱; Wendy Tseng 曾晓英; Reene Yongmei 叶咏梅; Chua Leelian 蔡礼莲	Most Popular Group 最喜爱组合: Chen Biyu 陈碧玉, Marcus Chin 陈建彬, Mark Lee 李国煌 & Dennis Chew 周崇庆 — Morning! YKHK 早安!玉建煌崇; Kenneth Chung 钟坤华, Christina Lim 林佩芬 & Jeff Goh — Great Coffee Together 大咖一起来; Seah Kar Huat 谢家发, Nico Chua 蔡伟彬 & Chen Yanwei 陈彦维 — Best Nightfall Shift 棒棒傍晚班; Gao Yixin 高逸芯 & Pan Jiabiao 潘家镳 — Positive Breakfast Energy 早点正能量; Lin Lingzhi 林灵芝 & Wang Deming 王德明 — Knock Off, MZ! 明芝到，下班了; Violet Fenying 陈粉樱 & Marcus Chin 陈建彬 — Happy Bingo! 快乐彬够!
Most Fashionable DJ 最时尚DJ: Dennis Chew 周崇庆; Nico Chua 蔡伟彬; Seah Kar Huat 谢家发; Loo Linxuan 吕霖轩; Marcus Chin 陈建彬	DJ I’d Like to Travel With 最想和他/她去旅游DJ: Christina Lim 林佩芬; Siau Jiahui 萧嘉蕙; Seah Kar Huat 谢家发; Chen Yanwei 陈彦维; Kenneth Chung 钟坤华; Chen Ning 陈宁; Nico Chua 蔡伟彬; Jeff Goh; Pan Jiabiao 潘家镳; Gao Yixin 高逸芯; Huang Shujun 黄淑君; Lin Lingzhi 林灵芝; Wang Deming 王德明; Zeng Shenglian 曾生莲; Liang Ping 梁萍; Qiu Shengyang 邱胜扬; Loo Linxuan 吕霖轩; Li Yisha 李一莎; Chen Biyu 陈碧玉; Marcus Chin 陈建彬; Violet Fenying 陈粉樱; Wendy Tseng 曾晓英; Chua Leelian 蔡礼莲; Reene Yongmei 叶咏梅; Dennis Chew 周崇庆

== Trivia ==
- Most Popular Group, Most Fashionable DJ and DJ I'd Like to Travel With will be first given out this year.
- Marcus Chin holds the most number of nomination, with five.
- Seah Kar Huat holds the record for the most nominations without a win, with four.
- Dennis Chew, the biggest winner of the ceremony, walked home with three awards: LOVE 97.2FM Most Popular DJ, Most Popular Group and Most Fashionable DJ.
