= Cruz Teng =

- Born: 18 September 1979 (age 47); Singapore
- Occupations: Managing director, DZY
- Years active: 1996-2015; 2025-present

Chinese name
- Simplified Chinese: 丁志勇
Transcriptions
Standard Mandarin
- Hanyu Pinyin: Dīng Zhìyǒng

Cruz Teng (born 18 September 1979) is a Singaporean events, radio and television host and the owner of a content and communications consultancy he founded in 2025.

He made his radio debut in 1996 before he turned 17, and hosted radio and television programmes, as well as entertainment, trade and corporate events from 1996 to 2015 and was a four-time winner of the Most Popular Radio Personality Award at the Singapore Radio Awards. He was head of Singapore’s number one radio station Mediacorp YES 933 from 2013 to 2015.

He left media in 2015 and ventured into the corporate world, where he held senior brand and communications positions in various industries, including land transport, automotive, insurance and banking. In 2022, he was appointed a board member of Singapore-listed NoonTalk Media.

== Education ==
Teng was educated at Anderson Secondary School where he took his GCE O Levels. He completed a Diploma in Business Studies at Ngee Ann Polytechnic in 1999. He enrolled in a part-time bachelor's degree course at SIM University in 2009, and completed his studies in 2012 despite a term’s absence. In 2014, he announced that he was accepted into Nanyang Technological University, to read Master of Mass Communications. He had completed the matriculation process and scored a corporate scholarship, but had to withdraw from the course when it was decided that he would return to the morning show.

== Career ==
=== 1996-2002: Beginnings ===
Teng started his freelance radio career at MediaCorp YES 933 in 1996. A year prior, he interviewed at YES 933 as a student ambassador. Throughout his polytechnic and national days, he hosted weekend programmes and occasionally stood in for weekday programmes. He was given a permanent slot on Sunday mornings to host the Global Chinese Music Chart in 2021.

=== 2002-2015: Full fledged media career ===
Teng became a full-time radio presenter and hosted the evening drive time show in 2022. He then hosted the morning show for the next two years. He repeatedly mentioned on his blog that he was unable to adjust to the demands of the morning shift. He was transferred to the night dedications show in early 2005, before returning to the morning show six months later. The morning show was relaunched in September 2005, and a new era began as the WRM Morning Show became the most listened to morning show across all stations and languages in Singapore. Teng remained as the constant anchor of the morning show from 2005 to 2013.

During this period, he was one of the most recognisable personalities in Chinese Radio. Teng was the first person to host both the local and regional chart shows on the station. He was named Friendliest Radio Personality in 2004, and subsequently the Most Popular Radio Personality four consecutive times at the Singapore Radio Awards. He was also the first male brand ambassador for Bioskin in 2008 and the spokesperson for Singtel AMPed, a digital music download service, in 2009.

Early in his career, Teng was picked to host several large scale award ceremonies. He hosted the Global Chinese Music Awards Ceremony in Shanghai, Taipei, Beijing and Singapore. He also hosted the Singapore Hit Awards Ceremony from 2005 to 2013, and received local and regional award nominations.

Teng was the lyricist of "Passerby/ Lu Ren Jia". It is Hong Kong singer Justin Lo's first ever Mandarin song. He has been a strong advocate of local music. In 2014, YES 933 dedicated a massive amount of air time to promote new local acts. Singapore Hit Awards 2014 also adopted a local theme.

=== 2013-2015: Radio management ===
Teng was made station head of YES 93.3FM in 2013 and stepped down from the morning show to host a 2-hour slot from 10am to 12pm. The following year, he was removed from the weekday lineup, but returned to the morning show with new partners a few months later.

During this period, he chaired the Singapore Hit Awards and Global Chinese Music Awards executive committees, and launched several new programmes and events, including Cycle to Supper. He also launched 933TV, the station’s video production arm.

In an unexpected move, he anchored a television show ‘Mars vs Venus’ on Channel U for the first time in 2015. After news broke that he had stopped smoking, Singapore’s Health Promotion Board named him as ambassador of its anti-smoking campaign.

=== 2015-2025: Corporate ===
After leaving Mediacorp at the end of 2015, Teng held communications and brand roles in different industries. According to his LinkedIn, he had worked for Standard Chartered, Singlife, Eurokars, Tan Chong and SMRT. During this period, he also became a board member of NoonTalk Media, which was listed in Singapore in 2022.

In 2016, Teng published a blog entry to mark his 20th anniversary in radio. He remarked that "it was a shame he couldn't mark this occasion in the studios", and stressed that he "has every intention to go back on air sooner or later".

=== 2025-: DZY ===
On 25 Jul 2025, Teng announced that he was setting up a new content and communications consultancy to "leverage what he'd learnt in media and communications the last 30 years"

His podcast, The DZY Show, was launched on the same day. Regional and local celebrities recorded congratulatory messages. They included Stefanie Sun, Energy, Kym Ng, Hong Junyang, Chabansheng, etc. Within 48 hours, the show ranked #1 in Singapore on Apple Podcasts, surpassing some of the biggest podcasting names like The Diary of a CEO, BBC Global News Podcast and TED Talks Daily.

=== 2026: Back to Radio at Capital 958 ===
On 28 February 2026, at Bishan Junction 8 3楼户外广场, Capital 958 announced 志勇 will be joining Capital 958 radio evening show from 5pm to 8pm on 2 March 2026 together with partner Ling Zhi and part time weekend DJ turned Full Time DJ Su Min. He is currently hosting the radio evening show from 5pm to 8pm.

== Hosting credits ==
=== Radio ===
Year	Time	Programme	Co-host	Platform
2002	5pm- 8pm	Young Guns《青春鸟王》	Chen Liyi	YES 933
2003	7am-10am	Happy Wakeup《快乐起来》	Lin Lingzhi	YES 933
2003-2025	7am-10am	Happy Wakeup《快乐鸟王》	Chen Liyi	YES 933
2005	9pm-11pm	Especially for You《弦歌寄意》	-	YES 933
2005	7am-10am	WRM《就是万人迷》	Lin Lingzhi	YES 933
2006	7am-10am	WRM《就是万人迷》	Lin Lingzhi, Wuxu Mali	YES 933
2007	7am-10am	WRM《就是万人迷》	Cai Weibin	YES 933
2007	7am-10am	WRM《就是万人迷》	Lin Peifen, Chen Aiwei	YES 933
2008	7am-10am	WRM《就是万人迷》	Lin Peifen	YES 933
2009-2011	6am-10am	WRM《就是万人迷》	Xiao Jiahui	YES 933
2012	6am-10am	WRM《就是万人迷》	Lin Peifen, Chen Aiwei	YES 933
2013	10am-12pm	Woohoo Universe《Woohoo全宇宙》	-	YES 933
2014-2015	6am-10am	WRM《就是万人迷》	Xiao Jiahui, Zhong Kunhua	YES 933
2026-	5pm-8pm	《城市HIGH下班》	Lin Lingzhi, Liu Sumin	CAPITAL 958

In addition to hosting weekday shows, Teng also presented other radio programmes which were broadcast at various timings.

Year	Programme	Co-host	Platform
2001-2005	Global Chart《全球华语歌曲排行榜》	-	YES 933
2005-2007	Global Chart《全球华语歌曲排行榜》	Wuxu Mali	YES 933, RSI
2005-2010	Pick of the Pops《醉心龙虎榜》	Chen Liyi	YES 933
2010-2012	Pick of the Pops《醉心龙虎榜》	Xiao Jiahui	YES 933
2014-2014	Pick of the Pops《醉心龙虎榜》	Chen Ning	YES 933

=== Television ===
Year	Time	Programme	Co-host	Platform
2015	Mon 9pm	Mars vs Venus《金星火星大不同》	Xiao Jiahui	Channel U

=== Digital ===
Year	Programme	Role	Note
2025	The DZY Show	Presenter	Podcast
2025	DZY LIVE	Presenter	TikTok

=== Major events ===
Year	Event	Role
2001	8th Singapore Hit Awards 《第8届新加坡金曲奖》	Live Broadcast Host
2002	9th Singapore Hit Awards 《第9届新加坡金曲奖》	Live Broadcast Host
2003	10th Singapore Hit Awards 《第10届新加坡金曲奖》	Walk of Fame Host
2003	3rd Global Chinese Music Awards《第3届全球华语歌曲排行榜》(Shanghai)	Ceremony Host
2004	11th Singapore Hit Awards 《第11届新加坡金曲奖》	Walk of Fame Host
2004	4th Global Chinese Music Awards《第4届全球华语歌曲排行榜》(Taipei)	Ceremony Host
2005	12th Singapore Hit Awards 《第12届新加坡金曲奖》	Ceremony Host
2006	6th Global Chinese Music Awards《第6届全球华语歌曲排行榜》(Singapore)	Ceremony Host
2007	13th Singapore Hit Awards《第13届新加坡金曲奖》	Ceremony Host
2008	14th Singapore Hit Awards《第14届新加坡金曲奖》	Ceremony Host
2008	8th Global Chinese Music Awards《第8届全球华语歌曲排行榜》(Hong Kong)	Award Presenter
2009	15th Singapore Hit Awards《第15届新加坡金曲奖》	Ceremony Host
2009	9th Global Chinese Music Awards《第9届全球华语歌曲排行榜》(Beijing)	Award Presenter
2010	16th Singapore Hit Awards《第16届新加坡金曲奖》	Ceremony Host
2011	17th Singapore Hit Awards《第17届新加坡金曲奖》	Ceremony Host
2012	12th Global Chinese Music Awards《第12届全球华语歌曲排行榜》(Singapore)	Media Centre Host
2013	18th Singapore Hit Awards《第18届新加坡金曲奖》	Chairman and Ceremony Host
2013	13th Global Chinese Music Awards《第13届全球华语歌曲排行榜》(Kuala Lumpur)	Award Presenter
2014	19th Singapore Hit Awards 《第19届新加坡金曲奖》	Chairman and Award Presenter
2014	14th Global Chinese Music Awards《第14届全球华语歌曲排行榜》(Guangdong)	Award Presenter
2015	15th Global Chinese Music Awards《第15届全球华语歌曲排行榜》(Singapore)	Chairman and Award Presenter
2025	Countdown 2026 at The Kallang	Host

== Awards and nominations ==
Year	Event	Category	Result
2002	Golden Microphone Awards	Best Radio Host	Nominated
2004	Golden Microphone Awards	Best Radio Host	Nominated
2004	Singapore Radio Awards	Friendliest Radio Personality	Won
2005	Singapore Radio Awards	Most Popular Radio Personality	Won
2006	Singapore Radio Awards	Most Popular Radio Personality	Won
2007	Singapore Radio Awards	Most Popular Radio Personality	Won
2008	Asia Pacific Radio Awards	Best Radio Drama	Nominated
2009	Asia Pacific Blog Awards	Best Celebrity Blog	Nominated
2010	Singapore Entertainment Awards	Best Radio Show	Nominated
2010	Singapore Entertainment Awards	Best Male DJ	Nominated
2010	Singapore Radio Awards	Most Popular Radio Personality	Won
2010	Singapore Blog Awards	Best Local Celebrity Blog	Nominated
2011	Singapore Radio Awards	Most Popular Radio Personality	Nominated

== Personal life ==
Teng was one of the earliest DJs to begin a blog. He was nominated for Best Celebrity Blog at the 1st Nuffnang Regional Blog Awards in 2009, Best Radio Personality Blog at the Singapore Radio Awards in 2010 and Best Local Celebrity Blog at the omy Blog Awards 2010. He was named Official Blogger for Singapore's National Day celebrations in 2009.

In 2007, Teng fell into a drain and broke five bones in his left foot. He was admitted to hospital and did a surgery the following day. A week later, fellow DJ Dennis Chew also met with an accident. He fell off a bicycle and fractured his arm and suffered other injuries on his face and legs. At that time, they were the only two male DJs in the station, and the event was later ranked as one of the Top 10 Local Entertainment Headlines in Singapore that year.

=== Long-distance relationship ===
Teng admitted to a long-distance relationship on 933TV in 2015, but declined to give further details. In 2018, he said on social media that his ex had died. He followed up with several posts, including flying to Taiwan for the funeral in late 2018, and subsequent visits at the columbarium in Taiwan.

Preceded by new	Singapore Radio Awards Most Friendly DJ; 2004	Succeeded by Bukoh Mary
Preceded by Dennis Chew	Singapore Radio Awards Most Popular DJ; 2005–2010	Succeeded by Dennis Chew
