= Radio 4 =

Radio 4 may refer to:

== Radio stations ==
- BBC Radio 4, a British national public service radio station
  - BBC Radio 4 Extra, BBC Radio 4's sister station
- NPO Radio 4, the former name of Dutch radio station NPO Klassiek
- Radio 4, the former name of Malaysian English-language radio station Traxx FM
- Radio 4, the former name of Singaporean Tamil-language radio station Oli 968
- Ràdio 4, a Spanish Catalan-language radio station
- Raadio 4, an Estonian Russian-language radio station

== Other uses ==
- Radio 4 (band), a New York dance-punk band
- Radio 4, a Public Image Ltd song on Metal Box
