= List of radio stations in Singapore =

The following radio stations are located in and transmitted from Singapore.

== FM stations ==
As of November 2025, there are two licensed broadcasters of terrestrial radio in Singapore, which collectively operate 17 FM stations; 12 are owned by the state-owned broadcaster Mediacorp and 5 by SPH Media. Owing to Singapore's history as a British colony, the English-language feed of the BBC World Service has been available in the region since its establishment, with Mediacorp relaying it as part of its FM services. The majority of radio stations in Singapore broadcast in either English or Mandarin; Mediacorp operates the country's two Malay stations, and one Tamil station.

Foreign stations can also be received from the neighbouring regions of Malaysia and Indonesia, with Singapore stations likewise also receivable in those areas.

=== Mediacorp ===
Mediacorp operates twelve FM radio stations, with eleven domestic stations, as well as a relay of the BBC World Service. The company's digital audio broadcasting service was discontinued on 1 December 2011. Mediacorp's stations dominate listenership in the country, owning all but two of the top ten stations in Singapore based on average listenership according to surveys by Nielsen in 2025, with its stations having an average weekly listenership of 3.94 million in total.

Frequency	Station	Language	Format
88.9 MHz	BBC World Service (Partnered)	English	News and talk
89.7 MHz	Ria 897	Malay	Adult CHR
90.5 MHz	Gold 905	English	Classic adult contemporary
92.4 MHz	Symphony 924	English	Classical
93.3 MHz	YES 933	Chinese	Adult CHR
93.8 MHz	CNA938	English	News and talk
94.2 MHz	Warna 942	Malay	Modern adult contemporary Infotainment
95.0 MHz	Class 95	English	Modern adult contemporary
95.8 MHz	Capital 958	Chinese	News and talk; Classic hits (overnight or public holiday)
96.8 MHz	Oli 968	Tamil	Infotainment; Adult contemporary (Indian pop)
97.2 MHz	Love 972	Chinese	Soft adult contemporary
98.7 MHz	987	English	Mainstream CHR

=== SPH Media ===
SPH Media operates five FM stations:

Frequency	Station	Language	Genre	Notes
89.3 MHz	Money FM 89.3	English	Financial news and talks	Previously carried an audio simulcast of TVMobile (before 2010)
91.3 MHz	One FM 91.3	English	Classic adult contemporary	Previously known as HOT FM, a Mainstream CHR station (before 2015)
92.0 MHz	Kiss92 FM	English	Hot adult contemporary	
96.3 MHz	96.3 Hao FM	Chinese	Classic hits; Infotainment	
100.3 MHz	UFM100.3	Chinese	Adult CHR	Previously known as Radio 1003, and Radio Heart FM 100.3 in 1991

== Internet stations ==
Station	Operator	Language	Genre	First air date	Website
973FM Blasts That Last	Independent	English	Freeform radio (Mainstream CHR/Indie music)	7 December 2010	Link
AXR Singapore	AXR	English	Modern adult contemporary; News and talk	1 November 2016	Link
CatholicSG Radio	Catholic Archdiocese of Singapore	Various	Religious broadcasting	2 June 2019	Link
IndieGo	Mediacorp	English	Freeform radio (Indie music)	13 September 2021	Link (Singapore only)
Radio Chutney	Independent	Hindi; Marathi; Telugu	Freeform radio (Indian pop and indie)	25 October 2020	Link
Radio Masti 24x7	Radio Masti (Independent)	Hindi	Freeform radio (Bollywood music)	1 October 2016 (as Radio Masti 96.3fm with Mediacorp's XFM)	Link
VintageRadio.SG	VintageRadio.SG Ltd	Various	Oldies/Classic hits	16 September 2020–31 May 2026	Link
XRadio	XRadio (Independent; via Second Life)	English	Freeform radio	1 July 2019	Link
883Jia	So Drama! Entertainment	Chinese; English	Soft adult contemporary	12 June 1995–30 October 2025 (as an FM radio station); 31 October 2025–present (as an Internet-only station)	Link (Singapore only)
Power 98	So Drama! Entertainment	English	Adult hits	12 June 1995–30 October 2025 (as an FM radio station); 31 October 2025–present (as an Internet-only station)	Link (Singapore only)
