= List of programmes broadcast by CNA =

The following is a list of programmes broadcast by the Singaporean multinational news channel CNA.

== Documentaries and current affairs programmes ==
Title	Description	Notes	Refs
CNA Correspondent	A weekly programme hosted by various CNA correspondents that examines major global issues.		
CNA Insider documentaries	A strand of documentaries focusing on current events and issues affecting Asia.		
In Conversation	A one-on-one interview programme presented by Lin Xueling.	Past guests have included Malaysian prime ministers Mahathir Mohamad and Anwar Ibrahim, Coca-Cola Company president James Quincey, Twitter chief executive officer Jack Dorsey, Malaysian author Tash Aw, former U.S. president Barack Obama, Myanmar State Counsellor Aung San Suu Kyi, Egyptian president Abdel Fattah el-Sisi, Indonesian president Joko Widodo, and Uniqlo founder Tadashi Yanai.	
Insight	A one-hour current affairs programme that focuses on political, social, and economic issues.		
Japan Hour	A 60-minute programming block featuring Japanese travel, food, and culture.	The programme is sourced from NHK World TV and TV Tokyo in Japan and is subtitled in English. Due to copyright restrictions, it is not available for live streaming outside Singapore.	
Money Mind	A show examining economic developments, financial markets, companies, products, and trends.		
Singapore Hour	A weekly programme featuring lifestyle, culture, food, travel and local trends around Singapore.		
Why It Matters	A show exploring emerging technologies and social trends.		
Undercover Asia	An investigative documentary series examining social issues across Asia.		
When Titans Clash	A programme examining regional geopolitics, including economic and political shifts involving China, the West, and Japan.		

=== Current affairs programmes from Channel 5 ===
In addition to its original programming, CNA rebroadcasts selected current affairs programmes from its domestic sister channel Channel 5 for international audiences, including Talking Point and On the Red Dot.

Title	Description	Notes	Refs
Talking Point	Channel 5's longest-running current affairs programme and investigates contemporary issues from multiple perspectives.	Its current presenter is Steven Chia.	
On the Red Dot	A weekly current affairs programme that documents the experiences of Singaporeans and explores themes of identity, resilience, and community.		

== News bulletins ==
Title	Description	Main presenters	Relief presenters	Other presenters	Notes	Refs
Asia First	A breakfast news and current affairs programme.	Julie Yoo, Elizabeth Neo (alternate main presenter)	Sarah Al-Khaldi (relief; one-off main presenter), Arnold Gay (one-off business presenter), Yasmin Jonkers (relief), Henry Yin (relief)	Teresa Tang (occasional),	It has a three-hour runtime, the longest among CNA's news bulletins, and airs from 7:00 a.m. Singapore Time (SGT). The programme was formed through the consolidation of two earlier morning programmes, First Look Asia and Asia Business First. A half-hour weekend summary was previously broadcast but was later replaced by morning editions of Asia Now. The programme does not air on certain Asian public holidays or during the year-end period from 25 December to the week of 1 January, prior to the first regular working day of the year in major Asian countries. Asia First and its predecessor First Look Asia were simulcast on Channel 5 as breakfast programmes in Singapore. The simulcast ended after 30 April 2019 to accommodate children's programming formerly broadcast on Okto, which ceased operations the following day. As of April 2024, Asia First is the only CNA news bulletin to feature more than one main presenter, following changes to the presentation formats of Asia Tonight, Singapore Tonight, and the former World Tonight. ||	
Asia Now	A rolling news bulletin that monitors developments across Asia.	Yasmin Jonkers, Elakeyaa Selvaraji, Rani Samtani, Grace Shin, Keith Liu, Poh Kok Ing, Olivia Marzuki, Sarah Al-Khaldi, Henry Yin, Clara Lee, Glenda Chong, Paul Sng, Genevieve Woo	Julie Yoo (weekend relief), Arnold Gay (weekend relief)	Loke Wei Sue (selected weekdays), Syahida Othman (selected weekdays), Angela Lim (selected weekends), Teresa Tang (occasional), Jill Neubronner (occasional), Otelli Edwards (one-off relief), Elizabeth Neo (one-off relief), Roland Lim (one-off main presenter)	It airs at various times throughout the day, with runtimes and timeslots differing between weekdays, weekends, and Singapore public holidays.	
Asia Tonight	CNA's flagship regional news bulletin, providing a daily round-up of major stories from across Asia, with selected international news presented from an Asian perspective.	Loke Wei Sue (weekdays), Paul Sng (weekends)	Genevieve Woo (weekday relief; occasional weekend relief), Keith Liu (weekend relief), Syahida Othman, Angela Lim, Glenda Chong, Roland Lim (one-off relief), Otelli Edwards (one-off relief)	Jill Neubronner (occasional)	Formerly titled Primetime Asia, the programme airs nightly at 8:00 p.m. SGT. On weeknights, the bulletin runs for one hour. Half-hour editions air on weekends, selected Asian public holidays, and during the year-end period from 25 December to the week of 1 January, prior to the first regular working day of the year in major Asian countries.	
East Asia Tonight	A regional bulletin covering daily developments in China, Taiwan, Hong Kong, Japan, North Korea, and South Korea. The programme includes breaking news, international news briefs, and analysis from CNA correspondents based across East Asia.	Otelli Edwards, Olivia Siong, Roland Lim	Loke Wei Sue, Syahida Othman, Angela Lim, Grace Shin, Olivia Marzuki, Henry Yin	Jill Neubronner (occasional)	The bulletin airs for one hour on weeknights at 6:00 p.m. SGT, with next-day rebroadcasts from Tuesday to Saturday at 12:03 a.m. SGT. Originally broadcast from 1999 to 2011, the programme was later merged with Southeast Asia Tonight to form Primetime Asia, the predecessor of the current Asia Tonight. Following its revival in 2024, full episodes are regularly uploaded to CNA's YouTube channel after broadcast. The programme does not air on selected Asian public holidays or during the year-end period from 25 December to the week of 1 January.	
Headline News / Christmas Headlines	A two-minute news update summarising major regional and international stories.				These bulletins are broadcast between CNA's news and current affairs programmes.	
Singapore Tonight	CNA's local news bulletin, providing coverage and analysis of developments within Singapore.	Syahida Othman (weekdays); Paul Sng (weekends), Angela Lim (interim main weekday presenter)	Loke Wei Sue (weekdays relief), Genevieve Woo (weekday relief; occasional weekend relief), Keith Liu (weekend relief; occasional weekday relief), Glenda Chong, Roland Lim (one-off relief)	Jill Neubronner (occasional)	It airs nightly at 10:00 p.m. SGT. Weeknight editions run for one hour, while weekend, public holiday, and year-end editions air for 30 minutes, including the period from Christmas Day to the week of New Year's Day.	
