= International Channel =

The name International Channel may represent:

- International Channel Shanghai: Cable television channel based in Shanghai, China. Also known as ICS.
- CFHD-DT, branded as International Channel/Canal International or ICI, an ethnic / multicultural television channel located in Montreal, Quebec, Canada
- AZN Television: Defunct American television channel previously called "International Channel"
- XFM 96.3: Radio station in Singapore previously known as "International Channel 96.3FM"
