= The Muttons =

Singaporean radio presenter duo

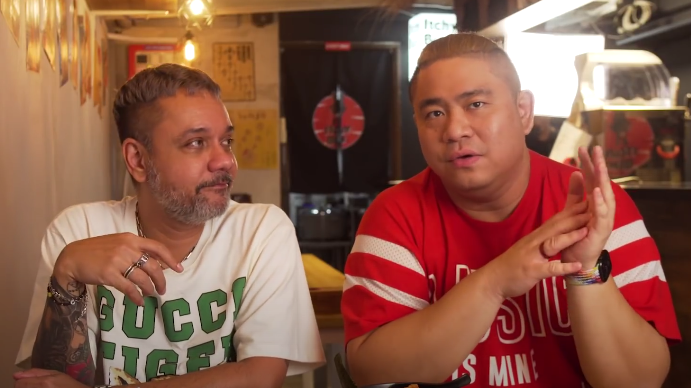
- Justin Ang (right) and Vernon Anthonisz (left) in 2022
- Occupations: Radio presenters Restauranters
- Years active: 2005–present
- Employer(s): 987FM; 2005–2015; Class 95; 2015–present
- Notable work: Muttons in the Morning
- Awards: Best Radio Show (2010, 2011, and 2013)

The Muttons are a Singaporean radio presenter and restauranter duo consisting of Singaporeans Justin Ang (Chinese: 洪伟扬) and Vernon Keith Anthonisz (also known as Vernon A.). The pair first began their career in June 2005 on Mediacorp-owned radio station 987FM before moving to Class 95 in 2015, hosting the Muttons in the Morning show. The pair have won the Best Radio Show Award at the Singapore Radio Awards in 2010, 2011, and 2013. The pair also own multiple restaurants.

== Radio career ==
The Muttons began their radio career in June 2005, hosting the Muttons on the Move show on radio station 987FM. In May 2007, the Muttons were suspended for their participation in "No Bra Day", where they challenged young models into competing to see who could remove their bras in the fastest time possible. They returned in July, hosting the night show Muttons To Midnight.

In 2010, the pair won the Best Radio Award at the Singapore Radio Awards 2010 and released an album, The Mutton Show: What the Bleah!. In 2011, they won the Best Radio Award again. In 2013, they won the Best Radio Award again. Ang additionally received the Most Popular Radio Personality award. In 2015, the Muttons moved to Class 95, hosting the morning show Muttons in the Morning. In 2020, the Muttons launched a podcast, The Mutton Sandwich Podcast.

== Other ventures ==
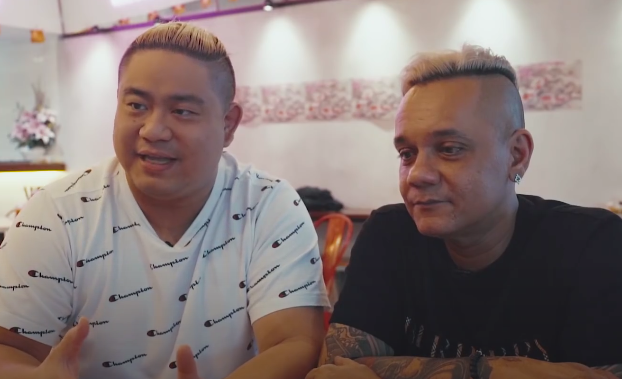
The Muttons in 2019 at their restaurant Fook Kin

In 2018, the Muttons launched their first restaurant, Fook Kin, after partnering with Fat Boys to acquire the restaurant. Fook Kin sells Cantonese-style char siu. In 2019, their Fook Kin restaurant at Old Airport Road caught on fire. Nobody was injured as all 40 diners were evacuated safely.

In 2022, they launched their second restaurant, Itchy Bun. Itchy Bun sells Japanese-style food. In 2023, the Muttons took over Thai-style restaurant Korat Thai Cafe at Orchard Towers.

== Personal lives ==
=== Justin Ang ===
Ang is an only child who lived with his parents till 2024, where he moved out and bought a S$2.5 million penthouse. He is married to Ilona Loo, a director at a market research firm. Ang was nominated at the Top 10 awards at the 2014 Star Awards.

=== Vernon Anthonisz ===
Anthonisz is of English, Dutch, and Portuguese descent and briefly lived in Indonesia. In 2022, he bought a S$1.45 million condominium for his wife Jayne Tham, an influencer and marketing manager, and their 3 sons.
