= In Conversation (Singaporean TV program) =

Singapore television programme

In Conversation, previously known as Conversation With (CW) from 1999 to 2018, is a Singapore television programme broadcast on Asian news network CNA. The show has been on the air for 22 years and was twice nominated for Best Talk Show at the Asian Television Awards. Notable guests on the interview show includec President of the United States Barack Obama and Nobel Peace Prize recipient Aung San Suu Kyi.

== History ==
CW, originally titled In Conversation, debuted on 28 April 1996. The show initially aired on Singapore domestic television, on Singapore's English-language station Mediacorp Channel 5 and was produced by the then Television Corporation of Singapore, which was renamed Mediacorp TV in February 2001.

CW began airing on CNA when the network was launched on 1 March 1999, and would later find an international audience when CNA began broadcasting regionally in September 2000. The show is today available in 28 territories, according to CNA, where the network is currently available. The program was reverted to its former name on 26 April 2019.

== Format ==
Since its debut, CW has been a personality profile conducted through one-on-one interviews in episodes of 25 minutes duration. The show has a broad focus with celebrities such as Jackie Chan having been featured, although subjects are mostly political and business figures.

The first subject on CW was Singapore's Economic Development Board CEO Philip Yeo, with former US Secretary of State James Baker featuring in the second episode.

In 2016, CW secured an exclusive interview with the President of the United States Barack Obama on the sidelines of the US-ASEAN summit in Sunnylands, California.

== Notable guests ==
- President of the United States Barack Obama
- Aung San Suu Kyi, 1991 Nobel Peace Prize recipient and first State Counsellor of Myanmar
- Former International Monetary Fund Managing Director Christine Lagarde
- Uniqlo president and founder Tadashi Yanai
- Tata Group chairman Ratan Tata
- Airbnb co-founder and Chief Technology Officer Nathan Blecharczyk
- Actor Jackie Chan
- Actress Michelle Yeoh
- Oscar-winning actor Robert De Niro
