= Lush 99.5FM =

Defunct Singaporean radio station

- Singapore
- Frequency: 99.5 MHz

Programming
- Language: English
- Format: Eclectic

Ownership
- Owner: Mediacorp Pte Ltd; (Mediacorp Radio)

History
- First air date: 31 December 2004; 21 years ago
- Last air date: 31 August 2017; 9 years ago

Technical information
- Transmitter coordinates: 1.2957°N 103.7923°E

Links
- Webcast: Web Stream; Song List

Lush 99.5FM was an English-language radio station of the state-owned media conglomerate Mediacorp in Singapore. It broadcast an eclectic format with a particular focus on local and indie music, alternative rock, urban adult contemporary, and electronic music.

== History ==
The station launched 31 December 2004 at 7:25 am; MediaCorp stated that Lush would focus on "trendsetting" and "new-age contemporary" music, including chill-out and nu jazz. At its launch, the station broadcast from 7:00 a.m. to 2:00 a.m. daily. On 20 January 2005, the station expanded to 24-hour broadcasting.

On 20 August 2009, the station relocated from Caldecott Hill to studios at Orchard Central. On 7 July 2012, the station moved back to Caldecott Hill.

Every week, various guest DJs would be invited on The Lush Mix, which aired on Saturdays from 8pm with repeats on weekdays from 9pm.

After having been Mediacorp's lowest-rated radio station for several years, Lush was shut down on 1 September 2017. Mediacorp stated that it wanted to concentrate its efforts on its other English-language stations, and that Lush's remit of showcasing local music would be supplanted by the company-wide "Singapore Sounds" initiative.

== See also ==
- List of radio stations in Singapore
