= Shan Wee =

Northern Irish radio presenter

- Born: 17 January 1982 (age 44); Belfast, Northern Ireland
- Education: Durham University
- Occupations: Radio DJ; TV presenter; Author
- Spouse: Mona Wee (m.2022)
- Children: 3
- Website: shanwee.com

Shan Wee (born 17 January 1982) is a radio presenter and media personality from Northern Ireland who presents the lunchtime show on One FM 91.3 in Singapore. He was previously a presenter on Singapore radio stations 987FM and Kiss92FM.

== Biography ==
Wee was born in Belfast and grew up in Bushmills. He is half Irish and half Chinese. After completing a degree at Durham University in England, he moved to Singapore and first entered the radio industry as a presenter on 987FM. He married Indonesian businesswoman Artika Sulaiman in 2011 and left Singapore in 2012 to run an events company in Bali. However the couple returned to Singapore in 2013 and Shan joined Hot FM 91.3 (which was renamed One FM 91.3 in 2015), where he co-presented shows with Cheryl Miles. In 2017, Wee moved to Kiss 92FM. He is also Music Director for the station.

In addition to working in radio, Wee has also made various television appearances. In 2005, he was a contestant on the Channel 5 reality TV dating show An Eye for a Guy II, in which contestants vied for the affections of MTV Asia veejay Denise Keller. He has also been a presenter on various TV shows, including SinghaFootball Crazy on Fox Sports Asia and the entertainment news programme Rated E.

Wee and his wife divorced in 2018 and share custody of their two sons, Ciaran and Ruan. In 2017 Wee published a book on parenting entitled 99 Rules For New Dads. He also began writing regular articles on parenting for The Straits Times in 2017. In 2022, he married marketing executive Mona Gill, and is stepfather to their daughter Arya.
