= Asmah Laili =

Singaporean radio and television presenter and producer (1940–2019)

- fair use image
- Born: 24 September 1940
- Died: 15 February 2019 (aged 78); Singapore
- Occupations: Chef, television presenter, radio presenter and producer

Asmah Laili (24 September 1940 – 15 February 2019) was a Singaporean radio and television presenter and producer, who also became famous for her programs and publications on Malay cuisine.

== Career ==
Asmah Laili began working at Singapore Broadcasting Corporation in 1959, as a protégée of Zahrah Za'ba, the company's first female executive. Asmah anchored programs on Warna 94.2FM, and was an executive producer for the Malay radio station in Singapore, working with writer Jah Lelawati among others. She was the first woman to work as a television presenter in Singapore, and was a mentor to aspiring female broadcasters who followed. She retired from broadcasting in 1997. In 2003, she was the subject of an episode of Ikon wanita, a documentary series on Muslim women in Singapore.

As a celebrity chef, she was known affectionately as "Mami Asmah", and demonstrated Malay cookery on radio and television shows in Singapore, as host of Sedap and Dapur Mami. She also wrote cookbooks. In 2009 she released a cooking DVD, Tanya Mami (Ask Mami).

== Personal life and death ==
Asmah Laili married in 1967, and had two children; she lived in Bedok. She died at Changi General Hospital in 2019, aged 78 years, from lung disease. Her body was interred at Choa Chu Kang Muslim Cemetery after her death.
