= Glenda Chong =

Singaporean news correspondent

- Born: 7 April 1973 (age 53); Singapore
- Occupations: Journalist; presenter
- Spouse: Justin Chan
- Children: 1

Glenda Chong is a Singaporean news journalist and presenter. She is the currently host of news segment, News Tonight, of CNA by Mediacorp.

== Early and personal life ==
Chong was born and raised in Singapore, to her Hakka father and Peranakan mother. She attended CHIJ Katong Convent, Victoria Junior College and Royal Melbourne Institute of Technology, and graduated summa cum laude from Boston University with a Bachelor of Science in Broadcast Journalism and holds a Masters of Social Sciences (International Studies) from the National University of Singapore.

She is married to Justin Chan, who is a lawyer. In October 2024, at age 51, Glenda was four months pregnant with her first child, a son, who was born on 5 March 2025.

== Career ==
Chong previously served as Channel NewsAsia's China Correspondent for three years in Shanghai. Highlights of her work include reporting on the 2008 Beijing Olympics, covering the devastating aftermath of the 2008 Sichuan earthquake, and the 2010 Shanghai World Expo.

At Asian Television Awards in 2001, she was named Best News Anchor, along with her co-presenter Melvin Yong. She was also awarded Best Presenter at MediaCorp’s Annual Excellence Awards in 2005.

Major breaking news stories that she has helmed include 2004 Indian Ocean earthquake and tsunami and 2006 Thai Coup. She also anchored 'live' election programmes such as Taiwan’s 2004 presidential election and Channel NewsAsia's 'live' election night specials for Malaysia's 2004 and 2008 General Elections.
