= Kenneth Chung =

Singaporean radio DJ (born 1985)

- Born: 11 July 1985 (age 41); Singapore
- Education: National Chengchi University
- Occupations: Radio presenter; actor
- Years active: 2011–present
- Employer: YES 933

Birth name
- Traditional Chinese: 鐘坤華
- Simplified Chinese: 钟坤华
- Hanyu Pinyin: Zhōng Kūnhuá

Stage name (Kunhua)
- Traditional Chinese: 坤華
- Simplified Chinese: 坤华
- Hanyu Pinyin: Kūnhuá

Kenneth Chung Kun Wah (born 11 July 1985), better known by his stage name Kunhua, is a Singaporean radio personality at Singapore-based Chinese music station YES 933. He is also an occasional actor.

== Life and career ==
Chung had previously worked as a part-time deejay for YES 933 as early as 2005. He later attended the National Chengchi University in Taipei, Taiwan, where he studied arts and radio.

Graduating in 2010, he joined YES 933 as a professional disk jockey that year. He is the host of his own radio show, Moo...ve It On, which is targeted at school-going children.

Over the years, he hosted YES 933's many drive time shows including The DAKA Show , Good Evening! and The Shuang and Kunz Show. Currently, he hosts the 4-8pm evening show The Shuang, Kunz and Jia Trio and the station's pop chart show Pick of the Pops.

== Filmography ==
=== Film and theatre ===
- 2011: Resonance (回音)
- 2014: Like Me.I Like (守机碍情)

=== Television series ===
Year	Title	Role	Notes	Ref.
2016	Peace & Prosperity	Xiong Wei		
2016	Hero	Host		
2017	Mightiest Mother-in-Law	Himself		
2017	The Lead	Director Zhong		
2017	Eat Already? 3	Television technician		
2017	While We Are Young	Kun Hua		
2018	Die Die Also Must Serve	Jeremy Chan		
2018	A Million Dollar Dream	Jeft		
2018	29 February	Zheng Yuanhua		
2018	Jalan Jalan			
2023	All That Glitters	Fengshui master		

== Discography ==
=== Compilation albums ===
Year	English title	Mandarin title
2015	MediaCorp Music Lunar New Year Album 15	新传媒群星金羊添吉祥
2019	MediaCorp Music Lunar New Year Album 19	新传媒群星猪饱饱欢乐迎肥年
2023	MediaCorp Music Lunar New Year Album 23	新传媒2023贺岁传辑哈皮兔宝福星照

== Awards and nominations ==
Organisation	Year	Category	Nominated work	Result	Ref
Golden Mic Awards	2016	YES 933 FM Most Popular DJ		Nominated	
Golden Mic Awards	2016	Most Popular Group	Great Coffee Together 大咖一起来	Nominated	
Golden Mic Awards	2016	DJ I'd Like to Travel With		Nominated	
Star Awards	2022	Best Combo	SPOP WAVE!SPOP 艺起唱	Nominated (Note: Shared with Chen Ning)	
Star Awards	2023	Top 10 Most Popular Male Artistes	—N/a	Nominated	
Star Awards	2024	Top 10 Most Popular Male Artistes	—N/a	Nominated	
Star Awards	2024	Best Audio Personality	KUNZversations 一点都不KUNZ	Nominated	
Star Awards	2025	Best Audio Personality	YES 933 - The Shuang, Kunz and Jia Trio 双节坤佳	Won	
Star Awards	2026	Best Audio Personality	YES 933 - The Shuang, Kunz and Jia Trio 双节坤佳	Nominated	
