= UFM100.3 =

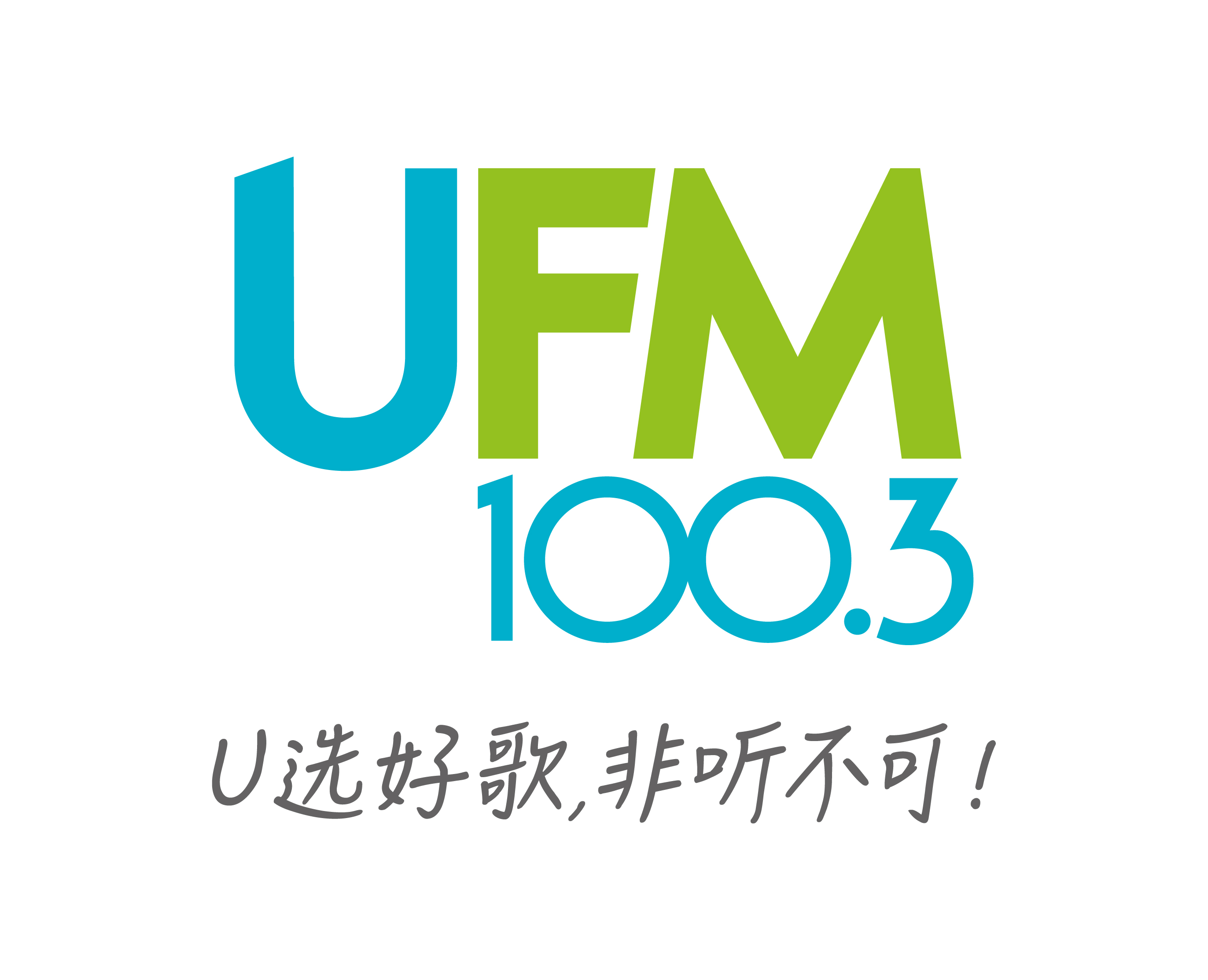
- Singapore
- Broadcast area: Singapore; Batam and Bintan Islands (Indonesia); Johor (Malaysia)
- Frequency: 100.3 MHz

Programming
- Format: Adult Contemporary (Mandopop); CHR (C-pop)

Ownership
- Owner: SPH Media
- Sister stations: Money FM 89.3; One FM 91.3; Kiss92 FM; 96.3 Hao FM

History
- First air date: 3 October 2001; 25 years ago

Links
- Website: https://www.ufm1003.sg/

UFM100.3 is a Chinese-language radio station of SPH Media based in Singapore, with emphasis on Mandarin songs from the 2000s onward as well as lifestyle programmes. The station is organised under the Chinese Media Group.

== History ==
The license to operate the station was granted in April 1990 by the National Trades Union Congress, which aimed at starting two FM radio stations on 91.3 and 100.3, the former in English and the latter in Mandarin.

On 31 January 1991, the station made an agreement with the BBC World Service to carry its Mandarin news service from later the following week, marking the first time the Mandarin broadcasts were relayed on a foreign station. In addition to news bulletins, selected newsmagazine programmes from the BBC were also included.

Lianhe Zaobao criticised the station on 16 March 1991 for its usage of "adulterated" Mandarin. Deejays were using English loanwords instead of their Chinese counterparts. Two days later, the newspaper thought that the excessive usage of English on the station was a "worrying sign".

As with its English counterpart, the station started 24-hour broadcasts on 1 May 1994. Its overnight programme Sleepless in Romance was similar in style to daytime programmes due to its extensive usage of caller participation which was unexpectedly high for such a timeslot.

In March 2001, the upstart SPH MediaWorks announced its plans to acquire Heart from the NTUC. by the end of May. The station was renamed UFM on 3 October 2001, as a tie-in to its TV sister Channel U. As part of this corporate synergy, UFM carried the Next Wave concerts in May 2002, which were shared with both Channel U and Channel i.

UFM was fined S$15,000 by the Singapore Broadcasting Authority in early June 2002 due to the airing of personal remarks from the news presenter, breaching the laws for news and current affairs programs which should be "objective, accurate and balanced".

== Accolades ==
The station received a Friend of the Arts Award in 2012.

== See also ==
- List of radio stations in Singapore
