= Oli968 =

Radio station in Singapore

Oli 968
- Singapore
- Broadcast area: Singapore; Johor Bahru/Johor Bahru District (Malaysia); Batam/Batam Islands, Riau Islands (Indonesia)
- Frequency: 96.8 MHz

Programming
- Languages: Tamil; Mandarin (until 31 December 1989)
- Format: Tamil music

Ownership
- Owner: Mediacorp

History
- First air date: 1 January 1951; 75 years ago (on AM); 15 July 1967; 59 years ago (on FM)
- Last air date: 31 December 1993; 32 years ago (on AM)
- Former names: Red Network (1 January 1951 – 3 January 1959); Radio Singapore (4 January 1959 – 31 December 1981); Tamil Service (4 January 1959 – 31 December 1981); Radio 4 (1 January 1982 – 31 October 1991); Olikkalanjiam 96.8FM (1 November 1991 – 11 February 2001)
- Former frequencies: 1370 kHz (1 January 1951 – 23 November 1978); 1368 kHz (23 November 1978 – 31 December 1993)

Links
- Webcast: MeListen; TuneIn
- Website: Oli 968

Oli 968 (Tamil: ஒலி 968) is a Tamil-language radio station in Singapore. Owned by the state-owned broadcaster Mediacorp, it broadcasts programming serving Indian Singaporeans, including music of Tamil Nadu.

The station's origins can be traced back to Radio Malaya Singapore's Red Network—which broadcast programming in Tamil. The station later became the Tamil Service of Radio Television Singapore, and began to be relayed on 95.8 FM on 15 July 1967. It became known as Radio 4 on 1 January 1982, and later Olikkalanjiam 96.8FM on 1 November 1991. The station was simulcast on AM and FM until 31 December 1993.

An audio simulcast of Oli 968 is carried by Mediacorp's Tamil television channel Vasantham after sign-off.

== History ==
Although programming in Tamil was carried by the extant Singaporean radio station in its several incarnations from 1 March 1937 to 22 December 1945, it wasn't until 23 December 1945 where a de facto separate service for Chinese and Indian dialects—the Red Network, was created by Radio Singapura. On 1 January 1951, Chinese programmes were spun off to a new station, the Green Network.

The AM frequency was later used in 1963 to provide a second audio channel for TV Singapura. The station began FM transmissions on 96.8 MHz on 15 July 1967. The AM signal moved from 1370 kHz to 1368 kHz on 23 November 1978 to comply with the Geneva Frequency Plan of 1975.

On 1 January 1982, the station was rebranded as Radio 4 as part of a restructuring of the Singapore Broadcasting Corporation (SBC)'s stations; by then, most of its broadcast day was occupied by Tamil-language content, although it still carried a small block of Chinese programmes from 9 p.m. to midnight. As part of the rebrand, Radio 4 would also introduce a new evening "chat show" featuring music, topical segments, and listener phone-ins; Radio 4's programme manager M K Narayanan stated that it was "the first time such shows are being broadcast in this region. As far as I know, there are no such shows in India and Sri Lanka." In 1990, after SBC realigned its radio stations, the station started broadcasting in Tamil only and closed down at midnight.

On 1 November 1991, it was announced that Radio 4 was to be renamed Olikkalanjiam (Tamil: ஒலிக்களஞ்சியம், romanized: Olikkaḷañciyam, later shortened to simply Oli), meaning "treasure house of sound". The station started carrying a half-hour self-help show from SINDA on Sundays at 11am. The AM signals of all SBC stations were discontinued on 1 January 1994. The name was later shortened to just Oli (transl. sound).
