= Symphony924 =

Radio station in Singapore

Symphony 924
- Singapore
- Broadcast area: Singapore; Johor Bahru/Johor Bahru District (Malaysia); Batam/Batam Islands, Riau Islands (Indonesia)
- Frequency: 92.4 MHz

Programming
- Language: English
- Format: Classical music

Ownership
- Owner: Mediacorp

History
- First air date: 18 July 1969; 57 years ago (Note: The AM service ceased on 31 December 1993.)
- Former names: FM Stereo Service (1969–1982); Radio 5 (1982–1991)
- Former frequencies: 790 kHz (1969–1978); 792 kHz (1978–1993)

Links
- Webcast: TuneIn; MeListen
- Website: Symphony 924

Symphony 924 is an English-language radio station in Singapore. Owned by state-owned broadcaster Mediacorp, it broadcasts classical music.

The station launched on 18 July 1969 as Radio Television Singapore's "FM Stereo Service"; its format initially featured classical and easy listening music. Since 1990, the station has primarily broadcast classical music.

== History ==
Radio Television Singapore launched its fifth station — an "FM Stereo Service" — on 18 July 1969 at 92.4 MHz FM and 790 kHz AM (792 kHz AM years later). It broadcast for a total of eight hours per-day, divided between two blocks from 6:00 a.m. to 9:00 a.m., and 6:00 p.m. to 11:00 p.m.

On 1 August 1980, the FM Stereo service began broadcasting for 18 hours a day, increasing from just eight hours. "Light and pop music" aired for 12 hours instead of three, consisting of "middle-of-the-road, country and western, easy pops and light jazz" and no hard rock. The advertising rates were lower than that of SBC's AM stations. On 1 January 1982, the station rebranded as Radio 5.

In 1990, with the remit of middle-of-the-road music moving to the newly-launched Class 95, 92.4 began devoting itself entirely to classical music. In addition, after having previously broadcast programmes presented in both English and Mandarin, the station shifted to an entirely English-language presentation.

The AM simulcasts of all SBC radio stations ended on 1 January 1994. In January 1995, 92.4 briefly attempted at extending its transmission time to 2 am. The station later returned to the usual 6 a.m. to 12 a.m. broadcasting time in March 1995.

92.4 began collaborating with the Singapore Symphony Orchestra in January 1995, airing selected performances from the orchestra.

In August 1995, to increase listenership and revenue, 92.4 removed most of its classical music and added "light pops"; however the move was disliked by listeners. 92.4 later decided to air classical music in two slots – 6 to 9 a.m. and 8 p.m. to 12 a.m. (becoming 2 to 4 p.m. on weekdays and 9 a.m. to 8 p.m. on weekends in October, with the 12 to 2 p.m. portion added in November), with the rest of the broadcast day filled with "quality music" including Broadway music, light orchestral, solo instrumental and jazz. 92.4 was also reported to have one of the highest listenerships for a classical music station at 3.7%.

From 1980 to 2004, notable journalist and writer Duncan Watt worked at this station.

The station moved to 24-hour broadcasts on 1 January 2008.

== See also ==
- List of radio stations in Singapore
