= Warna942 =

Radio station in Singapore

Warna 942
- Singapore
- Broadcast area: Singapore; Johor Bahru/Johor Bahru District (Malaysia); Batam/Batam Islands, Riau Islands (Indonesia)
- Frequency: 94.2 MHz

Programming
- Language: Malay
- Format: Adult contemporary Religious radio

Ownership
- Owner: Mediacorp
- Sister stations: Ria 897

History
- First air date: 4 January 1959; 67 years ago (on AM); 15 July 1967; 59 years ago (on FM)
- Last air date: 31 December 1993; 32 years ago (on AM)
- Former names: Radio Singapore (Radio Singapura) (4 January 1959–31 December 1981); Malay Service (Perkhidmatan Bahasa Melayu) (4 January 1959–31 December 1981); Radio 2 (Radio Dua) (1 January 1982–22 November 1991)
- Former frequencies: 990 kHz (4 January 1959–31 December 1993)

Technical information
- Licensing authority: IMDA

Links
- Webcast: MeListen; TuneIn
- Website: Warna 942

Warna 942 is a Malay language radio station in Singapore. Owned by the state-owned broadcaster Mediacorp, it broadcasts a full-service format serving Malay Singaporeans, including music, news, and religious programming.

The station's origins can be traced back to Radio Singapura's Malay Service, which began on 4 January 1959. The station began a relay on 94.2 FM on 15 July 1967. It was later rebranded as Radio 2 on 1 January 1982, and then Warna (colour) on 23 November 1991.

In a 2016 survey, Nielsen rated Warna 942 as the country's most listened-to Malay station. In an updated 2020 Nielsen survey, Warna 942 maintained its top spot for Malay stations.

== History ==
Radio broadcasting in Singapore in the Malay language can be traced back to 1 June 1936, when the British colonial government started to allow regulated Malay radio services. This programming would evolve over decades, eventually becoming Radio Singapura. Radio Singapura began service on 4 January 1959, succeeding Radio Malaya Singapore; after having shared airtime with English-language programmes on the Blue Network, a dedicated Malay channel was established under the new broadcaster. On 15 July 1967, Radio Television Singapore officially launched its FM radio service, with the Malay service simulcasting on 94.2 FM. On 1 January 1982, as part of a larger rebranding of the Singapore Broadcasting Corporation (SBC) radio stations, the station was rebranded as "Radio 2". On 1 January 1994, SBC ended AM transmission of its stations, moving exclusively to FM.

Before 2008, its audio feed was simulcast in the television channel Suria after sign-off. In 2008, this was replaced by audio feed of Ria 897.

In August 2013, Warna 942 along with Ria 897 and Suria were consolidated into Mediacorp's Malay Broadcast Division.

== Programming ==
The station carries a mix of adult contemporary Malay music, as well as news from Mediacorp's Berita newsroom, and radio dramas.

The station broadcasts religious programming catering to the Islamic community. It broadcasts the Islamic call to prayer (azan solat) at the five times determined by the Majlis Ugama Islam Singapura (MUIS). A block of daily religious talk programming is aired at 5:00 a.m. SGT, prior to the call for Subuh. On Friday evenings, the station broadcasts a short programme (solat juma'at) recapping the khutbah of the Imam from earlier midday. Yearly on Eid al-Fitr and Eid al-Adha, the station broadcasts the live Malay-language khutbah immediately after the Takbir from a mosque at 8:00 a.m. During the Maulidur Rasul holiday, the station incorporates Nasyid music dedicated to Muhammad into its music programming.

== See also ==
- List of radio stations in Singapore
- Asmah Laili
