= Capital958 =

Capital 958
- Singapore
- Frequency: 95.8 MHz

Programming
- Language: Mandarin
- Format: Classic hits (C-pop)

Ownership
- Owner: Mediacorp
- Sister stations: YES 933, Love 972

History
- First air date: 1 March 1937; 89 years ago as Radio Singapore (on AM frequency); 15 July 1967; 59 years ago (on FM frequency)
- Former frequencies: 680 kHz (1937–1978); 675 kHz (1978–1994)

Technical information
- Transmitter coordinates: 1.2958°N 103.792°E

Links
- Webcast: melisten; TuneIn
- Website: CAPITAL 958

Capital 958 (Chinese: 958城市頻道; lit. '958 City Channel') is a Mandarin-language radio station in Singapore. Owned by the state-owned broadcaster Mediacorp, it broadcasts a classic hits format.

The station's origins can be traced back to Radio Malaya Singapore's Green Network—which broadcast programming in Chinese varieties. The station later became the Chinese Service of Radio Television Singapore, and began to be relayed on 95.8 FM in 1967. It became known as Radio 3 in 1982, and later 95.8 City Sounds in 1992. The station was simulcast on AM and FM until 1994.

In a 2022 survey, Nielsen ranked Capital 958 as Singapore's fourth-highest rated radio station.

== History ==
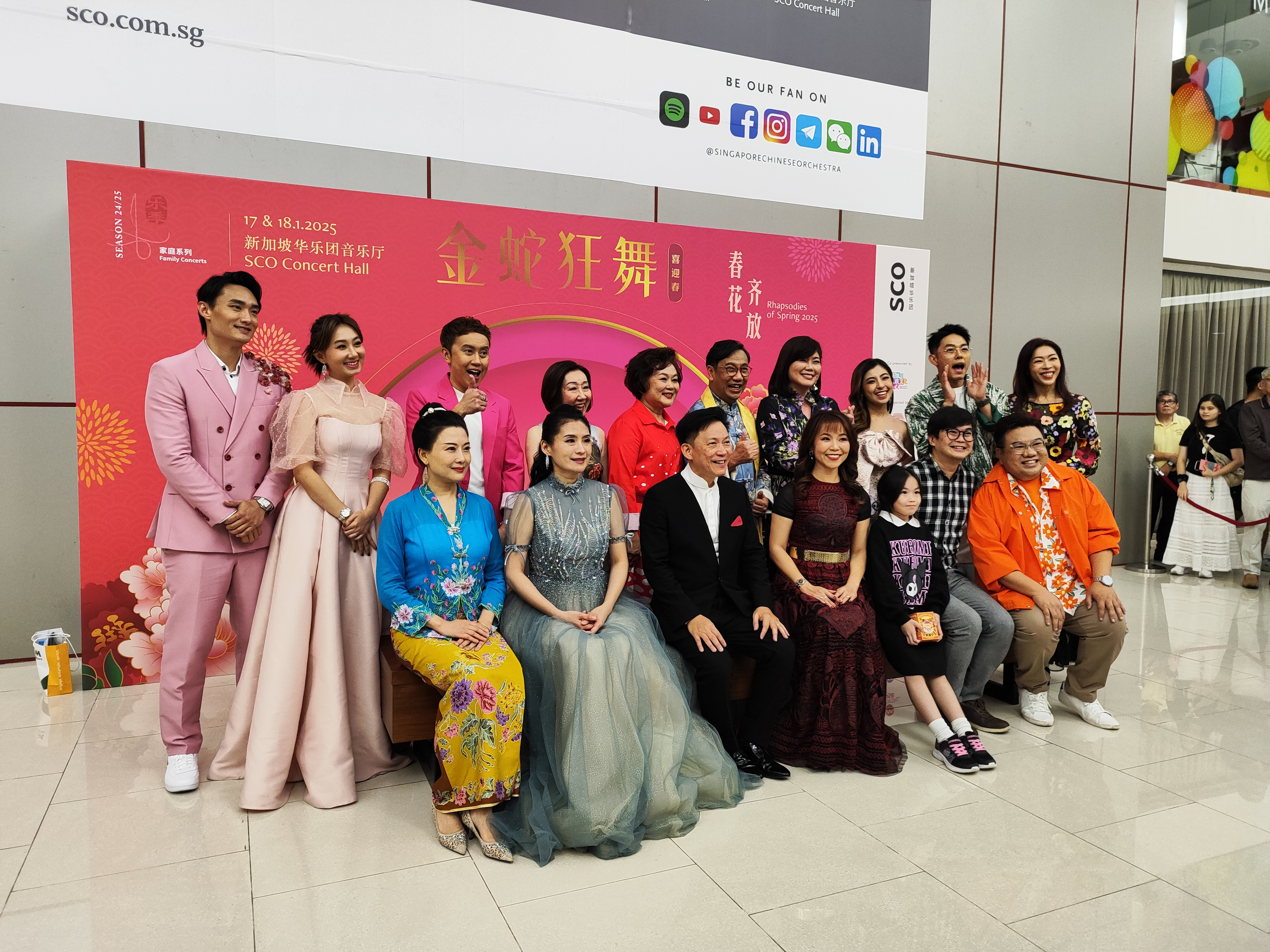
DJs of Capital 958 at Singapore Chinese Orchestra's concert Rhapsody in Spring 2025

Although programming in Chinese varieties was carried by the extant Singaporean radio station in its several incarnations from 1937 to 1945, it wasn't until 23 December 1945 where a de facto separate service in Chinese and Indian languages, the Red Network, was created. Strictly speaking, an all-Chinese service was announced in December 1950, with the launch date set for 1 January 1951. The new network was known as the Green Network. One of the aims of the new service was to counter Communist propaganda in the region (alongside the Malay service). The station broadcast on 72 metres (7200 kilocycles, later redefined to 680 kHz on AM medium wave) from 5 p.m. to 11 p.m. nightly, and was moved to 675 kHz in 1978 to conform with the Geneva Frequency Plan of 1975.

The station began FM transmissions on 95.8 MHz in 1967, and was renamed Radio 3 in 1982. With the launch of the contemporary mandopop station YES 933 in 1990, Radio 3 pivoted its programming to include more infotainment programmes during the daytime and early-evening hours. A new block of arts and cultural programming would now air from 8 to 10 p.m., including a programme of news bulletins in Hokkien, Cantonese, Teochew, Hainanese, Hakka and Fuzhounese at 8 p.m. (each of which lasting three to five minutes), and Chinese operas.

The station rebranded as 95.8 City Channel (城市频道, initially promoted in English-language marketing as "95.8 City Sounds" and later "Capital Radio") on 16 December 1991, with no change in format. SBC stated that the new name was intended to evoke the essence of "city life". The AM signals of all SBC stations were discontinued on 1 January 1994.

In preparation for 24-hour broadcasts in December 1994, City Sounds recruited six new deejays: three of them from mainland China. The new deejays were under 30. The station also trained the China-born deejays to speak clearly to make them understandable to local listeners. RCS also had problems replacing its current batch of non-Mandarin Chinese newsreaders, with most of its newsreaders in their late 50s and 60s. Although the news scripts were the same as Mandarin, the script readers would need to improvise due to the differences in the structures of each variety. The non-Mandarin Chinese news broadcasts also suffered from a lack of funding and professional newsreaders, with listeners preferring non-Mandarin Chinese songs than non-Mandarin Chinese news.

On 8 February 2017, the station moved from its long-time home of Caldecott Hill to the new Mediacorp campus at One-north.

== See also ==
- List of radio stations in Singapore
