= Love972 =

LOVE 972
- Singapore
- Broadcast area: Singapore; Johor Bahru/Johor Bahru District (Malaysia); Batam/Batam Islands, Riau Islands (Indonesia)
- Frequency: 97.2 MHz

Programming
- Language: Mandarin
- Format: Adult contemporary (Mandopop); Infotainment

Ownership
- Owner: Mediacorp
- Sister stations: YES 933; CAPITAL 958

History
- First air date: 23 September 1994; 32 years ago

Technical information
- Transmitter coordinates: 1.2957°N 103.7923°E

Links
- Webcast: melisten; TuneIn
- Website: LOVE 972

Love 972 (Chinese: 最愛頻道) is a Mandarin Chinese radio station in Singapore. Owned by the state-owned broadcaster Mediacorp, it primarily broadcasts an adult contemporary format focusing on Chinese pop music.

== History ==
The station was originally set to launch in October 1994. It was described as a Chinese equivalent to the English-language Class 95, and planned to target the increasing number of bilingual listeners, specifically workers between age 30 and 40 from the middle to higher income bracket. Test transmissions began in June 1994.

The station launched on 23 September 1994. Its Chinese name translates as "Best Loved Station". The station initially had five deejays coming from SBC and Rediffusion.

== See also ==
- List of radio stations in Singapore
