= Ria897 =

Malay radio station in Singapore

RIA 897
- Singapore
- Frequency: 89.7 MHz

Programming
- Language: Malay
- Format: Top 40 (CHR)

Ownership
- Owner: Mediacorp
- Sister stations: Warna 942

History
- First air date: 1 December 1990; 35 years ago

Technical information
- Transmitter coordinates: 1.2957°N 103.7923°E

Links
- Webcast: TuneIn; MeListen
- Website: Ria 89.7

Ria 897 is a Malay-language radio station in Singapore. Owned by the state-owned broadcaster Mediacorp and launched in 1990, it broadcasts a contemporary hit radio format focused on Malaysian popular music and Indonesian pop music.

Since 2008, an audio simulcast of Ria 897 is carried by Mediacorp's Malay television channel Suria after sign-off.

== History ==
SBC announced the start of a new Malay-language radio station on 89.7 FM in October 1990. The service was yet unnamed and would capture a younger audience than Radio 2, the existing Malay station. The initial budget for the station was $1 million.

The name Ria was announced in November, alongside its launch date of 1 December.

In August 2013, Ria 897 along with Warna 942 and Suria were consolidated into a new division set up by Mediacorp, which known as the Malay Broadcast Division.
