= CNA938 =

Coordinates: 1.312751°N 103.862°E

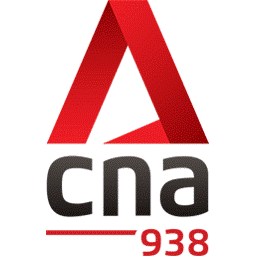
- Singapore
- Frequency: 93.8 MHz

Programming
- Language: English
- Format: News/Talk
- Affiliations: CNA

Ownership
- Owner: Mediacorp

History
- First air date: 2 October 1998; 28 years ago

Technical information
- Licensing authority: IMDA
- Power: 6,000 watts

Links
- Webcast: MeListen; TuneIn
- Website: CNA 938

CNA938 is an English-language radio station in Singapore. Owned by the state-owned broadcaster Mediacorp and launched on 2 October 1998, it broadcasts a news/talk radio format.

The station is marketed as a radio extension of Mediacorp's television channel CNA, broadcasting news and lifestyle programmes from 7 a.m. to 11 p.m. SGT daily. During the overnight hours, the station carries an audio simulcast of the CNA television channel.

== History ==
Plans for the launch of NewsRadio 938 was announced alongside two new radio stations by then-Minister for Information and the Arts George Yeo in March 1998. The station would be a spin-off of One FM, which used to air news-heavy content. The launch date was set for 2 October 1998, with sampler programming beginning in mid-June. It would broadcast eighteen hours a day with news every 15 minutes, talk and some light instrumental music. Early on, NewsRadio 938 became one of George Yeo's pre-set radio stations, preferring it more than the BBC World Service, showing that there was potential for radio news. In September, it launched Midday Business.

NewsRadio 938 rebranded as 938LIVE in 2005. 24-hour broadcasts started on 1 January 2008. A number of a new programmes and a stronger focus on news were introduced later in 2015.

On 6 November 2017, the station was relaunched as 938NOW, with a number of a new programmes and a stronger focus on news and lifestyle.

In March 2019, in conjunction with the 20th anniversary of Mediacorp's television news channel Channel NewsAsia (CNA), it was announced that 93.8 would be rebranded as an extension of CNA to promote the network as a multi-platform brand. The station rebranded as CNA938 on 3 June 2019.

== See also ==
- List of radio stations in Singapore
