= Gold905 =

Radio station in Singapore

GOLD 905
- Singapore
- Broadcast area: Singapore, Johor Bahru Malaysia & Batam Indonesia
- Frequency: 90.5 MHz

Programming
- Language: English
- Format: Classic hits

Ownership
- Owner: Mediacorp

History
- First air date: 1 March 1937; 89 years ago (on AM); 15 July 1967; 59 years ago (on FM)
- Last air date: 31 December 1993; 32 years ago (on AM)
- Former names: ZHL (1937-1959); Radio Singapore (1959-1982); Radio 1 (1982-1995); One FM 90.5 (1995-1998)
- Former frequencies: 630 kHz (1 March 1937 – 31 December 1993)

Technical information
- Licensing authority: IMDA
- Transmitter coordinates: 1.2957°N 103.7923°E

Links
- Webcast: TuneIn; MeListen
- Website: Gold 90.5

Gold905 is an English-language radio station in Singapore. Owned by the state-owned media conglomerate Mediacorp, it broadcasts a classic hits format.

The station's origins date to the beginning of regulated radio broadcasting in Singapore. It first signed on in 1937 under the call sign ZHL; as Singapore's sole radio station, it initially carried blocks of programmes in all four of the region's main languages; programming in Chinese varieties, Malay, and Tamil would gradually move to dedicated stations as Radio Singapore expanded, leaving ZHL as primarily being an English-language outlet.

It was renamed Radio 1 in 1982; by then it offered a full-service format featuring news programming and middle of the road music. In 1998, news programming was relocated to the new NewsRadio 93.8, and 90.5 relaunched under its current name as an oldies station.

== History ==
The station was awarded a licence in 1935 under the auspices of the British Malaya Broadcasting Corporation. Broadcasting began on 1 March 1937, roughly two months after the expiry of the previous radio station in Singapore, ZHI. The new station carried the callsign ZHL, and broadcast on an AM medium wave frequency of 630 kHz (which remained unchanged after the Geneva Frequency Plan of 1975, as it was already on a multiple of 9 kHz), and began FM transmissions in 1967. On 1 January 1994, AM broadcasting was discontinued in Singapore in favour of FM.

Until late-1945, the station, as the country's then-sole radio station, broadcast language-based block programming aimed at the local population in English, Chinese varieties, Malay and Tamil. Over time, its language-based programmes were diffused onto separate stations serving specific language groups, leaving ZHL as the English-language service of Radio Singapore. On 1 January 1982, the Singapore Broadcasting Corporation rebranded its stations, with the English service being rebranded as Radio 1.

On 28 October 1989, Radio 1 began airing "mellow, middle-of-the-road music" on weekday afternoons through a seven-hour programme block.

One FM became Gold 90.5 on 2 July 1998, playing music from the 1970s, golden oldies and country, with plans to include contemporary jazz and Latin American pop. News content moved to NewsRadio 93.8. In 2016, the station introduced new Saturday evening shows devoted to classic rock (Rock of Ages) and disco (Solid Gold) as part of a revamp of its DJ lineup.

== See also ==
- List of radio stations in Singapore
