= YES 933 =

Radio station based in Singapore

- Singapore
- Broadcast area: Singapore
- Frequency: 93.3 MHz

Programming
- Language: Mandarin
- Format: Top 40 (CHR) (Mandopop/K-pop)

Ownership
- Owner: Mediacorp
- Sister stations: Capital 958; Love 972

History
- First air date: 1 January 1990; 36 years ago

Technical information
- ERP: 6,000 watts

Links
- Webcast: MeListen; TuneIn
- Website: YES 933

YES 933 is a Mandarin Chinese radio station in Singapore. Owned by the state-owned broadcaster Mediacorp, it carries a contemporary hit radio format focusing on Chinese and Korean pop music.

The station has historically been one of the most listened to in Singapore; in a 2025 survey, Nielsen reported that the station had an average of 1.22 million listeners.

== History ==
In December 1989, the Singapore Broadcasting Corporation (SBC) announced plans for two new radio stations to launch in 1990, in honour of SBC's 10th anniversary and Singapore's 25th anniversary of independence; a Mandopop CHR station on 93.3 FM (which would serve as a Chinese counterpart to English CHR Perfect 10, which launched earlier that year), and an unnamed "MOR" station on 95.5 FM. The Mandopop station launched on 1 January 1990 as YES 933, also known as Radio 6; at launch, the station had nine deejays on four-to-five-hour shifts, and aired fewer commercials than that of Radio 3.

YES 933 began as an 18-hour station, broadcasting from 06:00 to 00:00. Broadcasting hours were extended to 02:00 in December of the same year, making it the first Chinese radio station to offer music after midnight. It finally went 24 hours on 1 May 1994.

In 1997, 93.3 was the most-listened radio station in Singapore for the fifth year since 1993, with almost a million weekly listeners.

On 20 January 2017, the station moved from Caldecott Hill to Mediacorp's new headquarters at One-north.

== Staff ==
=== Full Time DJs ===
- 陈宁 Chen Ning
- 吴万隆 Jeff Goh (Joined Love 972 in 2008, subsequently joined Yes 933 in 2013)
- 高美贵 Gao Meigui (Previously in charge of promotions at Love 972 but subsequently joined Yes 933 as a DJ in 2017)
- 萧嘉蕙 Siau Jiahui
- 陈廷丰 Tan Ting Fong (Jeff)
- 钟坤华 Kenneth Zhong Kunhua
- 张颖双 Hazelle Teo Yingshuang
- 陈启佳 Evelyn Tan Qijia
- 朱泽亮 Zhu Zeliang
- 林品隽 Lim Pin Juen
- 郑宇容 Joey Tay Yu Rong

=== Part Time DJs ===
- 黄柏荣 Gerald Ng Borong
- 高伟杰 Dominic Koek Weijie
- 王顺达 Yutaki Ong Shunda
- 陈泳渝 Chen Yongyu

=== Former Notable DJs/Management who went to other Mediacorp Stations or Departments ===
- 林灵芝 Lin Lingzhi (crossed over to UFM 1003 then to Capital 958)
- 巫许玛莉 Bukoh Mary (crossed over to Capital 958 in 2012 then to Love 972 in 2017)
- 周崇庆 Dennis Chew (crossed over to Love 972 in 2013)
- 林佩芬 Christina Lim Peifen (Joined Mediacorp’s Chinese news and current affairs section after leaving Yes 933)
- 丁志勇 Cruz Teng (former DJ/Assistant Programme Director, later joined SMRT Corporation as communications lead, returned to Capital 958 in 2026) [1]

=== Former Notable DJ/Management who went to competitor stations ===
- 谢家发 Xie Jiafa (Resigned in 2017, joined 883Jia in 2018)
- 陈艾薇 Ivy Tan (Resigned in 2015, crossed over to 883Jia in 2018)
- 陈彦维 Chen Yanwei (Resigned in 2017, returned to UFM 1003 in 2018)
- 蔡伟彬 Nico Chua Weibin (Resigned in 2021, joined 883Jia in 2022)

=== Former Notable DJs/Management who left the industry ===
- 古德文 Gu Dewen (crossed over to Mediacorp TV, later left to start NoonTalk talent agency)
- 刘宇恒 Henry Law (joined the Singapore Navy after leaving Yes 933)

== Shows produced ==
- Dear DJ (亲愛的九月)
- Hey DJ! (校园新生代 Hey DJ!)
- The Story Between Us (我们之间的故事)
- Campushunter (校园搜查队)
- Pick of the Pops (醉心龙虎榜), the station's music chart.

== See also ==
- List of radio stations in Singapore
