= 987FM =

Mediacorp-owned English radio station in Singapore

987
- Singapore
- Broadcast area: Singapore; Johor Bahru/Johor Bahru District (Malaysia); Batam/Batam Islands, Riau Islands (Indonesia)
- Frequency: 98.7 MHz

Programming
- Language: English (Singlish)
- Format: Contemporary hit radio

Ownership
- Owner: Mediacorp

History
- First air date: 1 January 1989; 37 years ago

Links
- Webcast: Me listen; TuneIn
- Website: 987FM

987 is an English-language radio station of the state-owned broadcaster Mediacorp in Singapore. It broadcasts a contemporary hit radio format. The station launched on 1 January 1989 as Perfect 10 98.7 FM.

== History ==
=== Perfect 10 (1989–2005) ===
The station launched at midnight on 1 January 1989 as Perfect 10 98.7 FM (or, formally, Radio 10); the station was aimed towards youth, and would broadcast a mix of current and classic pop music. Its on-air branding referred to a format of broadcasting "top 10" music from the past decade. The Singapore Broadcasting Corporation (SBC) surveyed students of local post-secondary institutions to help tailor the station to the preferences of youth audiences. Perfect 10 would emphasize music and DJ-led programmes, with fewer interruptions for news and commercials.

The station would compete at launch with Zoo 101.5 from Batam, Riau, Indonesia; the station had a sizable audience in Singapore and had attracted advertisers from there, with advertising rates double those of SBC.

An SBC survey in September 1989 revealed that 40% of listeners tuned in to Perfect 10, compared to 33% listenership for Radio 3 (Mandarin), and 25% listenership for Radio 2 (Malay). With the launch of adult contemporary station Class 95 in April 1990, Perfect 10 dropped its classic hits skew and segued to a straight contemporary hit radio format.

In 1994, the station began hosting the Perfect 10 Music Awards, a presentation honouring achievements in Singaporean and international popular music.

=== 987 (2005–present) ===
On 27 June 2005, the station rebranded as 987. 987's studio moved out of Caldecott Broadcast Centre on 19 July 2010 and it broadcast from *SCAPE along Orchard Road at 2 Orchard Link for three years. 987 moved back to Caldecott Broadcast Centre on 20 May 2013 after its tenancy with *SCAPE expired.

In March 2010, it was announced that former beauty queen, Ris Low, would be joining the station, co-hosting the Shan and Rozz show. There was some outrage among listeners over her employment as a DJ due to her poor command and diction of English. On the first day of co-hosting the show, Low arrived late and left early, and Rozz stormed off the studio after an argument. On 1 April, it was later revealed that it was an April Fools' Day joke by the show and Burger King in an advertising campaign for the Angry Whopper.

In March 2012, Shan Wee left 987. In February 2012, a 'ManHunt' was conducted to find a replacement for Rozz's co-host on the morning show. Listeners were invited to audition for the spot from 12 to 16 March 2012 and were told that they stood a chance of getting a spot on 987. However, it turned out that Rozz's new co-host is Bobby Tonelli from neighbour radio station, Class 95. It was speculated that the auditions were a waste of time and effort and simply just an advertising strategy to gain more listenership.

On 17 January 2017, the 987 studio moved out of Caldecott Broadcast Centre and into the new Mediacorp Campus at one-north.

== Incidents ==
In May 2007, The Muttons were suspended for a while due to their participation in No Bra Day, an activity that was sponsored by FHM Singapore and featured young models competing to see who could remove their bras in the fastest time possible. A video taken in the studio was posted on YouTube and the resulting uproar from viewers forced the station to pay S$9,800 to the Media Development Authority for 'inappropriate and offensive content'. Muttons in the Morning was then replaced with The Dan and Young Show. They soon came back to 987 in July 2007 for the late night slot show, now called Muttons To Midnight.

In July 2009, Chew Soo Wei, was sacked by the programming director, Daniel Ong, over alleged claims of failing to put on an American accent and issues with proficiency of the English language. Listeners expressed disdain that it was unfair for DJs with local accents to be discriminated while DJs who speak with an American accent receive preferential treatment.

== See also ==
- List of radio stations in Singapore
