= Class95 =

Class 95
- Singapore
- Broadcast area: Singapore; Johor Bahru/Johor Bahru District (Malaysia); Batam/Batam Islands, Riau Islands (Indonesia)
- Frequency: 95.0 MHz

Programming
- Language: English
- Format: Hot adult contemporary

Ownership
- Owner: Mediacorp

History
- First air date: 1 April 1990; 36 years ago

Technical information
- Transmitter coordinates: 1.2957°N 103.7923°E

Links
- Webcast: MeListen; TuneIn; Online Radio Box
- Website: CLASS 95

Class 95 is an English-language radio station in Singapore. Owned by the state-owned broadcaster Mediacorp, it broadcasts a hot adult contemporary format. The station launched on 1 April 1990.

In a 2022 survey, Nielsen ranked Class 95 as Singapore's highest-rated English-language radio station, and third-highest-rated station overall, with an average audience of 877,000 listeners.

== History ==
In December 1989, Singapore Broadcasting Corporation (SBC) announced plans for two new radio stations to launch in 1990 in honour of its 10th anniversary and Singapore's 25th anniversary; a Mandopop station on 93.3 (serving as a Chinese counterpart to the recently launched English pop station Perfect 10), and an unnamed "MOR" station.

The new MOR station launched on 1 April 1990 as Class 95, carrying an adult contemporary format targeting an "upmarket" audience. The station's positioning was exemplified by pre-launch television commercials, which featured imagery of luxury goods such as champagne and jewellery. "Class" was one of three names considered by SBC for the station, alongside "Light" and "Heart".

== See also ==
- List of radio stations in Singapore
