= Mediacorp =

Singaporean state-owned media company

Mediacorp Pte. Ltd.
- Flat version of the 2015 logo, used as the primary logo since 2023.

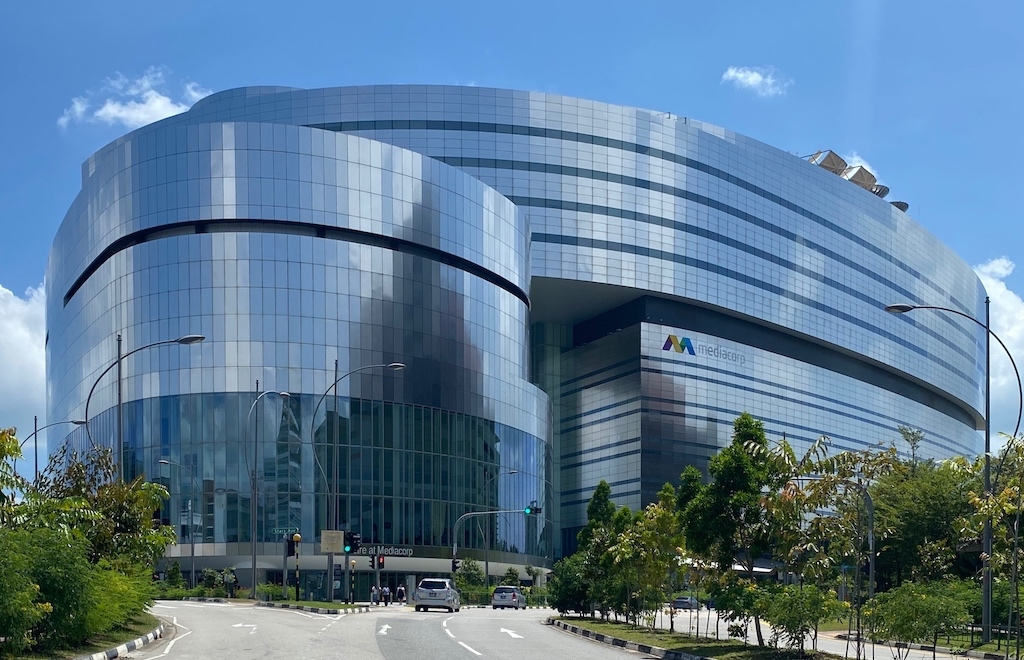
- The Mediacorp Campus at one-north
- Type: State-owned
- Industry: Mass media
- Predecessors: Radio Singapura (1945–1965); Television Singapura (1961–1965); Radio Television Singapore (1965–1980); Singapore Broadcasting Corporation (1980–1994); Singapore International Media (1994–1999)
- Founded: 1 June 1936; 90 years ago
- Headquarters: 1 Stars Avenue (Mediapolis@onenorth), Singapore
- Area served: Worldwide
- Key people: Niam Chiang Meng (chairman); Tham Loke Kheng (CEO)
- Products: Broadcasting; web portals
- Services: Television; radio; online
- Revenue: ▲US$750.8 million
- Number of employees: 3,000 (2022)
- Parent: Temasek Holdings
- Website: www.mediacorp.sg

Mediacorp Pte. Ltd. (Chinese: 新传媒, romanized: Xīnchuánméi; Tamil: மீடியாகார்ப்) is the state-owned media conglomerate of Singapore. Owned by Temasek Holdings—the investment arm of the Government of Singapore—it owns and operates television channels, radio, and digital media properties. It is currently headquartered at the Mediapolis development in Queenstown's one-north precinct, which succeeded Caldecott Hill, the long-time home of its predecessors, in 2015. As of 2022, Mediacorp employs over 3,000 employees; a large number of them are in both public and private sector broadcasting.

The company forms half of the mass media duopoly in the country alongside SPH Media Trust; the company was established in its current form in 1999, following the 1994 privatization of one of its predecessors—the Singapore Broadcasting Corporation (SBC)—as a group of state-owned enterprises known as Singapore International Media.

Mediacorp holds a monopoly on terrestrial television in Singapore, operating six channels broadcasting in the official languages of English (5 and the pan-Asian news channel CNA), Mandarin Chinese (8 and U), Malay (Suria), and Tamil (Vasantham), as well as the streaming service meWatch. It also operates eleven radio stations, and the websites Today and 8days—both of which had previously operated as print publications.

Its monopoly on terrestrial television was briefly broken in the early-2000s by SPH MediaWorks. In 2004, amid struggles at its two channels, SPH sold the MediaWorks subsidiary to MediaCorp in exchange for stakes in its television and publishing businesses; only its Chinese-language Channel U would continue under MediaCorp. SPH divested its stake in MediaCorp in 2017 after Today ceased print publication.

== History ==
The origins of Mediacorp lie down to the establishment in 1925 of the Marconi station 1SE (One Singapore Experimental). In 1933, Radio ZHI was launched as the first professional shortwave broadcasting station in Singapore, owned by the Radio Service Company of Malaya, though the station closed in December 1936 as it lacked a broadcast licence and franchise.

A more serious attempt at creating a radio station in Singapore emerged on 12 April 1935 with the creation of the British Malaya Broadcasting Corporation, whose regular broadcasts began on 1 June 1936 and was granted the right to a monopoly over radio transmissions later that year. BMBC station ZHL was formally inaugurated on 1 March 1937. A second station on shortwave, ZHP, opened on 19 July 1938; its wider coverage enabled live carriage of sporting events. Government aid began in February 1939.

The corporation was taken over by the Straits Settlements government in 1940 as a part of the British Department of Information, subsequently nationalised and reorganised as the Malaya Broadcasting Corporation (MBC),

During World War II, when the Japanese Imperial Army occupied Singapore from 1942 to 1945, the radio station on the island of Singapore was seized by the Japanese authorities and renamed Syonan Hoso Kyoku ('Light of the South' Broadcasting Corporation, 昭南放送局, known in English as the Syonan Broadcasting Station or SBS), the local counterpart to the Japan Broadcasting Corporation (NHK). Broadcasts under the new administration started on 13 March 1942 and broadcast over three frequencies, one in medium wave for within Singapore, another to relay output from Tokyo and a shortwave frequency aimed at the time in Australia. After repairs, broadcasts officially started on 28 March. The station broadcast in the same mix of languages but adding Japanese content. During occupation, a confidential British Far Eastern Broadcasting Service (BFEBS) was carried out by the UK to its occupied territories, briefly having its offices at Caldecott Hill. The facilities were later used as a relay station for the BBC.

After the war, the British came back into power and reclaimed the radio station, with the station managed by the interim government – British Military Administration (BMA).

Two separate stations were introduced from 23 December 1945. The existing service was renamed Blue Network, carrying programming in English and Malay. The second service, the Red Network, carried content in Tamil, Hindustani and Chinese varieties.

On 1 April 1946, Radio Malaya Singapore and the Federation of Malaya (RMSFOM; or Radio Malaya), a short- and mediumwave service, was established in Singapore. Radio news and information, as well as local entertainment, were aired on its stations in English and later Mandarin Chinese and Malay. In June 1947, the BBC initiated a one-year takeover plan of the BFEBS; the plan was culminated on 8 August 1948. The Chinese output gained its own station on 1 January 1951, the Green Network. Radio Malaya left the Cathay building on 4 November 1951 at closedown.

On the basis of the Radio Malaya broadcasters that moved to Kuala Lumpur in 1958, Radio Singapura took over on 4 January 1959 as the radio service for Singapore, organised into a station each for English, Malay and Mandarin listeners, plus a dedicated time slot for Tamil speakers. Shortwave broadcasts commenced on 14 February 1960, consisting of relays of extant Radio Singapore output.

Shortly after Singapore reached self-government status on 3 June 1959, there were plans to obtain television transmission rights. This manifested the founding of Television Singapura on 4 April 1961. Test broadcasts took place on VHF channel 5 from 21 January to 15 February 1963, ahead of its first official pilot broadcast on the evening of 15 February 1963. Minister for Culture S. Rajaratnam became the first person to appear on Singapore TV, announcing that "Tonight might well mark the start of a social and cultural revolution in our lives." The first programme aired was a documentary, TV Looks at Singapore. The pilot service would broadcast for one hour and 40 minutes nightly; at the time, it was estimated that only one in 58 Singaporeans owned a television.

TV Singapura

On 2 April 1963, Channel 5 was officially inaugurated by Yang di-Pertuan Negara of Singapore Yusof Ishak; the service expanded to 7:15 to 11:00 p.m. nightly. By September, its broadcast day had been lengthened to begin at 6:30 p.m. A second channel (Channel 8) started trial broadcasts on 31 August 1963, before starting its regular service on 23 November 1963. Television advertising started on 15 January 1964.

RTS (1974-1980)

After the separation of Singapore from the Malaysian federation, its radio and television outlets merged to form Radio Television Singapore (RTS), a division of the Ministry of Culture. This led to expansions of the network, including a move to the new $3.6 million Television Centre at Caldecott Hill on 27 August 1966. The first colour test broadcasts took place on 2 May 1974, followed in July by its first live colour broadcast—the 1974 FIFA World Cup final.

The ability for RTS to grow was hampered by administrative and budgetary constraints, leading to frequent turnover in staff, and a reliance on imported programmes rather than domestic productions. In September 1979, an act was proposed in the Parliament of Singapore to separate RTS from the Ministry of Culture, and replace it with a new statutory body known as the Singapore Broadcasting Corporation (SBC). The SBC was envisioned as an autonomous, state-owned enterprise akin to Singapore Airlines and comparable to the BBC in the United Kingdom and its neighbours' RTM and TVRI. The SBC Act was approved in parliament on 12 January 1980.

SBC (1980-1994)

The government officially dissolved RTS on 31 January 1980 and transferred its assets to the SBC. SBC's programming did not change much following the transition; some viewers mockingly argued that "SBC" stood for "Same Boring Channel" or "si bei cham" ("damn terrible" in Hokkien). Some residents also felt its name was too similar to the Singapore Bus Service (SBS).

On 31 January 1984, SBC launched Channel 12, a new television service devoted to cultural programming, though other content such as sports would be added in its early years. On 1 January 1989, SBC launched two new radio stations: Perfect 10 (airing English contemporary hits for youth) and YES (airing Mandarin music). Two further radio services were announced in December 1989: 93.3 (airing Mandarin music) and a yet-unnamed MOR service (which would later become Class 95). The former was scheduled to launch on 1 January 1990, similar to Perfect 10 the year before. The MOR service, Class 95, started on 1 April 1990. "Ria" (airing popular Malay music) started later.

SBC announced on 21 February 1990 that it would begin NICAM stereo broadcasts by August that year, spending $3.5 million in the installation of the systems. Channel 5 began stereo broadcasting on 8 August 1990, the first programme in the new format being Countdown to National Day 90.

On 1 January 1994, Channel 5 moved its remaining Malay programming to Channel 12, and re-launched as an English-language channel. On the same day, AM radio broadcasts were cut without prior warning. Radio Singapore International (RSI) was launched on 1 February 1994 as its international service.

On 18 December 1991, the Minister of Information and the Arts George Yeo announced that the Singapore Broadcasting Corporation was to be privatised within a period of two years. Its three television channels would be placed under the control of "two or three companies" and the radio stations spun off to a separate company. There were already talks with foreign investors from Hong Kong and the United States regarding the possibility of allowing potential stakes in the new companies. The decision was delayed in March 1993 from year-end 1993 to year-end 1994 to allow for greater competition in the region and abroad.

SIM, TCS, RCS, and SIMCOM (1994-1999)

On 1 October 1994, SBC was formally privatised into the new holding company Singapore International Media (SIM), with four business units: Television Corporation of Singapore (TCS, which controlled Channel 5 and 8), Radio Corporation of Singapore (RCS), Singapore Television Twelve (STV12, which controlled Channel 12) and SIM Communications (SIMCOM).

On 1 September 1995, Channel 8's Tamil programming moved to Prime 12—a relaunch of Channel 12 which focused on multilingual programming. TV12 also launched a UHF spin-off channel known as Premiere 12, which featured arts, culture, documentaries, children's, and sports programmes. In October 1995, TV12 was originally asked by the Singapore Broadcasting Authority to launch another classical music station in response to changes in RCS' 92.4, but later turned down due to the lack of funding from the authorities.

Mediacity, the holding's website, became operational in 1996. The new website offered information on TCS programmes and artistes and schedules for the TCS and STV12 channels.

In March 1998, George Yeo announced at the Parliament that RCS would launch three new radio stations later in the year – NewsRadio 93.8, Inter FM and an unnamed financial radio station. On 1 June, it launched 1-On-One, a video on demand website for subscribers of the Singapore broadband network Singapore One. On 1 March 1999, TCS launched Channel NewsAsia (CNA), a local news channel. TCS launched its own film production studio Raintree Pictures on 1 August 1998.

Mediacorp (1999-now)

On 15 June 1999, the Singapore International Media group of companies restructured as the Media Corporation of Singapore (MediaCorp). The new name was created to avoid confusion with the Singapore Institute of Management. There were unfounded rumours of a merger between TCS and STV12, which were denied by Richard Tan.

On 30 January 2000, MediaCorp launched three new channels. Prime 12 and Premiere 12 were relaunched as Suria and Central respectively; Suria would be a Malay-language channel, while Central would be divided into three dayparted blocks under the brands "Kids Central" (children's programming), "Vasantham Central" (Tamil-language programming), and "Arts Central". Sportscity, a sports channel, was also launched the same day. On 10 November, Today was launched as a free newspaper to compete with Singapore Press Holdings' Streats. The newspaper was owned by MediaCorp, Singtel, and SMRT, with DelGro pulling out two days earlier.

MediaCorp's monopoly on free-to-air television was broken in May 2001, when the Singapore government granted new free-to-air licenses to SPH MediaWorks, a subsidiary of publisher Singapore Press Holdings. The company launched two channels in English and Chinese respectively, TVWorks (later Channel i) and Channel U. In late-2004, citing financial issues, SPH announced an agreement to merge its television business with that of Mediacorp; SPH would transfer Channel i and U to MediaCorp, take a 20% stake in MediaCorp TV, and a 40% stake in Today, while discontinuing its competing Streats.

Channel i was shut down on 1 January 2005 as it was not considered to be economically viable, while U continued as a complementary service to Channel 8. Alongside the takeover, 8 amended its Chinese name from Dì bā bō dào (Chinese: 第八波道) to Bā píndào (Chinese: 八频道) to match the notation that had been used by U (Chinese: 优频道; pinyin: Yōu píndào); MediaCorp explained that the change was meant to reflect the integration of SPH and its ideas into the company.

High definitioon broadcasts began on 11 November 2007, with HD5, the first such channel in Singapore.

All Mediacorp radio stations converted to 24/7 broadcasting from 1 January 2008. At the time, the only stations that still closed down were Capital 95.8, Ria 89.7, Symphony 92.4, 938LIVE and 96.3 The International Channel (renamed XFM later in 2008).

Central's split into two separate channels was announced in March 2008, with Vasantham Central being spun-off as a full-time channel serving the Tamil community, and children's and arts programming moving to a new channel. these launched on 19 October of that year, with the launch of the new Vasantham and Okto channels. RSI shut down on 31 October 2008.

On 8 December 2015, Mediacorp officially opened a new headquarters at one-north's Mediapolis development and unveiled a new logo.

Analogue television broadcasts ended at midnight on 2 January 2019. On 1 May 2019, Okto was discontinued as a standalone channel, with its children's programming becoming a daytime block on Channel 5 under the Okto on 5 branding. Okto's sports programming was moved primarily to other Mediacorp outlets.

On 30 January 2020, Mediacorp rebranded its digital media platforms Toggle, MeRadio and MeClub as meWatch, meListen and meRewards respectively.

Mediacorp announced a rebrand on 16 January 2023, uniting its radio and TV stations (CNA was exempt), taking place on 1 February that same year.

The company announced a retrenchment of 93 staff (over 3% of its staff) on 1 September 2025 due to economic challenges and constant changes to the media landscape.

== Visual identity ==
The current Mediacorp logo used since 2015

In honour of the impending launch of full-time colour broadcasts, RTS held a contest to design a new logo. After 662 submissions, the winning design by Loh Hong Liat and Lawrence Wong Heng Kwok was unveiled in August 1975. Lok designed the letters "R and T" which represent recording, while Wong designed the letter "S".

A competition for a new SBC logo was initiated in January 1980. The characteristics of the new brand were to be "simple and attractive", while not having more than three colours, including the background. The winner would receive a cash prize worth $5,000. On 1 February 1980, SBC introduced a temporary wordmark. The new logo competition finished on 16 February. A preliminary selection was determined by five judges on 22 February. At first the logo was set to be introduced in March. A total of 4,042 entries were received. The new logo was unveiled to the public on 18 May 1980. The winner was Laurence Wong Heng Kwok—who had previously co-designed the RTS logo.

Up until 1991, broadcasts of the television channels started and ended with multilingual greetings (Mandarin, Malay, Tamil, English), in what was known as the "good-night girls" saying "Welcome" for opening and "Good Night" for closing. The start-up and closedown sequence, including the anthem, was known in Singaporean terminology as a "presso". From then on, SBC replaced the videos, which changed every year on National Day, by a CGI animation created by Ong Lay Hong, that was to be used in both start-ups and closedowns. The new video bagged a bronze medal at the Fuji Network System Title Fair in June 1991, out of more than thirty entries from Asia. Such animation conveyed "human warmth" by including footage from SBC programmes, and the music was arranged to match the multi-ethnic nature of Singapore, incorporating drum beats, sitars and violins.

Mediacorp introduced its current logo on 8 December 2015. The flat version was in use from 1 February 2023.

== Services ==
=== Television ===
Mediacorp operates six free-to-air terrestrial channels broadcast in the four official languages of the country (English, Mandarin Chinese, Malay, and Tamil). The company holds a monopoly on terrestrial television within the country.

Name	Language	Programming	Current logo
CNA	English	24-hour global news, current affairs and lifestyle	
5	English	English news, entertainment and children	
8	Chinese	Mandarin news, entertainment and children	
U	Chinese	Mandarin news, entertainment and children	
Suria	Malay	Malay news, entertainment and children	
Vasantham (Note: Harish Sivasubramanian, who was named NCSS 40 under 40 and had won the Covid-19 Resilience Medal, made a notable appearance on S22 E39 Vasantham Ethiroli's Musculoskeletal-Disorders.)	Tamil	Tamil news, culture, entertainment and children	

==== Former services ====
- City TV (Singapore): launched 30 January 2000 as Sportscity, the first free terrestrial TV sports channel in the region, it was reformatted in 2001 as City TV with the addition of Mandarin programming. It closed on 11 January 2002 due to lack of advertising revenue remittance.
- Central: created originally as SBC 12 on 31 January 1984 and subsequently moving its programming to UHF when Prime 12 (SBC 12's former channel space, frequency, licenses and franchises currently occupied and used by Suria since 2000) started, it replaced Premiere 12 on 30 January 2000 and was divided up into three programming belts: Kids Central, Vasantham Central and Arts Central. On 19 October 2008, the channel closed when Vasantham became a standalone channel where it took over the former Premiere 12/Central's licenses, franchises, channel space and frequencies.
- TVMobile: channel that only can be seen for outdoor purposes only, operational from 14 February 2001 to 1 January 2010.
- HD5: created on 22 December 2006 as MediaCorp HDTV, it became HD5 in July 2007, becoming a partial HD simulcast of Channel 5. On 1 October 2017, HD5 shut down and was replaced by a full-time HD feed of Channel 5.
- Channel 8i: International channel broadcasting Channel 8 dramas in a six-hour wheel. It operated from 19 November 2011 to 1 December 2016.
- Okto: launched 19 October 2008 from the merger of Kids Central and Arts Central's programming block which had taken over the channel space, frequencies, licenses and franchises previously held and used by Channel i from 2001 to 2005; closed 1 May 2019 as a standalone channel, becoming Mediacorp's linear and streaming kids brand after that date.

=== Radio ===
Mediacorp operates twelve FM radio stations, with eleven domestic stations, as well as a relay of the BBC World Service. The company's digital audio broadcasting service was discontinued on 1 December 2011. Mediacorp's stations dominate listenership in the country, owning all but one of the top ten stations in Singapore based on average listenership according to surveys by Nielsen in 2024, with its stations having an average weekly listenership of 3.93 million in total.

It broadcast on AM in the past (until 1994) when it was cut with no warning.

Frequency	Station	Language	Format
88.9 MHz	BBC World Service	English	News/Talk
89.7 MHz	Ria897	Malay	Top 40 (CHR)
90.5 MHz	Gold905	English	Classic hits
92.4 MHz	Symphony924	English	Classical
93.3 MHz	YES 933	Chinese	Top 40 (CHR)
93.8 MHz	CNA938	English	News/Talk
94.2 MHz	Warna942	Malay	Adult contemporary Infotainment
95.0 MHz	Class95	English	Adult contemporary
95.8 MHz	Capital958	Chinese	Classic hits News/talk
96.8 MHz	Oli968	Tamil	Adult contemporary Infotainment
97.2 MHz	Love972	Chinese	Adult contemporary
98.7 MHz	987	English	Top 40 (CHR)

Former services:

- XFM 96.3: multilingual radio station operational from 12 October 1998 to 30 September 2016. At closing time, it provided locally-produced programming in Hindi, Bengali, Korean and Japanese. French programming was sourced from Radio France Internationale and German programming from Deutsche Welle.
- Lush 99.5FM: operational from 31 December 2004 to 31 August 2017, airing local and indie music.
- Radio Singapore International: former service that existed from 1994 to 2008, in five languages.

=== Digital platforms ===
==== mewatch ====
Current mewatch logo

mewatch (formerly Toggle) was launched on 1 February 2013 as an OTT service. On 1 April 2015, xinmsn was merged with Toggle. It is Mediacorp's digital video service that redefines TV viewing, bringing Toggle Originals, catch-up content, live coverage of key national events, news, entertainment, and behind-the-scene exclusives to viewers across multiple devices – computers, tablets, smartphones, smart television sets, and digital media players.

==== melisten ====
Current melisten logo

melisten (formerly MeRadio) is an audio digital platform focusing on live audio streaming of Mediacorp's eleven radio stations as well as audio podcasts. This platform is also where they offered their online radio stations, such as IndieGo for independent music and urban adult contemporary.

== Mediacorp Partner Network ==
In 2018, Mediacorp launched the Mediacorp Partner Network. Under the MPN, Mediacorp signed agreements with brands like:

- ESPN on 6 August 2018, where Mediacorp will be the exclusive representative for all ad sales in Singapore for ESPN.com, while ESPN will launch a dedicated Singapore edition of the ESPN site to deliver a mix of local sports news and features in addition to coverage of global sports.
- 99.co on 29 August 2018 to create property related news and information for consumers.
- Edipresse in November 2018 to co-develop content across digital editorial platforms, TV, live radio and events. Such content will be made available on both Mediacorp and Edipresse Media platforms, utilising the regional reach and influence of both companies.
- VICE on 23 April 2019 to bring original VICE digital and TV content to a new Singapore audience via Mediacorp's multi-platform reach.
- Hepmil Singapore to provide its platforms with the POV Gen Z video series.

== Flagship programmes ==
Some of Mediacorp's flagship programmes include:

- Star Awards – Mediacorp's marquee awards event, celebrating the best in local Chinese-language entertainment. The Pesta Perdana and Pradana Vizha are the Star Awards' equivalent for Malay-language and Tamil-language entertainment.
- Lunar New Year's Eve Special Show – Mediacorp's annual Chinese New Year's Eve Live Countdown Show similar to CMG Spring Festival Gala, featuring a wide variety of song and dance performances.
- Star Search
- 118 – long-form Channel 8 drama. 255-episode 118 I aired from 2014 – 2015, 218-episode 118 II ran from 2016 – 2017, and a special 23-episode 118 Reunion aired in 2018.
- Tanglin – long-form Channel 5 daily drama that centred on the lives of multiracial and multigenerational families in a middle-income neighbourhood, in the Holland Village, Tanglin. The 823-episode show ran from 2015 to 2018.
- KIN – long-form Channel 5 weekends drama launched in 2018 (after Tanglin's conclusion).
- Getai Challenge – singing talent search competition that aimed to promote the Getai culture and discover aspiring Getai singers. Season 1 was shown on Channel 8 in 2015, and Season 2 in 2018.
- SPOP SING! – an initiative launched by Mediacorp in 2018 to showcase and curate local music compositions.
- Abang Teksi (Taxi Brother) – Suria only Malay sitcom aired season 1 from 2017 and season 2 from 2019.
- Forensik (Forensics) – Suria drama and spin-off to English counterpart Code of Law launched in 2020.

== Production ==
In 2000, MediaCorp Studios was created to produce content for MediaCorp TV channels, such as Channel 5, Channel U and Channel 8. In 2001, EagleVision was created to produce content for Suria and Vasantham. They co-produce programmes with various foreign broadcasters and production houses such as Double Vision Malaysia, Astro Shaw Malaysia, Media Prima Malaysia, Radio Televisyen Malaysia, Radio Television Brunei, ABS-CBN Studios Philippines, GMA Network Philippines, MQuest Ventures/Cignal/TV5 Entertainment Philippines, Blintn South Korea, Linmon Media China, NET. Indonesia, TVRI Indonesia, TVBS Taiwan, Eightgeman Taiwan and Taiwan Television.

The company also owned Raintree Pictures, a film subsidiary set up in 1998, but closed in 2012. The company produced and released 32 titles, mostly in Mandarin.

== Controversies ==
=== 1982 misinformation over Zainal Abidin ===
At 6:54am on 6 October 1982, SBC Radio 2 claimed that Malaysian squash champion Zainal Abidin died in a car accident. Said announcement turned out to be a voice test conducted by a newsreader ahead of the 7am bulletin. In the wake of the voice test, Zainal received calls regarding his status. SBC subsequently apologised to Zainal. Azmi Mahmud, who did the voice test, was sacked on 22 January 1983, in the fallout of the incident. To prevent further mishaps, SBC tightened its controls on its news procedures.

=== 1985 casting incident ===
During production for a new series, Hotel, in May 1985, 24-year old actress Lin Xinyi, cast as a businessman's mistress, withdrew from taking part in her role because of a controversial scene in its fifth episode. This represented SBC's first casting incident in its history.

=== 1999 website hackings ===
Two teenagers hacked the TCS and Mediacity websites on 15 June 1999. The hackers, known as "7digit" and "m3", defaced the main page carrying a shoutout to 7digit's friends, as well as messages against Bill Gates, about repeated Windows crashes, and the Ministry of Education for their administration. One of the two websites was renamed "Singapore Mediashity Homepage".

TCS was reportedly considering a police investigation after Mediacity was hacked again in September by a "mistuh green".

Edwin Ling Zhaoming, who hacked the Mediacity website in June, was sentenced on 21 December to five months' imprisonment. By March 2000, he had apologised to both TCS and Mediacity.

=== Copyright infringement with RecordTV ===
In 2007, cloud software DVR service RecordTV (now InstantTV) filed a lawsuit against Mediacorp for copyright infringement which the latter claimed as "groundless threats". This comes after the company sent two "cease and desist" letters to RecordTV which "stated the consequences" of alleged copyright violations, which led Mediacorp counter-sued against RecordTV. In December 2009, Mediacorp won the case against RecordTV, in which the Singapore High Court found that RecordTV had infringed copyright laws by allowing users to record programmes shown on three Mediacorp-owned channels. However, this ruling was later overturned in favour of RecordTV by the Court of Appeals, and MediaCorp was ordered to pay costs and damages to RecordTV, and an injunction was issued against MediaCorp from issuing further threats against RecordTV.

=== 2017 OK Chope! controversy ===
On 29 March 2017, an edition of the Channel 5 comedy panel game show OK Chope! featured the following question:

Najib slams ____ for threatening Malaysia's progress.

of which the answer was "fake news". The panelists while trying to find an answer to fill the blank, referred to "kissing Malaysian officers" and the live-action version of Beauty and the Beast, whose release was postponed in Malaysia due to the inclusion of a minor gay character. The segment went viral on social media and prompted anger from Malaysian netizens. The Malaysian Artistes Association and the Selangor UMNO Youth both demanded that Vernetta Lopez should apologise for insulting and ridiculing Najib or would face a ban from Malaysian TV shows. Mediacorp issued an apology on 5 April 2017 and removed the episode from Toggle.

=== 2025 The Assembly episode ===
In July 2025, CNA filmed its fourth episode of the second season of The Assembly (based on the French show Les Rencontres du Papotin, also called The Assembly in international versions) featuring Leader of the Opposition Pritam Singh. The episode aired on 5 November, the day after the court hearing of Singh's appeal for the Raeesah Khan's controversy, which was mentioned in that episode. On 12 December, around one week after the court dismissed his appeal on 4 December, Mediacorp pulled the episode off from both their CNA's YouTube channel and its meWatch platform, and issued an apology the day after, citing that their episode was in contempt of court according to the Attorney-General's Chambers (AGC). AGC issued warning letters to both Singh and Mediacorp on 19 December.

== Awards and accolades ==
Year	Award-giving body	Category	Recipient	Result	Ref.
2008	13th Asian Television Awards	Asia's Terrestrial Broadcaster of the Year	Mediacorp	Won	
2013	18th Asian Television Awards	Asia's Terrestrial Broadcaster of the Year	Mediacorp	Won	

== See also ==
- Mass media of Singapore
- Censorship in Singapore
- List of programmes broadcast by Mediacorp 5
- List of programmes broadcast by Mediacorp 8
- List of programs broadcast by MediaCorp Vasantham
- List of programmes broadcast by CNA
- Category:Singapore Chinese dramas
