= City TV (Singapore) =

- Country: Singapore
- Broadcast area: Singapore; Johor Bahru/Johor Bahru District (Malaysia); Batam/Batam Islands, Riau Islands (Indonesia) (overspill)
- Headquarters: Caldecott Hill

Programming
- Languages: English; Mandarin (from 2001)
- Picture format: 576i (4:3 SDTV)

Ownership
- Owner: MediaCorp
- Sister channels: Channel 5 Channel 8 Suria; Central; Channel NewsAsia

History
- Launched: 30 January 2000; 26 years ago
- Closed: 11 January 2002; 24 years ago
- Former names: Sportscity (2000 – 2001)

Availability (at time of closure)

Terrestrial
- Analog terrestrial television: Channel 38

City TV (Chinese: 都市台, literally "Urban Channel") was a free-to-air terrestrial television channel in Singapore, owned by state media conglomerate MediaCorp.

The channel was originally launched by the Television Corporation of Singapore (TCS) on 30 January 2000 as Sportscity, which initially focused on regional and international sports. In May 2001, amid low viewership, MediaCorp relaunched the channel as City TV, which primarily featured Chinese-language entertainment programming in daytime and prime time on weekdays, relegating sports programming to late-night hours and weekends. On 11 January 2002, City TV was shut down, with MediaCorp citing low advertising revenue.

== History ==
When Singapore International Media was restructured in July 1999 and renamed MediaCorp, TCS would create an all-new sports channel under its jurisdiction. Initially unnamed, the channel had a tentative launch date for April 2000. Under this arrangement, all of the sports programmes shown on Singapore Television Twelve's channels would move to the new channel. TCS eventually announced the launch of a new UHF sports channel, Sportscity, in late October 1999. By early January 2000, TCS had secured the rights to UEFA Euro 2000 and the 2000 Summer Olympics, and was bidding against SCV for the rights to Mike Tyson's fight against Julius Francis. On 13 January 2000, TCS announced that Sportscity would launch on 30 January, coinciding with its broadcast of the NFL's Super Bowl XXXIV.

The channel concentrated on six key sports: football, basketball, tennis, rugby, golf, and badminton. Its focus on local sports gave the channel the idea of being "Singapore's very own sports channel". Accompanying the predominantly international sporting events was Sports Night, a nightly sports bulletin. Sportscity would provide sports coverage with a "local flavour", giving emphasis t local events, including two S. League matches per week. Aligned with the government's long-term plans for the development of sports in Singapore, Sportscity was the only free-to-air sports channel in Southeast Asia. The channel was accompanied by a "content-driven" website.

Despite the blaze of publicity at launch, there were still viewers who encountered static and other reception difficulties. By 2001, the channel began to face competition for sports rights from SPH MediaWorks' new channel TVWorks, with key acquisitions such as English Premier League football highlights and rights to Manchester United's tour of Singapore.

=== City TV ===
On 4 May 2001, Mediacorp announced that Sportscity would be relaunched as City TV (unrelated to the Canadian network); the channel would be repositioned towards a cosmopolitan audience of "trendy adults". While approximately 60% of its schedule would remain devoted to sports programming, the remainder would now be occupied by Chinese-language programming as a complement to Channel 8. More than 80% of the Chinese-language programming was first-run, with Taiwanese variety shows, Korean and Japanese dramas, and entertainment news programmes. Some old dramas and movies were to be rerun, but on a "selective" basis.

The relaunch took effect on 14 May; Chinese programming was scheduled on weekdays from 3 p.m. to 10:30 p.m., divided into blocks such as City Entertainment (lifestyle and variety), City Nights (dramas, primetime Mondays to Thursdays) and City Movie (Friday primetime). City TV Sports ran from 10:30 p.m. to 1:30 a.m. on weekdays, and on weekends from 10:30 a.m. to sign-off. If necessary, some of the Chinese slots would be pre-empted for live sports. Among the programmes scheduled for the Chinese slots was the Taiwanese variety show Taiwan No. 1, which was banned in Taiwan due to sabotage to the actors. Most sports news programmes were to be axed in favour of more live programming due to low viewership, while Sports Night moved to 10:30 p.m. at the start of the weeknight sports block, and Channel 5's News 5 Tonight provided a three-minute news bulletin. A Mandarin-language sports bulletin was also provided.

The new format of the channel was seen with backlash from sports fans, whose primary concern was the mass replacement of sporting events by entertainment programming, which MediaCorp reiterated that it was a "minimal" cut. Moreover, its broadcast of WWF wrestling sparked outcry from the Singapore Broadcasting Authority, citing concerns that its broadcasts would have a negative impact on violence among children.

=== Shutdown ===
On 9 January 2002, Mediacorp announced that City TV would shut down after 11 January. Its sports output moved to Channel 5 and Channel NewsAsia, and all of its Chinese-language programming moved to Channel 8. Although the channel attracted a larger viewer base as City TV than as Sportscity, its ad revenue didn't increase in tandem.

The shutdown of City TV led to a content vacuum within Mediacorp's sports coverage, with viewers demanding other Mediacorp TV channels to air some of the events that were left without a channel. A report by the Infocomm Development Authority's Programme Advisory Committee lauded the channel's coverage of the 2001 SEA Games and its docuseries Dreams: The Team Singapore Story, but showed concerns that the channel's closedown had made it more difficult to locate sports programming on local television.

== Coverage ==
The channel was carried terrestrially on UHF channel 38, in households that already had a UHF tuner capable of receiving Premiere 12/Central and Channel NewsAsia. On Singapore CableVision, it was carried on channel 7 in the free tier.

== Programming ==
=== Original programming ===
- Sports Night
- Dreams: The Team Singapore Story
- SportsCity Personality of the Year Award (only edition held 20 April 2001)

=== Sporting events City TV had the rights to throughout its existence ===
- Super Bowl XXXIV
- 2000 Australian Open

== See also ==
- Channel U (Singaporean TV channel)
- Channel i (Singaporean TV channel)
- Okto
- TVMobile
- Mediacorp
