= TV Land (musical) =

2001 Singaporean musical

- The Musical
- Music: Dick Lee
- Productions: 2001 (launch of TVWorks)

TV Land, officially known as TV Land: The Musical is a Singaporean musical directed and composed by Dick Lee, who had also been appointed as SPH MediaWorks' creative director. The musical was the central point of the opening night of Channel i on 20 May 2001; it was staged at the Singapore Expo and also served as a preview of the channel's launch slate of programming. It featured four core characters, three of which were the presenters of The Big Buffet, which was set to be the channel's core programme, and the lead actress from Ah Girl.

The musical cost S$1.3 million, had an attendance of 2,500 guests and took three weeks to prepare, but its television ratings were very low.

== Synopsis ==
Four Singaporeans, Siti, Carrie, Maggie and Keanu, want to get on TV, by gatecrashing the launch party of a new TV channel. Thanks to their persistence and hard work, their dreams come true.

== Development ==
On 14 November 2000, Lee resigned from his post at Sony Music in Hong Kong and joined SPH MediaWorks; he would join the company from February 2001. He was tasked to compose theme songs for the channel's local series (Paradise and Ah Girl), but also planned a musical.

On 27 April 2001, MediaWorks announced that it would set up the TV Land roadshow at Suntec City on 29 April to raise awareness of the new channels, which would feature a preview of its launch programmes. At this time, the eponymous musical, planned for 20 May, was already announced, and was set to be held at the Singapore Expo. Moreover, as of 30 April, it was announced that Emma Bunton, formerly of the Spice Girls and now in her solo career, would take part in the musical. The total budget was SG$1 million, compared to SG$3 million for Channel U's Mega Launch Show on 6 May. Dick Lee would also sing two songs made specifically for the musical.

Rehearsals began on 15 May. Dick Lee believed that the musical would be Singapore's "equivalent of Hollywood" The final rehearsal was held on 19 May.

=== Casting ===
Most of the talent was local, centred on four characters (played by Karen Tan, Cynthia Lee, Imran Johri, Norleena Salim) with cameos from Kumar, Pam Oei and Lim Kay Siu. Cameos from Adrian Pang, Nadya Hutagalung, Lum May Yee, Junita Simon and Wendy Jacobs, who were already working at the channel, were also present, as well as songs from Singaporean celebrities, Tanya Chua, Mavis Hee, Iskandar Ismail, Anna Belle Francis and Amelia Samuels. The foreign guests were Emma Bunton and Latin American band MDO.

== Cast ==
Main cast

- Siti (Norleena Salim) is a married housewive with a son. Her dream is to become a singing diva upon her marriage, but then discovers her real talent. Norleena was the host of The Big Buffets Talentime derivative The Big Break.
- Carrie (Karen Tan) is a TV producer. Her job is to handle possible mishaps in the production, as well as the appearance of wannabe celebrities out of nowhere. Her biggest worry is the finale, where it could probably go wrong. Karen was one of the main hosts of The Big Buffet.
- Maggie (Cynthia Lee), also known as Ah Girl or Ah Lian, is a young woman who often speaks in Singlish. She wants to dance on the stage and even give a new meaning to the idiom "break a leg". Cynthia was the lead character in the channel's launch sitcom Ah Girl.
- Keanu (Imran Johri) is a filmmaker who wants to enter television production. He ends up knocking the actor meant to play the role of James Bond and gets his role. He appeared on game segments on The Big Buffet on Mondays and Tuesdays, as well as hosting the main show on Wednesdays, as well as producing segments such as Special Singaporeans.

== Songs ==
- Tonight's the Night (opening song, written by Dick Lee)
- Modern Girl (theme song to Ah Girl)
- Dream (Chinese ballad, Dick Lee, Mavis Lee and Tanya Chua)
- What a Guy Wants (cover of Christina Aguilera's What a Girl Wants by John Molina)
- You Should Know by Now (Sheila Majid with a string quartet)
- What Took You So Long? (international guest Emma Bunton)
- Just a Little Peace of Heaven (international guest band MDO)
- Changes (song from Dick Lee's 1997 musical Hot Pants, here performed by Norleena Salim)
- James Bond segment with Imran Johri
- Numbers from the 1998 Singaporean film Forever Fever with Adrian Pang, Annabelle Francis, Sebastian Tan and Tirso Garcia
- TV Land (closing song performed by the entire cast)

== Broadcast ==
TV Land was broadcast from 8:30pm to 10:30pm with a prologue featuring the profiles of the main characters prior to the 9pm show. The musical was livestreamed on its website with the addition of facts related to the stars, such as biography, which were not present on the TV broadcast.

TV Land bombed in ratings behind Channel 5: the channel programmed an episode of Phua Chu Kang Pte Ltd before the musical and an all-star special of Who Wants to Be a Millionaire? during it, whereas the musical itself only had 1.6% share. Its share was lower than that of the TVWorks premiere of Godzilla that came before it, with a 4.7% share.

== Reception ==
The New Paper described the musical as being "full of musical lessons", largely extoling the musical guests and less about the four main characters. Project Eyeball considered the plotline to be "a tad confusing", with enjoyable acting but "meaty enough" musical numbers.

Mediacorp's Today panned Johari's "no-synch lip-synch", Molina's What a Man Wants and Caleb Goh trying to include himself on a category of gorgeous young men.
