= Channel i News =

2001–2004 Singaporean TV news programme

- Genre: Flagship News
- Starring: Paul Jansen; Arnold Gay; Michelle Quah
- Country of origin: Singapore
- Original language: English

Production
- Camera setup: Multi-camera
- Running time: 30 minutes
- Production company: SPH MediaWorks

Original release
- Network: Channel i
- Release: 21 May 2001 – 31 December 2004

Channel i News (formerly TVWorks News and Straits Times TV News) was a Singaporean daily evening news bulletin broadcast on Channel i from its inception until its closure. It employed synergies from Singapore Press Holdings' print publications, most notably The Straits Times, which used its name until 2003.

== History ==
SPH MediaWorks received its first contracts for news in July 2000, when Jennifer Lewis was appointed the head of its TV News Unit. In late August, it was reported that Lim Chung Bee of the Chinese team (responsible for what would become Channel U) was set to visit the offices of CNN and the BBC for preliminary training. A news studio was being built at Times House in Kim Seng Road. On 1 December 2000, Arnold Gay and Michelle Quah, formerly of Channel NewsAsia, joined. Gay noticed the opportunity as a "dream come true" owing to its integration with the print and online units of the conglomerate and was expecting synergy from it.

The first TVWorks News bulletins aired on 21 May 2001, the channel's second day on air (its first day had a special schedule). TVWorks broadcast two news bulletins that day, first at 7:30pm and then at 10:30pm. (Note: TVWorks News at 7:30 was listed as The Evening News and TVWorks News at 10:30 was listed as The Nightly News in TV listings, respectively.) The 7:30pm bulletin was presented by Michelle Quah, and the 10:30pm bulletin by Paul Jansen. Although the first edition of TVWorks News was plagued by minor technical issues, the bulletin was known for its novel ideas, such as ending the bulletins with live jazz performances by the Singapore Stompers. Unlike its competitor News 5 Tonight, TVWorks News was aimed more at local news.

On 13 June 2001, the channel's news operation angered the Filipino community with controversial remarks from Michelle Quah telling viewers that the Abu Sayyaf hostages were "fortunately not American." This led to accusations of portrayals of Filipinos as maids or prostitutes. Quah apologised on the following evening's newscast, after news of the incident reached news wires. As of early July, both of its bulletins were not rating well, raking in an average 10,600 viewers, as the audience preferred CNA and foreign news channels instead. By mid-July, ratings fell to 7,000 viewers for both bulletins. Yvonne Kwok in her TV column at Streats on 17 July even questioned the need for two bulletins on the channel.

On 3 September 2001, the same day TVWorks introduced a new schedule in order to recoup losses from the initial format, the news moved to 9:30pm (the same time as News 5 Tonight) and adopted a two-anchor format (still using the single-anchor format for weekend bulletins), presented by Arnold Gay and Michelle Quah; the former returned to SPH. The new format favoured scoops from SPH newspapers over wire reports; scoops were rarely seen on Singaporean TV news at the time.

In order to increase its identity and ratings, SPH MediaWorks announced on 12 May 2003 that it would rebrand Straits Times TV News as Channel i News effective 19 May 2003. The new look was heavily visual in nature. A few months later, in July, its journalist Deborah Ng gave the story of the surgical operation of Iranian twins Laleh and Ladan Bijani to US network CNN. In order to clear more time for entertainment programming, the bulletin moved to 8:30pm on 3 November 2003. On 4 December 2003, Channel i News was awarded "Best News Programme" at the 2003 Asian Television Awards. The award was given mainly because of its 2003 refresh.

The final edition of Channel i News aired on 31 December 2004 at the usual time and was repeated at 1am, effectively becoming the last programme seen on the channel. The final segment consisted of a brief retrospective of the channel's news and current affairs programming, followed by a farewell message from the channel's news team.
