= Lose a Million =

1993 British game show

- Created by: Andrew O'Connor, Toby Freeman, Stephen Leahy
- Presented by: Chris Tarrant
- Voices of: Honor Blackman
- Theme music composer: Simon Etchell
- Country of origin: United Kingdom
- Original language: English
- No. of series: 1
- No. of episodes: 15

Production
- Executive producers: Andrew O'Connor, Stephen Leahy
- Running time: 30 minutes
- Production company: Action Time for Carlton Television

Original release
- Network: ITV
- Release: 22 September – 29 December 1993

Lose a Million is an early 1990s British game show which was produced by Action Time for Carlton Television and was hosted by Chris Tarrant. The show featured voiceovers by Honor Blackman.

In a twist to the traditional gameshow format, the contestants each started with a group of pretend prizes worth a total of £1 million and attempted to lose as many of them as possible by answering questions incorrectly. The contestant with the lowest total prize value after three rounds was declared the winner and received the opportunity to play for £5,000.

The set of the show resembled an Art Deco cruise ship.

== Format ==
Three contestants competed through three rounds of play. At the beginning of the game, they were each "given" five extravagant prizes whose retail value totaled £1 million; however, one of them actually had little or no value. The value of a prize was not revealed until it was first chosen to be removed from a contestant's inventory.

In the first round, each contestant had to give incorrect answers to as many questions as possible within a time limit. They were encouraged to be humorous in their responses, which had to be somehow related to the question in order to count toward their score. Examples:

- "What does a postman do?" – "Shins up drainpipes."
- "Point to a clever contestant." (Contestant points to herself)
- "What sort of vehicle was the Yellow Submarine?" – "A double-decker bus."

The contestant who gave the most incorrect answers could discard one prize; any ties were broken in favour of the contestant who had given their answers in the shortest total time.

For the second round, each contestant was asked a series of 10 questions, the first of which always asked them to state their name. They had to refrain from answering this one, then respond to each of the others with the correct answer for the question before it. Questions were written for comic effect with the mismatched answers. The contestant who gave the most correct answers could discard one prize. If contestants tied, each could discard a prize.

During the third round, the host made two passes through the field, asking one question to each contestant per pass. Questions in this round had two answer choices and had to be answered incorrectly. A contestant who missed a question could pass one prize to an opponent, while a correct answer allowed both opponents to pass a prize to the contestant who gave it. The contestant with the lowest total at the end of this round became the day's champion.

In the final round, the champion was asked a question with six answer choices, five of which were incorrect. The champion had to eliminate one of these answers at a time by placing a £200,000 bundle of prop money on a carriage at one end of a track corresponding to that answer. The host then pressed a button to set the carriage in motion; if the answer was indeed incorrect, the cash disappeared in a burst of pyrotechnics at the other end of the track. If the champion successfully eliminated all five incorrect answers in this manner, they won £5,000. Choosing the correct answer at any time ended the round and awarded the champion a worthless joke prize.

== International versions ==
In Singapore, a similar version called Here's A Million, was aired on SPH MediaWorks channel TV Works in 2001.

This version debuted in Indonesia called Tantangan 1 Milyar (The Billion Rupiah Challenge), was aired on SCTV in 1997. It was hosted by Jody Sumantri.

An adaptation was broadcast in Germany called Verlieren Sie Millionen (Lose Millions) aired on second public-broadcaster ZDF in 1995. While still an active player, football manager Jürgen Klopp took part in the show.

In Catalonia and the Land of Valencia it was called Ruïna Total, and Gezurra nagusi in the Basque Country.

In the United States, it was piloted in 1995 and was hosted by Bruce Gold.

A Ukrainian adaptation called Програй мільйон was aired from 2003 to 2006 on ICTV and was hosted by Maxim Nelipa.

Country	Name	Host	Network	Date premiered
Germany	Verlieren Sie Millionen	Mike Krüger	ZDF	10 February – 17 June 1995
Indonesia	Tantangan 1 Milyar	Jody Sumantri	SCTV	1997
Singapore	Here's A Million	Hamish Brown	TV Works	21 May – 20 August 2001
Spain (Catalonia and Land of Valencia)	Ruïna Total	Emilià Carrilla (TV3); Ximo Rovira (Canal 9)	TV3 (Catalonia); Canal 9 (Land of Valencia)	1992
Spain (Basque Country)	Gezurra nagusi	José Felipe Auzmendi	ETB 1	1992
Turkey	Kaybet-Kazan	Ferhan Şensoy	ATV	1993
Ukraine	Програй мільйон Progray milyon	Maxim Nelipa	ICTV	2003–2006
