= Ah Girl =

- Genre: Sitcom
- Created by: Andrea Teo
- Starring: Cynthia Lee; Irene Ang; Pierre Png; Edwin Chong; Tan Kheng Hua; Marcus Ng Yi Loong; Neo Swee Lin; Charlie Tan; Ray Kuan; Lim Kay Siu
- Countries of origin: Singapore; Malaysia
- Original language: English
- No. of seasons: 3

Production
- Executive producer: Colin Cairnes
- Producer: Ong Su Mann
- Running time: 22–23 minutes
- Production company: SPH MediaWorks

Original release
- Network: Channel i (Singapore); TV3 (Malaysia)
- Release: 10 July 2001 – 2003

Ah Girl is a Singaporean sitcom that originally aired on Channel i from 2001 to 2003, starring Cynthia Lee as Maggie, an ah lian that opened a mobile phone shop. It ran for three seasons.

It was SPH MediaWorks' plan to compete against established local sitcoms on Channel 5, premiering in the same timeslot as Phua Chu Kang Pte Ltd. As part of a plan to produce sitcoms in other countries, it was shot in Malaysia and was co-produced with TV3, and was shot in Kuala Lumpur.

== Plot ==
Maggie is an ah lian sales girl who works at a neighbourhood mobile phone shop (Call Me Phone Shop) in an industrial region thirty minutes by car from Kuala Lumpur. She dreams of going to Singapore, having a "flashy mobile phone", "three-and-a-half inch platform shoes" and a typical ah lian wardrobe.

In season 2, Maggie got a suspected case of breast cancer.

== Cast ==
- Cynthia Lee as Maggie. Age 21 (though acting like she's 15), she dreams of being an ah lian.
- Silvester Lao as Maggie's father
- Ary Malik as Neena, Maggie's best friend
- Adrian Lim as Maggie's boyfriend
- Nora Samosir as Mrs. Fernandez, Maggie's boss
- Adrian Pang as Russell Koh, introduced in season 2

== Episodes ==
=== Season 1 ===
Partial list:

- 10 July 2001: Maggie dreams of going out on Saturday for her 21st birthday, but her boss Mrs. Fernandez is against it.
- 17 July 2001: Maggie's father gives her a present to Mrs. Fernandez; Peggy believes her boss is sexually harassing Maggie.
- 31 July 2001: Maggie's 49th boyfriend will be her last. Her new work uniform does not match her aspirations. Her father tries ordering flowers for Mrs. Fernandez by phone, without using a credit card.
- 7 August 2001: Call Me Phone Shop is about to go regional. As it turns out, Neena's uncle is one of the prospective investors, and Maggie has to work with him. Her father starts a secret friendship with Kelvin.
- 28 August 2001: Peggy's Lim Emergency Fund goes missing.
- 4 September 2001: Neena is put in charge of the phone shop while Peggy becomes grumpier.
- 11 September 2001: A love triangle is formed between Maggie and Rainbow (Peggy's yoga instructor), the latter of which catches Mrs. Fernandez's attention.
- 18 September 2001: Maggie, Neena and Peggy are involved in a blind date, except that they're all dating the same guy. Mrs. Fernandez makes Maggie's father do the cha-cha, which he doesn't like.
- 25 September 2001: Maggie enters a beauty pageant and Neena falsifies her family data in the application form.
- 9 October 2001: Maggie does not like Kelvin. Peggy is obsessed over a promotion. Daddy takes part in an act to save Mrs. Fernandez, risking his life (and a few limbs) for that.

=== Season 2 ===
Partial list:

- 26 March 2002: Russell Koh becomes the new boss and May Chiu is now Maggie's new colleague. Peggy attempts imposing cost-cutting measures.
- 9 April 2002: Kelvin is envious of Russell's proximity to Maggie, while she finds out that May is competing against Mrs. Fernandez for the top spot at the workplace.
- 23 April 2002: Peggy entrusts Russell to track down a criminal, while Maggie and May fall prey to a conman. Mrs. Fernandez's Jaguar breaks down.
- 7 May 2002: Peggy shows signs of stress while Russell comes up with a solution against it, but this deteriorates her situation.
- 21 June 2002: Peggy helps Russell in his new job as a Tupperware salesman.

== Production ==
The idea was conceived by Ong Su Mann, formerly one of the Phua Chu Kang Pte Ltd production staffs, while on a plane to Paris in October 2000, where he came up with a sitcom about an ah girl owning a mobile phone shop.

SPH MediaWorks announced the series when it revealed TV Works' launch programmes in January 2001. Ong Su Mann was its producer. On 16 January, Cynthia Lee was appointed as the lead actress. Moreover, the series would be filmed in Malaysia and TV3 would co-produce the series and was also held the broadcasting rights in Malaysia. Lee also took part in prelaunch promotional events, namely the 2001 Chingay carnival in February, the TV Land roadshow event one week ahead of launch and the subsequent musical on opening night.

The series premiered on 10 July 2001 at 9:30pm, competing against the new season of Phua Chu Kang, which began on Channel 5 an hour earlier. Channel vice president Andrea Teo was not worried with the airtime, as the series also chose a local archetype, in this case, the ah lian. The series had StarHub product placement; all mobile phones carrying the carrier's name were sent to Customs 24 hours before the first shooting day began. It took six months to find an actor for Maggie's father, which ended up being Silvester Lao. The series was also used to fill in the gaps caused by the end of The Big Buffet, which cut its length in early June.

With a new schedule in September, TVWorks moved it to the same time as Mr. Kiasu. By the end of the month, MediaWorks' internal rating system was recording only 50,000 viewers.

Season 2 was marked by the introduction of the family's new tenant, Russel Koh. Season 3 began in late 2002.
