= Jill Lim =

Singaporean radio presenter

- Born: 1990 (age 35–36); Singapore
- Education: Republic Polytechnic
- Occupation: Radio DJ

Jillian Kimberley Lim (born 1990) was a former radio presenter from Singapore on Kiss 92FM and One FM 91.3, and most recently on MONEY FM 98.3 from 2023 to 2024.

== Biography ==
Lim is of mixed ethnicity, with Eurasian and Chinese ancestry.

In 2009, while studying at Republic Polytechnic, Lim joined Hot FM 91.3's morning show, 'The Married Men', alongside DJs Rod Monteiro and Andre Hoeden. When 'The Married Men' show ended in 2013, Jill continued as a DJ at Hot FM (which was renamed One FM 91.3 in 2015), presenting her own shows and also co-presenting the evening show with Joshua Simon from 2015 to 2016.

In 2017, Lim moved to One FM's sister station, Kiss 92FM.
