= Joshua Simon =

Joshua Simon may refer to:

- Joshua Simon (American football) (born 2000), American football player
- Joshua Simon (radio presenter) (born 1990), Singaporean radio presenter
- Joshua Simon (writer) (born 1979), Israeli writer and critic
