= Here's a Million =

Singaporean game show

Here's a Million was a gameshow that was aired from May 21 to August 20, 2001 over the defunct SPH MediaWorks's English channel TVWorks, the predecessor of Channel i. It was similar to the British gameshow Lose a Million. The host was Hamish Brown and lasted for 65 episodes.

Commissioned in January 2001, it was announced precisely when Channel 5 was launching the local edition of Who Wants to Be a Millionaire, which started in April.

The aim of the gameshow, is to "dispose" off as many of the five make-believe items totalling a value of $1 million that each of the three contestants is allocated at the start of the programme, and the contestant that has the least value worth of items at the end of the show wins the game and gets to play a bonus round where $1000 can be won. The value of the items shown is not revealed until a particular contestant picks it and "disposes" it.

The game comprises three rounds and a bonus round.

== Round 1 ==
In the first round, three contestants would be asked ten questions each and the contestant will get a point each if they answered the question wrongly. The contestant(s) who got the most number of questions correctly can remove one item of their list.

== Round 2 ==
In the second round, contestants have to answer the previous question. For example, when they were asked question 3, they would have given the correct answer for question 2. However, contestants have to say "don't know" or remain silent for question 1 to gain the point. There are ten questions to answer. Similarly to round 1, the contestant(s) who got the most number of questions correctly can remove one item of their list.

== Round 3 ==
In the third round, each contestant will have to answer two questions each in a round-robin format. Each of the questions will have two options, one right and one wrong. Contestants will have to pick the wrong answer so as to throw one of their items to their opponents. If they pick the correct answer, the other two contestants will be able to pick one item for their set to throw to the contestant.

== Bonus Round ==
The contestant will get a question with six options and will place five gold bars on the five wrong options one by one, leaving the correct option to win $1000. The contestant leaves with a consolation prize by placing the gold bar on the correct option. For the last five episodes, contestants could win a trip for two on Star Cruises.

== Production ==
The gameshow was produced by Cream Media and filming was done in a studio at Lorong 23 Geylang.
