= Paradise (2001 TV series) =

2001 Singaporean action drama series

- Starring: Nadya Hutagalung; Lum May Yee
- Country of origin: Singapore
- Original language: English
- No. of episodes: 8

Original release
- Network: TVWorks
- Release: 5 July – 30 August 2001

Paradise is a Singaporean action drama series commissioned for TVWorks in 2001, produced in association with Stages Productions. Shot on location in the Philippines, it was set to last thirteen episodes, but ended after only eight episodes due to low ratings.

== Plot ==
Jasmine Wu (Nadya Hutagalung) is a Singaporean model who recently moved to the fictional island of Paraiso (Tagalog for Paradise, the series' name) in the Philippines for work. There, she meets Anna (Lum May Yee), the owner of a resort on the island. Jasmine's plans change in favour of other activities such as horse-riding and kayaking. Unbeknownst to the two, the island is also beset with crime. There, they meet two inhabitants, Aldrin (Rustom Padilla) and Ramon (Romnick Sarmenta).

== Production ==
Paradise was first announced on 20 March 2001. The series was shot on location in the Philippines, much like Ah Girl in Kuala Lumpur, as an attempt to diversity MediaWorks' production capacities. Filming for the pilot began in late April and would begin for the rest of the series in June. At the TV Land carnival on 29 April, the two lead actresses took part and were cheered by the audience.

The theme song (composed by Dick Lee) was sung by newcomer Amelia Samuels and was previewed in the TV Land musical on 20 May. Filming took place at the Elizalde Beach Resort in Calatangan, Batangas, southwest of Manila. It was the first English-language drama produced by both Singapore and the Philippines; negotiations to sell the series to the United States were mooted. The set worked in an awful condition given some factors such as weather and humidity; the set's bathroom changed its tiles daily; there was also a makeshift canteen which received "swarms of houseflies" during mealtime. Actresses sometimes had to stock up food. Filming took a one-week break at premiere time, with eight weeks left, however, some tension emerged between the leads.

Reports emerged at the end of July that Lum May Yee was set to leave Paradise, which she denied.

In August, TVWorks decided to end all filming of Paradise as a cost-cutting measure. A channel spokesman said that eight of the initial batch of thirteen episodes were filmed and there were no plans to film and air the remaining five. No decision to restart the series was announced for the time being. Moreover, the key factors were the erratic weather in Batangas Province ruining filming, as well as problems with the cast and crew. The last episode aired on 30 August.

== Broadcast ==
On 28 June 2001, The Making of Paradise aired in anticipation for its premiere.

The first episode aired on 5 July and aired on Thursday nights. The first episode was the most seen for the channel that evening.

== Reactions ==
Viewer reactions to the first episode were mostly negative. The Straits Times conducted a survey through its lifestyle supplement Life! and gathered reactions from ten viewers. While viewers praised the cinematography, they criticised the script.
