= One FM 91.3 =

- Singapore
- Frequency: 91.3 MHz

Programming
- Format: Classic hits, adult contemporary

Ownership
- Owner: SPH Media Trust
- Sister stations: MONEY FM 89.3; Kiss92 FM; 96.3 Hao FM; UFM100.3

History
- First air date: 2 March 1991; 35 years ago
- Former names: NTUC Heart Radio 91.3 (1991–2001); WKRZ 91.3 (2001–2006); Radio 91.3 (2006–2012); Hot FM 91.3 (2012–2015)

Links
- Website: onefm.sg

ONE FM 91.3 (formerly known as HOT FM 91.3 before 19 January 2015, Radio 91.3 before 1 August 2012, and WKRZ 91.3 before 14 July 2006) is an English-language radio station based in Singapore. This radio station is owned by SPH Media Trust. ONE FM 91.3 is an English music station playing hits from the 80s to now.

== History ==
The National Trades Union Congress began plans to start radio stations in April 1990, with the launch set for early 1991. Known as NTUC Radio at the time, it broadcast on 91.3 MHz in English and 100.3 MHz in Mandarin, with 10% of the time set aside for Malay and Tamil programmes on the two stations respectively. Both stations were the first "wireless" private radio stations in Singapore. Being not profit-driven, the radio stations would have a "social purpose" besides providing entertainment. It planned to compete with SBC and the two radio stations from Batam. NTUC would later adopt the name Radio Heart in January 1991, which was also the name of its sponsored radio programme, "Voice from the Heart", which aired on SBC.

Radio Heart began trial transmissions on 28 January 1991 and launched on 2 March by the then secretary-general of NTUC, Ong Teng Cheong. His brief speech at 10:45 am was followed by NTUC's theme song, "Voices from the Heart", requested by Ong himself to the NTUC members.

Radio Heart was operated by NTUC Voice Cooperative Society Limited, which also owned "other communication and publication ventures", with studios located at the basement of the Singapore Labour Foundation building at Thomson Road. It operated with an initial budget of $10 million. In its early weeks, the station carried Radio Kiasu, a programme in Singlish.

By mid-1991, the English service Heart 91.3 had 9,000 listeners in the one-hour period between 12 pm and 1 pm.

On 15 July 1991, transmissions of Radio Heart's 91.3 and 100.3 were suspended for 32 hours due to problems with the transmitter at the SLF building in Thomson Road. Both stations resumed broadcasting on 17 July on low power.

In October 1992, Heart 91.3 revamped its programming to shed its "teeny-bopper" image and to appeal to a wider audience, with each programme having a specific theme and play a wide range of music from reggae to country. The changes were not related to the competition with SBC as their target audience was different. By 1992, Heart 91.3 had an average daily listenership of 61,000, or three percent of adults, lower than the Class 95 and Perfect 10.

The Straits Times in 1993 described Radio Heart's programming which include lifestyle, fitness and health, current affairs, education and entertainment.

In July 1993, Radio Heart opened a satellite studio – a "branch" of the main studio – at the Takashimaya complex of Ngee Ann City in Orchard Road, operating from 12 pm to 8 pm. Over four hours of live programming came from the studio, with 91.3 from 12 to 2 pm and 100.3 from 6 to 8 pm.

As part of National Day celebrations in August 1993, 91.3 aired Lion City Heartbeat, airing only Singaporean music throughout its broadcast day, divided into easy listening, blues and alternative. The station collaborated with local magazine BigO for sourcing older music materials and relevant information. The broadcast continued the following year, lasting for 21 hours.

Heart 91.3 began 24 hour broadcasting on 1 May 1994. Roland Tan, general manager of NTUC Radio, said that the stations' overnight presenters made the station different to other radio stations. The response was positive, with callers coming in at 2 am, mostly students in higher education institutes who wanted to relax after studying for their exams.

On 3 September 1995, Heart 91.3 relaunched as a station playing adult contemporary songs targeting listeners between ages of 25 and 45 to avoid the misconception that the station is for the younger listeners.

In October 1995, NTUC members proposed that Radio Heart use Standard Malay in its programmes; however this had already been implemented. The members also proposed that Radio Heart air Malay programmes earlier in the day for the convenience of listeners. By 1997, Heart 91.3 had an extensive playlist, ranging from "pop to alternative to classical" and multilingual programmes that featured English, Japanese, Thai and Chinese-dialect music.

MediaWorks intended to buy radio stations from NTUC in March 2001, with the creation of a joint-venture between the two, taking over 91.3 and 100.3, now known as Most Music and Heart FM respectively. The tentative name of the new company was UnionWorks and the relaunch was initially set for the end of May.

Ahead of the relaunch of More Music as WKRZ, SPH MediaWorks announced that it would carry at least 22 hours of syndicated MTV content per week. On 3 October 2001, SPH Radio Broadcasting Arm, a joint management between SPH Multimedia and NTUC Media was launched as SPH UnionWorks. It owns, manages, and operates UFM 1003 and WKRZ 91.3FM. More Music was given a US-style name, going under the fake callsign WKRZ.

== Notable broadcasters ==
- Vernetta Lopez
- Arnold Gay
- Sheikh Haikel
- Maddy Barber
- Gerald Koh
- Roger Kool
- Daniel Ong
- Carol Smith
- Glenn Ong
- Jill Lim
- Joshua Simon

== Controversies ==
WKRZ 91.3 was probed for including explicit language in an edition of The Morning Show on 27 July 2003. The fine, worth $15,000, involved a woman simulating an orgasm. Sex scenes were, then as now, not allowed on Singaporean media, in an attempt to prevent tensions between ethnic groups.

In January 2013, popular DJs The Married Men were dropped due to content deemed inappropriate during a morning "Kena Pluck" segment during the Morning Drive Time show.

== See also ==
- Channel i (Singaporean TV channel)
- List of radio stations in Singapore
