= MediaWorks =

MediaWorks may refer to:

- MediaWorks New Zealand, runs many radio stations across New Zealand
- ASCII Media Works, a Japanese publishing house founded April 1, 2008
  - MediaWorks (publisher), a former Japanese publishing, which merged to form ASCII MediaWorks on April 1, 2008
- SPH MediaWorks, a broadcasting company based in Singapore that was merged into MediaCorp
