= Roger Kool =

Singaporean musician (1954–2005)

- Born: Roger Kiew; 1954; Singapore
- Died: 31 October 2005 (aged 50–51); Vancouver, Canada

Roger Kiew, who goes by his celebrity moniker Roger Kool was a Singaporean DJ who was well-known uniquely for being the first local blind celebrity. He was also remembered for his signature bells ringing sounds and the catchy Here's Roger Kool! at the start of his radio shows in the 1980s.

== Biography ==
Born to a poor family in 1954, Kiew became blind due to eye cancer when he was five years old.

He first joined the cable radio station Rediffusion and as a result of his unique presentations he grew to become a popular DJ in the 1970s and 1980s, especially with the Burger King-sponsored radio show Saturday Spin that he hosted from 1984 to 1986.

Despite having millions of fans across Singapore through his syndicate radio shows (one of which was his famous "Dial-A-Joke" programme), it did not stop there; the numbers grew with his start of sponsored radio shows for Coca-Cola, Kodak, Swensen's, Isetan, Sembawang Music Centre, Stamford Tires, as well as numerous college, polytechnic, and club appearances. Having met monumental stars such as Cliff Richard, Helen Reddy, Dionne Warwick, Stevie Wonder, Toni Braxton, and many more, he gained respect from critics everywhere despite his physical disabilities. He moved to Sri Lanka for a year, accepting a job there, and then continued on to work at NTUC Radio Heart 91.3 during the 1990s.

In 1998 he then started his own CD series, "Better English with Roger Kool", which has helped aid children in primary schools throughout Singapore learn how to speak better English. With that came a Multiplication CD, a CD aimed towards aiding kids to memorize their multiplication tables with catchy songs.

In July 1999, Roger and his wife Lynette held lunchtime roadshows twice a week at the National University of Singapore, Temasek Polytechnic and the Singapore Polytechnic for the entire month.

Kool died of bone cancer on 31 October 2005 in Vancouver, Canada leaving behind his wife, Lynette Loon, and two sons, Jay and Neil.
