= Gerald Koh =

Singaporean DJ

- 许国欢
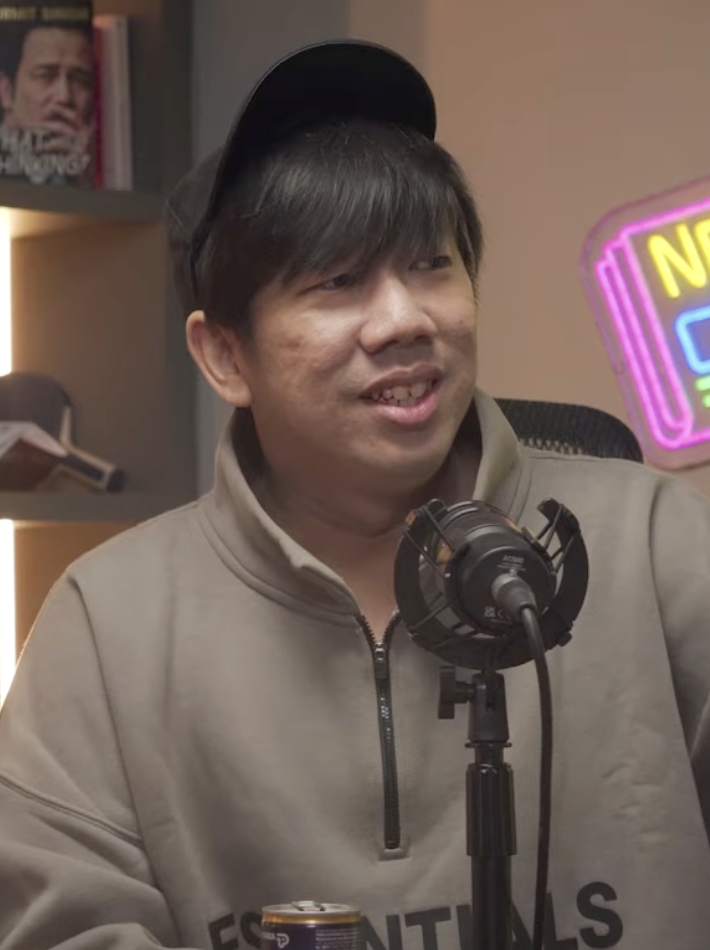
- Koh in 2025
- Born: 19 September 1984 (age 42)
- Education: Ngee Ann Polytechnic
- Spouse: Thia Zhi Xin
- Presenting career
- Show: The Breakfast Club with Sophie Gollifer and Pierre Png
- Station: Gold 905
- Time slot: 6-10AM

Gerald Koh (许国欢, born 19 September 1984), better known by his stage name Boy Thunder, is a Singaporean radio personality. He once worked as a radio host for Singapore-based music station Hot FM 91.3 and hosted the evening show Taking You Home with Adam Piperdy and Joshua Simon from 4 - 7.30pm. In June 2014, he joined rival station 987 and hosted the night show "Itchy Pyjamas" from 8pm to 12 midnight. In his tenure at 987, he hosted The Bro Code with Joakim Gomez, Hotdogs with Adam, Get Up with Kimberly Wang, and Get Out with Kimberly Wang and former host Maya Davidov. He is now hosting at Gold 905, currently hosting "The Breakfast Club" with Sophie Gollifer and guest host Pierre Png.

== Biography ==
Koh attended Catholic Junior College after graduating from St. Gabriel's Secondary School. He also attended Ngee Ann Polytechnic, where he studied Mass Communication.

In March 2013, Boy Thunder, alongside Adam Piperdy, presented the longest marathon show in Singapore radio history, which lasted for 77 hours and 11 minutes with no breaks in between. The duo also managed to achieve a Guinness World Record for the Longest Marathon for a Radio Music Show DJ – Team.

== Personal life ==
Koh married Thia Zhi Xin on 20 February 2016.
