= The Big Buffet =

- Genre: Variety show
- Starring: Karen Tan; Imran Johri; Adrian Pang; Norleena Salim
- Country of origin: Singapore
- Original language: English

Production
- Camera setup: Multi-camera
- Running time: 90 minutes (7:00pm to 8:30pm Singapore Time), later 60 minutes
- Production company: SPH MediaWorks

Original release
- Network: TVWorks
- Release: 21 May – 31 December 2001

The Big Buffet was a Singaporean daily variety show aired on TVWorks in the channel's early months. Airing live from Monday to Thursday, it was seen as the channel's flagship programme, and would emulate other formats that were successful in the past, such as the Talentime competitions from Mediacorp, as well as other segments. Low ratings led to its early downfall, causing it to lose thirty out of its initial ninety minutes, before being scrapped altogether.

== Production ==
The programme was first conceived as early as December 2000, when SPH MediaWorks' senior vice president Andrea Teo was outlining TVWorks' programming line, which would emphasise more on Singaporean productions and talent. She described it as "a seamless belt of entertainment programmes that will be modular and interactive": it would employ new technologies from the outset, enabling viewer interactivity from its website, on TV and on SPH's newspapers. One of the goals of the "big variety show" was to provide insights on Singaporean life without being "boring or didactic". In January 2001, the staff was working on a Talentime derivative with the aim of building "the next generation of stars". It was already defined that it would air four nights a week, Mondays to Thursdays. Other segments such as Budget Night and Stylo Mylo Night were already planned, and the presenter roster was also defined (Karen Tan, Imran Johri, Adrian Pang and Norleena Salim). There would also be games segments, movie reviews and the latest "happenings" in Singapore; the programme would be produced live from TVWorks' facilities at Far East Square.

Four more artistes were announced in February:

- Wendy Jacobs, hosting outdoor segments
- Serene Chen
- Sebastian Tan, network executives were expecting him to appear in its comedy segments
- Tirso Garcia

The timeslot (8 to 9:30pm) was defined in April. When SPH held its TV Land carnival, its presenters were involved in promotional activities. With less than two weeks before the programme's premiere, Adrian Pang was announced as its movie reviewer for the C Movie segment, in-character as Russell Koh, who was a pirate VCD seller.

== Release ==
Rehearsals were being made as early as 16 May.

The first edition was broadcast on 21 May 2001, TVWorks' second day on air. Attending the inaugural edition were guest stars Emma Bunton, who took part in the channel's inaugural musical the night before, Steadfast and the Moscow Circus. It attracted a 30% share, but was plagued by minor technical problems: But the programme still attracted some negative criticism from locals, as well as perceptions that the 1970s-looking set was "tacky", as well as an English version of variety shows from Taiwan and Japan, such as Super Sunday.

On 6 June 2001, TVWorks announced that, due to dwindling ratings, it would amp up its acquisitions and announced a cut in its length from ninety minutes to sixty. Consequently, the show moved to a new timeslot at 8:30pm instead of the usual 8pm, as one of the presenters said nobody was expected to be at home by 8. In August, TVWorks announced the cancellation of The Big Buffet. The final edition aired on 31 August; TVWorks began its new schedule on 3 September. With the September retool, it was renamed Jalan Jalan, airing on an hour-long slot on Tuesday nights.
