= Maddy Barber =

Singaporean radio presenter (born 1973)

- Born: Medalina Tan; 3 November 1973 (age 53); Singapore
- Education: Ngee Ann Polytechnic
- Occupations: Radio DJ; businesswoman; former actress; former property agent
- Spouse: Wez Barber (m. 2005)
- Children: 2
- Website: maddybarber.com

Medalina "Maddy" Barber (née Tan; born 3 November 1973) is a Singaporean radio presenter, businesswoman and former actress. She is Formerly the co-presenter of the breakfast show on Kiss 92FM together with Jason Johnson and Divian Nair, and was previously a presenter on Perfect Ten 98.7FM and Hot FM 91.3.

== Early life ==
Born on 3 November 1973, she was named "Medalina" after a Norwegian container ship belonging to the company her father worked for. Over the years, she has been known as "Medaline", "Madeline" and "Meddie", before settling on "Maddy". She attended school at CHIJ (Toa Payoh), Victoria Junior College and Ngee Ann Polytechnic in Singapore, and also studied for a period at Indooroopilly State High School in Brisbane, Australia.

== Career ==
Her first stint in radio was with Perfect Ten 98.7FM from 1995 to 1997, where she presented various shows including co-hosting the morning show for a period with John Klass.

She then moved into acting, appearing in the role of Ah Mei in the 1998 Singapore movie Forever Fever, directed by Glen Goei. Following this, she became a cast member in the Channel 5 drama series Spin from 1999 to 2000, playing the role of Sarah.

After her stint on TV, she moved overseas. She worked as a radio consultant in Mumbai, India, before moving to Bangkok, Thailand, where she served as Programme Director for Virgin Radio.

After a period working as a property agent, she returned to Singapore radio in 2009, helming the evening drive-time show, The Backseat, on Hot FM 91.3 on weekdays from 4.00 - 7.30 pm.

Since Kiss 92FM began broadcasting in August 2012, she has been the co-host of the station's breakfast show, Maddy, Jason and Arnold in the Mornings, from 6.00 - 10.00 am on weekdays together with Jason Johnson and Arnold Gay. She has also served as the station's Assistant Programme Director.

In addition to working in radio, she also has her own jewellery business, Madly Gems.

== Personal life ==
She met her husband, British IT consultant Wez Barber, while living in Thailand. She has a daughter from a previous relationship and a second daughter with Wez.
