= Arnold Gay =

Singaporean TV and radio presenter

- Born: 11 May 1967 (age 59); Singapore
- Education: National University of Singapore
- Occupations: Radio DJ; TV presenter
- Spouse: Deborah Chia
- Children: 1

Arnold Gay (born 11 May 1967) is a television presenter and former radio presenter from Singapore. He is currently presenting the breakfast show "Asia First" on CNA together with Julie Yoo, Teresa Tang, Yasmin Jonkers, Elizabeth Neo & Sarah Al-Khaldi from Jan 2024. He previously worked at Singapore radio stations Class 95FM, Power 98 FM, Kiss 92FM, as well as sister channel CNA938. He was also a broadcast journalist at various TV stations including CNA, CNBC Asia, Bloomberg TV and Reuters TV.

== Education ==
Gay was educated at Catholic High School, St Joseph's Institution and Raffles Junior College, before going on to the National University of Singapore where he majored in Economics and Psychology.

== Biography ==
Gay's first job in radio was as a presenter at Class 95FM, where he subsequently became the station's music director. He then became the music director at the newly-opened Power 98 FM in 1994.

Gay then moved into the television industry in 1995, becoming a music video programmer for Channel V in Hong Kong. In 1998, he returned to Singapore to become a news reporter at Channel NewsAsia. In December 2000, he moved to the new Singapore Press Holdings' division SPH MediaWorks television channel, TVWorks, as a presenter on The Straits Times TV News (later renamed Channel i News). When the channel folded at the end of 2004, he became an assistant news editor for the Straits Times newspaper. In 2005, he became the Singapore Press Holdings Head of Corporate Relations. He later moved back into broadcast journalism and had stints at CNBC Asia, Bloomberg TV and Reuters TV.

In 2012, Gay returned to the radio industry to join the new Singapore radio station Kiss 92FM. Since the station opened in August 2012, he has been the co-host of the station's breakfast show, 'Maddy, Jason and Arnold in the Mornings', from 6.00 – 10.00 am on weekdays together with Maddy Barber and Jason Johnson until March 2019. He left the station (and return to his original employers Mediacorp) to host the breakfast show, "Asia First", with former Money FM 89.3 DJ Yasmin Jonkers, on a revamped radio station, CNA938 (previously 938Now) for 4 years from 2019 - 2023.

At the start of 2024, he was promoted back as a Television Presenter on the main CNA channel to anchor the TV version of the "Asia First" programme to be partnered mainly with Julie Yoo and Elizabeth Neo, replacing Steve Lai who had moved to BBC News, thereby marking Gay's return to the television screens.

== Personal life ==
Gay has two brothers and one sister. His father was a Station Manager for British Airways and his mother was a bank officer.

Gay met his wife, Deborah Chia, when she was working as a DJ at Class 95FM. The couple have one son.
