= Channel i (Singaporean TV channel) =

Singaporean TV channel

- Country: Singapore
- Headquarters: 82 Genting Lane; Singapore 349567

Programming
- Language: English
- Picture format: 4:3 576i SDTV

Ownership
- Owner: SPH MediaWorks
- Sister channels: Channel U

History
- Launched: 20 May 2001; 25 years ago (as TVWorks); 3 March 2002; 24 years ago (as Channel i)
- Closed: 1 January 2005; 21 years ago
- Replaced by: Okto (children's, arts and sports programming, UHF 30 and StarHub TV channel space)
- Former names: TVWorks (2001-2002)

Availability (at time of closure)

Terrestrial
- Analog terrestrial television: Channel 30

Channel i was a Singaporean English language free-to-air terrestrial television channel owned by SPH MediaWorks, a broadcasting subsidiary of Singapore Press Holdings.

The channel was launched on 20 May 2001 as TVWorks, accompanying the Mandarin-language Channel U. It was initially poised to be a serious alternative to its competition—MediaCorp's Channel 5—by placing an emphasis on local productions rather than imported programming. However, this strategy proved to be unsuccessful weeks upon launching, due to low ratings, causing the channel to frequently change its schedule and positioning. It eventually settled on a format emphasizing action series, films, and sports.

In 2004, SPH announced an agreement to divest its television stations and free newspaper business to MediaCorp in exchange for a stake in its television and publishing businesses. While MediaCorp would take over Channel U as a sister to its Mandarin channel Channel 8, the broadcaster considered Channel i to be unviable due to low viewership and a lack of advertiser support, and it was shut down on 1 January 2005. The terrestrial frequency was left vacant until 2008, when Okto launched.

== History ==
=== Build up to launch ===
The first employee hired for the yet-unnamed channel in August 2000 was Andrea Teo, formerly one of the Under One Roof production team staffs, who would soon become its senior vice-president. On her first day, she was given a programme grid which still had a blank slot. From this initial task, SPH MediaWorks began signing a host of names to build the channel.

Logo used as TVWorks

The name and logo of the channel were revealed at the SPH MediaWorks trade launch on 1 November 2000. Later that month, it was announced that TVWorks would broadcast from a state-of-the-art 8,030 square-foot studio at The Pavillion in Singapore's city centre, the TV Works City Studio, which was seen by CEO Jamal Hassim to make it "visible and accessible". Until then, the team was working provisionally from Times Industrial Building at Thomson Road. Upon moving to The Pavillion, the channel had to consider the Far East Organisation's criteria (the station was set to be based there) by including "heritage programming that examines the roots of the people and places of Singapore". Ideas for breakfast and evening programmes were being studied. The studio, which, in order to be capable of a full television operation, had to be retrofitted with new equipment with "a few thousand dollars", also had an SNG link to a second, 4,500-square-foot one at the News Centre in Genting Lane.

On 1 December, Arnold Gay and Michelle Quah, formerly of Channel NewsAsia, joined TVWorks' news team. On 5 December, actress Lum May Yee was hired and was expected to take part in dramas, but had the possibility of hosting other programmes or acting in its sitcoms.

In January 2001, TVWorks revealed that much of the output carried by the new service would be local, as a counterweight to its future competitor Channel 5, promising that it wouldn't flood its airtime with foreign celebrities. An estimated 30 to 50% of the primetime schedule would be made in Singapore. The launch raft of acquisitions included movies such as The Cider House Rules and The Talented Mr. Ripley, as well as miniseries Jason and the Argonauts and Dinotopia. Contrary to Channel 5, the emphasis was on the quality of its productions and acquisitions, and that the local audience would also discuss US sitcoms such as The Trouble with Normal. One of the scheduled programmes, The Big Buffet, was going to be a variety show akin to Talentime from the SBC phase, while also including games segments, movie reviews and the latest local events. It expected to air in the evenings, between Monday and Thursday. Also on the pipeline was the sitcom Ah Girl, set in a mobile phone shop and produced by former SBC/TCS director Ong Su Mann of Phua Chu Kang Pte Ltd fame. A period drama series, tentatively titled Shangri La and set in the 1950s, was also being planned, created by Kelvin Tong, who also worked at The Straits Times as the movie critic for its lifestyle section Life!. TVWorks was branded as "The People's Channel" and was to be divided into programming belts: People Belt for programmes on "outstanding Singaporeans" (Golden Couples, CEOs At Play, From the Dot Above the Equator, Millionaires at 35); Global Village, which would air imported content on weekends. Each month would be themed and would include critically-acclaimed movies the channel bought; Streetsmart, aimed at teenagers, was set to air on weekend afternoons and would air music videos, interactive elements and would tackle topics common to the target audience. There were also plans for local events such as the Youth Festival and marching band competitions. Further movie titles expected at launch inculuded two James Bond titles (Octopussy and Tomorrow Never Dies), as well as Mr. Holland's Opus and The Whole Nine Yards. US TV series included Mysterious Ways, The Immortal, That's Life and The Weber Show. TVWorks secured the broadcast rights to the three matches of Manchester United's tour in Singapore, scheduled for July 2001, in a decision that was considered to be a "fatal blow" for Sportscity, which was also negotiating with rights holders ProEvents Management. The cost (revealed to be a "hefty sum") of the telecasts was not disclosed.

On 5 February, TVWorks had hired Junita Simon, Wendy Jacobs, Tirso Garcia, Serene Chan and Sebastian Tan. Simon had returned from a seven-month modelling phase in London and was hired by Dick Lee for being "young, beautiful and intelligent"; while Jacobs due to her great personality and being "outdoorsy". On 21 March, the channel's launch date was revealed (20 May) and it was announced that it would be added to SCV on channel 9.

TVWorks' primetime schedule (7 to 11pm) would exclusively consist of local content on Monday through Thursday nights, in a market where Channel 5 comedies Phua Chu Kang Pte Ltd and Under One Roof. The Big Buffet would air in a 90-minute slot from 8pm to 9:30pm. Other local titles included Paradise, View From the Top and Great Start. Foreign acquisitions were shown Fridays to Sundays, including prime time movies. The channel also acquired the full runs of Cheers and Seinfeld. The channel was set to air from 4pm to 2am on weekdays and from 10am to 1am on weekends. The channel would also have its own quiz show to compete with the Singaporean edition of Who Wants to Be a Millionaire?. In May, Russell Koh (played by Adrian Pang) was selected by the company to become the film reviewer for The Big Buffet. The channel also had a policy against buying US reality series such as Temptation Island, Big Brother and Survivor, which channel CEO Jamal Hassim thought to be "too abrasive".

=== TV Works: launch and early months ===
On 26 April 2001, SPH MediaWorks received a nationwide free-to-air television service licence from the Singapore Broadcasting Authority, allowing them to start broadcasting two channels, Channel U, a Chinese language channel, and TVWorks, an English channel. The channel was set to broadcast TV Land The Musical (named after a roadshow event SPH MediaWorks held on 29 April) on launch night. Companion magazine Works Weekly had its trade launch on 15 May 2001, while rehearsals for the inaugural musical were underway. Emma Bunton, formerly of the Spice Girls was one of the invited guests, and was set to perform What Took You So Long at the event. On 20 May 2001, TVWorks was launched.

Opening night consisted of the following programmes:

- 5:45pm − Making History: Story of TV Works (documentary on its launch)
- 6:15pm − Movie Special: Godzilla (no commercial breaks)
- 8:30pm − TV Land (prologue, featuring the backgrounds of the four characters of the musical)
- 9:00pm − TV Land: The Musical (inaugural musical on four Singaporeans and their dreams to be in TV Land. Featuing original music by Dick Lee)
- 10:30pm − It's Your Movie Night (movie chosen by the viewer on the website or on mobile (SingTel users only); vote ended one hour before airing, the winning movie ended up being The Replacement Killers)
- 12:30am − Close

A man in a Godzilla costume appeared Orchard Road to promote the premiere of the 1998 Godzilla movie, photographed by The Straits Times next to a hijacked car with his name sprayed over it. During the launch programme Making History, SPH MediaWorks CEO Lee Cheok Yew appeared, where he described TVWorks as "not just a channel full of acquired content which is easy to put together", referring to Channel 5, and aimed to present, for the first time on Singaporean television, a channel with "the best of local television". Regarding Channel 5's strategies, he said that Singaporeans had been exposed to American imports for "far too long", which he thought to be "nothing wrong"; as his vision for the channel implied doing "some of the best local television". Today, however, noticed the irony in launching the channel with its first movie, Godzilla, being an American production.

During TV Land and the 10:30pm movie, viewers could win S$25,000.

Beginning from its first day, the channel also employed heavy use of streaming media, using the Windows Media Video compression. The first programmes to do so were the TV Land musical (with data on the guests appearing on the web stream) and The Big Buffet, using the TakePartTV brand.

=== Failures and retools ===
The first night on air was seen with dismal ratings, the channel opened with Godzilla peaking in at 4.7%, whereas TV Land (which cost $1 million to produce) received much lower ratings of 1.6%. By contrast, competing Channel 5 always stayed above 10%, peaking at 18% on TVWorks' launch night. On 21 May, regular telecasts began with a 4pm-2am schedule and two news bulletins at 7:30pm and 10:30pm. The initial format of delivering a large amount of Singaporean content didn't draw in any viewers, and it changed tactics, giving more slots for foreign content. The changes caused criticism from a female viewer, who thought the revised programming was too male-skewing. Goodness Gracious Me was not well-seen by the Indian community, with complaints being made because of the sitcom's treatment of the Taj Mahal and how actress Meera Syal touched Nina Wadia's buttcheeks. The Singapore Broadcasting Authority as of 3 June did not receive any formal complaints regarding the series; the channel would thus continue airing it.

In June, The Big Buffet cut its length. To boost its ratings, the channel used two series, Ah Girl and Paradise, both local titles filmed in other countries in the region, as well as reality shows, which channel COO Jamal Hassim had previously criticised, justifying it on "teamwork among participants". For this end, the channel acquired Combat Missions from Mark Burnett Productions and The Mole. The highest ratings so far came on the first match of the Manchester United tour of Singapore in July, with 322,450 viewers tuning in. On 7 July, it was named the official channel of New Face, an event promoted by its sister outlet The New Paper. As part of the event roadmap, the channel would be the first to announce the twenty finalists. That month also saw the announcement of a major revamp for August. In an attempt to boost ratings, the amount of "entertainment-driven" shows would increase, as infotainment shows attracted niche audiences. Several local programmes were cancelled all at once: The Men's Room (seven episodes), Hot Chilli and The Odd Squad (both were retooled in June and lost ratings; The Odd Squad was set to return in August). Paradise, the channel's first serial drama, ended after eight out of thirteen episodes filmed, due to bad ratings and erratic weather conditions on the province of Batangas, Philippines, where the series was filmed. Several of its artistes also lost their exclusivity contracts.

The channel started carrying highlights of the FA Premier League at the start of the 2001-02 season. This came ahead of a new "quality over quantity" schedule that was introduced for the 2001–02 season, and a rebrand on 3 September 2001. In contrast to its attempts at producing local programming, TVWorks' schedule now heavily resembled that of Channel 5, with a focus on imported programming (typically from the United States). So far, its only success was its coverage of the Manchester United tour of Singapore two months earlier. The channel still hoped that its Premier League matches would help keep its ratings afloat. Its coverage of the 2001 general election had 169,000 viewers, a number that paled to 1.721 million over the combined total of MediaCorp's channels.

Suhaila Sulaiman, writing for her Couch Grouch column at The Straits Times on 3 September, date of the rebrand, said that the channel could have invested better its financial resources on acquiring programmes first instead of producing them. The reformat gave the team more time to work on local programmes. When news of the September 11 attacks began to circulate, TVWorks was airing The Assignment, a film which includes a terrorist plot. In the aftermath, the channel started airing live coverage from Fox News from 15 September, weekends 12:30am to 2am, and weekdays 11am to 5:30pm, then 1am–2am. TVWorks thus extended its operating hours for the first time. On 30 September, it became the first channel to air the Italian league (Serie A) in full, with one match every Sunday. It was shown on a delayed basis at 10:30pm due to the 9:30pm news bulletin and the 10pm airing of Eye Witness.

At the end of September, TVWorks increased its average reach from 42% at launch time to 46%, as consequence of the September retool. The main reason was the late night movie slots on Mondays and Tuesdays (attracting more than double of the average 0.6% on a regular night). From 4 October, it added a weekly action movie slot on Thursday nights, justified by channel COO Jamal Hassan as the genre was "mass-driven". Two of its programmes were nominated at the 2001 Asian Television Awards. The month ended with the relocation of its news studios, after initial rumours suggested that TVWorks would shut down. The Far East Square studios and editing suite would continue, but most operations would move to the SPH News Centre at Kallang.

On 9 November 2001, TVWorks was restructured following a loss of 65 employees and a decreasing audience share. Plans for its shutdown were dismissed. Moreover, local media analysts and economists believed that SPH MediaWorks had its comfort zone with Channel U and the majority Chinese population, and that an English-language channel was risk-taking. These events led to the suspension of its associated magazine, Works Weekly. In January 2002, TVWorks secured the rights to carry one weekly match of the Italian league (Serie A), that had previously been carried by Premiere 12. Furthermore, sports coverage was boosted in February with the announcement of the rights to air the S-League free-to-air, which up until then aired on MediaCorp's channels. The first match to be televised was between Tampines and Geylang on 2 March.

=== As Channel i ===
On 25 February 2002, it was announced that TVWorks would rebrand as Channel i on 3 March 2002. Under the new name, Channel i would put a strong emphasis on action entertainment and coverage of the S.League, as well as offering movies every evening. The new brand reflected "the habits, preferences and tastes of the viewers". The channel would also increase its synergies with Channel U as a cost-savings measure, including talent sharing and cross-promotional events, and SPH promoting the two channels together in advertising as a "double" offering. With the rebrand, the channel added a new news bulletin, Cue, at 6pm, targeting a different demographic than that of the 9:30 p.m. bulletin. Ratings for the channel grew largely due to the success of S-League matches.

A new movie slot was added in June 2002, alongside an interactive music show, i2u. In July, the channel secured the rights to air the qualifying rounds for Euro 2004, in a package of thirteen matches.

The contract to air the S-League was extended in February 2003 to cover the 2003 and 2004 seasons.

A multi-year agreement with Paramount Pictures was signed in March 2003 and took effect from 1 June the same year. The Straits Times TV News was renamed Channel i News on 19 May 2003. The new format was heavily visual.

The channel rebranded on 3 November 2003, adopting what would be its last slogan, "Total Entertainment, The Way You Like It". Emphasis was given to non-stop entertainment from 9pm (Channel i News moved to 8:30pm).

Channel i News won the "Best News Programme" award at the Asian Television Awards on 4 December 2003.

A new local sitcom, Durian King, was announced in May 2004, starring Kym Ng and Adrian Pang.

=== Shutdown and aftermath ===
On 17 September 2004, SPH announced an agreement to divest its television stations and free newspaper businesses to MediaCorp, in exchange for a stake in its television and publishing businesses. At the time, the commercial viability of Channel i was under review. Days later, a letter sent to The Straits Times suggested that Channel i should continue operating, as MediaWorks' shows had "more substance" than MediaCorp's. However, due to the small size of the English-language television market and other factors, Channel i was deemed unviable, and was shut down on 1 January 2005 at 1.30 am, with the last program being a repeat of the final edition Channel i News. Channel U would continue to operate as a sister channel to Channel 8. Three years later, its channel allotments on UHF (30) and StarHub TV (8) were taken over by Okto which aired from 19 October 2008 until 1 May 2019. The analogue frequency was deactivated and decommissioned on 2 January 2019.

== Visual identity ==
The channel's first logo was a tilted square with TV in it and a lowercase "works" wordmark, changed during prelaunch to an uppercase wordmark (see History above). This was replaced on 3 March 2002 by an i-sphere, in red, complementing the logo Channel U used.

== Former programmes ==
=== as TVWorks ===
- TV Works News (later renamed Straits Times TV News and Channel i News)
- The Big Buffet – biweekly run
- Big Chilli Wednesday/Hot Chilli
- The Odd Squad
- Jalan Jalan
- The Big Break (originally part of The Big Buffet, later separate from it)
- The Mensroom
- Here's A Million – Gameshow (65 episodes on weeknights, 2001)
- After Hours – Talk show
- It's All In The Body – Info-Ed
- Dollars & Sense – Current Affairs
- Paradise – drama series
- Your Home – home decoration with Nadya Hutagalung, formerly part of the casts of Paradise

=== as Channel i ===
- Ah Girl (3 seasons) – Sitcom
- Channel i News – News
- Cue – Current affairs
- Eyewitness – Current affairs (from 9 September 2001)
- Durian King – Drama
- Fat to Fit – Reality
- Heath Matters – Current affairs
- iContact – Current affairs
- i On The News – Current affairs
- i2u – Variety
- Makansutra (4 seasons) – Infotainment
- Perceptions – Drama
- Singapore Shakes – Drama
- Six Weeks – Drama
- On Today – Current affairs
- The Money Tree – Current affairs (from 18 September 2003)
- World Life – Current affairs

== See also ==
- Channel U (Singaporean TV channel)
- Channel 5 (Singaporean TV channel)
- Central (TV channel)
- City TV (Singapore)
- CNA (TV network)
- TVMobile
- One FM 91.3
- SPH MediaWorks
