= Carol Smith (radio presenter) =

Singaporean radio presenter

- Born: 25 October 1975 (age 51); Singapore
- Education: Nanyang Technological University
- Occupation: Radio DJ

Caroline Jane "Carol" Smith (born 25 October 1975) is a radio presenter from Singapore. She currently co-presents the morning show on One FM 91.3 with Lavinia Tan . She was previously a presenter on Class 95FM from 2007 to 2011 and with Kiss92 from 2017 to 2022.

== Biography ==
A Eurasian Singaporean, Smith worked as a teacher before joining Class 95FM. Schools she has taught at include CHIJ St Theresa's Convent and Catholic Junior College.

Smith was a DJ at Class 95FM from 2007 to 2011. She then left the radio industry and founded Free To Be, a social enterprise running life-skills workshops, camps and seminars for teenage girls and at-risk women.

Smith returned to the radio industry in 2015. She served as the Assistant Programme Director at 987FM from 2015 to 2016. Smith joined Kiss 92FM in 2017, formerly presenting the Drive show until mid 2022 and the Morning show until January 2023.

As of February 2023, Smith currently co-presents 'The Brightside' alongside Lavinia Tan on One FM 91.3
