= Low Teck Seng =

Singaporean engineer and academic administrator

- Born: 6 August 1955 (age 71); Kuala Pilah, Negeri Sembilan, Malaysia
- Education: Southampton University
- Occupations: Technical Leader and Engineer
- Employer(s): National University of Singapore, National Research Foundation (Singapore)
- Spouse: Ann Ang Gek Hoon
- Awards: Fellow Institute of Electrical and Electronics Engineers, 2001; Pingat Pentadbiran Awam Gold (Singapore), 2007; Fellow of the Royal Academy of Engineering (UK), 2014; Chevalier de Légion d'Honneur (France), 2016

Low Teck Seng is a Singaporean engineer and academic administrator. He was dean of engineering at the National University of Singapore (NUS), founding principal of Republic Polytechnic, and managing director of Agency for Science, Technology and Research (A*STAR) before becoming chief executive officer of the National Research Foundation, Prime Minister's Office. He returned to NUS in 2022 where he served as Senior Vice President (Sustainability & Resilience) till July 2025. He is currently Senior Advisor to the President of NUS.

Prof. Low currently co-chairs Singapore's National Quantum Steering Committee, and the Singapore Maritime Institute.

== Early life and education ==
Low was born in Kuala Pilah, a small town in Negeri Sembilan, Malaysia and completed his high school education at Swiss Cottage Secondary School in Singapore. He attended Southampton University department of Electrical and Computer Science receiving a B.Sc in 1978. He went on to receive a Ph.D. in 1982, also from Southampton University, for his work on modeling permanent magnets supervised by Kenneth J. Binns. Low was also honored with a D.Sc degree from Southampton University in 2009.

== Career ==
In 1983, Low joined the faculty of the National University of Singapore (NUS) to teach and to conduct research in magnetic devices.

In 1992, with the support of Philip Yeo (Chair of Economic Development Board) and funding from National Science and Technology Board, Low founded the Magnetics Technology Centre (MTC). MTC was later renamed the Data Storage Institute (DSI)) and operated from 1983 to 2018 conducting research and development primarily on hard disk drives in collaboration with major industrial partners such as Seagate, Maxtor and Conner Peripherals. Low's contributions were recognized with the National Science and Technology Medal in 2004.

From 1998 to 2000, Low served as Dean of NUS Faculty of Engineering in the NUS.

In 2002, Low was tasked as the principal and CEO in founding a new junior college in Singapore. In 2003, Low became the founding principal of Republic Polytechnic which was established and first admitted students in 2003 focused initially on Applied Science, Engineering, and Information and Communications. In 2007, the polytechnic moved to a new 20 hectare campus in Woodlands that can accommodate 13,000 students. Low was subsequently recognized with the Public Administration Medal (Gold).

From 2010 to 2012, Low was managing director of A*STAR, a statutory board under the Ministry of Trade and Industry of Singapore.

In 2012, Low took on a new portfolio, as CEO of the National Research Foundation (NRF) a department in the Prime Minister's Office (Singapore). In this role, Low sets the direction of research and development efforts across Singapore, with the latest 5-year Research, Innovation and Enterprise (RIE) Plan working with a budget of S$25 billion (2020).

In August 2022, Low retired from his position as CEO NRF, and returned to NUS to assume the position of Senior Vice President (Sustainability & Resilience) on 8 August 2022, joining the ranks of the senior leadership team.

In 2016, Low was designated the new Chairman of Singapore Post replacing Ho Kee LIM. He caused some consternation, however, when, within a few days, he announced that he realized the job would "demand more time and focus" than he would be able to give. The post was ultimately filled by Simon Israel and Low subsequently retired from the board.

Low is on the advisory panel for Paris Sciences and Lettres, a prestigious French public university in Paris. He is also a member of the selection committee for the Queen Elizabeth Prize for Engineering.

== Personal life ==
Low and his wife, Ann Ang Gek Hoon, reside in Singapore. They have two sons.

== Awards and recognition ==
- In 2001, Low was elevated to IEEE Fellow "for leadership in the development of technology for magnetic data storage".
- In 2004, Low received the National Science and Technology Medal (Singapore) "awarded to outstanding individuals who have made distinguished, sustained and exceptional contributions and played a strategic role in the development of Singapore through the promotion and management of R&D".
- In 2007, the President of Singapore awarded Teck Seng Low the Public Administration Medal of Singapore (Gold). The medal was given to Low "for outstanding efficiency, competence and industry" in his capacity as Principal and CEO of Republic Polytechnic.
- In 2009, Low received the honorary degree of Doctor of Science, D.Sc. h.c., from Southampton University.
- In 2012, Low became a Fellow of the Singapore Academy of Engineering
- In 2014, Low became an International Fellow of the Royal Academy of Engineering, UK.
- In 2016, Low was made a Knight of the National Order of the Legion of Honour, one of the highest honours accorded by the President of France. This award recognises Prof Low's "outstanding vision and extraordinary efforts to drive and advance science and technology cooperation between France and Singapore".
- In 2017, Low was the recipient of the IES/IEEE Joint Medal of Excellence "for outstanding contributions to Singapore's R&D landscape"

Low is the author or coauthor of numerous technical publications and patents predominantly on the topics of servo control and on hard disk drives. He is coauthor of the book "The Singapore Research Story" detailing the rapid growth of Singapore's technological capabilities. He is also the featured individual in a story in Mechanical Engineering Magazine that talks about the success of NRF in attracting scientific talent to Singapore.
