= Valen Low =

Singaporean professional armwrestler (born 1994)

- 卢威麟
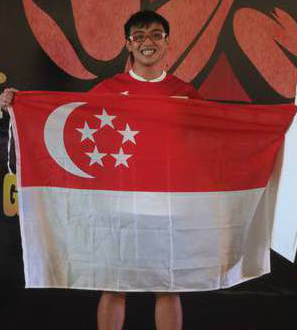
- Valen Low holding the flag of Singapore.
- Born: Low Wai Luen Valen; 14 January 1994 (age 32); Singapore
- Other name: The Godfather
- Occupation: Personal Trainer
- Height: 1.69 m (5 ft 7 in)
- Title: Southeast Asia Armwrestling Champion; Oceania Armwestling Champion; Asia Youth Arm Wrestling Champion
- Website: Facebook

Competition record

Arm wrestling

Representing Singapore

AAF Asia Armwrestling Championships
1st	2014 Right Hand Youth U21 65-70kg
2nd	2014 Left Hand Youth U21 65-70kg

Pattaya International Armwrestling Championships
3rd	2014 Seniors U75kg

Arnold Classic Australia Armwrestling Cup
1st	2014 Seniors U80kg
4th	2015 Seniors U80kg
3rd	2016 Seniors U80kg

China International Armwrestling Championships
1st	2015 Right Hand Senior U70kg
3rd	2015 Left Hand Open
2nd	2016 Right Hand Senior U75kg
6th	2016 Left Hand Senior U80kg
2nd	2019 Left Hand Senior U70kg
6th	2019 Right Hand Senior U70kg

Singapore Armwrestling National Championships
1st	2021 Right Hand Senior U63kg
1st	2021 Left Hand Senior U63kg
1st	2021 Right Hand Senior Open
1st	2021 Left Hand Senior Open

Valen Low Wai Luen (simplified Chinese: 卢威麟; traditional Chinese: 盧威麟; pinyin: Lú Wēi Lín; born 14 January 1994) is a Singaporean professional armwrestler. He won the 2014 FitX Armwrestling Cup in Melbourne, Australia, as well as 1st and 2nd place, for right and left handed armwrestling respectively, at the Asia Armwrestling Championships 2014.

Low is the founder of Singapore Armwrestling, the only armwrestling club in Singapore. He has attributed his success in the sport to training with the Singapore Armwrestling Team.

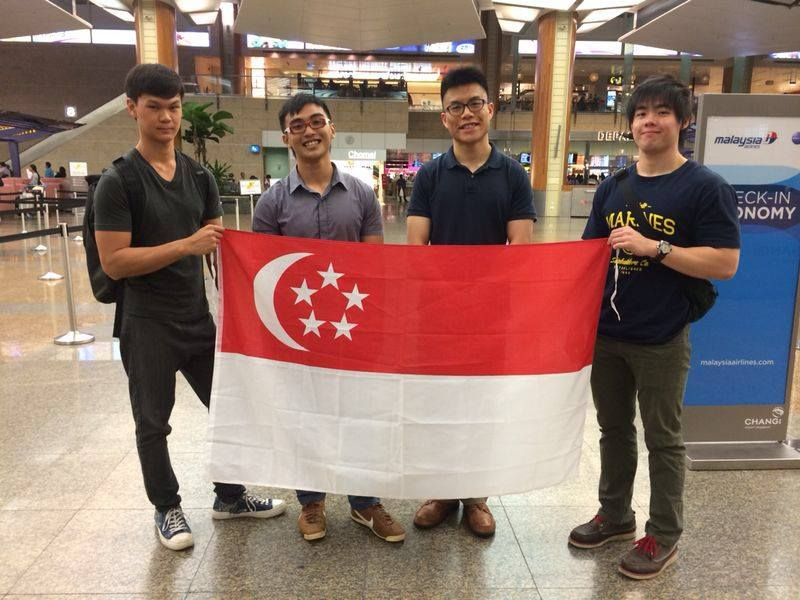
Singapore Armwrestling Team at Changi Airport

Low have also promoted armwrestling via community events in the Nee Soon East region such as the Block party for Nee Soon East, Nee Soon East bursary awards 2016, Armwrestling promotions at Heart of God church. Corporate events such as Batman vs Superman run, OCBC Bank dinner and dance, Citibank dinner and dance was also part of his resume to promote the sport of armwrestling. He also co-organized the schoolyard armwrestling meet in 2015 and ITE college central armwrestling championships to further promote armwrestling for youth development. Low also spearheaded and organised the inaugural Singapore Armwrestling National Championships in 2021.

== Biography ==
Low began armwrestling at the age of 13, and developed a passion for the sport while attending Whitley Secondary School. He graduated with a Diploma with merit, multiple directors roll of honour and module prize award from Republic Polytechnic, majoring in Health Management and Promotion.

Low has claimed to have been mocked and laughed at due to his passion for armwrestling, with his teachers describing his endeavours as "useless, a waste of time, nothing to achieve". His former form teacher once tried to ban him from armwrestling. However, he was not discouraged and devoted time to armwrestling training.

After Low's O-level examinations in late 2010, he travelled to Malacca, Malaysia to compete in his first armwrestling competition. He was eliminated in the quarter-finals of the men's open, over 85 kg category. Throughout 2011, he competed at a junior level at competitions in Malaysia, placing first several times. In 2012, he competed in the men's middle weight category, again winning several competitions. Between 2011 and 2012 he won multiple Malaysia national titles. In 2013, he competed against Jian Jikan, Indonesia's top middleweight armwrestler, resulting in a 4–1 win for Low. In May 2017, he defeated Malaysia's number 1 armwrestler, 2015 Asian Champion, Arnold Classic Asia 2016 Champion, Joffey Jolly, attaining the top spot in the South East Asia armwrestling rankings. Low is currently ranked first in South East Asia for his respective weight class.

== Armwrestling career highlights ==
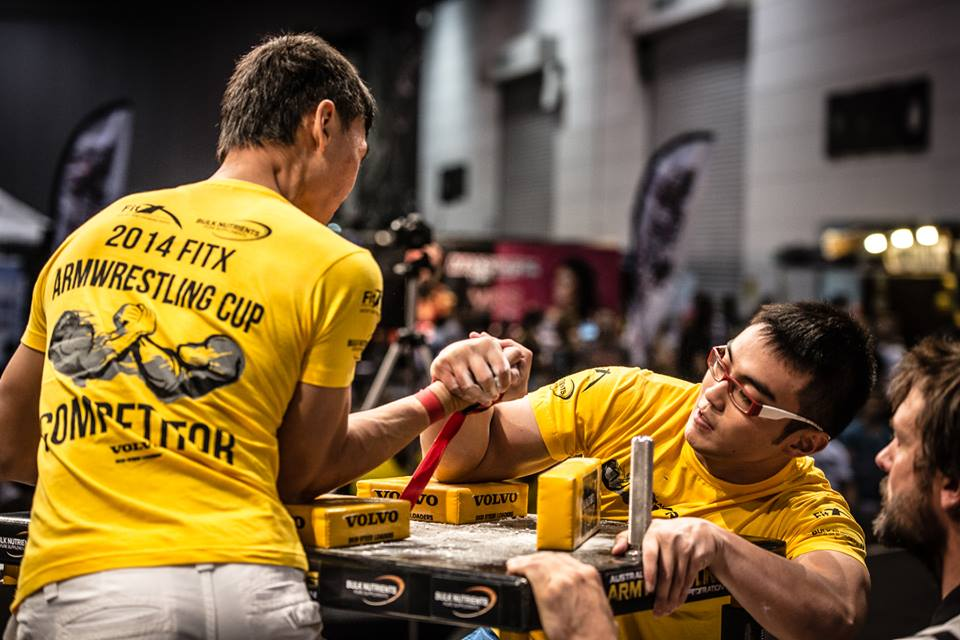
Valen Low vs Melvyn Loh in the Finals of the FitX Armwrestling Cup 2014

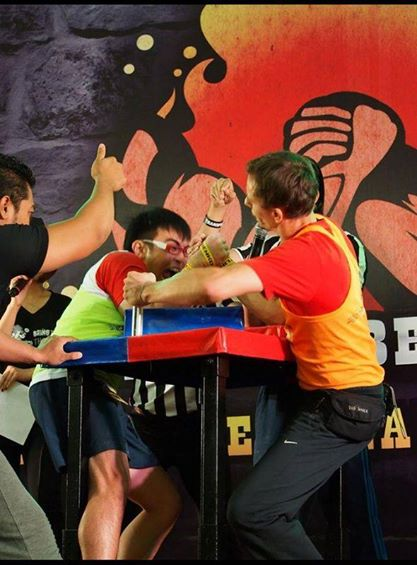
Valen Low vs Dmitry Motorin at the Pattaya International Armwrestling Championships

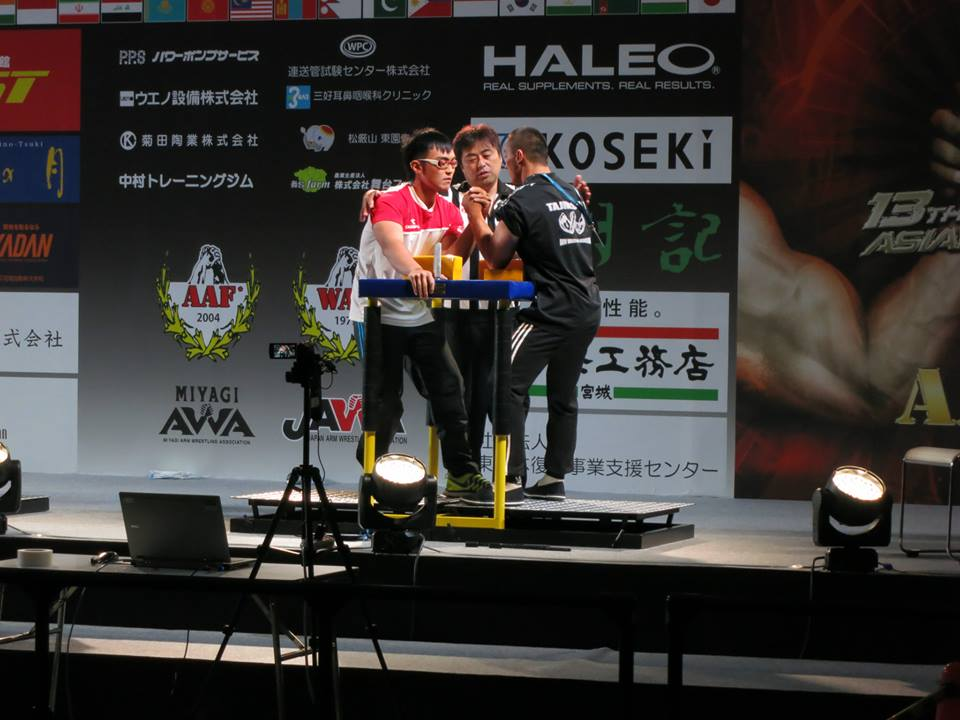
Valen Low at the Asia Armwrestling Championships 2014

=== Arnold Classic Australia ===
In 2014, Low was invited by the Australian Armwrestling Federation (AAF) to compete in the FitX Armwrestling Cup during the FitX Sport & Fitness Expo. He travelled to Melbourne for the competition using the $1000 prize he won from the Shin Min Armwrestling Challenge earlier that year. The FitX competition was Southeast Asia and Oceania's biggest armwrestling competition that year. Low and a fellow Singaporean, Melvyn Loh Hao Jie, competed in the under 80 kg category. Low won his weight category and emerged as the champion of the senior under 80 kg category. He ranked 1st out of the other 7 competitors from Singapore, Malaysia, Australia, and New Zealand. Following the competition, Low ranked first in the under 80 kg weight class in Oceania, and his teammate, Melvyn Loh, ranked second. In 2015, Low ranked 4th and in 2016 he placed 3rd.

=== Asia Armwrestling Championships 2014 ===
In June 2014, Low, and fellow Singaporean, Desmond Lau, self-funded and competed in the 13th Asian Armwrestling Championships in Sendai, Japan from 27 to 29 June 2014. Valen competed in the under 21 years, 65 kg-70 kg left and right handed classes. He came in first in the right hand category and was the first runner up for the left hand category. So far, he has been the only Singaporean to achieve the title.

=== Pattaya International Armwrestling Championships 2014 ===
Low along with Singapore arm wrestler, Tay Jia Jun, competed in the Pattaya International Armwrestling Championships on 6 September 2014. The event had more than 50 competitors in each category, hailing from countries such as Kazakhstan, Russia, Malaysia, Indonesia, South Korea, and the host country, Thailand. The competition also contained 3 different weight divisions: under 75 kg, 85 kg, and 85 kg+. Low achieved the title of second runner-up in the senior under 75 kg category by beating Russia's Dmitry Motorin, the first runner-up in the under 75 kg division of the 2013 Moscow Championships and the 8th-place winner of the right hand under 70 kg category in the highly regarded A1 Russian Open 2013. Low also achieved 6th place in the under 85 kg category and fellow Singaporean, Tay Jia Jun, attained 5th place in the senior under 85 kg category.

=== China International Armwrestling Championships ===
Low was invited to Shenzhen, China to compete in the China International Armwrestling Championships 2015. The event had competitors from Malaysia, Thailand, Philippines, South Korea, Taiwan and China. He came in first in the under 70 kg right arm category by defeating China's number one ranked under 70 kg armwrestler. He also came in third in the left arm open category despite weighing much lighter than his opponents. Low was again invited to China to compete in the China International Armwrestling Championships 2016. This time the event had more competitors such as Ukraine and Japan to add onto last year's list. He competed in the right arm under 75 kg and left arm under 80 kg categories. He came in 2nd losing out to his rival competitor from China 林伟忠. Low competed in the left hand under 80 kg and placed 6th. In 2019, Low competed in the China International Armwrestling Championships. This is the first time the competition invited international competitors, including Mindaugas Tarasaitis and Joffey Jolly. He ranked 2nd in the left arm category behind Mindaugas Tarasaitis from Lithuania.

=== World Armwrestling Championships 2015 ===
Low spearheaded the Singapore Armwrestling Team to the 37th World Armwrestling Championships held in Kuala Lumpur, Malaysia. This was Singapore's inaugural participation in the World Armwrestling Championships. Low competed in the Junior under 21 years old, under 70 kg category left and right arm. He placed 11 out of 19 competitors in the left arm category, being defeated by Turkey and Russia while winning Egypt. For the right arm category, he placed 11 out of 22 competitors, winning Turkey and Uzbekistan while being defeated by Russia and Georgia.

=== East vs West 17 ===
On March 29, 2025, Low competed in a right-hand supermatch against American armwrestler Hunter Noffz at the East vs West 17 event in Arlington, Texas. This event marked Low’s first invitation to compete at East vs West, making him the first Southeast Asian athlete and the first athlete of Chinese descent to participate in the prestigious armwrestling competition. Low competed in the 77 kg weight class—one class higher than his usual 70 kg category—in a best-of-five format.

Hunter Noffz, the top-ranked 80 kg armwrestler in the United States and known for defeating top competitors such as Patrick Berg from Sweden and Doug Erlich from the United States, was considered a strong favorite going into the match. Despite being a major underdog, Low performed spectacularly beyond expectations. He narrowly lost the closely contested match 2–3, securing two rounds and pushing the bout to a decisive fifth round. The match was widely noted for its intensity and competitiveness, and was considered an eye-opening benchmark for the strength level in Southeast Asia and Singapore. Low demonstrated significant resilience, technical skill, and strategic prowess, solidifying his reputation as a rising figure in international armwrestling.

== Powerlifting - Bench Press ==
In addition to armwrestling, Valen has competed in raw powerlifting in Singapore, specifically the bench press. At the 2013 Singapore Powerlifting Open, he bench pressed 131 kg at his body weight of 80 kg and ranked second for the bench press in the under 83 kg weight class. As of 2014, his personal best has been bench pressing 150 kg at a body weight of 77 kg. His personal best as of August 2014 was 142.5 kg at a body weight of 74 kg. Valen competed in an unofficial push-pull meet on 27 December 2014, and bench pressed 147.5 kg at a body weight of 72.6 kg, pressing more than 2 times his body weight. Valen competed in an official bench press meet at Elevate gym on 10 July 2016. He pressed a record breaking 157.5 kg at a bodyweight of 74 kg. This sets the highest bench only record for the under 74 kg weight class at that time.

It's not that the students are incapable. It's that their abilities are dormant and it's up to the educators to draw out that potential.

— Valen Low and his views on education, February 2014.

== Media ==
In October 2014, MediaCorp Channel 5 aired the television series Secret Singapore, which featured Low and his armwrestling team in their profile on armwrestling in Singapore. This was the first time Valen appeared on national television. On 9 December 2014, he made another media appearance. This time he was being featured on Channel NewsAsia's Singapore Tonight news programme. Channel NewsAsia described Low as 'Singapore youths making waves in niche sports', highlighting his achievements in overseas competitions such as the FitX Armwrestling Cup 2014 and the Asia Armwrestling Championships 2014. The news also discussed the funding challenges he faced in pursuing his armwrestling endeavors. On top of these, he appeared on multiple local and international media. These include The Royal Singapore, Channel NewsAsia, Harian Metro and South China Times.

=== Professional supermatches ===
Year	Opponent	Result	Hand	Weight Class	Outcome	Event
2023	(Singapore) Lionel Yeo (SGP)	Won	Right Arm	63 kg	3–0	UAC #2
2023	(Australia) Joshua Burnett (AUS)	Won	Left Arm	77 kg	3–0	UAC #2
2024	(Philippines) Kent Tan (PH)	Won	Right Arm	Open	3–0	PAC Open
2024	(Philippines) Shaun Chispa (PH)	Won	Left Arm	80 kg	3–0	PAC Open
2024	(Philippines) Jerwin Berturan (PH)	Won	Right Arm	85 kg	3–0	SEA Cup: Unfinished Business
2025	(United States) Hunter Noffz (USA)	Lost	Right Arm	77 kg	2–3	East vs West 17
2025	(Singapore) Bernard Chong (SGP)	Won	Left Arm	Open	3–1	UAC x Super Loco

== Awards ==
- Malacca Open 2010 – Senior Heavyweight Open 5th
- Malaysia Armsport De Tour Nationals 2011 – Juniors under 19 Open 1st
- Johor Open 2011 - Juniors under 19 Open 1st
- Ipoh Gegaria Armwrestling 2011 – Juniors under 19 years Open 1st
- Ipoh Gegaria Armwrestling 2011 – Senior Heavyweight Open 4th
- Pahang Metro Armwrestling 2011 – Juniors under 19 years Open 1st
- Over Time Armwrestling Johor 2011 – Senior Heavyweight Open 1st
- Mersing Metro Armwrestling 2012 – Senior Middleweight(75–85 kg) 1st
- Terengganu Metro Armwrestling 2012 - Senior Heavyweight Open 3rd
- Malacca Open 2012 – Men's Right Open 1st – Senior Left Open 4th
- Malacca Metro Armwrestling 2012 – Senior Middleweight(75–85 kg) 1st
- MCA Club Cheng Malacca 2012 – Senior Middleweight(75–85 kg) 1st
- Plaza Alam Sentral Armwrestling 2012 – Senior Above 75 kg 1st
- Malacca International Open 2012 – Senior Middleweight(75–85 kg) 1st
- Armwrestling X Challenge Johor 2013 – Senior Above 75 kg 1st
- Spinach and Sports Armwrestling 2013 – Senior Middleweight(75–85 kg) 1st
- Astro Fiesta Armwrestling 2013 – Senior Above 80 kg 3rd
- Malacca Open 2013 – Senior Middleweight(75–85 kg) 1st
- Malacca Invitationals 2013 – Senior Middleweight(75–85 kg) 1st
- Realfitgym Metro Point Open 2013 – Senior Heavyweight Open 1st
- Matic Fest Armwrestling 2013 – Senior Middleweight(75–85 kg) 2nd
- Matic Fest Armwrestling 2013 – Senior Heavyweight Open 3rd
- Infinity Armwrestling Challenge 2013 - Senior Heavyweight Open 3rd
- Shin Min Armwrestling Challenge 2014 – Senior Open 1st
- FitX Armwrestling Cup Australia 2014 – Senior Lightweight 80 kg 1st
- Selangor Armwrestling Championship 2014 – Senior Middleweight(75–85 kg) 1st
- Selangor Armwrestling Championship 2014 – Senior Heavyweight Open 2nd
- Armwrestling Ultimate Challenge 2014 – Senior Middleweight(75–85 kg) 1st
- Armwrestling Ultimate Challenge 2014 – Senior Heavyweight Open 2nd
- Asia Armwrestling Championships 2014 – Youth under 21 years, 65 kg-70 kg left hand 2nd
- Asia Armwrestling Championships 2014 – Youth under 21 years, 65 kg-70 kg right hand 1st
- Pattaya International Armwrestling Championships 2014 - Senior under 75 kg 3rd
- Pattaya International Armwrestling Championships 2014 - Senior under 85 kg 6th
- Game of Arms Semenyih 2014 - Senior 75 kg 1st
- Maticfest Open 2014 - Senior Middleweight(75–85 kg) 1st
- Dataran Merdeka Open 2014 - Senior Left 75 kg 1st
- Hulu Langat Armwrestling Competition - Senior Heavyweight Open 1st
- Cheng Malacca Armwrestling Open 2014 - Senior Heavyweight Right Open 1st
- Cheng Malacca Armwrestling Open 2014 - Senior Left Open 1st
- Arnold Classic Australia Armwrestling Cup 2015 - Senior u80 kg 4th
- KIP Mart Tampoi Armwrestling Challenge 2015 - Senior under 75 kg 3rd
- China International Armwrestling Championships 2015 - Senior Under 70 kg 1st
- China International Armwrestling Championships 2015 - Senior Left Open 3rd
- World Armwrestling Championships 2015 - Youth Under 21 years, 65 kg-70 kg Right Hand 11th
- World Armwrestling Championships 2015 - Youth Under 21 years, 65–75 kg Left Hand 11th
- Malaysia Armwars Championships 2015 - Senior 75–85 kg 2nd
- JST Thailand Championships 2015 - Senior 80 kg; 4th
- JST Thailand Championships 2015 - Senior Open; 5th
- Johor Open 2015 - Senior 75–85 kg 1st
- Arnold Classic Australia Armwrestling Cup 2016 - Senior Right 80 kg 3rd
- Dataran One Malacca 2016 - Senior Right Above 75 kg 1st
- UMNO Johor Open 2016 - Senior Right Above 80 kg 1st
- Carnival Orang Bersi Mahkota Dewa Johor 2016 - Senior Right Above 75 kg 1st
- Mr Seremban Armwrestling Championship 2016 - Senior Right Above 85 kg 1st
- China International Armwrestling Championships 2016 - Senior Right 75 kg 2nd
- China International Armwrestling Championships 2016 - Senior Left 80 kg 5th
- KIP Mart Tampoi Johor Armwrestling 2016 - Senior Right 75 kg 1st
- Shin Min Armwrestling 2016 - Senior Right Above 70 kg 1st
- Premiere 101 International Open 2017 - Senior Right 75 kg 1st
- Muar International Open 2017 - Senior Right 75 kg; 2nd
- Super 16 Pangolinarms - Senior Open; 2nd
- Shanghai Open 2019 (Spring edition) - Senior Left 78 kg; 1st
- Shanghai Open 2019 (Spring edition)- Senior Right 78 kg; 2nd
- D1 China International Open 2019 - Senior Left 70 kg; 2nd
- D1 China International Open 2019 - Senior Right 70 kg; 6th
- Shanghai Open 2019 (Autumn edition) - Senior Left 70 kg; 1st
- Shanghai Open 2019 (Autumn edition) - Senior Right 70 kg; 3rd
- Singapore Armwrestling National Championships 2021 - Senior Right 63 kg; 1st
- Singapore Armwrestling National Championships 2021 - Senior Left 63 kg; 1st
- Singapore Armwrestling National Championships 2021 - Senior Right Open; 1st
- Singapore Armwrestling National Championships 2021 - Senior Left Open; 1st
- Over the Top "Down Under" 2022 - Senior Right 70 kg; 4th
- Over the Top "Down Under" 2022 - Senior Left 70 kg; 1st
- OSSU Games Japan open 2023 - Senior Left 70 kg; 4th
- Vietnam Open 2023 - Senior Right 70 kg; 1st
- Vietnam Open 2023 - Senior Left 70 kg; 3rd
- UAC #2 2023 Right Arm 63 kg - Valen Low vs Lionel Yeo (SGP); 3-0
- UAC #2 2023 Left Arm 77 kg - Valen Low vs Joshua Burnett (AUS); 3-0
- Top 8 Singapore Open 2024 - Senior Right Open; 1st
- PAC Open 2024 Right Arm Open - Valen Low vs Kent Tan (PH); 3-0
- PAC Open 2024 Left Arm 80 kg - Valen Low vs Shaun Chispa (PH); 3-0
- SEA Cup (UNFINISHED BUSINESS) 2024 Right Arm 85 kg - Valen Low vs Jerwin Berturan (PH); 3-0
- East vs West 17 2025 Right Arm 77 kg - Valen Low vs Hunter Noffz (USA); 2-3
- UAC X SUPER LOCO 2025 Left Arm Open - Valen Low vs Bernard Chong (SGP); 3-1

Amateur Supermatches:

- Valen Low vs Joemissie Joe(MAS) 2012 RH (4–1)
- Valen Low vs Jian Jikan(INA) 2013 RH (4–1)
- Valen Low vs Chung Vui(MAS) 2013 RH (5–0)
- Valen Low vs Joffey Jolly(MAS) 2013 RH (2–1)
- Valen Low vs Jason Tibok(CND) 2014 RH (0-5)
- Valen Low vs Glad Chiang(TWN) 2014 LH (5-0)
- Valen Low Vs Ryan Bowen(AUS) 2015 LH (3-0)
- Valen Low vs Zurab Kavtaradze(NZ) 2016 LH (3-2)
- Valen Low vs 林青弘(Taiwan) 2016 RH (3-0)
