= Jason Johnson (radio presenter) =

- Born: December 8, 1967 (age 58); Lethbridge, Alberta, Canada
- Occupations: Radio DJ; Film & music critic

Jason Francis Johnson (born 8 December 1967) is a radio presenter from Canada who had co-presented the breakfast show on Kiss 92FM in Singapore together with Maddy Barber and Divian Nair. He was previously a movie and music reviewer for the Singapore newspaper The New Paper.

== Biography ==
Johnson grew up in Lethbridge, Alberta, Canada, before moving to Singapore in 1995.

Since Kiss 92FM opened in August 2012, Johnson has been the co-host of the station's breakfast show, 'Maddy & Jason', from 6.00 - 10.00 am on weekdays together with Maddy Barber.

Prior to joining Kiss 92FM, Johnson used to appear weekly on the radio station Hot FM 91.3's evening drive-time show, 'The Backseat', on Thursdays talking about movies. He was also a movie and music columnist for The New Paper for several years.

Johnson left Kiss 92FM in late August 2020 to pursue personal interests.

== Personal life ==
Johnson is married to a Singaporean and has two sons.
