= TVMobile =

MediaCorp TV TVMobile
- Country: Singapore
- Broadcast area: Nation-wide
- Network: MediaCorp TV
- Headquarters: Caldecott Broadcast Centre

Programming
- Picture format: 576i(SDTV) MPEG-2

Ownership
- Owner: MediaCorp

History
- Launched: 14 February 2001; 24 years ago
- Closed: 1 January 2010; 15 years ago

Links
- Website: Official website

Availability

Terrestrial
- Digital (DVB-T): Channel 37 (602 MHz)

MediaCorp TV TVMobile (Chinese: 流动电视) was a subsidiary of MediaCorp Singapore and was the first channel in the world to pioneer the use of Digital Video Broadcast (DVB) technology to deliver television programmes to commuters. Operating on 89.3 MHz, TVMobile provided the latest infotainment, entertainment programmes, and real-time news, keeping travellers informed while on the move.

TVMobile had outdoor advertising platforms at shopping mall food courts, ferries, academic institutions, taxis, and selected SBS Transit buses. Broadcasting daily from 6:00 AM to 12:00 midnight (Singapore/Hong Kong time), TVMobile provided an outdoor advertising medium that scheduled programming based on viewers' profiles and travel patterns. However, it could only be received by home viewers with a digital set-top box.

TVMobile was discontinued effective 1 January 2010.

== History ==
Mediacorp began developing the TVMobile service, known as "digital television on wheels," in 1997.

In 1999, a consumer research company conducted a survey before introducing the TVMobile service. Project Eyeball reported that similar signals had been transmitted for over three years before TVMobile was launched.

TVMobile was launched by the then Minister of Information and the Arts, Lee Yock Suan, at a ceremony held at the Bishan Bus Interchange on 14 February 2001. At the launch, Lee described it as "the coming together of two previously incompatible activities – watching television and commuting." Singapore was the first country in the world to launch a national commercial mobile digital television service. The launch followed the announcement of a similar service called Channel OOH! by Mediacorp's competitor, SPH MediaWorks, which was jointly operated by Captive Vision.

At its launch, TVMobile was jointly operated with Nera Telecommunications; Mediacorp later purchased Nera Telecommunications' 20% stake in April 2003. Along with the launch, an event was held at Ngee Ann City on 17 February to promote the service. The event was also broadcast on TVMobile through its hourly updates between 12 PM and 5 PM.

At launch, TVMobile was broadcast to over 1,500 SBS Transit buses using DVB technology through its base stations across Singapore. The buses were fitted with two monitors for single-deck buses, three monitors for double-deck buses, and eight to ten speakers inside the buses, along with an additional 89.3 MHz FM radio broadcast for the audio output of the service. It targeted a daily audience of 1.5 million, based on the estimated daily ridership of SBS buses, which was 2.5 million. Mediacorp invested S$50 million in the service. The company also considered plans to extend its services to other modes of transport, such as LRT, taxis, and ferries.

The launch of TVMobile received positive reviews from some commuters. A research executive said that TVMobile helped her "have a nicer ride," while another stated it "made commuting a more enjoyable experience," and yet another remarked that it kept "all the unwanted noises down." However, it was disliked by some commuters. One passenger requested the removal of a monitor on the SBS buses, a media consultant felt irritated, and her friends experienced headaches. Some passengers also "missed the peace of a quiet ride." Additionally, some of TVMobile's viewers were unable to follow the Chinese programmes. In an online poll by ST Interactive, 62% of respondents said it had "destroyed their peace and quiet," while a Streats poll found that 10% were "in favor" of TVMobile.

Additional transmitters were installed in early March 2001 to help address the squeaks and picture loss in most of TVMobile's coverage areas, in response to a commuter who noticed such interruptions while travelling. TVMobile also improved the quality of the images and adjusted the volume on the TV monitors. In May 2001, TVMobile reached the Suntec Fountain Food Terrace as part of an agreement between TVMobile and Suntec Food & Leisure. In December 2001, TVMobile aired SMS Love Dedications, where people could send text messages about love. The messages were broadcast on Mondays at 8 AM and 6 PM, except on 24 December, when they were only aired in the morning. In July 2002, TVMobile was reorganized as an outdoor advertising medium.

Despite the decline in the advertising market in 2003, TVMobile saw improvements in its technology, with downtime reduced to just 1%, changing the perception of advertisers. A survey conducted in July 2003 showed that TVMobile had an audience of 758,000 viewers per day, with an average viewing time of 20 minutes, based on the average bus trip time of 26 minutes. By this point, TVMobile could also be seen at locations such as Bintan Resort ferries, Nanyang Polytechnic, and Causeway Point. From August to October 2003, TVMobile aired short films created by students from Ngee Ann Polytechnic. On 5 February 2004, TVMobile began airing 27 award-winning animated shorts from Nanyang Polytechnic for six weeks. Bruce Poh of Nanyang Polytechnic stated that TVMobile is a medium "for the industry to discover the creative and talented works" of the higher education institution.

MediaCorp discontinued TVMobile upon the expiry of its agreement with SBS Transit on 1 January 2010. The company stated that the discontinuation followed a careful evaluation of the service's viability, as the resources required to operate and maintain TVMobile were substantial.

== Programmes ==
TVMobile's programmes were tailored to the public commuter, based on the average travelling time of 15 to 20 minutes, providing them with news, traffic, weather, and critical information, along with the latest programmes. Programming was divided into three dayparted slots: morning, noon, and evening. The morning slot, which began at 6:30 am, was aimed at workers and professionals with informative shows, while the noon slot targeted school children and housewives.

70% of its programming was in English, with the rest in Mandarin. However, not all Mandarin programmes carried English subtitles. It also aired programmes that had yet to be shown on Singaporean TV channels. At launch, its programming catered to the "widest possible" demographic group, including Busercise, an interactive exercise programme for bus commuters, fashion programmes such as Video Fashion and Model TV, MTV, 4D and Toto updates, and Mediacorp's productions such as Gurmit's World and Extraordinary People. TVMobile also aired the National Day Parade and the Star Search 2003 Grand Finals.

It featured re-runs and simulcasts of shows in both Mandarin and English from its sister channels, and occasionally included original content, such as shorts produced in collaboration with Nanyang Polytechnic.

== Infrastructure ==
TVMobile used a single frequency network transmission system, meaning that its broadcasts could be received without the need to retune to another frequency while the bus was moving.

The network had one main transmitting site, nine filler transmitting sites, and two transposers located island-wide. The digital signal was carried via ATM and microwave transmission mediums to the main transmitting site, before being re-transmitted to the filler sites.

TVMobile was available on SBS Transit air-conditioned buses, Bintan Resort ferries, the Tasty Corner and Delight Corner in Suntec (Carrefour), and a few SmartCab taxis. In addition, an audio simulcast of the channel was available by tuning in to 89.3 MHz on the FM band.

== Reception and feedback ==
As of 2005, TVMobile had been installed in most of SBS Transit's buses. TVMobile was an outdoor digital television station, broadcasting live news and entertainment programmes throughout the buses' operating hours. By 2006, SBS Transit was the only bus operator to have installed TVMobile in its buses.

From time to time, SBS Transit's use of TVMobile frequently attracted criticism in the Straits Times' Forum pages. Some commuters held the impression that the installation of TVMobile was the reason for increases in bus fares, despite announcements clarifying that this was not the case. There was also feedback regarding TVMobile's suitability and the repetitiveness of the programmes broadcast.

This was despite the fact that the infrastructure and equipment of TVMobile were not managed by SBS Transit, but rather by MediaCorp TV Holdings. SBS Transit buses were simply the medium on which TVMobile was installed. TVMobile also provided an additional source of revenue for SBS Transit, due to the royalties paid by MediaCorp.

== See also ==
- RoadShow is a similar system used in public buses in Hong Kong
