= Joshua Simon (radio presenter) =

Singaporean radio presenter and musician (born 1990)

- Born: 12 June 1990 (age 36); Singapore
- Education: Ngee Ann Polytechnic
- Occupations: Radio DJ; music artist

Joshua Simon (born 1990) is a radio presenter and music artist from Singapore. He currently presents the evening show on Kiss 92FM. He was previously a DJ on One FM 91.3 from 2012 to 2016.

== Biography ==
Born in Singapore, Joshua is of mixed ethnicity, having an Indian father and a Chinese mother. He studied film at Ngee Ann Polytechnic. In 2012, he joined Hot FM 91.3 (which was renamed One FM 91.3 in 2015). In 2016, he moved to Kiss 92FM, where he presents the evening show, 'Josh's Goodnight Kiss'.

Also a singer songwriter, he was one of 17 artists from around the world who sang on 20th Century Fox's official YouTubers' cover of the song 'This Is Me' from the movie The Greatest Showman, recorded at Abbey Road Studios in London in 2017. A similar collaboration with 20th Century Fox happened the following year, Simon represented Singapore in a Queen Medley recorded at Metropolis Studios, London, in a marketing effort for Bohemian Rhapsody.

In 2019, Joshua was set to give a talk at a TEDxYouth event on 29 June when he was asked by Singapore Polytechnic to remove and edit his speech's LGBTQ+ contents. In a statement released by Singapore Polytechnic, a spokesperson said that "certain parts [of the speech] relating to his sexuality might be inappropriate for the target audience." Joshua decided to withdraw from the event, refusing to censor his talk and to set a precedence for future LGBTQ+ speakers. The incident sparked controversy and intensified conversations on LGBTQ+ discrimination in Singapore due to Section 377A of the Penal Code. Simon's speech was supposed to occur on the same day as Singapore's only pride gathering, the annual Pink Dot festival, where celebrations are contained to one area of the city.

Joshua Simon released his debut album, Filthy. The 10-track record has been streamed over 150,000 times on Spotify and was hailed by local music publication, Bandwagon Asia, as "one of the best to come out of Singapore". However, his debut album failed to make any impact on the charts.

In 2020, Simon released the iridescent anthem 'All I Wanna Do' amidst the COVID-19 pandemic. "I believe this will be an exhale for every person who finds it. Recording this song has brought so much colour back into my life," said Joshua Simon. Reflecting on his past relationships, Joshua sings about his desires and fears of falling in love again. By the end of the track, he breaks this tension to find the joy he's been searching for, in himself. "This song is my attempt to turn a human moment into an emergency shot of optimism. I think we all need that right now, especially with what's going on around the world today," added Joshua. The song sports an early 2000s synth-pop sound, with deliberate callbacks in rhythmic delivery to Joshua's earliest music inspirations – Michael Jackson, Janet Jackson and Madonna.

In December the same year, he launched SG Boys, a podcast focusing on LGBT+ issues, with a journalist and a student as his co-hosts. Melanie C of the British girl group The Spice Girls and American singer Lauv were among celebrities who appeared on the programme as guests. "When you're denied a space, you're going to create your own space," Simon was quoted as saying on Reuters.
