= Mediacorp U =

Singaporean Chinese-language television channel

- Country: Singapore
- Broadcast area: Singapore; Malaysia (Johor); Indonesia (Riau Islands)
- Headquarters: Mediacorp Campus, 1 Stars Avenue, Singapore 138507

Programming
- Languages: Chinese dialects (e.g. Mandarin); Korean; Thai; English (subtitles)
- Picture format: 1080i 16:9 HDTV

Ownership
- Owner: Mediacorp
- Sister channels: 5; 8; CNA; Suria; Vasantham

History
- Launched: 6 May 2001; 25 years ago

Links
- Website: Channel U

Availability

Terrestrial
- Digital terrestrial television: UHF CH 33 570MHz DVB-T2 Channel 7 (HD)

Streaming media
- meWATCH: Available on meWATCH website or mobile app (Singapore only)

Mediacorp U (Chinese: U频道) is a Mandarin-language free-to-air terrestrial television channel in Singapore, owned by state media conglomerate Mediacorp.

The channel was first established in 2001 by SPH MediaWorks—a subsidiary of Singapore Press Holdings—as one of two new FTA channels launched by the company (alongside the English-language TVWorks, later renamed Channel i). While it eventually became competitive with MediaCorp's Channel 8 in viewership, Channel i was struggling to compete with MediaCorp's Channel 5, and the company operated at a loss.

In 2004, SPH announced an agreement to divest its television stations and free newspaper business to MediaCorp in exchange for a stake in its television and publishing businesses. As a result, MediaCorp took over Channel U on 1 January 2005, positioning it as a counterpart to Channel 8 targeting a youth and young adult audience.

Channel U broadcasts from 3:00 p.m SGT on weekdays and 10:00 a.m SGT on weekends, until 2:30 a.m SGT daily.

During its SPH MediaWorks era, it broadcast from 10:00 a.m SGT on Mondays to Saturdays and 9.30 a.m SGT on Sundays, until 2:15 a.m SGT daily.

== History ==
=== Attempt at launching an all-Chinese UHF channel by TCS ===
Shortly after the launch of Premiere 12, Singapore's first UHF channel, on channel 24 on 1 September 1995, the Television Corporation of Singapore (TCS) showed potential for launching a UHF channel of its own (Premiere 12 was under the editorial control of Singapore Television Twelve). The service would complement 8 and would carry a mixture of sports, arts and documentary programming, mirroring Premiere 12. Had TCS found viability in the project, work would start within a year. The aim of the channel was to reach out to the upmarket audience. However, there were concerns over TCS's Chinese audience being lured by Singapore CableVision, which carried no less than eight Chinese channels on its basic service, and a further three on additional packages. The plans were discarded in June 1997 due to the high cost of producing and acquiring programming, moreover, such acquired programming in Mandarin was hard to find and would imply an annual loss of SG$10 million for yearly operations.

=== Media competition/Launch of SPH Mediaworks ===
At the trade launch of SPH MediaWorks on 1 November 2000, SPH revealed the names and logos of its two channels, with the Chinese channel being named U. MediaWorks was on track to launch the channel and its English counterpart TVWorks by June 2001.

The channel started broadcasting on 6 May 2001 with a $3 million launch party, but despite the blaze of publicity the channel received in the two weeks between gaining its licence and starting broadcasts, as well as the launch broadcast that followed, ratings quickly fell behind expectations, falling from 12% on launch night to 4.7% on its second night; whereas the main news on 8 scored 16.3% and its equivalent on U, 3.9%. 8's vice president Khiew Voon Khang said that the ratings slide looked "like a street bump than Mount Everest".

Facing the possibility of low ratings, U moved the news from 9:30pm to 10pm, competing against 8's bulletin, and put the 8:30pm drama half an hour later. On 21 May, it unveiled a new line-up emulating that of Channel 8 to make it look more competitive. Man Shu Sum explained that the decision took into consideration the audience's viewing habits; such norms were common in countries like Taiwan.

From June 2001, the channel's daily lineup extended from the initial 10 hours to 14. In October, the channel surpassed Channel 8 in primetime ratings (7-11pm) for the first time (19%), whereas in all-day ratings it became the second most-watched channel in Singapore, behind Channel 8. The December revamp of Channel U's news bulletins increased its viewership base further.

=== Media merger/Under Mediacorp's management ===
Despite these successes, SPH's channels operated as a loss, with Channel i in particular struggling in competing with Mediacorp 5 for viewership and the advertising market. In September 2004, SPH MediaWorks announced an agreement to divest its television stations and free newspaper businesses to Mediacorp, in exchange for a stake of parts of Mediacorp's television and publishing businesses. While Channel i would shut down, Mediacorp would take over U on 1 January 2005, becoming a sister channel to its former competitor. To reflect the integration of U into Mediacorp's portfolio, 8 also slightly changed its name in Chinese from Dì bā bō dào (Chinese: 第八波道) to Bā píndào (Chinese: 八频道) to match that of U. In February, Mediacorp TV CEO Khiew Voon Kwang announced that the channel would not shut down.

In April 2005, U announced a new look and an overhaul to its content. It additionally revamped its news bulletin programmes; broadcasting 7pm (News Club @ 7), 9pm (News Jab @ 9) and 11pm (News World @ 11) bulletins, until 2010, when it was replaced by a one-hour delayed telecast of the 10pm Channel 8 news bulletin, News Tonight. In 2008, the channel announced that it would increase its offer for young and working adult audiences, such as a third edition of Campus Superstar, and it would also look for quality programmes from East Asia.

In 2023, Channel U introduced a new logo as part of a wider rebranding of Mediacorp's properties, dropping the teal sphere emblem that had been used since its establishment.

== Programming ==
The channel's programming consists of Chinese-language music and entertainment produced locally and imported from China, Taiwan, Hong Kong and Thailand and Korean language series provided by KBS, MBC and SBS (available dubbed and with subtitles). Channel U's programming is available subtitled in local languages on optional subtitle tracks and dual-language option (Mandarin, Korean and Thai) is available for Korean language and Thai language programs provided by One 31, Channel 3 Thailand (available dubbed and with subtitles) and GMM 25 (available with subtitles only).
