= SPH MediaWorks =

Singaporean media company

SPH MediaWorks Ltd.
- Logo of SPH MediaWorks
- Type: Private
- Industry: Entertainment
- Founded: 8 June 2000; 26 years ago
- Defunct: 1 January 2005; 21 years ago
- Fate: Merged with Mediacorp
- Successor: Mediacorp
- Headquarters: Singapore
- Products: 2 TV channels, 2 radio stations
- Parent: Singapore Press Holdings

SPH MediaWorks Ltd. (Chinese: 报业传讯; pinyin: bào yè chuán xùn) was a free-to-air terrestrial television broadcaster in Singapore that operated two television channels: Channel U and Channel i, as well as two radio stations: UFM 1003 and WKRZ 91.3FM. It merged with the city-state's long-established broadcasting company, Mediacorp, in 2004.

== History ==
=== Founding ===
On 31 March 2000, Lee Cheok Yew was appointed as the CEO of SPH MediaWorks Ltd. Man Shu Sum and some of the Mediacorp artistes joined SPH MediaWorks the former as Chief Operating Officer of Mediacorp.

The company was founded by Singapore Press Holdings on 8 June 2000 in an investment worth $50 million, and appointed local television industry veteran Lee Cheok Yew as its CEO. The new company aimed not only at the conventional radio and television businesses, but also eyed a potential interest in the online sector. The news units were created in August, in English and Chinese; training at CNN and the BBC was expected in September. By October of the same year, the company announced that five actors and actresses: Kym Ng, Bryan Wong, Darren Lim, Wang Yuqing and Guo Liang have joined their ranks. The company set plans to launch its two channels by June 2001, aiming to attract at least 30% of Singapore's television viewers. The building that would house the new company, close to the main SPH one at Genting Lane, was ready to be finished by January 2001.

In November that same year, six actors and actresses from the company's Chinese Media and Entertainment division attended training sessions in China and Taiwan, and two journalists have joined their television news division. MediaWorks also revealed the logos of the company and its two television channels to the public. The English channel was to be named TVWorks (also styled TV Works) and the Chinese channel, Channel U. The company aimed at taking over 50% of the television advertising market and conquering the local Mandarin market with over 600 hours of content a year, thanks to an agreement with Star East Holdings subsidiary Fantastic Circle, which was renamed Star-East-Works. By December, the company announced that five English-speaking actors and actresses, including local comedy star Adrian Pang, have joined their ranks. For the news service, MediaWorks poached Arnold Gay and Michelle Quah from Channel NewsAsia. Early in 2001, concerns had emerged at MediaCorp that it would have started a war between both companies.

SPH MediaWorks signed a co-operation agreement with Hong Kong's TVB from June 2002, when the contract with MediaCorp expired, but there were no plans for the two to co-produce content. The agreement enabled Channel U the right to premiere new dramas from the broadcaster. A subsequent agreement was signed with the Taiwanese channel China Television for a period of two years. MediaCorp TV consequently did not renew the contract it had with TVB in order to free more time on Channel 8 for local content.

By mid-January, it had secured $2 million in sponsorship commitments, to advertise on both channels.

=== Preparations for launch ===
At the same time as the commercial launch of MediaCorp's TVMobile, SPH MediaWorks planned to launch a similar service, Channel OOH! (OOH as in Out Of Home). The service was going to be a joint operation with Captive Vision and, like TVMobile, was aimed at buses, shops and banks.

MediaWorks had the intention of buying radio stations from the NTUC in March 2001, with the creation of a joint-venture between the two, taking over Most Music (FM 91.3) and Heart FM (100.3). The tentative name of the new company was UnionWorks and the relaunch was initially set for the end of May.

=== Launch ===
SPH MediaWorks held its launch ceremony on 20 March 2001, where it was officially announced that the two channels were to start operations in May.

Ahead of the 6 May launch date, Channel U was supposed to air promos to entice viewers to tune in to the new service. The signal was supposed to be switched on in early April, but at the time, SPH MediaWorks didn't have a licence. Related to that, the company's Chinese-language magazine You-weekly failed to hit shelves. On 26 April 2001, the Singapore Broadcasting Authority announced it has issued a Nationwide Free-To-Air Television Service Licence to SPH MediaWorks. According to the terms of the license, the company will operate two channels: Channel U and TVWorks, from May that same year. With the licence granted, Singapore now had eight free-to-air television channels available, six from MediaCorp and two from SPH MediaWorks. In connection to this, Channel U and TVWorks started their campaign to raise awareness of the new services and that, with competition, the quality of local productions would increase. An estimated 95% of Singaporean households would receive the new services. You-weekly finally hit the shelves on 4 May. The campaign, The MediaWorks Big Tune-In, involved viewers earning cash prizes if they received the services.

=== Initial ratings ===
Channel U, the first of the two channels, went live on 6 May. Despite a blaze of publicity, its launch night turned out to be a ratings failure from its launch night (12%) to its second night (4.7%), whereas the main news on Channel 8 scored 16.3% and its equivalent on Channel U, 3.9%. Channel 8's vice president Khiew Voon Khang said that the ratings slide looked "like a street bump than Mount Everest".

=== Further ventures ===
On 15 May, ahead of the launch of TVWorks, its companion magazine Works Weekly launched.

In July, SPH MediaWorks set up a joint-venture with Chinese consultancy firm Jade. The company, Jade MediaWorks, was used to produce content for the mainland Chinese terrestrial television market and both companies each held 50% of the stocks.

Ahead of the relaunch of More Music as WKRZ, SPH MediaWorks announced that it would carry at least 22 hours of syndicated MTV content per week. On 3 October 2001, SPH Radio Broadcasting Arm, a joint management between SPH Multimedia and NTUC Media was launched as SPH UnionWorks; owns, manages, and operates UFM 1003 and WKRZ 91.3FM. Both radio stations were simply re-branded and resume operations of Heart 100.3FM and More Music 91.3FM previously wholly owned by NTUC Media. More Music was given a US-style name, going under the fake callsign WKRZ, and Heart FM was renamed UFM, in a tie-in to Channel U.

=== Improved viewing figures, restructure ===
In November 2001, viewing figures cited by Singapore Press Holdings show Channel U as the second most watched television station in Singapore, That same year, 73 employees were laid off from MediaWorks, due to a restructuring exercise at TVWorks, as well as a weak advertising market.

=== Renaming ===
On 3 March 2002, SPH MediaWorks TVWorks was renamed SPH MediaWorks Channel i. In May, the ratings of its two channels were rising, whereas those of MediaCorp were on the decline.

=== Leadership changes ===
Lee resigned as CEO of SPH MediaWorks on 1 April 2003 over "serious internal differences".

SPH became the sole owner of MediaWorks effective 25 April 2003, buying shares from Lee Cheok Yew, Cheng Shoong Tat, Ang Wee Chye and Man Shu Sum for $1.24 million. The rise of both channels' ratings increased by May 2003, attracting 33.2% of the total FTA audience.

=== Explicit language controversy ===
WKRZ 91.3 was probed for including explicit language in an edition of The Morning Show on 27 July 2003. The fine, worth $15,000, involved a woman simulating an orgasm. Sex scenes were, then as now, not allowed on Singaporean media, in an attempt to prevent tensions between ethnic groups.

=== Merger of television business with Mediacorp ===
On 17 September 2004, SPH MediaWorks announced an agreement under which it would divest its television channels to Mediacorp. SPH would take a 20% stake in a new holding company, Mediacorp TV Holdings, which would consist of Channel 5, Channel 8, Channel i (subject to a review of its viability), Channel U, and TVMobile. SPH would also take a 40% stake in Mediacorp's free newspaper Today (with SPH winding down its competing Streats). The transaction was completed on 31 December 2004. Channel U was transferred to Mediacorp at this time, becoming a sister to its now-former competitor Channel 8 the next day. Channel i was shut down, as it was not considered viable in Singapore's small FTA television market.

On 25 August 2017, SPH announced that it would divest its shares from Mediacorp, which are 20 percent in Mediacorp TV and 40 percent in Mediacorp Press in a move to focus on its core media businesses. Mediacorp would thus acquire these stakes for S$18 million, resulting in both companies being full subsidiaries of Mediacorp when completed. This came after Mediacorp announced that it would end print publication of Today and shift it to a digital-only publication. The digitalisation of Today would result in 40 roles being made redundant. In addition, Mediacorp agreed not to publish any soft copy or digital format of Today similar to a hardcopy newspaper for five years. The acquisition of SPH's stakes was completed on 29 September 2017.

=== Awards and charitable activity ===
At the 2002 Promax BDA Awards, SPH MediaWorks bagged a record four gold, six silver and one bronze awards, and was touted "Asia's Most Awarded TV Station", a first for a Singaporean group.

On 4 December 2002, MediaWorks won the "Broadcaster of the Year" award at the 2002 Asia Television Awards. Channel U also bagged the "Channel of the Year" award. Despite the wins, there were concerns from MediaWorks about potential attacks from MediaCorp.

At the 2001 Asian Television Awards, SPH MediaWorks only won one award, with Channel U's The Big Challenge earning the Best Entertainment Programme award. In January 2002, SPH MediaWorks barely managed to gain spots in the English and Chinese top tens. None of TVWorks' content reached the English ranking and in the Chinese ranking, only one programme from Channel U, A Kindred Spirit, reached sixth place (week from 13–19 January).

Channel i News won the "Best News Programme" award at the Asian Television Awards on 4 December 2003.

In January 2003, Channel U organised a charity show, Ren Ci Charity Show, in support of Ren Ci Hospital, shortly after being named the Broadcaster of the Year. The charity show featured SPH MediaWorks artistes and guest performers with entertainment and physical endurance segments to encourage the public to donate to the hospital. Channel 8 moved the PSC Nite Special to the night of the show, an hour ahead of its start, causing confusion and opposite arguments between the two broadcasters. The charity raised $4.76 million, almost the double of the initially intended target of $2.5 million. A Lianhe Zaobao editorial on 17 January revealed that MediaCorp disclosed its donation to the charity and denied its anonymity, over the broadcast of advertisements for Ren Ci Hospital during PSC Nite Special, airing at the same time as the competing telethon.

== Channels ==
- Channel U

This was the second Mandarin television channel in Singapore (after channel 8), which became integrated with Mediacorp's management on 1 January 2005.

- Channel i

This was the second English television channel in Singapore. It ceased operations on 1 January 2005 when SPH Mediaworks and Mediacorp merged.

== Artists ==
=== Left for MediaCorp (Pre-Merger) ===
- Jeanette Aw
- Michelle Chong

=== Transferred to MediaCorp ===
- Adam Chen
- Michelle Chia
- Celest Chong
- Apple Hong
- Ann Kok
- Eelyn Kok
- Ezzan Lee 李之仪
- Darren Lim
- Guo Liang
- Ong Ai Leng
- Kym Ng
- Adrian Pang
- Lynn Poh 傅芳玲
- Quan Yi Fong
- Ix Shen
- Constance Song
- Bryan Wong
- Ben Yeo

=== Transferred to Singapore Press Holdings ===
- Arnold Gay – to UnionWorks Radio 91.3, subsequently Kiss 92FM and currently returned to Mediacorp since then.
- Lin Wanfei 林琬绯
- Lina Ng – to marketing, subsequently to UnionWorks UFM100.3 and returned to MediaCorp since then.
- Evelyn Tan – to circulation, subsequently resigned
- Wang Yanqing – to print, subsequently to UnionWorks UFM100.3
- Zhang Haijie – Offered a contract to MediaCorp, but chose to join UnionWorks UFM100.3 instead. Later rejoined MediaCorp's news division.
- Chew Huoy Min 周慧敏 – to print

=== On retainer ===
- Cynthia Lee – Released, and returned to her career onstage
- Pamela Oei – Released, and returned to a career in the performing arts
- Steph Song – Released, now acting in North America
- Catherine Tan

=== Not offered/Chose not to accept a contract ===
- Shaun Chen
- Bernard Tan – Acts part-time with MediaCorp while maintaining his business in the financial planning industry
- Chen Huihui – Currently runs a chain of spas; acts with MediaCorp on a per-project basis
- Benjamin Heng – project-based artiste with MediaCorp
- Ericia Lee – now with Dream Forest
- David Leong
- Li Wenhai - Acts with MediaCorp on a per-project basis
- Adrian Lim – currently the Design Director for TWG Tea.
- Cherie Lim
- Liu Qiulian 刘秋莲 - retired from showbiz
- Johnson Low
- Ann Poh
- Xavier Teo
- Darren Seah
- Dick Su
- Wang Liuyan
- Wymen Yong
- Peter Yu

=== Left (Pre-Merger) ===
- Irin Gan 颜丽蓁

== See also ==
- Broadcasting in Singapore
- Mediacorp
  - Mediacorp TV12
- Singapore Press Holdings
