= Joanne Brough =

American television producer and executive

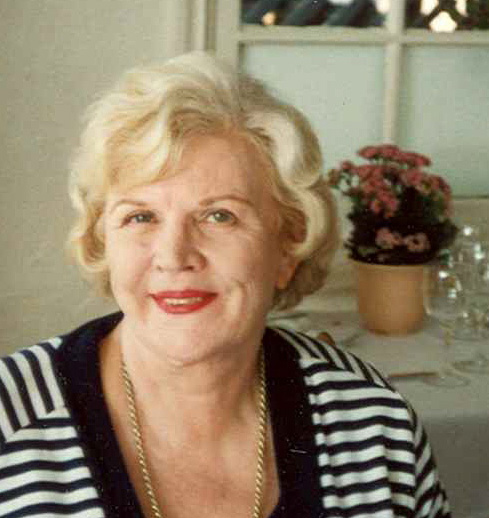
- Joanne Brough
- Born: Joanne Estelle Walker; November 4, 1927; Joplin, Missouri, U.S.
- Died: February 24, 2005 (aged 77); Joplin, Missouri, U.S.
- Occupations: Television producer, executive
- Spouse(s): Arthur Chaves (d.) (m. 1949–1957 div.); Charles Brough (d.) (m. 1968–2005)
- Children: 3

Joanne Brough (a.k.a. Joan Brough) (November 4, 1927 – 2005) was an American television producer and executive. She began her career in 1960 at KTLA, a Los Angeles television station, and went on to work for CBS Television from 1963 to 1978, rising through the ranks to become one of the first female network development executives. She oversaw and developed such hit shows as All in the Family, Kojak, Hawaii Five-O, M*A*S*H, Knots Landing, Eight Is Enough, The Waltons, Dallas, Falcon Crest, and others. From 1978 to 1986, she joined Lorimar Productions, becoming Vice President of Creative Affairs, supervising all television programs. During her tenure there, she became Executive Producer of Falcon Crest, as well as several movies for television. In 1990, she went to work for Lee Rich Productions in association with Warner Brothers, as a development executive, producing TV films and specials for three years. From 1993 to 1998, she took on the task of producing television in Singapore and Indonesia. Her later years were spent as an educator while she continued to develop new projects.

She received two Nosotros Awards and a medal from the Mexican-American Opportunity Foundation while producing the TV series Falcon Crest. She also received an award from the Dyslexia Association of Singapore for the Asian dramatic series Masters of the Sea, presented by the wife of the Prime Minister of Singapore.

== Early life ==
Joanne Brough (née Joanne Estelle Walker) was born in Joplin, Missouri, to father James Franklin Walker, an entrepreneur, real estate developer, and photographer, and mother Marion Tindall Walker (Smith), a Presbyterian deacon later in life. She grew up with her younger brother (James Franklin Walker, Jr.) at her parents’ Sagmount Hotel and Inn, a large resort in the countryside outside of Joplin. She first attended Lake Hill School, a two-room country primary/middle school where ages were mixed. Upon graduating from Joplin High School at age sixteen, she traveled to Los Angeles to attend the University of California in 1945 as an English major. She first became familiar with Southern California through yearly family road trips to Santa Monica, CA, via old Route 66. Upon the death of her father in 1947, she returned to Joplin briefly. Shortly thereafter, she accepted a job as an editor of a business newsletter The Milk News in Los Angeles. In 1949, she once again returned to Joplin where she married her first husband, Arthur R. Chaves, a Joplin native. However, they soon relocated and settled in Los Angeles, California, in 1950.

== Early career ==
Her early career paved the way to her future achievements in television production. As a young woman, she worked for Joplin radio station WMBH as a DJ spinning the 78-rpm hits of the 1940s and as host of four talk shows. Later in Los Angeles, she was hired as an assistant promotions director for Paramount TV Productions at local TV station KTLA. She also worked as a literary agent at Film Artists International and as a sub-writer on the daytime soap opera The Edge of Night under the writer Henry Slesar.

== Executive ==
In 1963, Joanne went to work for the CBS Television Network and remained there until 1978. During her initial three years at CBS, she served as a reader under her mentor, executive story editor Helen Madden, and was later promoted to executive story editor for the network in 1973. She then advanced at CBS to become a program development executive as CBS enjoyed ratings success. She worked in all areas: comedy series, drama series, movies, and miniseries. Some of the hit series included Earl Hamner’s The Waltons, Hawaii-Five-0, The Mary Tyler Moore Show, Kojak, All in the Family, and M*A*S*H.

While at CBS, she was also involved in the original development of the long-running TV series Dallas, and was consequently hired by Lorimar Television (producers of Dallas) during the first season of the show in 1978. She went on to spend eight years as Vice President Creative Affairs at Lorimar, reporting directly to the president, Lee Rich.

During this period, she supervised all of Lorimar's on-air shows and also worked in development of all new shows, including the number-one miniseries Lace, based on Shirley Conran’s best-selling novel. At the same time, she created a number of series presentations. She was closely involved in the development of many top prime-time soaps besides Dallas, such as Knots Landing, Falcon Crest, and Flamingo Road. She also supervised these programs, reading and giving notes for each draft of every script, and also for every completed episode. She viewed most dailies and attended all pilot casting sessions. One of her anecdotes during that time involved the highly rated "Who Shot J.R.?" episode of Dallas, the outcome of which was a guarded secret that she never divulged, despite pleas from family, friends, and the media.

== Producer ==
While at Lorimar, Joanne became an executive producer, overseeing at least five movies that were made for network television from 1981 through 1986.

That experience led her to take the helm as Executive Producer of the Emmy-award-winning drama Falcon Crest, starring Jane Wyman, for three seasons beginning in 1986, and later as consulting producer for one season—for a total of 106 episodes.

From 1992 to 1993, Joanne Brough executive produced Killer Rules, a murder mystery movie about the Italian Mafia in Rome, Italy, for Lee Rich Productions, Warner Brothers, and NBC.

In October 1993, she embarked on a new phase of her career at age sixty-six, traveling to Singapore under a two-year contract to establish an English drama industry there for the Singapore Broadcasting Corporation (SBC). By 1994, one year after her arrival, she had trained the writers, directors, cast, and crew well enough to be on the air with a new prime-time series she'd created, produced, and modeled after Dallas for an Asian audience―Masters of the Sea, the first English-language television drama in Asia. Then by 1995, she developed and initially produced two more series, a new one-hour police story series, Triple Nine, and a one-hour family drama series, Growing Up, both of which remained on the air till 1998 and 2001 respectively. Upon leaving Singapore in 1995, Brough noted that she had produced over 52 hours of drama in two years during her tenure in Singapore; that same effort would've taken three years in Hollywood.

With drama in Singapore well underway, she accepted a contract in 1995 from RCTI, Indonesia's number-one television network, where she took on a similar challenge, only in another language—Bahasa Indonesia. She spent several years as an expat in Jakarta, Indonesia, where the staff she trained and mentored produced Indonesia's first open-ended serialized drama, "Two Sides of the Coin." She might have remained there longer but for the political unrest of 1997–1998 that forced her to flee with her husband as rioters protested Suharto’s government and "smoke billowed from gutted buildings" near their Jakarta home.

== Educator ==
Joanne had served as a guest lecturer on television production at UCLA Extension in the 1980s. Later in 1998, upon returning from Southeast Asia, she settled in her hometown of Joplin, Missouri, having been drafted to teach courses in serialized TV drama and script writing in the Communications department at Missouri Southern State University. When asked about readjusting to small-town life, she commented that it was "just right for someone who had to escape a revolution." She spent her final years there in the company of visiting colleagues, media scholars, family, and friends.

== Personal life ==
She was married for thirty-seven years to Charles Brough, a social science researcher. She had three children from her prior marriage to Arthur Chaves (Cheryl Preston, a writer/editor; Alice Capello, a photographer; Arthur Woodson Chaves, a.k.a. Ray Woodson, a radio sportscaster/host). She also had three grandchildren (Shawna [Halsey] Guilfoyle, Acacia [Voss] May, Nicholas Chaves), two great-grandchildren (Tallulah Guilfoyle, Everett May). Joanne was a member of Mensa International and the Academy of Television Arts & Sciences.

== Filmography ==
- Hawaii Five-O (1968–80) (development executive)
- The Mary Tyler Moore Show (TV Series) (1970–77) (development executive)
- All in the Family (TV Series) (1971–79) (development executive)
- The Waltons (TV Series) (1971–81) (development executive)
- M*A*S*H (TV Series) (1972–83) (development executive)
- Kojak (TV Series) (1973–78) (development executive)
- Dallas (TV Series) (1978–91) (development executive)
- Knots Landing (TV Series) (1979–93) (executive program supervisor)
- Flamingo Road (TV Series) (1980–82) (executive program supervisor)
- Killjoy (TV Movie) (1981) (executive program supervisor)
- A Matter of Life and Death (TV Movie) (1981) (executive program supervisor)
- Mistress of Paradise (1981) (TV Movie) (executive producer)
- Our Family Business (1981) (TV Movie) (executive producer)
- Two of a Kind (TV Movie) (1982) (executive program supervisor)
- This Is Kate Bennett... (1982) (TV Movie) (executive producer)
- Washington Mistress (1982) (TV Movie) (executive producer)
- Two Marriages (1983–84) (TV Series) (executive program supervisor)
- Lace (1984) (TV Miniseries) (development executive, executive program supervisor)
- Falcon Crest (1986–89) (TV Series – 78 episodes) (executive producer)
- Falcon Crest (1989–90) (TV Series – 11 episodes) (consulting producer)
- America's Missing Children (1991) (TV Special) (supervising producer)
- Killer Rules (1992) (TV Movie) (executive producer)
- Masters of the Sea (1993–95) (TV Series - Singapore) (executive producer, creator)
- Triple Nine (1995–98) (TV Series – Singapore) (consulting producer; wrote bible)
- Asian War Chronicles (1995) (TV Series in development – Singapore) (consulting producer)
- Growing Up (1995–2001) (TV Series – Singapore) (consulting producer)
- Two Sides of the Coin (Dua Sisi Mata Uang) (1995–98) (TV Series – Indonesia) (executive producer, creator)

== Other external links ==
- Joanne Brough at IMDb
- Joanne Brough at Falcon Crest fan website
