= John Klass =

John Klass is a Singaporean, singer, producer and songwriter.

== Education ==
Klass studied at Saint Patrick's School.

== Career ==
=== Singing ===
Klass was the singer of the group Kick!, along with keyboardist Dinesh Bhatia and guitarist Jai. The group won awards for Best Local Group! & Best local song “Jane” in the 1994 Radio Music Awards.

As a soloist, Klass wrote and produced the soundtrack of The Teenage Textbook Movie. He scored a string of No.1 songs on the airplay charts across Singapore including an update of the Abba song "Honey Honey", a duet with a TV actress, Jamie Yeo.

In 1995, Klass acted in Singapore's first English drama series Masters Of The Sea, produced by Television Corporation of Singapore.

In 1997, he represented Singapore to sing in the ASEAN Song Festival.

In 1998, Klass wrote three songs for the Singaporean film The Teenage Textbook Movie.

In 2000, Klass won Best Local Song ("Falling in Love") at the Radio Music Awards.

In 2002, Klass released a single, "Believing in Fergie’s Fighters", as a tribute to Manchester United, an English football club, and its manager, Alex Ferguson. Ferguson later sent Klass a letter thanking him for the song.

In 2003, Klass was commissioned by Red Cross Society to write/produce a national tribute song to the doctors and nurses who put their own lives on the line to save the lives of the sufferers of the SARS virus. The song “Thru Your Eyes” went triple platinum in Singapore and was featured on the BBC World Service and ITV news. Money collected from the CD sales went to the families who lost loved ones to SARS.

Klass was also a producer and present with the Singapore branch of the radio station Rediffusion.

Klass has starred in many television programmes & hosted the kids, entertainment pop TV show OK! He also wrote all the original songs for 2 seasons of Kids Pop Show OK! then went on to write, sing & produce over 200 kids' songs for the kids' TV show “In Our House”.

In 2012, Klass's band, The Professionals, performed in Cannes, France, where the band received raves for their performance.

Klass was also the creative and musical director for 'The Singapore Showcase' at Marché International du Disque et de l'Édition Musicale in Cannes, France.

In May 2013, Klass was invited to helm the evening drive time belt on Kiss 92FM after a 15-year break from being a radio personality. His show shot to being the number 1 evening drive time show within 3 months and has continued to be the number 1 drive time radio show in Singapore. He also helms the evening-nighttime belt during Weekends on Kiss 92.

Due to his popularity on Kiss 92, Klass was invited by International Radio Festival to represent Singapore in Zurich in 2014. He broadcast his live radio show there for a week.

In 2014, Klass released a new single, "The Point".

In September 2017, he left Kiss 92 to join Mediacorp on Class 95. Klass also collaborated with Piccadilly Tailors to launch a fashion line specialising in bespoke suits called John Klass Suits.

In Nov 2017, Klass had his first sold-out, solo concert at Esplanade Recital Studio. His band, Kick!, made a guest appearance.

In Jan 2018, Klass was a guest performer at 007 in concert, to celebrate and commemorate 50 years of James Bond movies. Klass was backed by a 28-piece orchestra and band from London and Singapore. This concert took place at the MasterCard Theatres at Marina Bay Sands.

In February 2019, Klass took charge of the all-new Love Songs on Class 95, from 8 pm to midnight. His nightly segment was "The Love Life Forum".

In June 2023, Klass started his "Evening Drive Time Show" on Gold 905, for evening commuters. Then two years later in June 2025, Klass left Gold 905FM to focus on his music career. He is actively posting on his Facebook Account and is offering limited slots for one on one voice training to individuals who are aspiring to be radio hosts, voice artists, podcasters, or just want to speak with more impact.

== Personal life ==
Klass is married to Valerie and both have a daughter.

== Discography ==
With Kick!

- Freedom in Me
- Jane
- Chains of Pain
- Its now or Never

As soloist

- Falling in Love
- When things seem so wrong
- Honey Honey
- Believing in Fergie's Fighters
- Shame Shame Shame
- Funk it Up
- Heaven Knows
- Sins
- Under the Moon
- Citizens
- The Point
- I Just Fall In Love Again
- Christmas In My Mind
