= Steven David Lim =

Singaporean actor (born 1974)

- Born: 4 September 1974 (age 52); Malaysia
- Education: Raffles Institution
- Occupations: Actor; photographer; businessman
- Years active: 1996−present
- Website: www.stevendavidlim.com

Steven David Lim (born 4 September 1973), also known as Steven Lim, is a Singaporean actor, photographer, and restaurateur best known for his role as David Tay in the long-running drama series Growing Up on MediaCorp TV Channel 5. He is of Peranakan origin.

== Career ==
=== Acting career ===
Lim gained prominence for his role in Growing Up, where he appeared in all six seasons of the show. In 1998, Lim appeared in the Malay drama series Soldadu as National Service member Su Kiong and appeared speaking in Malay. His command of Malay in the drama improved during the drama's five-episode run. He reprised his role in the second season in 2000.

In 1998, Lim made his film debut in Forever Fever. In the same year, he starred in The Teenage Textbook Movie.

In 2001, Lim left Singapore to attend London Academy of Music and Dramatic Art in England. After completing his drama school education, he took on acting jobs over the years in the United Kingdom. He played the lead role in the 2005 feature film Cut Sleeve Boys, and made a guest appearance on the British sketch comedy series Little Britain.

In 2013, Lim left the United Kingdom for Bangkok, Thailand, Lim continued with acting.

Additionally, he took on supporting roles in the gay web series People Like Us and Getaway. For his performance in People Like Us, Lim was honored with the Best Supporting Actor award at the 2017 Indie Series Awards.

In 2023, Lim opened up about the bullying he endured on the set of Growing Up, after becoming the target of a co-star's animosity. Lim suspects the co-star tried to get him fired at the end of the first season. Although he refrains from naming the co-star, he praises co-star Jamie Yeo for rallying behind him.

=== Other career ===
After moving to Bangkok, Lim opened a cafe, Luka Bangkok, and a restaurant, Luka/Quince at Siri House. He also took on photography.

== Filmography ==
=== TV series ===
Year	Title	Role	Notes	Ref
1996 – 2001	Growing Up	David Tay		
1998-2000	Soldadu	Su Kiong		
2016	People Like Us			
2022	Getaway	Sam's dad	Web series	

=== Film ===
Year	Title	Role	Notes	Ref
1998	Forever Fever	Boon		
1998	The Teenage Textbook Movie	Daniel Boon		
2005	Cut Sleeve Boys	Melvin Shu		
2025	The Client	Richard	Short film	

== Personal life ==
Lim spent his childhood and early teenage years in Kuala Lumpur until he moved to Singapore at age 15. Taking Malay as the second language instead of Mandarin, he excelled in the O- and A-level examinations. His Malay worsened when he studied at the National University of Singapore.

During season 2 of Growing Up, Lim successfully applied for Singapore permanent residence status and was enlisted to National Service.

He speaks in English, Malay, and Hokkien and Teochew dialects.

In 2019, Lim came out publicly on Dear Straight People, becoming one of Singapore's first openly gay actors.
