= Amy Cheng =

Singaporean actress (born 1970)

- Born: 1970 (age 55–56); Singapore
- Other name: Zheng Huaru
- Occupations: Actress; creative director
- Spouse: Rama Chandran (m. 2005)
- Children: 2

Chinese name
- Traditional Chinese: 鄭 华 如
- Simplified Chinese: 郑 华 如
- Hanyu Pinyin: Zhèng Huaru

Amy J. Cheng (born 1970) is a Singaporean actress and creative director of ACT 3 Theatrics. She is best known for her role as Karen Tay in the television series Growing Up and as Jacqueline Ling in the 2018 romantic comedy-drama Crazy Rich Asians.

== Career ==
=== Stage ===
Cheng is a co-founder and creative director of Act 3 Theatrics. She has performed in live theatre shows through Act 3 including Footsteps in the Night, 41 Hours, and Confessions of the Three Unmarried Women. She has had other stage roles in Singapore Repertory Theatre's Forbidden City and The Good Citizen and Escape Productions' The Deap Blue Sea and Esplanade's Letters from Home. In 2006 she was nominated for Best Supporting Actress at the Life! Theatre Awards for her role as the Banana Tree Spirit in the mandarin musical 10 Brothers.

In 2012, Cheng become Act 3 Theatrics' creative director.

=== Television ===
From 1996 until 2001 Cheng was a regular cast member of the Singaporean television drama Growing Up (1996 - 2001) as Karen Tay, the wife of Andrew Seow's character, Gary Tay. In 2001 she was nominated for Best Actress at the Asian Television Awards for her role in Growing Up. She played Dr. Winnie Leong in the television series First Touch (2002 - 2003) and also had roles in Like My Own, Happily Ever After (2007), Machine, Stay, and Anita's Complaint. Cheng has worked as a television presenter and host for My Perfect Child and The Good Life. She landed roles in the Chinese dramas She's the One, Destiny, and Making Miracles (2007). She had a guest role in the German television movie Perfect Harmony. She played the leading role in Zhao Wei Films' Stories About Love and starred alongside Gurmit Singh and Fann Wong in Jack Neo's movie named Just Follow Law (2007). She had a small role as Felicia Chin's mother in the television movie Hong Bao + Kisses.

=== Film ===
In 2018 she appeared in the American romantic comedy-drama film Crazy Rich Asians as Jaqueline Ling.

== Personal life ==
In 2000, Cheng met Rama Chandran in a children’s production, Foot Steps In The Night. They started a relationship in 2002 and married in 2005. They have 2 sons.

== Filmography ==
=== Theatre ===
Year	Title	Role	Notes	Ref.
2006	10 Brothers			

=== Television series ===
Year	Title	Role	Notes	Ref.
1996–2001	Growing Up	Karen Tay		
1998-1999	Triple Nine	Inspector Emily Cheng		
2000	Stories About Love			
2002–2003	First Touch			
2003	Always On My Mind	Surin	4 episodes	
2005	Destiny	Shen Qianwen		
2009	Polo Boys	Alan's mother	1 episode	
2010	Silver Lining	Margaret Gan	2 episodes	
2010	With You	Kang Yafang	3 episodes	
2015	2025	Renee Tang	16 episodes	
2016	Rojak	Ling	1 episode	
2017	When Duty Calls	Tina	Cameo	
2018	20 Days		4 episodes	

=== Film ===
Year	Title	Role	Notes	Ref.
2003	No Place Like Home - Colors	Beatrice	Television movie	
2005	House of Harmony	Mrs. Wah	Television movie	
2007	Just Follow Law	Nancy		
2011	The Man from Beijing	Qui Hong	Television movie	
2018	Crazy Rich Asians	Jacqueline Ling		
2019	Reposession	Linda		
