= A New Life (Singaporean TV series) =

- 有福
- Genre: Family
- Written by: Ang Eng Tee
- Directed by: Lai Lee Thin; Fang Jiafu; Li Meifeng
- Starring: Christopher Lee; Yvonne Lim; Darren Lim; Andrew Seow; Carole Lin; Ann Kok; Jin Yinji; Hossan Leong; Eelyn Kok; Alan Tern; May Phua; Yan Bingliang; Timothy Nga
- Opening theme: "明天的幸福" by Ocean Ou
- Ending theme: "满天星" by Ocean Ou
- Country of origin: Singapore
- Original language: Chinese
- No. of episodes: 20

Production
- Producer: Soh Bee Lian 苏美莲
- Running time: approx. 45 minutes

Original release
- Network: MediaCorp Channel 8
- Release: 13 June – 8 July 2005

A New Life (Chinese: 有福; pinyin: Yǒu Fú) is a 2005 Singaporean drama series which started airing on 13 June 2005. The series, in collaboration with National Kidney Foundation Singapore (NKF) Cancer Fund, revolves around the life of You Fu, an ordinary blue-collar worker. who helps his friends while facing his personal challenges and difficulties in his life. It also depicted how cancer affects daily life and overcoming the obstacles involved. It starred Christopher Lee and Yvonne Lim.

== Plot ==
Zhang Youfu is a blue-collar worker who stopped schooling at Secondary 2 at the age of 14 years old to join the workforce by helping his father Zhang Wancai in the curry chicken business. He had tried working out on different jobs from different industries including a durian seller, a handmade fishball noodles seller and a massage service assistant after he completed his national service either, but unfortunately, they were all failed attempts and he ultimately returned to cooking curry chicken at funerals. However, as he is slow-witted and clumsy, his former employers find his work performance wanting and thinking that he's beyond hope. However, he is optimistic by nature and does not hold a grudge. Following the death of his father due to throat cancer caused by heavy smoking, the heavy burden of supporting his entire family consisting of his mothe, his elder sister Zhang Zhenzhu and his elder brother Zhang Hongyun falls squarely on his shoulder.

One of Zhang's army friends, Steven, was diagnosed with brain cancer and eventually died from it. Steven's wife, Xiuxiu, borrowed from loan sharks to pay the medical bills from the hospital for his treatment. In order to help Xiuxiu, Zhang becomes an illegal hawker to help Xiuxiu earn enough to pay back the loan sharks.

Another of Zhang's army friends, Lin Laifa, was introduced by another army friend, Ah Gen, to Ah Mei from Indonesia. Lin and Ah Mei eventually married but after marriage, Ah Mei is diagnosed with breast cancer. Lin then enlists Zhang and Ah Gen to send Ah Mei back to her family in Indonesia. While in Indonesia, Ah Mei's father got Zhang to bring Ah Mei back to Singapore instead. Ah Mei and Lin divorced thereafter and Ah Mei was evicted from Lin's house. Ah Mei become homeless and subsequently attempted suicide due to her illness. Zhang took her in and Ah Mei helped with the housework. She also studied English to take the Singapore-Cambridge GCE Ordinary Level examination for the English Subjecy which impresses Zhang.

Zhang has a girlfriend, Guo Jialing, and hangs out very frequently at her family's retail shop, where he becomes close with Jialing's elder sister, Guo Jiayi. He would also bring Jialing's father out to the park very frequently and learn to play erhu from him. Zhang eventually helps Jialing's father to stop drinking alcohol and fighting after he got drunk. Zhang eventually mastered the erhu which Jialing's father practise his martial arts to Zhang's tune.

Jialing works at a travel agency and her manager, Michael, took an interest in her. During a dinner among the three of them, Jialing gave Zhang an English name and lied that he is of a management level in the construction sector. Zhang eventually told Michael his true profession and Michael insisted that Jialing should break off with Zhang and be with him instead. Jialing was disappointed with Zhang not carrying on the lies she made and broke off their relationship, maintaining as friends. Jialing eventually married Michael. Jialing later realised that Michael is a scheming person and also a womaniser. They later divorced with Jialing marrying the divorce lawyer, Thomas, who helped her in the divorce. After returning from her honeymoon, Jialing visited Zhang at his new hawker stall selling curry chicken ramen and confessed she preferred her previous life before her marriages and decided to get a divorce with Thomas. Feeling that friends will always help each other while married couples quarrel with each other, Jialing prefers to stay as good friends with Zhang.

Ah Mei's breast cancer went into remission after she went for chemotherapy with Zhang paying all her medical bills by working part-time as a taxi driver and a petrol station attendant. Lin is then diagnosed with lung cancer and died. Zhang's mother died from injuries and old age. Free from multiple obligations to his friends, Zhang left all his part-time jobs and set up Hock Woon curry chicken ramen stall, named after himself and his brother. With a successful stall, Zhang donated S$50,000 to NKF's cancer fund on behalf of his business and later married Ah Mei.

== Cast ==
- Christopher Lee as Zhang Youfu
- Yvonne Lim as Ah Mei
- Darren Lim as Lin Laifa
- Andrew Seow as Zhang Hongyun, Youfu's elder brother
- Carole Lin as Zhang Zhenzhu, Youfu's elder sister
- Ann Kok as Guo Jialing
- Jin Yinji as Youfu's mother
- Hossan Leong as Ah Gen
- Eelyn Kok as Qiurong
- Alan Tern as Ah Ler
- May Phua as Xiuxiu
- Yan Bingliang as Zhang Dongcai, later renamed Zhang Wancai, a.k.a. Curry Cai, Youfu's father
- Timothy Nga as Michael
- Margaret Lee as Xiaoyan
- Melody Chen as Ah Hua
- Cheryl Desiree Chan as Laifa's younger sister
- Lee Weng Kee as Jialing's father
- Justina Low as Guo Jiayi, Jialing's elder sister
- Seth Ang as Steven
- Sharon Wong as Michael's girlfriend and wife
- Luis Lim Yong Kun as Ah Xing
- Remus Teng as Richard
- Benjamin Yeung Sheung Bun as Alex
- Chua Lee Lian as Herself (Creator, Storyteller and Narrator of this series)

== Accolades ==
Year	Award	Category	Nominees	Result	Ref.
Star Awards	2005	Best Actor	Christopher Lee	Nominated	
Star Awards	2005	Best Actress	Yvonne Lim	Nominated	
Star Awards	2005	Best Supporting Actor	Darren Lim	Nominated	
Star Awards	2005	Best Supporting Actor	Andrew Seow	Nominated	
Star Awards	2005	Best Drama Serial	—N/a	Won	
Star Awards	2005	Best Theme Song	"明天的幸福" by Ocean Ou	Won	

Preceded by A Child's Hope (season 2); 2004	Star Awards for Best Drama Serial; A New Life; 2005	Succeeded by The Shining Star; 2006
