= Masters of the Sea =

Masters of the Sea may refer to:

- Masters of the Sea (film), a 1922 Austrian film directed by Alexander Korda
- Masters of the Sea (TV series), a 1994 Singapore television drama series

== See also ==
- Master of the Sea, an episode of Ninjago
