= Man at Forty =

- 跑吧!男人
- Starring: Zoe Tay; Edmund Chen; Phyllis Quek; Chen Hanwei
- Opening theme: 男人四十 by Jeff Wang
- Country of origin: Singapore
- Original language: Chinese

Original release
- Network: MediaCorp TV Channel 8
- Release: 2004

Man At Forty (Chinese: 跑吧!男人) was a Singaporean television drama series that revolved around a pair of brothers, one born with a silver spoon and the other having to live in poverty almost all his life, and how their lives were thrown into a roller-coaster ride by a sudden change in wealth and status. Things grew more complicated as jealousy, complacency, resentment, hatred and disillusion set in. This series was broadcast in 2004.

== Plot ==
The series revolves around two half brothers born to a rich man. Chen Long Wei, the legitimate son, is arrogant and does not see the need to work hard for his future while his half brother, Long Hui, is an illegitimate child who lives with his mother without all the privileges that Long Wei has since birth.

The Chen family has been running the famous 'Kang Ji' traditional bun business for three generation. Because of Long Wei's attitude in life, his father is worried that he will destroy the family business should he inherit it thus he bequeathed his business to Long Hui instead. Unable to deal with the fact that his father did not pass on the business to him, Long Wei sells his shares to the business and continues to lead a spendthrift and aimless life.

Fear of losing his girlfriend, Tian Tian, Long Wei decides to pull himself together and prove to her that he can be a man of achievements. However, the jealous Long Hui steps in to destroy Long Wei's confidence. Dejected, Long Wei reverts to his old ways. Fortunately, Long Wei has two good friends; Tang Tang and Jian Jie who never give up on him. In fact, it is Jian Jie, a simple woman with a sad past who eventually persuaded Long Wei to turn over a new leaf and learn the skill to make buns so that he can start afresh.

Long Hui with his newfound wealth begins to become obnoxious, arrogant and takes on the same path that Long Wei has gone through. Losing enthusiasm for work, his business suffers and the shop is taken over by the bank. But then they both realized that they should forgive each other cause it is also for the sake of their father and their family.

== Cast ==
- Zoe Tay - Jian Jie
- Edmund Chen - Chen Longwei
- Phyllis Quek - Xiao Tian Tian
- Chen Hanwei - Chen Longhui
- Andrew Seow - Tang Tang
- Carole Lin - Fried Chicken
- Chen Tianwen - Wang Shaoqi
- Richard Low - Bao Qingtian
- Jin Yinji - Jian Jie's mother
- Li Yinzhu - Wang Bi-er
- Chen Shucheng - Chen Yaozu
- Joey Swee - Lucy
- Brandon Wong - Ah Wei

== Accolades ==
Organisation	Year	Category	Nominee	Result	Ref
Star Awards	2004	Best Actor	Edmund Chen	Nominated	
Star Awards	2004	Best Supporting Actor	Andrew Seow	Won	
