= S11 (film) =

- Directed by: Gilbert Chan; Joshua Chiang
- Written by: Gilbert Chan; Joshua Chiang
- Produced by: Gilbert Chan
- Starring: Timothy Nga; Kevin Murphy; Cindy Teo
- Cinematography: Victor Nah
- Edited by: Joshua Chiang
- Music by: Terence Khng; Timothy Ngoh
- Production company: Singapore Film Commission
- Release date: 3 August 2006
- Running time: 100 minutes
- Country: Singapore
- Languages: Mandarin; Cantonese; Hokkien; English
- Budget: $100,000

S11 is a 2006 Singaporean black comedy film directed by Gilbert Chan and Joshua Chiang, starring Timothy Nga, Kevin Murphy and Cindy Teo.

== Cast ==
- Timothy Nga as Terence
- Kevin Murphy as Ben
- Cindy Teo as Michelle
- Frank Chaar as Gold Hair
- Steven Yun as Old Beng

== Release ==
The film opened in theatres on 3 August 2006.

== Reception ==
My Paper rated the film 3 stars out of 5.

Tan Dawn Wei of The Straits Times rated the film 2 stars out of 5 and wrote that the film is "let down by clumsy execution, bad sound and uneven cinematography which render the film a very school-project feel."

Felix Cheong of Today gave the film a score of 1/5, and wrote that the film is "so pedestrian that you could probably have paved a road with its pages". Cheong also wrote that the film is "marred by low production values" and criticised the performances.
