= Andrew Seow =

Singaporean actor

- Born: 1969 or 1970 (age 55–56); Singapore
- Other name: Xiao Yiming
- Education: St. Patrick's School; Catholic High School
- Alma mater: Lasalle College of the Arts
- Occupations: Actor; model
- Years active: 1995−2007
- Musical career
- Formerly of: The Dragons Five

Chinese name
- Traditional Chinese: 蕭乙銘
- Simplified Chinese: 萧乙铭
- Hanyu Pinyin: Xiāo Yǐmíng

Andrew Seow (born 1969 or 1970) is a Singaporean former actor and model.

== Early life ==
Seow studied at St. Patrick's School and Catholic High School. He earned an Advanced Diploma in fashion design, jewellery design and merchandising from Lasalle-SIA College of the Arts.

== Career ==
Seow was a model in Singapore and in other parts of Asia before becoming an actor on local television. He is best known for his role as the fiery tempered eldest son Gary Tay in the long-running drama series Growing Up on MediaCorp TV Channel 5, a role which earned him the Best Newcomer in the annual Asian Television Awards in 1996. Seow has also starred in numerous Chinese-language dramas on Channel 8, garnering nominations in the annual Star Awards.

Seow was talent-spotted by a Television Corporation of Singapore (TCS) producer in 1996 and subsequently joined TCS. In the mid-90s, Seow, Jason Oh, Thomas Ong, Raymond Yong and Henry Tee formed the boy group The Dragons Five, which was named after the Channel 8 series of the same title.

Since 2010, Seow has been a Senior Curator with Tsu Ho Gallery which specializes in fine art, antiques and jewellery.

In 2025, Seow was working as an auxiliary police officer with security firm Aetos.

== Filmography ==
=== Television series ===
Year	Work	Role	Notes	Ref
1995	Sparks Of Life 生命火花			
1995	The Dragons Five 飞龙五将			
1996	Unbroken Cycle 解连环			
1996-1997	Triple Nine		2 seasons	
1996-2001	Growing Up	Gary Tay	6 seasons	
1999	Shiver			
1999	Dreamers (Wheels)			
1999	Can I Help You		Sitcom	
2001	The Hotel			
2001	My Genie 我爱精灵			
2003	Love Is Beautiful 美丽家庭			
2003	My Genie 2 我爱精灵 II			
2004	Man at Forty	Tang Tang		
2004	Spice Siblings			
2004	A Child's Hope II			
2004	The Ties That Bind 家财万贯			
2005	My Lucky Charm			
2005	Zero to Hero			
2005	A New Life			
2006	The Undisclosed			

== Theatre ==
- Close: In Your Face by The Necessary Stage (2002)

== Awards and nominations ==
Organisation	Year	Category	Nominated work	Result	Ref
Asian Television Awards	1996	Best Newcomer in a Drama Series	Growing Up (as Gary Tay)	Won	
Star Awards	2004	Best Supporting Actor	Man at Forty (as Tang Tang)	Won	
