= Otto Fong =

Otto Fong Yong Chin (born 1968) is a Singaporean comic artist, playwright and teacher.

== Early life and education ==
Fong was born in Johor Bahru in 1968. His father was trade unionist and politician Fong Swee Suan and his mother is former trade unionist Chen Poh Cheng. He has a brother and a sister. He studied at The Chinese High School and later Hwa Chong Junior College. He studied engineering at the Oklahoma State University in the United States and took up a two-year diploma course in film directing at the Beijing Film Academy in 1994.

== Career ==
Fong wrote several plays, including We Are Family, Cetacea, Another Tribe, and HERStory.

After studying in Beijing, Fong returned to Singapore in 1997 and worked as a video editor and graphics artist for a year. His first comic book, Buddy Buddy, was published by the China Friendship Publishing Company in 1998. In 1999, he became a science teacher at Raffles Institution. He wrote a musical, Mr. Beng, which was staged at the Singapore Arts Festival in 1999. His second comic book, Sir Fong, was published in 2005. The book was positively reviewed by Prudencio Miel of The Straits Times. The second installment in the Sir Fong series, Sir Fong 2: Fur-o-cious, was published in 2007, and was again positively reviewed by Miel. He left Raffles Institution at the end of 2007.

Fong has also created the TV series Totally Totto. The third installment in the series, Sir Fong's Adventures In Science, was published in 2008. The sixth installment in the series, Sir Fong's Adventures In Science Book 6: Synthetic Biology, was published in 2017.

Fong currently teaches in Anglo Singapore International School Sukhumvit 64 Thailand.

In 2022, Fong made his acting debut, starring as Uncle Alex in Getaway, known for being Singapore's first Boys Love web series.

== Personal life ==
Fong is openly gay and lives with his partner. He came out as gay in a 2,000 word-blog entry in 2007, and was asked by the government to take down the entry as the blog was also read by students.

In a speech, Prime Minister Lee Hsien Loong used Fong's case to state that "Singapore should strive to maintain a balance, to uphold a stable society with traditional heterosexual family values, but with space for homosexuals to live their lives and to contribute to society."
