= Saint Patrick's School, Singapore =

Catholic all-boys school in Singapore

Coordinates: 1.3085685°N 103.9164752°E

St. Patrick's School
- 圣伯特理中学校; Sekolah St. Patrick

Location
- 490 East Coast Road, Singapore 429058

Information
- Type: All-Boys; Government-Aided
- Motto: Potest Qui Vult (He Who Wills, Can)
- Religious affiliation: Roman Catholic
- Established: 1933; 93 years ago
- Session: Single session
- School code: 7022
- Principal: Aloysius Ting Poh Leong
- Enrolment: 1294
- Colour: Blue Green White
- Website: www.stpatricks.moe.edu.sg

Saint Patrick's School is a government-aided Roman Catholic Lasallian all-boys' secondary school located along East Coast Road, Singapore. It is more commonly referred to as St Pat's. Students and alumni refer to themselves as Patricians or Sons of St. Patrick's.

St Patrick's is one of seven Lasallian schools in Singapore. It is one of the oldest schools in the East Region of Singapore, and is richly steeped in war history as well as Irish and Roman Catholic heritage. It is affiliated to Catholic Junior College, De La Salle School, St Joseph's Institution (Junior), St Stephen's School and St Anthony's Primary School.

== History ==
=== Founding and inception ===
St Patrick's was founded on 16 January 1933 by Bro Stephen Buckley, a Lasallian brother and missionary hailing from County Cork, Ireland.

The school was built on a plot of land along East Coast Road which another Lasallian, Bro Gregory McGrath had purchased in 1898, at a cost of $1,100. The Katong property originally contained just a single attap house, which the Brothers of St Joseph's Institution had intended to use as a coastal seaside resort away from its former campus along Bras Basah Road.

On 17 October 1928, the colonial government announced their plans to fill in the swamps in the Siglap region and turn the area into a residental estate. This prompted Bro Stephen Buckley to begin drawing up plans for the Katong resort to be converted into a school.

The first mention ever made to the idea of St Patrick's School was in a letter by Bro Stephen Buckley to his superior in Belgium, dated 19 October 1928:

"I believe that if we had a school [in Katong] many of the parents of our Catholic boys would go to live there. It is an ideal place for the Boarding Department. The only draw back is the distance from Church. If we were in a position to have our own chaplain there would be no other difficulty."

Bro Stephen Buckley commissioned Irish architect Denis Santry to construct the new campus at an estimated cost of $386,214 in the early 1930s. Santry was also credited with designing the Sultan Mosque and Singapore War Memorial. By his design, the original campus consisted of three main buildings. There were two parallel three-story blocks—one containing the classrooms and the other serving as the Brothers' residence. They were joined by a central block which housed the Chapel and the school library.

Construction of the St Patrick's campus commenced in April 1931 and was completed on 15 August 1932. Hence, on 16 January 1933, St Patrick's opened its doors for the first time to a fledgling cohort of 245 students. In its early days, owing to its status as a Catholic school and offshoot of St Joseph's Institution, it was noted that the school mostly drew students from middle-income Christian Eurasian and Chinese backgrounds, although it nonetheless welcomed students of all socio-economic backgrounds and ethnicities.

=== Early history (1933-1941) ===
During its early years, St Patrick's School excelled in sports such as tennis, hockey and swimming. The St Patrick's School Cadet Corps and "Open" Scouts Troupe were also founded in 1936 and 1941 respectively.

Notably, in the year 1938, St Patrick's School emerged as Singapore's top school based on the Cambridge national examination results for that year. In accomplishing this academic feat, St Patrick's had trumped several of the island's more established institutions, such as St Joseph's Institution and Raffles Institution.

=== World War II (1941-1945) ===
==== British and Australian control ====
In 1941, whilst World War II was ongoing in the European Theatre, the British colonial administration issued notice to the school that it was likely to be taken over by the military. Consequently, the Brothers arranged for all of St Patrick's upper-form students to be transferred to St Joseph's Institution, and all the lower-form students to be transferred to Telok Kurau English School.

When World War II ultimately broke out in the Pacific Theatre, the British took over the campus and converted it into a military hospital for combatants injured during the Malayan Campaign. During this time, the compound was primarily administered by the 13th General Hospital of the Australian Army Medical Corps, under the charge of Colonel Douglas Pigdon.

==== Japanese control ====
After the British surrender on 15 February 1942, the Japanese took over the school and used it as an administrative building instead. While it was under Japanese command, St Patrick's was occupied by various Japanese military units—most notably the Japanese Air Force, who designated St Patrick's as the Air Force Headquarters No. 3 under the charge of Lt. Gen Michio Sugahara.

The Japanese also re-purposed the school's various facilities to suit their needs. The Chapel served as the officers' mess, whereas the library became a hub for wireless communications. They also carried out notable renovation works on the premises, such as constructing two more lasting buildings—one of which would ultimately become the school's laboratory building.

===== Temporary relocation to Telok Kurau English School =====
On 1 April 1942, the Japanese military administration ordered that all schools be re-opened, with Japanese as the new medium of instruction. Moreover, as part of their attempt to erase the religious heritage of Singapore's Catholic institutions, the Japanese required that St Patrick's School be renamed to East Coast Road Boys' School. With its original campus occupied by the Japanese armed forces, St Patrick's continued most of its operations at the campus of Telok Kurau English School during the Japanese rule.

==== Japanese surrender ====
After the Japanese surrender on 15 September 1945, St Patrick's changed hands once again, from the Japanese to the Allies. Shortly after the surrender, St Patrick's had the distinction of being personally visited by the Supreme Commander of the Allied Forces in Southeast Asia, Lord Louis Mountbatten.

However, against the protests of Bro Canice Brennan, the school compound continued to remain in the hands of the British and Australian forces for a period of time. Hence, when St Patrick's School opened its doors again under its original name on 1 October 1945, it still remained at the Telok Kurau campus. It was only a year later on 7 October 1946 that St Patrick's School was returned to the Lasallian Brothers, and its students and staff were finally able to return to the original campus along East Coast Road.

=== Post-WWII (1945-1950) ===
In 1947, Bro Alban Rozario also became the first Singaporean director of St Patrick's School. Many of the symbols of the modern Patrician identity can be credited to Bro Alban's works during his five years as the principal of St Patrick's.

==== Patrician symbols ====
Before the war, St Patrick's had housed a marian sculpture known as Our Lady of Katong. During the Occupation, the Japanese had discarded the statue. However, after the war, it was recovered from a scrapyard in Pasir Panjang and returned to the school. Hence, Bro Alban commissioned a young Irish artist, Bro Joseph McNally—who would later become a St Patrick's principal himself—to restore the statue.

Bro Alban Rozario can also be credited with having devised the school's Latin motto, "Potest Qui Vult", meaning "He who wills, can". This motto remains in use till today.

The St Patrick's School Old Boys' Association was also formed in May 1949.

==== Academic and co-curricular performance post-WWII ====
The years immediately after the war would see the founding of the Pajigwad Scout Troop, which was pioneered by Bro Canice Brennan and Bro Alban Rozario in 1946.

St Patrick's also continued to demonstrate stellar academic performance in its post-war years, producing Singapore's best Cambridge examination results in 1946, 1947 and 1948. It was only in 1949 that St Patrick's was finally beaten by Raffles Institution.

=== Late-20th century (1950-1999) ===
The latter half of the 20th century continued to see many new developments for St Patrick's.

==== 1950s ====
As of 1954, the St Patrick's campus housed both primary and secondary students, which led to considerable overcrowding on the premises. Hence, it was decided that a new primary school needed to be created to house the primary students of St Patrick's. A site near the proposed new Church of Our Lady of Perpetual Succour was identified in that same year. Negotiations were completed in 1955, and the school building was completed in 1957. This new school was named St Stephen's School, and opened its doors to students on 7 May 1957.

In 1956, Singapore's seventh President Tony Tan Keng Yam scored eight distinctions in the Cambridge examinations under St Patrick's.

==== 1960s ====
In 1969, St Patrick's opened its doors to pre-university students of both genders, thereby making it a co-educational institution.

The 1960s also saw at least four St Patrick's students attain the coveted President's Scholarship - diplomat Barry Desker, Brigadier-General Wesley D'Aranjo, Dennis Yong and Moses Lee.

1969 was a significant year for St Patrick's, as it won National Awards in Badminton, Tennis, Cricket, Judo, Athletics and Debating. St Patrick's also established 27 new school sports records within a single year.

==== 1970s ====
As early as 1971, plans had been made to phase out the pre-university track in St Patrick's, and the school finally ceased its intake of pre-university students in 1978. Hence, St Patrick's School became a purely all-boys' secondary school, and has remained as such till today.

In 1973, St Patrick's became the very first organisation to utilise Singapore's newly-completed National Stadium, for its 40th-anniversary celebrations. To commemorate this event, a school sports day was held, where the school set 17 new student athletic records within this single event.

The St Patrick's School Old Boys' Association was revived by Bro Joseph McNally in 1976, and was renamed The Patrician Society. Singaporean intelligence officer and diplomat George Edwin Bogaars served as the first president of the new Society.

== Identity and school culture ==
=== Roman Catholic tradition ===
In keeping with the school's Catholic traditions, students recite the Lasallian Invocation in the morning, and the Angelus at midday. During Easter, the Regina Coeli is recited instead. Masses are held in the School Chapel by its Resident Brothers. The school also has various Catholic societies for its students, such as the Legion of Mary. Attendance at Legion of Mary meetings is made compulsory for all Secondary One Catholic students. The school's Student Council also includes a School Catholic Activities Committee, which oversees all Catholic activities within St Patrick's.

Moreover, the school also pays homage to its two patron saints, St Patrick of Ireland and St John Baptist de La Salle.

=== School symbols ===
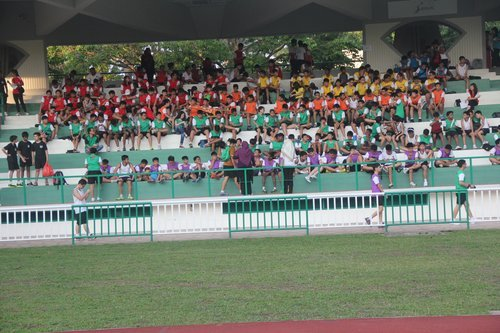
St Patrick's School annual Sports Day at Bedok Stadium. Photo taken on 22 May 2014

The shamrock is found on various items of the school uniform, including the belt, T-shirt, and uniforms. It is made up of three green heart-shaped clovers touching at their bases in the centre of the design. Two of the hearts are at the lower half with one at the upper half. The shamrock represents the school's virtues of "Humanity, Humility & Honesty". The school's patron saint, Saint Patrick, used the shamrock to represent the Holy Trinity.

=== School uniform ===
In 2021, the school engaged designer Daniel Boey to re-design the classic St Pat's school uniform. The old design consisted of an all-white school uniform with the blue metal badge and blue belt (with a single green racing stripe and golden buckle). After Boey's re-design, the old white top was replaced with a new white button-up or polo T-shirt with two green racing stripes running down the left.

=== House colours and sporting events ===
The school has four houses, named after former brother principals of the school.

- Brother Joseph McNally (McNally House) – Green
- Brother Joseph Kiely (Kiely House) – Blue
- Brother Stephen Buckley (Buckley House) – Orange
- Brother Alban Rozario (Alban House) – Red

=== School rally ===
As do all other Lasallian schools, St Patrick's School's students sing the School Rally every Monday morning. The instrumental backing track is derived from the old Irish marching song O'Donnell Abu, with the lyrics having been written by Bro Marcian James Cullen (1869-1938).

Verse 1	Chorus	Verse 2	Chorus
All through our college, a voice is resounding Promptly respond to your duty's sweet call Harken you all for the trumpet is sounding, Your Mater's proclaiming her watchword to all.	Forward her children dear, ever with hearts sincere, Render with joy to your Mater her due. All that is vile reject, heaven will e'er protect Sons of Saint Patrick's valiant and true.	Onward and upward in life's earnest battle Joyously bearing the brunt of the fight Nobly forgiving for aught that may pain you, And bravely defending the cause of the right.	Forward her children dear, ever with hearts sincere, Render with joy to your Mater her due. All that is vile reject, heaven will e'er protect Sons of Saint Patrick's valiant and true.

== Co-curricular activities ==
=== Uniformed groups ===
St Patrick's has four Uniformed Group CCAs:

- Military Band
- Pajigwad Scout Troop
- National Cadet Corps (Air)
- National Police Cadet Corps

==== Military band ====
The St Patrick's School Military Band (SPSMB) was Singapore's first school band and is highly decorated in Singapore and abroad.

The idea of a Military Band was first mentioned on 2 March 1953 when Dato' Dr Charles Joseph Pemberton Paglar generously promised funds for the school to purchase instruments. A fledgling cadet band consisting of the bugle, fife and drum was formed in January 1957, which subsequently became a full-fledged military band in 1964. It was only in the mid-1980s that the SPSMB finally became a full-fledged concert band.

As of 2023, the SPSMB has won 17 consecutive gold awards at the Singapore Youth Festival (SYF). Moreover, the SPSMB was also among the first batch of bands to achieve the newly-introduced Gold with Honours award at the 2007 SYF, and was the first band to be awarded four consecutive Gold with Honours Awards as of the 2011 SYF.

In 1982, the SPSMB and its alumnus were invited to play at the St Patrick's Day Parade in New York City.

==== Pajigwad Scout Troop ====
The Saint Patrick's Pajigwad Scout Troop is the oldest scout troop in the Katong district. Prior to this, an "Open" Scout Troop had been operating in the school, which had been sponsored by Rev Fr C. Gauthier of the Church of the Holy Family.

The Pajigwad Troop came into existence when the "Open" Troop was revived by Charles Richards, also known as Green Pigeon. It was also Richards who gave the troop its motto, "Pajigwad", which means "Stick to it!" With the help of Br Canice Brennan, and Terence Aeria (a former teacher at the school), Pajigwad managed to form a Junior Troop by March 1946, with the Senior Troop being incorporated by September that year.

Today, the Scouts have received many awards, such as the 2022 Frank Cooper Sands GOLD Award, as well as Chief Commissioner's Award 2023.

=== Sports ===
St Patrick's has eight Sports CCAs:

- Football
- Golf
- Basketball
- Track and Field
- Tennis
- Floorball
- Cricket
- Badmintion

==== Football ====
The St Patrick's football team was built up by Bro Coleman Baptist in the 1960s, who had brought it to prominence back then. He is also credited with having initiated the annual inter-class league at that time.

Since its inception, the football team has continued to perform well in national-level tournaments, consistently clinching the top 4 positions at the 'B' and 'C' Division levels in the National School Games. Several professional football players such as Christopher van Huizen, and Keshav Kumar were also former St Patrick's footballers.

==== Performance at the National School Games ====
Besides football, several of St Patrick's other sports teams have also performed consistently well at the recent National School Games—these being Golf, Track & Field, Cricket and Badminton.

=== Aesthetics ===
St Patrick's has three Aesthetics CCAs:

- Modern Dance
- Drama
- Guitar Ensemble

Of these, the Guitar Ensemble has consistently performed well at the Singapore Youth Festival, having most recently attained a Certificate of Distinction in 2019.

=== Clubs and societies ===
St Patrick's has four Clubs and Societies:

- Legion of Mary
- Library
- Media Club
- Singapore Youth Flying Club

=== Student leadership ===
Prior to 2021, the student leadership of St Patrick's consisted of four distinct branches: The Prefectorial Board, the Peer Leaders' Council, the Patrician Ambassadors, and the Sports Leaders.

However, in 2021, Mr Mark Minjoot had re-organised the school's student leaders into a single unified Student Council. The new Student Council was then divided into four branches: the School Operations Branch, the School Spirit Branch, the School Catholic Activities Branch and the School Publicity Branch.

== Alumni ==
Politicians and Civil Servants

- Tony Tan, seventh President of Singapore
- George Yeo, former Cabinet Minister
- Patrick Tay, Member of Parliament for Pioneer SMC
- Chong Chieng Jen, Malaysian politician; Member of Parliament from Democratic Action Party (DAP)
- Yee Jenn Jong, former non-constituency Member of Parliament (NCMP)
- Barry Desker, former Singapore diplomat
- Moses Lee, Singaporean President's Scholar
- George Bogaars, former Head of Civil Service Singapore
- Sidek Saniff, former Senior Minister of State for Education and Environment
- Lui Pao Chuen, former Chief Defence Scientist, MINDEF

Arts and Business

- John Klass, radio DJ/Recording artiste
- Hayden Ng, fashion designer
- Glenn Ong, radio DJ
- Andrew Seow, actor and celebrity
- Sheikh Haikel, actor and singer
- Alvin Tan, founder, The Necessary Stage
- Cyril Wong, poet
- Brian Richmond, former radio DJ and sports commentator
- Dato' Brian Chang, founder of PPL Shipyard Pte Ltd

Sports

- Kelly Chan, former national sailor
- Choo Kah Wah, former SEA Games Judo gold medallist
- Brian Batchelor, former national footballer
- Amos Boon, former Singapore Premier League goalkeeper
- Steven Tan, former national footballer
- Jordan Emaviwe, national footballer
- Aloysius Yapp, 9-ball pool player (World no. 1)
- Christopher van Huizen, national footballer

Catholic Clergy

- Rev. Fr. Adrian Yeo
- Rev. Fr. Ignatius Yeo
- Rev. Fr. Bernard Wee O.C.D.
- Rev. Fr. Marcus Chew
- Rev. Fr. Valerian Chong
- Rev. Fr. Kevin Wee
- Rev. Fr. Paul Goh
- Rev. Fr. Eugene Vaz
- Rev. Fr. Ambrose Vaz
- Rev. Fr. Damian De Wind
- Rev. Fr. Michael Chan (Opus Dei)
- Rev. Fr. Jovita Ho

== Past principals ==
The list of principals of St Patrick's School since its inception in 1933 is as follows:

1. Bro Loarn Lynam (1933)
2. Bro Stephen Buckley (1934-1935)
3. Bro Henry Jassaud (1936-1940)
4. Bro Matthias Linehan (1941)
5. Bro Patrick Donovan (1941-1945)
6. Bro Canice Brennan (1945-1946)
7. Bro Alban Rozario (1947-1952)
8. Bro Lawrence Robless (1953-1957)
9. Bro Justinian de Souza (1957-1962)
10. Bro Lawrence Robless (1963-1964)
11. Bro Patrick Loh (1964-1966)
12. Bro Joseph Kiely (1967-1972)
13. Bro Dennis Watt (1973-1974)
14. Bro Joseph McNally (1975-1982)
15. Bro Oliver Rogers (1983-1984)
16. Joseph Ng (1986-1988)
17. Bro Joseph Guan (1989-1991)
18. Goh Bian Koon (1991-1997)
19. Michael de Silva (1997-2001)
20. Lak Pati Singh Lucas (2002-2011)
21. Adolphus Tan Chin Eng (2012-2017)
22. Eric Lee Wei Tat (2018-2019)
23. Mark Gerard Minjoot (2019–2025)
24. Aloysius Ting Poh Leong (2026–present)
