= Glenn Ong =

Singaporean radio presenter (born 1970)

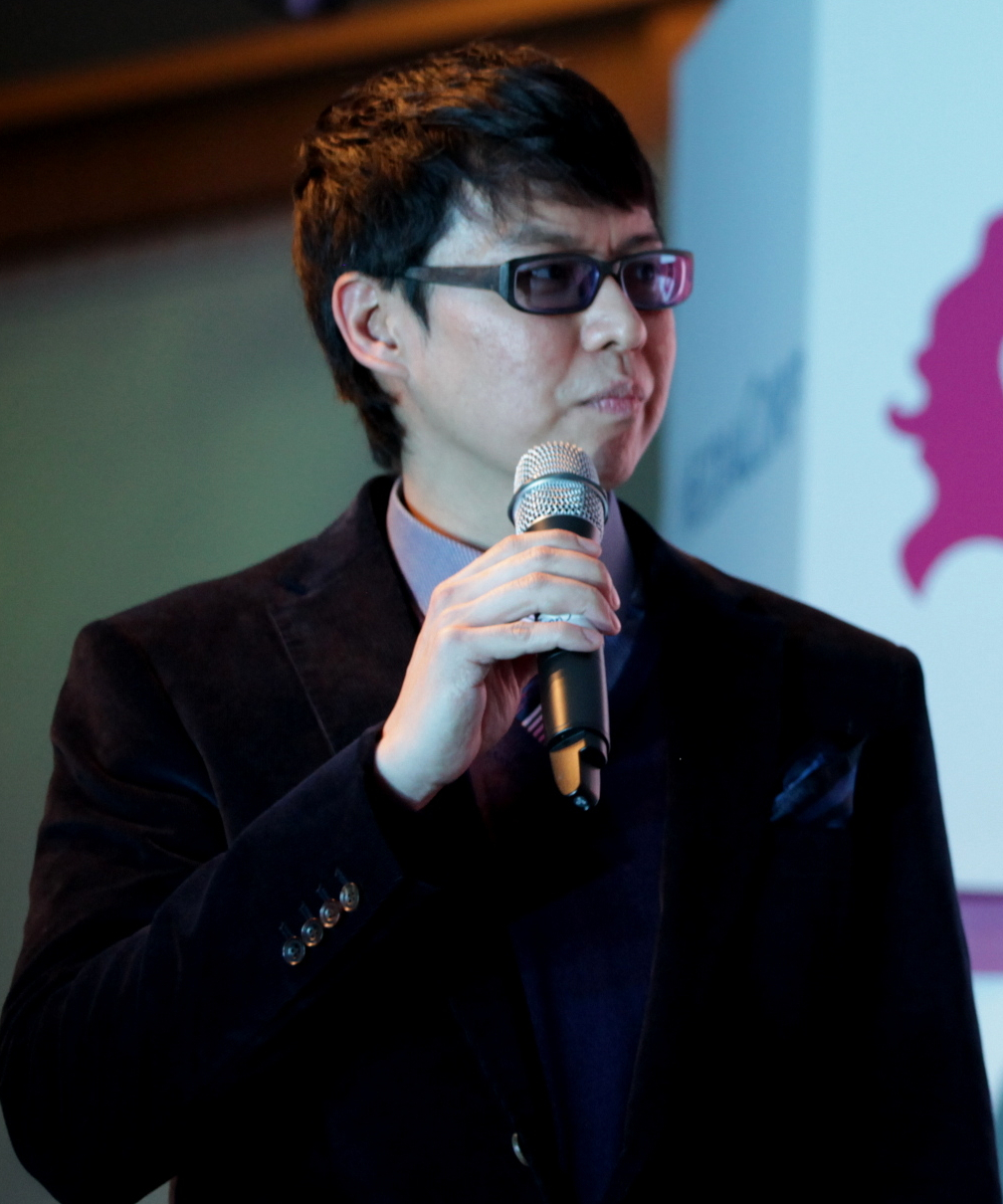
- Ong in 2013
- Born: Glenn Francis Ong Su Kar; 22 June 1970 (age 56); Singapore
- Education: St. Patrick's School; Siglap Pre-University Institute
- Spouses: Kate Reyes (m. 2000; div. 2003) Jamie Yeo (m. 2004; div. 2009) Jean Danker (m. 2016; div. 2024)
- Presenting career
- Stations: 987FM (former); Class 95FM (former)
- Network: MediaCorp Radio (former)
- Stations: One FM 91.3 (former); Kiss92 (current)
- Network: SPH Radio
- Style: Disc Jockey
- Country: Singapore

Chinese name
- Traditional Chinese: 王書佳
- Simplified Chinese: 王书佳
- Hanyu Pinyin: Wáng Shūjiā

Glenn Francis Ong Su Kar (born 22 June 1970) is a Singaporean radio presenter at SPH Radio's Kiss92 FM, a Singapore English radio station, hosting the morning show with Angelique Teo and Mark Van Cuylenberg (The Flying Dutchman). A radio veteran of over 20 years, Ong has been described as "foul, politically incorrect but refreshingly candid".

== Early life and career ==
An alumnus of St. Patrick's Schools and Siglap Pre-University Institute, Ong became a full-time DJ at Perfect 10 987FM in 1993, and is also an emcee and voice-over talent for commercials. He hosted radio shows like Say It with Music, ATrax, Top 20 Countdown and, in 1995, a hit late-night show called The Ego Trip, which aired every weeknight from 11pm to 2 am.

It was on the Ego Trip that the characters short fart, Simone, The Godfather and the Honky Tong Man were born. He performed all of the voices and soon had a cult following. Known for his wit and mean remarks to callers, the Ego Trip became a controversial, and a much appreciated and discussed late night radio show among students studying at that time of the night.

Ong through the years has been involved in TV and movies, he was on Showbuzz, radio TV with Jean Danker, The Dancefloor with the Flying Dutchman, movie wise, he was the radio voice in the film The Teenage Textbook Movie.

On 8 December 2002, Ong announced that he was going on leave indefinitely. On the first Friday of 2003, Mediacorp confirmed that Ong had quit with immediate effect. Five days later, Singapore-based F&B hospitality and consultancy firm CIRVIS's managing director Chris Glaessel announced in a press release that Ong was now director of the company.

In 2006, Ong was suspended from broadcasting for two weeks by MediaCorp after being fined by the Media Development Authority of Singapore due to inappropriate content on the show Five Guys And A Girl which he hosted with Rod Monteiro.

In July 2015, six months after Ong left Class 95FM, he joined rival radio station, SPH Radio's One FM 91.3 in the mornings, this time alongside The Flying Dutchman, Andre Hoeden and Elliott Danker.

Since February 2023, Ong currently co-hosts The Big Show on Kiss92 FM, weekday mornings from 6 to 10am.

== Personal life ==
In January 2000, Ong married Kate Reyes, also a radio presenter; they divorced by April 2003.

Ong then married former Star Sports personality and radio presenter Jamie Yeo in December 2004. In February 2009, he announced that they had separated.

In June 2011, he announced his marriage to radio presenter Jean Danker. On 16 December 2016, Ong and Jean Danker were married in a seaside solemnisation ceremony at Sofitel Singapore Sentosa Resort & Spa. On 24 December 2024, they confirmed speculation that they have mutually decided to part ways after 8 years of marriage.
