= Masters of the Sea (TV series) =

Singaporean television series

- Created by: Joanne Brough
- Written by: Joash Moo
- Starring: Wong Li-Lin; Ng Chin Han; Irene Ng; Bryan Wong; Lim Kay Tong; Donald Li
- Composer: Singapore Symphony Orchestra
- Country of origin: Singapore
- Original language: English
- No. of episodes: 20

Production
- Production location: Singapore
- Running time: 30 minutes

Original release
- Network: Channel 5
- Release: 12 October 1994 – 22 February 1995

Masters of the Sea was a 1994 television drama series produced by the Television Corporation of Singapore (TCS), the predecessor of Mediacorp. It was the first full-length English drama series to be produced in Singapore. The series starred Wong Li-Lin, Ng Chin Han, Irene Ng, Bryan Wong, and Aziz Mustajab.

== Reception ==
Masters of the Sea was derided by some as "fairly disastrous". One of the criticisms was that it portrayed an elderly Peranakan woman wearing the wrong costumes and ornaments and speaking the wrong phrases.

The creator of Masters of the Sea, Joanne Brough, mentioned in 1995 that it was "too ambitious for a first effort", due to having a larger cast and not enough time to develop plots in a limited 30-minute episode. TCS executive Daniel Yun said in 1997 that the failure was because the foreign consultants did not understand the local context, and called it a "half-baked Singaporean attempt". Despite that, the experiences helped TCS to produce later serials, including Triple Nine and Growing Up.
