= Cut Sleeve Boys =

2006 British-Hong Kong film by Ray Yeung

- Film poster
- Directed by: Ray Yeung
- Written by: Ray Yeung
- Produced by: Ray Yeung; Chowee Leow
- Starring: Chowee Leow; Steven David Lim; Gareth Rhys Davis; Neil Collie; John Campbell
- Cinematography: Patrick Duval
- Edited by: Anuree De Silva; Catherine Fletcher
- Music by: Paul Turner
- Production company: Fortissimo Films
- Distributed by: TLA Releasing
- Release date: 2006
- Running time: 86 minutes
- Countries: United Kingdom; Hong Kong

Cut Sleeve Boys is a 2006 feature film written, produced and directed by Ray Yeung. The comedy follows the lives of two gay Asian best friends Mel (Steven Lim) and Ash (Chowee Leow) as they negotiate the gay scene of London.

== Plot ==
Mel and Ash - two British-Chinese gay men attend their closeted university friend Gavin's funeral, presided over by Pastor Joseph Szeto. At the funeral, they meet Diane, a transgender woman wearing a dress designed by Gavin before his death.

Following the funeral, they begin examining their lives. Mel wants to stay in the London gay scene and continue his life of promiscuity and partying, while Ash wants to find a long-term boyfriend, but believes they are unable to find a suitable “macho” partner, while being too effeminate themselves.

Returning home from Ash's flat, Mel discovers Todd, a closeted Welshman that Mel had previously had a sexual relationship with on his doorstep. Todd has left his rural life in Wales behind, hoping to claim on Mel's previous promise of letting him stay. Mel soon lets him in, helps him to secure a retail job at Harvey Nichols, and resumes their relationship.

After a series of unfulfilling hook-ups, Diane arrives at Ash's front door with her partner Ross, and after a conversation, reveals that they had attended university together as friends - transitioning in the interim years, and changing her name from Dan. Diane presents Ash with one of Gavin's dresses, which Ash comfortably tries on. Ash starts researching transgender dating websites, and discovers that men seeking connections with transgender women and transvestites are more in-line with what Ash is looking for in a partner. Ash decides to start crossdressing and attends a transgender and transvestite club night with Todd and Mel.

At their first club event, Ash meets Ross, now separated from Diane, and takes him home - satisfied with the attention they receive from a “macho” man, but does not let him stay the night, uncomfortable with the idea that they might have to sleep in their new feminine clothes. Ross nevertheless says they will call Ash. Mel and Todd meet another man, Antoine, and go home together, but Mel is seemingly jealous of the attention that Todd receives from Antoine. The next day, Todd and Mel argue, with Mel wanting an open relationship, and Todd wanting monogamy.

Later at the gym, Todd reveals to Mel that he has come out to his parents, and attracts attention from another man from the gym, Brad. After seeing them exchange numbers, which makes Mel jealous. Todd's parents invite Mel to visit them in Wales, but Mel refuses. The two fight, and Mel tells Todd to move out - saying he is not cut out to be a boyfriend.

Ross later calls Ash, cancelling their date due to illness, but Ash offers to look after him, and they bond further - with Ash fantasising about marrying him and staying the night. During the night, Ash's make-up is ruined, and embarrassed, they cut the sleeve from their shirt to leave the bed without waking Ross. Ash runs home, but is chased by two homophobic men who had previously cat-called them. Embarrassed by the experience, Ash starts ignoring Ross’ calls, while Mel returns to their life of promiscuity, seemingly unfulfilled by their one-night-stands. Ross later turns up at Ash's door, desperate to see them. Ash lets him in, but tells him that if he can't accept them without crossdressing, they will no longer see each other. The two sleep together, but Ash finds Ross masturbating, while wearing their lingerie and make-up.

Concerned by his age, Mel goes to an aesthetician, who turns out to be Brad. Brad tells him that Todd refused to sleep with him, and confessed to being in love with Mel. Ash decided to give up their new life, and attempts to return the dresses to a charity shop where Diane is working, who talks to them about the bravery of presenting her true self.

Ash and Mel attend a reading of Gavin's will, and are left a share of £100,000, shared with Gavin's fiancé, Choi Lin. His life insurance payout of £500,000 is given to Pastor Joseph Szeto, who Gavin was in love with. At Mel's flat, Joseph and Choi Lin watch a home movie from the group's time at university. Joseph then reveals that Gavin always regretted not coming out at the same time as Mel and Ash, and was planning to come out as gay to his family, and become a fashion designer. Joseph emphasises his regret for not reciprocating his feelings.

Mel and Todd meet up, but Todd rebuffs his advances, implying himself to have risen through society, and no longer needing Mel's validation. Ross arrives at Ash's flat in make up and feminine clothes asking Ash to accept him for who he is. Initially, Ash is unable to reciprocate, but after scaring off the cat-callers who assault Ross, the two share an intimate moment.

12 months later, Choi Lin is a single mother, Diane has come out as a lesbian, Joseph has left the church, Mel is still single, Todd has maxed out his credit card and become a rent boy, and Ash and Ross are a couple - both wearing feminine clothes.

== Cast ==
- Chowee Leow as Ashley Wang
- Steven David Lim as Melvin Shu
- Gareth Rhys Davis as Todd Charrington
- Neil Collie as Ross Foreman
- John Campbell as Diane/Dan
- Mark Hampton as Gavin Chan
- Paul Cox as Brad

== Release ==
- Cut Sleeve Boys premiered in January 2006 at the International Film Festival Rotterdam. The film was represented by Fortissimo Films for World Sales. It was sold to the US, UK, Portugal, France, German speaking Europe, Benelux, Thailand, Taiwan and Philippines. The film had cinematic release in Bangkok and Taipei.
- Regent Releasing released the film in cinemas across USA including San Francisco, Los Angeles, Chicago, Minneapolis and Hollywood. Cut Sleeve Boys was also broadcast on Here! TV and Logo TV.
- TLA Releasing UK released the film in the United Kingdom.
- It screened in over 30 film festivals around the world including the Hong Kong International Film Festival, Bangkok International Film Festival, and Taipei Film Festival.

== Reception ==
Critics gave the film mixed reviews. Cut Sleeve Boys holds a 42% approval rating on Rotten Tomatoes. Phil Hall from Film Threat wrote "Something of a surprise: a gay-oriented feature that is genuinely touching and sincere." Ken Fox from TV Guide wrote, "It's pretty much gay business as usual." Paul Malcolm from LA Weekly said, "Yeung handles [his characters'] parallel journeys of self-discovery with humor, grace and an occasionally heavy hand, with Leow giving a winning performance as Ash." Rich Cline from Shadows on The Wall indicates the film as "surprisingly endearing as it tries to examine the nature of masculinity in a seriously un-masculine subculture."

== Awards ==
- Winner Best Feature at the 4th Fusion Festival in Outfest in 2006
- Winner Best Actor (to Chowee Leow) at the 11th LesGaiCineMad Madrid International LGBTI Film Festival in 2007
- Winner Audience Award for Best Feature at the 11th LesGaiCineMad Madrid International LGBTI Film Festival in 2007
