= Jean Danker =

Singaporean radio and television presenter (born 1978)

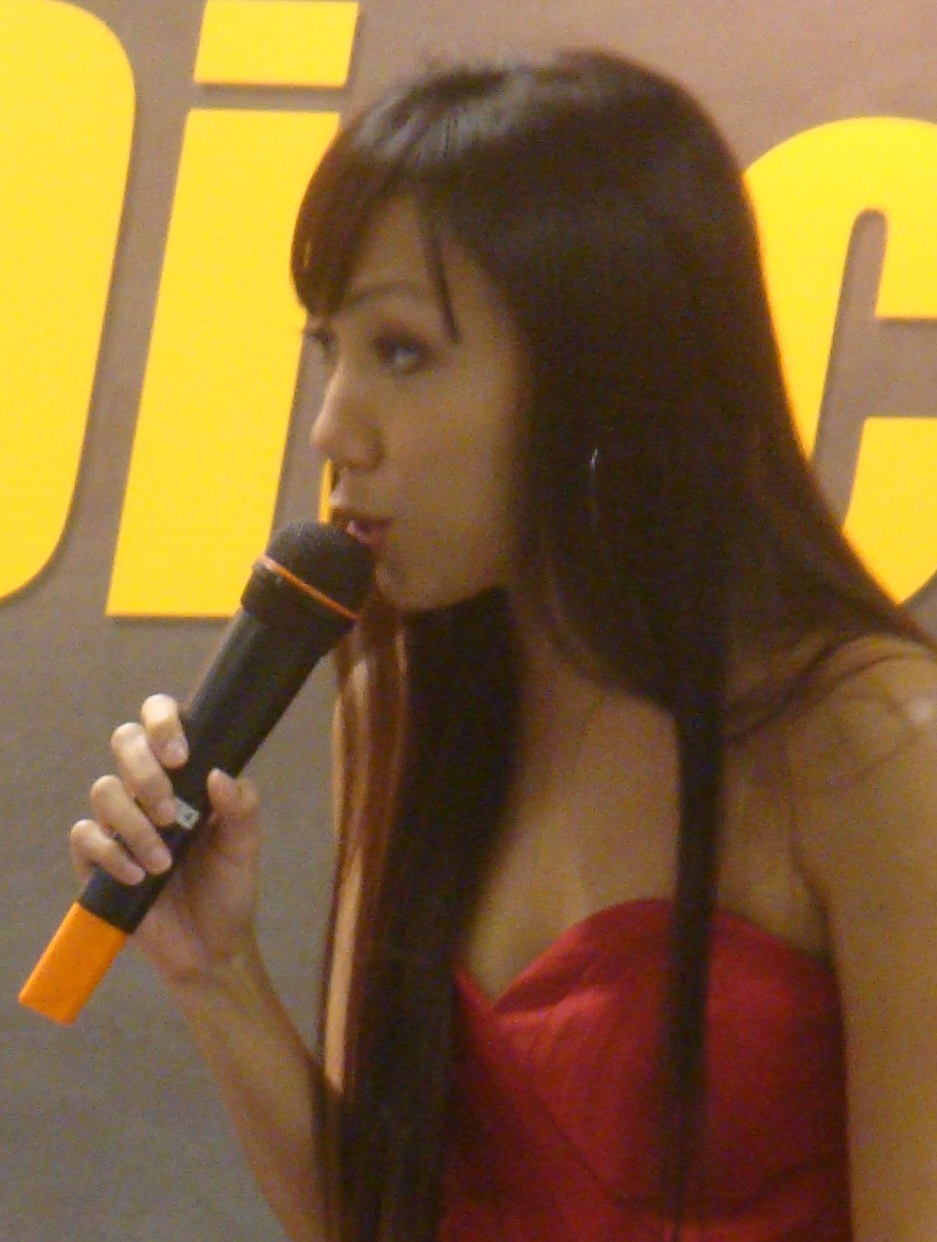
- Jean Danker hosting the Circle Line Stage 1 and 2 open house in April 2010
- Born: Jean Olivia Danker; 24 September 1978 (age 48); Singapore
- Education: Ngee Ann Polytechnic
- Occupations: Radio presenter; Television presenter; actress
- Agent: Mediacorp
- Spouse: Glenn Ong (m. 2016; div. 2024)
- Presenting career
- Show: The 5 Search
- Station: Class 95
- Network: Mediacorp Radio
- Style: Disc Jockey
- Country: Singapore

Chinese name
- Traditional Chinese: 琴丹克
- Simplified Chinese: 琴丹克
- Hanyu Pinyin: Qín Dānkè

Jean Olivia Danker (born 24 September 1978) is a Singaporean radio DJ at Mediacorp's Class 95, a Singapore English radio station, who hosts the evening show Cartunes on weekdays from 5–8 pm.

She also does voiceover work and is involved in television productions. She acted in the drama Restless and hosted health and beauty shows such as Body Beautiful and Adventures In Healthcare and family gameshow Look Who’s Leading.

== Personal life ==
Jean Danker married Glenn Ong on 16 December 2016, in a seaside solemnisation ceremony at Sofitel Singapore Sentosa Resort & Spa. On 24 December 2024, they confirmed speculation that they have mutually decided to part ways after 8 years of marriage.

== Selected filmography ==
Danker has appeared in the following programmes:

=== Television series ===
- Restless

=== Show host ===
- Adventures In Healthcare
- National Day Parade (2002-2006, 2008, 2014, 2016)
- Body Beautiful (2003)
- Look Who’s Leading (2005)
- The 5 Search (2015)
- President's Star Charity (2015)
- Hungry For Love (2018)
- R U OKAY? (2022−present; also in audio podcast format)
