= Hayden Ng =

Singapore based Fashion designer (born 1966)

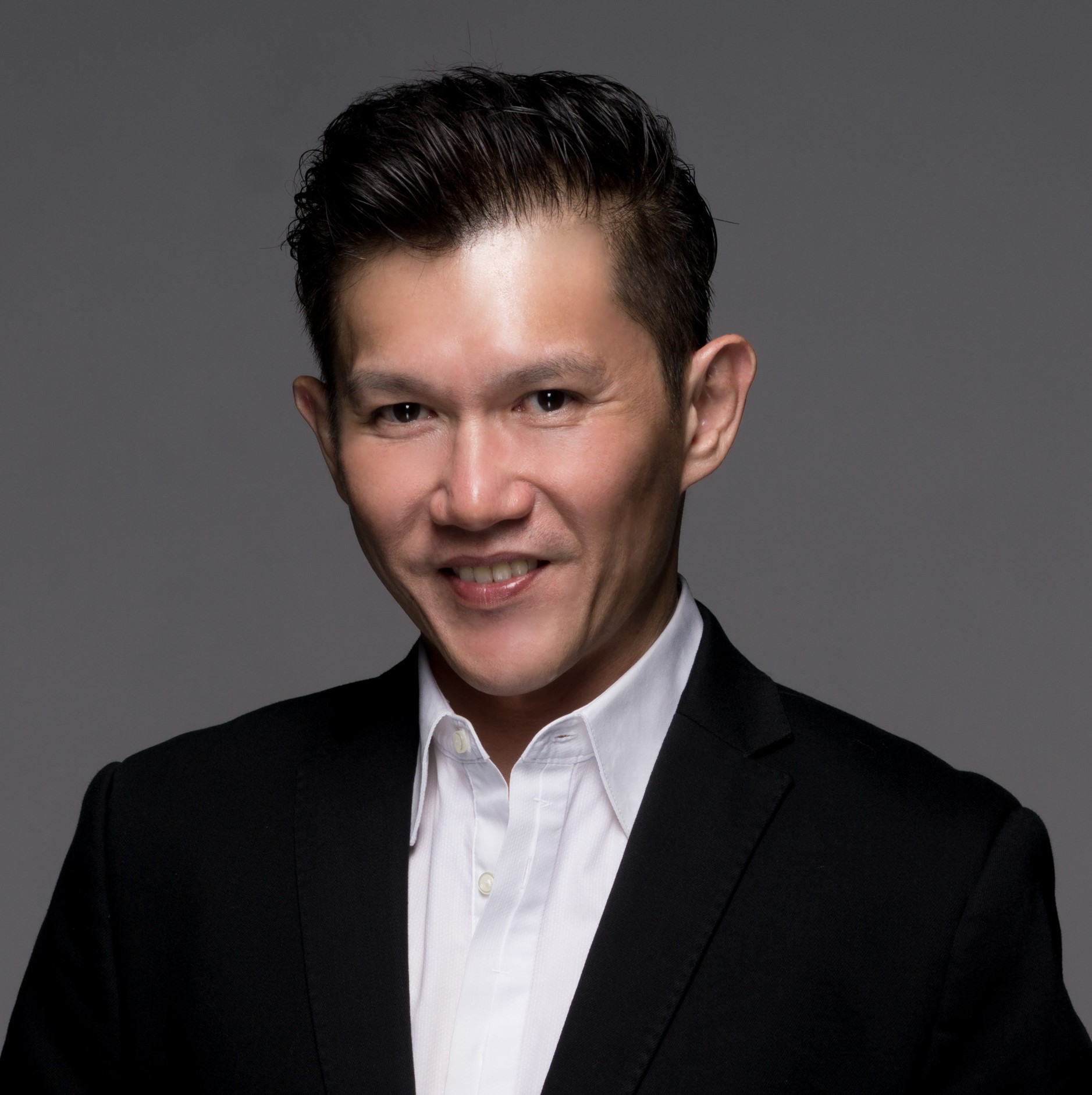
- Born: 20 January 1966 (age 60); Singapore
- Education: Saint Patrick's School
- Occupation: Fashion designer
- Label: Hayden
- Website: www.haydensingapore.com

Hayden Ng (Chinese: 吳海登; pinyin: Wú Hǎidēng; born 20 January 1966) is a Singapore based Fashion designer.

== Early life and education ==
Ng studied at Saint Patrick's School, Singapore. After his secondary school education, Ng started his fashion career.

== Career ==
In 1987, while doing his national service, Ng dressed Marion Nicole Teo for her contest for Miss Singapore Universe. Ng then opened his fashion boutique HAYDEN in the same year.

Ng had represented Singapore for the Dalian Fashion Festival in China in 1990.

In 1992, Ng started costume designing for theatre. From 2001 to 2003, Ng was the Chief Costume Designer for Singapore's National Day Parade.

In 2006, Ng was nominated for the Straits Times’ 6th Life! Theatre Awards for best costume designer. Ng also designed the new ceremonial attire for the Singapore contingent for 2006 Far East and South Pacific Games for the Disabled Games in Kuala Lumpur that year.

Ng subsequently also dressed Miss Universe Singapore 2009, Rachel Kum, Miss Universe Singapore 2010, Tania Lim and Miss Universe Singapore 2011, Valerie Lim.

In 2015, Ng wrote an article entitled Uniform which is collected in the Singapore Armed Forces' SAF50 Commemorative Book, Giving Strength to Our Nation: The SAF and Its People.

In August 2015, Ng created the ASEAN Fashion Designers Showcase to show the different fashion styles of Asia and increase cultural exchange.

== Accolades ==
On 10 November 2019, Silk Road International Fashion Week nominated Ng as one of the five designers for their fashion design.

On 1 October 2022, Aspara Fashion Week awarded Ng The Award Of Contribution For The Asian Fashion Industry.
