= Dear Straight People =

LGBT media website in Singapore

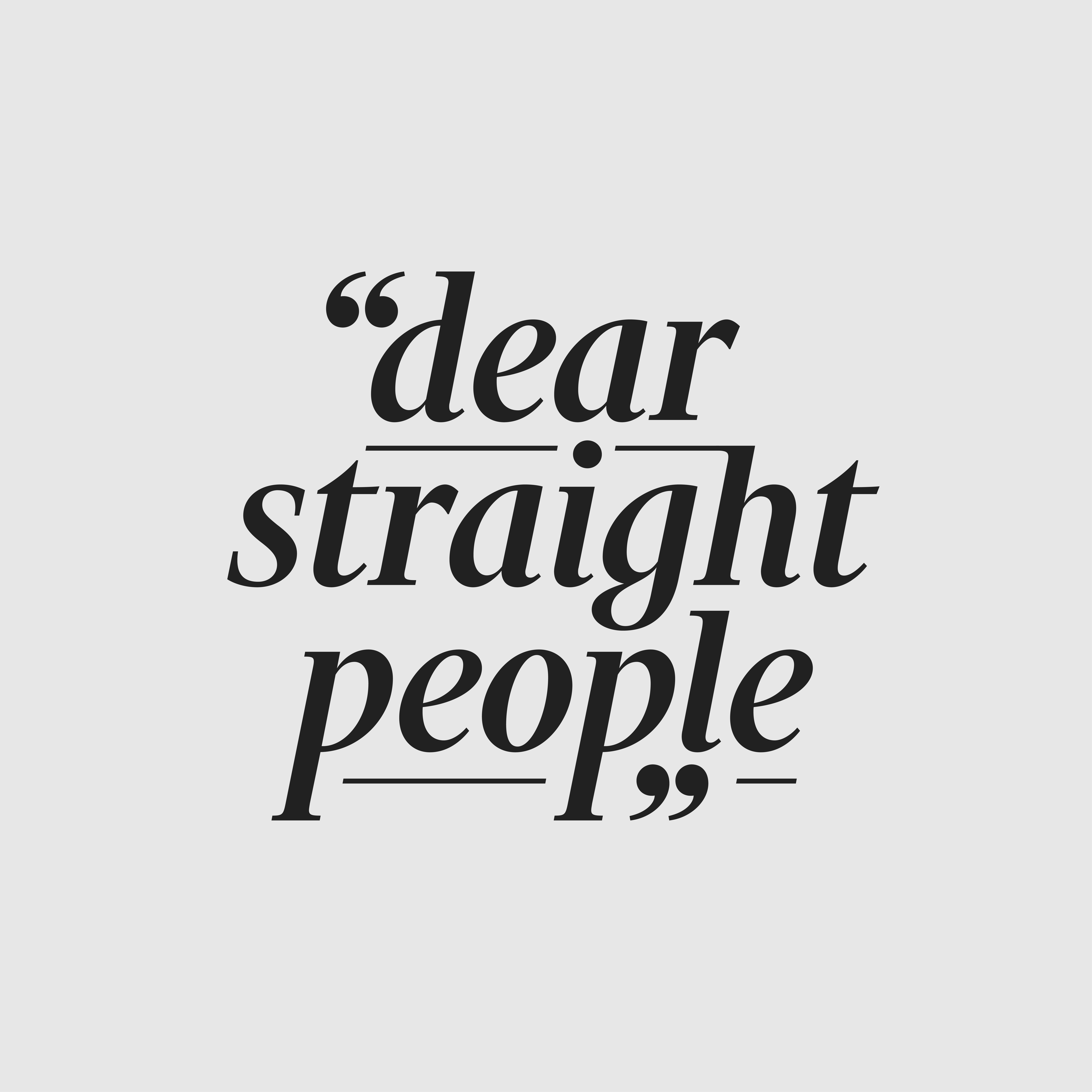

Dear Straight People is an LGBT media platform based in Singapore. Founded in 2015, Dear Straight People has gained prominence as one of Asia's leading LGBT publications.

== History ==
Founded by Sean Foo in July 2015, Dear Straight People initially gained attention for publishing coming out stories, which included notable public figures such as Paralympic medalist Theresa Goh, influencer Edison Fan, actor Steven David Lim, actress Deborah Sim and the host of Drag Race Thailand, Pangina Heals.

== Collaborations ==
Dear Straight People has collaborated with various LGBTQ+ organizations and groups over the years.

Notable collaborations include partnerships with the LGBTQ+ counseling center Oogachaga and the sex workers' rights group Project X, aimed at raising funds and awareness for their respective missions.

Additionally, the platform has actively engaged in collaborations with companies to support Pride campaigns. In 2021, Dear Straight People partnered with Naumi Hotel Singapore to produce a pride campaign featuring a real-life married gay couple. The campaign was noted for being the 'first time a hotel in Singapore has done such a high-profile paid partnership with an LGBTQ+ couple'.

== Notable productions ==
In 2017, Dear Straight People produced a music video for an LGBT cover of the Kit Chan song Home, performed by bisexual singer Lew Loh, which garnered attention and sparked discussions in Singapore. Later that year, Dear Straight People organized a photo shoot called #Reasons4Repeal in support of the repeal of Section 377A. The photo shoot featured over 70 individuals, including former Mediacorp actor Julian Hee.

In 2019, the platform produced the documentary series "Same Love," consisting of three episodes showcasing same-sex couples in Singapore. The series premiered on "Dear Straight People's" YouTube channel on February 11, 2019. The first episode, featuring an openly gay Malay couple with an accepting mother, gained widespread attention and sparked controversy in Malaysia.

=== Getaway ===
In 2022, Dear Straight People produced Getaway, which made history as Singapore's first gay Boys Love web drama series. Comprising 5 episodes, Getaway featured an openly queer cast from Singapore and Thailand.

Getaway was a hit, with its first episode garnering over 4 million views on YouTube to date. In addition, the series was nominated for Content of the Year at the 2023 edition of Singapore's national broadcaster Mediacorp's content creator awards, The Pinwheels.

Following Getaway's popular reception, Taiwan-based LGBT streaming service GagaOOLala purchased the rights to stream the series on their platform. On 28 September 2023, Getaway premiered on GagaOOLala.

=== The Unfiltered Gay Podcast ===
On 17 April 2024, Dear Straight People launched The Unfiltered Gay Podcast, a talk show hosted by Sean Foo, Isaac Tng, Kieran Cheang and Aiman Haikal. Over its first three seasons, the Unfiltered Gay Podcast featured several notable guests, including television host Allan Wu and former professional footballer Thomas Beattie.

In 2025, the podcast won Most Social Good Video at Mediacorp's content creator awards, The Pinwheels, for the episode “The Raw Truth About Bareback Sex.” Produced in collaboration with Gayhealth.sg and Action for AIDS (AFA), the episode aimed to deliver safe-sex education in a format that was both honest and entertaining.

== Awards and nominations ==
Organisation	Year	Category	Nominated work	Result	Ref
The Pinwheels	2023	Content of the Year	Getaway	Nominated	
The Pinwheels	2025	Most Social Good Video	"The Raw Truth About Bareback Sex" (The Unfiltered Gay Podcast)	Won	
