= Wong Li Lin =

Singaporean actress (born 1972)

- Born: 30 August 1972 (age 53); Singapore
- Education: Haig Girls' School; Temasek Secondary School
- Alma mater: Royal Ballet School; University of Surrey
- Occupations: Actress; host; businesswoman; dancer; pilates trainer; corporate executive
- Years active: 1993–present
- Spouse: Allan Wu (m. 2003; div. 2013)
- Children: 2
- Parents: Wong Chee Kit (father); Leong Get Goh (mother)

Chinese name
- Traditional Chinese: 黃麗玲
- Simplified Chinese: 黄丽玲
- Hanyu Pinyin: Huáng Lìlíng

Wong Li Lin (born 30 August 1972) is a Singaporean media personality and businesswoman. She was formerly an actress and host on Singaporean television.

== Early life and education ==
Wong was born to Wong Chee Kit, a carpenter and furniture company owner from Senai, Malaysia, and Leong Get Goh, a housewife. She is the youngest in a family of four children and has three elder brothers. She was educated at Haig Girls' School and Temasek Secondary School. She started ballet by chance at age 9 and started teaching at the age of 13 to supplement her fees. Wong was awarded the Loke Cheng Kim scholarship to the Royal Ballet School in London. Wong's parents separated when she is 13 and later divorced when she in her 20s.

Wong took time away from showbiz when she was awarded a second scholarship for her Master's degree in Anthropology at University of Surrey. She wrote her dissertation on Falun Gong as it combined her interests in movement, spirituality and her heritage as an ethnic Chinese. Wong graduated in 2001.

== Career ==
Wong was one of the pioneers in promoting pilates in Singapore, training many trainers who subsequently started their own studios. She continued teaching prolifically and founded several dance projects. She taught at Nanyang Academy of Fine Arts and founded several dance centres. It was while teaching at Singapore's television station that she was discovered and started a career in the media.

Wong Li Lin made her television debut in 1994 and has acted in dramas such as Masters of the Sea (1994) and Rising Expectations (长河) (1997). She became a household name for her lead role as Inspector Elaine Tay in Mediacorp Channel 5 cop drama Triple Nine (Season 1 and 2) from 1995 to 1997. After a brief hiatus from acting in 1999, she returned in 2001 and started acting frequently in Mediacorp Channel 8 dramas such as Love Me, Love Me Not (2001), The Challenge (谁与争锋) (2001) and The Reunion (顶天立地) (2001). She was also one of the four judges of the reality TV series, The Dance Floor.

In 2008, Wong starred in the Singapore romance film The Leap Years alongside Ananda Everingham, and was nominated for Best Performer in the Singapore Film Awards 2009. The movie was directed by Jean Yeo. She has also starred in several European movies and telemovies such as Love Under the Sign of the Dragon (2008), Tiger Team: The Mountain of the 1000 Dragons (2010), Love in the Lion City (2009), and The Last Patriarch (2010).

Wong has held leadership roles across multiple sectors and served organisations such as Parkway Pantai, Thomson Medical as deputy director and in 2017, executive director of the Public Hygiene Council under National Environment Agency. She was most recently chief operating officer at a real estate and F&B firm and currently holds the position of Chief Executive at Mint Media.

== Personal life ==
Wong married Chinese-American actor and host Allan Wu in Los Angeles, California, United States in December 2003. They have a daughter and a son. Wong and Wu divorced in June 2013.

== Filmography ==
=== Television series ===
Year	Title	Role	Notes	Ref
1994	Masters of the Sea			
1995–1996	Triple Nine	Inspector Elaine Tay		
1997	Rising Expectations (长河)	Yu Tingting		
2001	Love Me, Love Me Not	Song Jingjing		
2001	The Challenge (谁与争锋)	Bai Zhengyu		
2001	The Reunion			
2001	The Hotel	Song Leling	Episode 12	
2002	Springs of Life	Su Fangfang		

=== Film ===
Year	Title	Role	Notes	Ref
2008	The Leap Years	Li-Ann	As young Li-Ann	
2008	Love Under the Sign of the Dragon	Li Lin	Telemovie	

== Awards and nominations ==
Organisation	Year	Category	Nominated work	Result	Ref
Star Awards	1997	Best Newcomer	—N/a	Nominated	
Star Awards	1997	Top 10 Most Popular Female Artistes	—N/a	Won	
Star Awards	2004	Top 10 Most Popular Female Artistes	—N/a	Nominated	
