= Justinian de Souza =

de Souza in the 1960s.

Brother Justinian Lawrence de Souza (28 February 1906 – 16 July 1992) was a Singaporean educator, Catholic missionary and tennis coach who served as the principal of Saint Patrick's School from 1957 to 1963 and of St. Joseph's Institution from 1963 to 1966.

== Early life and education ==
de Souza was born in Kuala Lumpur on 28 February 1902. Of Eurasian descent, he was the son of teacher Herman De Souza Sr. and the oldest of 14 siblings. He was a direct descendant of the Portuguese navigator, landowner and merchant Manoel Francisco de Souza, who lived in Malacca before moving to Singapore; other descendants include politician Pat de Souza and athlete Jocelyn de Souza. After receiving his early education at the St. Francis' Institution in Malacca, he began attending the St. Joseph's Novitiate in George Town, Penang. His favourable impression of the De La Salle Brothers who taught him had led him to join the order in 1916, though he later felt that he should have had "more supernatural motives" in becoming a member. He took his vows at the novitiate in 1923.

== Career ==
From 1926 to 1936, de Souza was posted to the St. Paul's English High School, a "premier" institute, in Burma. He was required to teach "everything" except for Burmese, though he was still to remain in class during Burmese lessons. He and other young De La Salle missionaries there would spend their weekends at a country house where they engaged in various physical activities. He was then posted to Malaysia, where he remained for a decade. He taught at the St. Xavier's Institution in Penang, the St. George's Institution in Taiping, and the St. John's Institution in Kuala Lumpur. He briefly studied in Australia following the end of the Japanese occupation.

de Souza left Malaysia for Singapore in 1947. He began teaching at Saint Patrick's School. de Souza taught additional mathematics, chemistry and religious knowledge, and his students in this period included future President of Singapore Tony Tan. He retrospectively described himself as a "holy terror" in his teaching years, commenting in 1983, long into his official retirement: "Perhaps I was too strict... I don't know." In 1957, he became the school's headmaster. A student of St. Patrick's at the time later recounted: "He was always stern-faced, thin-lipped and serious. He had a sense of humour but it showed very rarely." As principal, he pushed for and oversaw the renovation and extension of the school hall in 1961. He represented the school on the Malayan Christian Schools' Council.

When the physical fitness test was introduced in 1962, the then-60-year-old de Souza reportedly gave a demonstration to the students where he "[pulled] himself up to his chin", then "hauled himself further till the bar was at his waist, did a flip over and landed on his feet." He established a small zoo at the St. Patrick's Arts Centre which comprised two monkeys purchased from Rochor Road, birds, rabbits and guinea pigs. He gave the school a "fresh impetus" to science teaching. As tennis was a favourite sport of his, he increased the number of courts the school had from two to four. The school won the first inter-schools tennis tournament shortly after. At St. Patrick's, he was the principal to George Yeo, who would go on to become a politician and brigadier-general, and Patrick Zehnder, who would become an athletics coach.

After stepping down as principal of St. Patrick's School in 1963, de Souza became the headmaster of the St. Joseph's Institution. According to the school's deputy principal, Brother Joseph Kiely, de Souza was quick to adopt the newest teaching aids. He would use audiovisual equipment in teaching moral education. By January 1966, the Minister for Education Ong Pang Boon had appointed him the chair of the Singapore Combined Secondary Schools' Sports Council. He stepped down as principal later that year, after which he returned to St. Patrick's School as a teacher. His students in this period included DJ Brian Richmond.

de Souza officially retired in 1969 and left for Ireland, where he took a course on religious education before returning to Singapore in 1970. Though he was still in retirement, he remained with St. Patrick's as a teacher, holding religious classes. He was also the school's official tennis coach, holding tennis classes four times a week as of 1983. National tennis champion Zainuddin Ishak, who was coached by de Souza, cited the teacher as one of his greatest influences. Other tennis students of his included Victor Pereira and Suria Armanshah, the latter of whom felt that he was "lucky" to have de Souza as his coach.

de Souza went to Penang in 1973 and taught novices there for a year. He continued to teach tennis classes into his 80s, only retiring from the sport after his eyesight began to fail. In 1988, he was still holding two classes at St. Patrick's; one for six Thai De La Salle novices and an English and Bible class for a nurse and a clerk. de Souza was also volunteering at the Hawkins Road Refugee Camp, which housed refugees of the Vietnam War. He was successful in raising funds for the camp from organisations such as the Lee Foundation, the Society of St Vincent de Paul at Church of the Holy Family and the Church of Our Lady of Perpetual Succour. Additionally, he would send packages containing food and other supplies to those in need in countries such as Burma and India.

== Personal life and death ==
de Souza was affectionately nicknamed "Brother Just". He was known to be a "keen sportsman" in his younger years. He was still teaching and playing tennis at the age of 77 in 1983. Caroline Ngui of The Straits Times described him then as "[seemingly] untouched by time. His skin is taut, his body still spare, his memory precise." He could "still play a good game of tennis" in his later years. Brother Kiely was a close friend of his.

de Souza's health declined significantly in his final years. He died on 16 July 1992 after a short illness. The funeral was held on 19 July, after which he was buried at the Choa Chu Kang Cemetery. He was survived by just two sisters and a brother.
