= Getaway (web series) =

Romantic comedy web television series

- Promotional poster
- Genre: Boys' love; Romantic comedy
- Directed by: Ark Saroj
- Starring: Sean Foo; Paween Naliang; Steven David Lim
- Country of origin: Singapore
- Original language: English
- No. of seasons: 1
- No. of episodes: 5

Production
- Production company: Dear Straight People

Original release
- Network: YouTube
- Release: May 23 – June 20, 2022

Getaway is a Singaporean gay web series known for being the country's first boys' love web series. The series was launched on YouTube on 23 May 2022.

Created and produced by Dear Straight People, Getaway features a gay director alongside an openly queer cast from Singapore and Thailand.

== Synopsis ==
After his coming out goes horribly wrong, Singaporean Sam jets off to Bangkok to search for his exiled gay uncle, where he stumbles upon Top, a charismatic party boy looking for love in all the wrong places.

== Cast ==
- Sean Foo as Sam
- Paween Naliang as Top
- Steven David Lim as Sam's dad
- Nuttapon Cholvibool as Dr. Big
- Hirzi Zulkiflie as Hilmi
- Patsarun Songput as Jom
- Phillips Loh as Dave
- Otto Fong as Alex
- Zymone as Herself

== Production ==
=== Development ===
Getaway was created by Sean Foo, who also wrote, produced and starred in the series.

=== Filming ===
The entire production process took six months, but filming only lasted two days. Funded by a group of corporate sponsors with The Siam Hotel serving as the main sponsor, the other sponsors included 2eros, Ette Tea, FabulousMe, Four Seasons Hotels and Resorts Bangkok, Gayhealth.sg, Prolific Songs, Supawear, and The Writers’ Room.

== Reception ==
=== Viewership ===
"Getaway" achieved widespread popularity, with its first episode amassing over 4 million views on YouTube to date.

=== Accolades ===
The series was nominated for Content of the Year at the 2023 edition of Singapore's national broadcaster Mediacorp content creator awards, The Pinwheels.

=== Impact ===
Following Getaway's popular reception, Taiwan-based LGBT streaming service GagaOOLala purchased the rights to stream the series on their platform. On 28 September 2023, Getaway premiered on GagaOOLala.
