= Timothy Nga =

Singaporean actor (1973–2023)

- 倪佑恩
- Born: 10 June 1973; Singapore
- Died: 9 January 2023 (aged 49); Singapore
- Resting place: Mandai Crematorium and Columbarium

Chinese name
- Chinese: 倪佑恩
Transcriptions
Standard Mandarin
- Hanyu Pinyin: Ní Yòuēn

Timothy Nga (10 June 1973 – 9 January 2023) was a Singaporean actor. Nga began his professional career in 2003 and performed with several local companies, including The Necessary Stage, the Singapore Repertory Theatre (SRT), and Wild Rice.

== Acting credits ==
=== Theatre ===
Year	Title	Role
2007	Everything but the Brain	Doctor
2007	Lord of the Flies	Bill
2009	The Jungle Book	
2011	A Note Went Off In My Head	
2012	A Language of Their Own	
2017	Frago	
2019	Caught	Lin Bo

=== Film ===
Year	Title	Role
2006	The High Cost of Living	Long
2006	S11	Terence
2019	Wet Season	

=== Television ===
Year	Title	Role
2005	A New Life	Michael
2005–2007	Lifeline	LTA Szeto K.T.
2008	First Class	
2009	Fighting Spiders	
2011–2013	Zero Hero	Lenny Wong/Mister Hero
2021	The Land is Mine	Guan Meng
