= Fong Swee Suan =

Singaporean trade unionist (1931–2017)

- 方水双

Personal details
- Born: 27 October 1931 Senggarang, Johor, Unfederated Malay States
- Died: 4 February 2017 (aged 85) Singapore
- Party: Barisan Sosialis (1961–1967)
- Other political affiliations: People's Action Party (1954–1961)
- Spouse: Chen Poh Cheng (m. 1960)
- Children: 3; including Otto

Fong Swee Suan (Chinese: 方水双; pinyin: Fāng Shuǐshuāng; 27 October 1931 – 4 February 2017) was a Singaporean trade unionist, founding member of the People's Action Party (PAP), and a Barisan Sosialis leader.

== Early life and education ==
Fong was born in Senggarang, Johor, then a part of the Unfederated Malay States, on 27 October 1931. He was the third child of seven children of his laundry man father and farmer mother. He studied at Zhong Hua Primary School, and later attended the Hua Qiao Secondary School in the town of Batu Pahat. He arrived in Singapore in 1950 to study at The Chinese High School, where he first met Lim Chin Siong.

Fong opposed the introduction of the Junior Middle III examination, and was among 108 students who boycotted the examination. Due to this, he was expelled from the school. Following this, he applied to study at the Chinese teacher’s training college but was rejected due to his involvement in the boycott, and instead attended a private English School.

== Career ==
Fong became a ticket seller for the Green Bus Company in 1952. While working at the company, he joined the Singapore Bus Workers’ Union, and was later elected the union's secretary general in 1953.

== Political career ==
In 1954, Fong was introduced to Lee Kuan Yew via the Singapore Chinese Middle School Students' Union and later formed the People's Action Party with Lee and other trade unionists, lawyers and journalists on 21 November 1954. Fong became a member of PAP's first Central Executive Committee. In the same year, he and Lim founded the Singapore Factory and Shop Workers' Union.

In 1955, Fong led a SBWU strike against Hock Lee Bus Company to improve working conditions and as a protest against unfair treatment against union members. The strike eventually led to the Hock Lee bus riots which Fong was accused of causing of the riots. He was later arrested and detained for 45 days for his involvement. Fong would later denied causing the riots years later.

On 24 October 1956, Fong was arrested again for alleged involvement in the Chinese middle school student riots and was detained with other union leaders on Saint John's Island. Fong was released in 1959 when the PAP won the 1959 general election in a landslide victory. He was subsequently appointed political secretary to the Minister of Labour and Law.

On 14 July 1961, Lee, who became the prime minister of Singapore, asked Fong and two other political secretaries to resign from their posts due to a joint statement between them and other union leaders calling to abolish the Internal Security Council and for full self-government.

Fong left PAP and became the secretary-general of the newly formed Singapore Association of Trade Unions (SATU) in August. In the same month, Fong joined Barisan Sosialis as its party secretary.

On 2 February 1963, Fong was arrested during Operation Coldstore and then later sent to Malaysia for detention. He was released from detention on 26 August 1967.

== Personal life ==
Fong and his wife, Chen Poh Cheng, were childhood friends and married in 1960. They have two sons and a daughter. His son, Otto Fong, is a comic artist, playwright, and teacher.

After released from his detention in Malaysia, Fong remained in Malaysia as he was banned from entering Singapore. His ban was lifted in December 1990 and only returned to Singapore in 1998 as a Singapore permanent resident.

Fong suffered from liver cirrhosis and died on 4 February 2017 at his home; he was 85 years old. Prime minister of Singapore Lee Hsien Loong, son of Lee Kuan Yew, sent his condolences to his widow Chen on Fong's death.

Three years after Fong died, his widow Chen committed suicide on 6 December 2020. She was 84 years of age at the time of her death.
