= Ocean Ou =

- Born: Shen Yi-tseng; 12 October 1969 (age 56); Taiwan
- Occupation: Singer
- Years active: 1991-present

Chinese name
- Traditional Chinese: 歐得洋
- Simplified Chinese: 欧得洋
Transcriptions
Standard Mandarin
- Hanyu Pinyin: Ōu Dé Yáng
- Musical career
- Genres: Mandopop
- Label: Warner
- Formerly of: Y.I.Y.O
- Website: www.avex.com.tw/ocean/

Shen Yi-tseng (Chinese: 沈益嶒; pinyin: Shěn Yìcéng; born 12 October 1969), better known by his stage name Ocean Ou or Ou De Yang or Happy House Cafe, is a Taiwanese Mandopop singer. Early in his career, he was known for keeping his face hidden from public view, using computer-generated 3D models for all his album covers and music videos. He was a member of a now defunct three-man band called "Y.I.Y.O.".

== Discography ==
- 2003 北半球有歐得洋
- 2005 看見六色彩虹
- 2005 有故事的人
- 2007 101封情書
- 2009 起飛 EP
- 2011 留给幸福的十张纸条
- 2015 因为有你
