= Jamie Yeo =

Singaporean actress and radio presenter (born 1977)

- Born: 17 April 1977 (age 49); Singapore
- Education: Fairfield Methodist Primary School; Nanyang Girls' High School
- Occupations: Television host; actress; radio presenter; model
- Spouses: Glenn Ong (m. 2004; div. 2009) Thorsten Nolte (m. 2010; div. 2015) Rupert Evill (m. 2017)
- Children: 2
- Presenting career
- Show: Castrol Football Crazy (former); Maxis Football Extra (former)
- Network: ESPN Star Sports (former)
- Show: The Homestretch
- Stations: 987FM (former); SAFRA Radio (former); Power98FM (former); Gold 905FM (former)
- Network: MediaCorp Radio
- Style: Disc jockey
- Country: Singapore

Chinese name
- Traditional Chinese: 楊薏琳
- Simplified Chinese: 杨薏琳
- Hanyu Pinyin: Yáng Yìlín

Jamie Yeo (born 17 April 1977) is a Singaporean former television host, actress and radio presenter. She is known for starring in Growing Up and for co-hosting the shows Castrol Football Crazy and Maxis Football Extra on ESPN Star Sports.

== Early life ==
Yeo was born in Singapore on 17 April 1977. She attended Fairfield Methodist Primary School and Nanyang Girls' High School before moving to Dayton, Ohio for four years, where her father was posted as an engineer in the Republic of Singapore Air Force (RSAF).

She completed her secondary school education at Dayton Christian High School. After returning to Singapore, she entered Ngee Ann Polytechnic and studied mass communications, because her certificate from the United States was not recognised in Singapore so she could not take her A Level at a junior college. She eventually graduated from Ngee Ann Polytechnic in 1998.

== Career ==
Yeo began as an actress portraying Tammy in the long-running series Growing Up, She has also acted in MediaCorp Channel 8 Mandarin-language productions Holland V and Baby Boom in 2003.

Yeo left acting to pursue a radio career. From 2000 to 2006, she was a full-time DJ at MediaCorp Radio's 987FM.

In 2005, Yeo joined ESPN and became the face of shows like Nokia Football Crazy and Football Extra. In 2009, Football Crazy was renamed Castrol Football Crazy due to a change in sponsorship and it went off air in 2010.

In 2012, Yeo went back to radio with SAFRA Radio on the Singapore station Power98FM.

In 2015, Yeo returned to Mediacorp as radio DJ for Gold 905FM. In March 2016, she took over the drive-time show The Homestretch.

Yeo is also the host of the travel and lifestyle program Inside Singapore on Insider TV.

== Personal life ==
In an interview with TheSportsCampus in 2009, Yeo said her favorite football club is Arsenal F.C. and her favourite player Thierry Henry.

Yeo began dating Glenn Ong in 2001 and the couple married in New Creation Church three years later in 2004, but separated in early 2009.

In 2010, Yeo married Thorsten Nolte, a British immigrant in Singapore and the couple had a daughter. However, they divorced in February 2015. In April 2016, she gained sole custody of her daughter, Alysia.

In June 2017, she announced to the media that she was getting married for the third time to another British immigrant in Singapore, Rupert Evill, and was five months pregnant with a baby boy. Their son, Luke, was born on 29 August 2017.

Yeo moved to England with her family in July 2022. She currently lives in Lewes.

In October 2023, in support of the Breast Cancer Awareness Month, Yeo revealed that she was diagnosed with an early-stage breast cancer in 2021. Yeo said she underwent a lumpectomy and radiation therapy and is currently on an "ongoing regimen of pills" to treat the condition.
