= Growing Up (Singaporean TV series) =

Singaporean television series

- Genre: Drama
- Starring: Lim Kay Tong; Wee Soon Hui; Andrew Seow; Steven David Lim; Irin Gan
- Country of origin: Singapore
- Original language: English
- No. of seasons: 6
- No. of episodes: 128

Production
- Running time: 60 min
- Production company: Mediacorp

Original release
- Network: Channel 5
- Release: 1996 – December 2001

Growing Up is a popular English-language drama in Singapore, produced by Mediacorp's studios division, and aired on Channel 5. The show spanned six seasons, set against the backdrop of Singapore's history from the 1960s to the 1980s. It premiered in 1996 and concluded with its final season in December 2001. The repeat telecast of the drama was shown in July 2009 at 3pm. It was also one of the most popular dramas in Singapore just like the other two popular Singaporean local sitcoms Under One Roof and Phua Chu Kang Pte Ltd.

== Cast and characters ==
Main Cast

- Lim Kay Tong as Charlie Tay Wee Kiat (a.k.a. "Mr Tay")
- Wee Soon Hui as Tay Soo Mei (a.k.a. "Mrs Tay", née Gan Soo Mei)
- Andrew Seow as Gary Tay
- Steven David Lim as David Tay
- Irin Gan as Victoria "Vicky" Tay
- Fan Wen Qing as Tammy Tay (Season 1)
- Quek Sue-Shan as Tammy Tay (Season 2)
- Jamie Yeo as Tammy Tay (Season 3 to 5)

Supporting Cast

- Aileen Tan as Mae Low
- Amy Cheng as Karen (Gary's wife)
- Mohan as Uncle Govindasamy
- Ivan Tay as Chew Keng Joo (Gary's business partner and friend)
- Darren Ng as Ah Guan (David's friend)
- Catherine Sng as Auntie Chong (Mrs Tay's best friend)
- Anna Belle Francis as Jenny Lim (David's girl friend)
- Cynthia Koh as Tracy Chiu (Gary's girlfriend in Season 5)
- Benedict Goh as Tan Teck Ann (Vicky's husband)
- Gary Lee Wei as Timothy (Vicky's boyfriend in Season 5)
- Saffri Manaf as Sulaiman (the Tays' neighbour)
- Zaliha Binte Abdul Hamid as Siti (Sulaiman's wife)
- Tony Castilo as Frankie (the Tays' neighbour)
- Samantha Foo as Auntie Boon (the Tays' helper in Season 3)
- Charlene Lim as Lily Ho (Gary's girlfriend in Season 4)
- Michelle Chong as Michelle (Tammy's schoolmate in Season 3)
- Sue Tan as Poh Choo (Season 6)
- Marcus Mok as Jimmy Tan (Poh Choo's husband in Season 6)
- Tracy Tan as Li Lien (Poh Choo's teenage daughter in Season 6)
- Nick Shen as Meng (Mae's son)
- David Tan as Tan Chee Keong (Poh Choo's teenage son in Season 6)
- Fiona Xie as Shirley Ho
- Evelyn Tan as Poh Choo (season 3)

== Episodes ==
Season 1 Episodes

- Yesterday
- Walk Like A Man
- Father of The Bride
- Do You Want To Know a Secret
- Stand By Me
- Guess Who's Coming For Dinner
- To Catch A Thief
- The Longest Day
- Don't Be Cruel
- Your Cheatin' Heart
- All Shook Up
- We Can Work it Out
- Que Sera Sera

Season 2 Episodes

- The Good Old Days
- Splish Splash
- Escapades
- Soldier Blues
- For A Few Dollars More
- Turn Turn Turn
- Hit The Road Jack
- Jailhouse Rock
- Fly Away Peter Fly Away Paul
- Blood Is Thicker Than Water
- Crossroads
- Brother Of Mine
- Grandma Knows Best
- Past And Present
- She Said He Said They Said
- Room For One More
- The longest day
- Forget Me Not
- Cover Girl
- Money Matters
- The Good Son
- Till Death Do Us Part
- Home Is Where The Heart Is

Season 3 Episodes

- Love Me Tender
- Great Expectations
- Count On Me
- I Heard a Rumour
- Custom Made Help
- Mother Knows Best
- The Mourning After
- Life Without Mother
- Close To You
- Closing Ranks
- First Impressions
- Winning Ways
- Love At First Flight
- Forgiveness
- The Burning Question
- Light My Fire
- Secrets and Lies Part 1
- Secrets and Lies Part 2
- Without Prejudice
- The Way It Was
- A Woman's Place
- Affairs Of The Heart
- Working Girl Woes
- All In The Family
- No Greater Love
- All My Children

Season 4 Episodes

- Yesterday Once More
- The Way We Were
- Family Affair
- This Masquerade
- Hooked On A Feeling
- Sugar Baby Love
- You've Got A Friend
- Daddy Cool
- I Will Survive
- Release Me
- Young Hearts Run Free
- If You Leave Me Now
- Both Sides Now
- This Old Heart Of Mine
- If I Could
- You Make Me Feel Like Dancing
- Goodbye Girl
- You Don't Have To Be A Star
- Hurting Each Other
- Are You Lonesome Tonight
- It Takes Two
- If You Love Me Let Me Know
- Do You Know Where You Are Going To?
- How Deep Is Your Love
- You Don't Have To Go
- Leaving On A Jet Plane

Season 5 Episodes

- Coming Home
- Too Much Too Little Too Late
- Lovin Livin And Givin
- Ready Steady Go
- Up Against The Wall
- Wild Side Of Life
- Take On That World
- Is This A Love Thing
- Name Of The Game
- No More Tears
- Both Ends Burning
- Who What Where When Why
- Crying, Laughing, Lying, Loving (100th Episode)
- No One Is Innocent Part 1
- No One Is Innocent Part 2
- Carry On Wayward Son
- All The World's A Stage
- One Day At A Time
- Love Games
- Lies In Your Eyes
- Can This Be Love
- Code Of Love
- Stay
- Masquerade
- From Me To You
- After The Rain

Season 6 Episodes

- Straight From The Heart
- Love Is A Stranger
- Best That You Can Do
- Daddy's Home
- Is There Something I Should Know?
- Guilty
- Do You Really Want To Hurt Me?
- Love Will Tear Us Apart
- We Have A Dream
- Love On Your Side
- Total Eclipse Of The Heart
- I Could Be Happy
- The Gift
- Happy Birthday
- Through The Years

== Accolades ==
Year	Ceremony	Award	Nominee	Result	Ref
1996	Asian Television Awards	Best Newcomer	Andrew Seow	Won	
