= Triple Nine (TV series) =

- 心网追凶
- Genre: Police procedural Thriller
- Country of origin: Singapore
- Original language: English

Original release
- Network: Channel 5
- Release: 1995 – 1999

Triple Nine (Chinese: 九九九行动) is an English language police procedural television series on what was then the Television Corporation of Singapore's Channel 5 (today's MediaCorp TV Channel 5) from 1995 to 1999. As the station's earliest attempt in an action-based drama series, the series revolved around the lives of a group of police officers, namely Inspector Mike Chin (James Lye), Inspector Elaine Tay (Wong Li Lin), and Sergeant Alan Leong (Lim Yu Beng) from the Special Investigation Section of the CID.

== Cast ==
=== Main cast ===
| Cast | Role | Season Appeared | Description/Fates |
|---|---|---|---|
| James Lye | Inspector Mike Chin | 1, 2, 3, 4 | Resigned from the police force at the end of season 2 because of "Jack"'s case, and became a P.E. teacher. He was approached by ASP Pang towards the end of season 3 when Inspector Elaine was killed, and decided to rejoin the CID in the last episode of season 3. |
| Wong Li Lin | Inspector Elaine Tay | 1, 2 | Was working under ASP Pang in the Vice department of CID. Inspector Mike's love interest, killed by "Jack" towards the end of season 3. |
| Lim Yu Beng | Sergeant Alan Leong Heng Man | 1, 2, 3, 4 | Hardworking and efficient CID officer. He was a single father with a young daughter, Cindy. Sgt Alan married Chong Swee Chin in season 2 episode 21 with Cindy, Insp Mike and Insp Elaine in attendance. At the beginning of season 4, Sgt Alan went overseas for a 3-month course, and was expecting to be promoted to Staff Sergeant upon his return. Unfortunately, his promotion was hindered by Insp Herbert's adverse report on his performance. Eventually towards the end of season 4, he became a Staff Sergeant. In season 4 episode 5, Alan demonstrated that he was the fastest runner for IPPT amongst the officers. |
| Annabelle Francis | Sergeant Sarah Chan | 4 | Jovial lady officer who transferred from ASP Kho's team (working on a Filipino maid's case) to CID in season 4 episode 1. Fell in love with Inspector Martin in season 4. Was able to run and swim very well. Sgt Kim's schoolmate. There was a lot of tension between her and Kim and she was very upset with Kim in the final episode of season 4 for killing Rudy. |
| Robin Leong | Inspector Sean Han | 3, 4 | Was from Seattle (hence the slang), where he presumed himself that he was a "hot shot" in the Seattle police department before transferring over to CID. Always using his hands as actions. Rude, snobbish, arrogant, enjoys shouting, yelling and thinks too highly of himself just like Hebert de Souza, egoistic and competitive. Was described by Sergeant Sarah as "a player". Looks down on others, never agrees with anyone who is lower rank than him and thinks too highly of himself. Enjoys doing things without thinking about other people's feelings. Took it out on everyone after his argument with his father and got thrown out of the house. Rude attitude towards Dr. Ooi, shouted at her, even insulted her and did not agree with her views. Rude, totally prejudiced against Mike and treated him as a murder suspect without any concrete evidence, took actions into his own hands and threw him into the holding cell without any orders from ASP Pang in the last case of season 3. Was very lucky to get away with only a warning letter for assaulting during interrogation. Did not like Inspector Mike very much, always against him. Gets pissed off easily by Mike since the end of season 3 and in season 4. Was worried that Inspector Mike will outshine him as the top Inspector of CID after Mike decided to return to the police force and was hoping that Mike will overturn his decision to return to police force. Started off on the wrong foot with Sergeant Kim and always pisses her off throughout season 3 and 4 whenever they partner each other. |
| Loke Loo Pin | ASP Pang Sook Ching | 1, 2, 3, 4 | OC of Special Crimes, CID. Reporting officer of Mike, Elaine, Alan, Sarah and Sean. Stays alone at a HDB flat and appears single. |
| Mark Richmond | Inspector Herbert de Souza | 3, 4 | Rude and rash officer transferred from CNB. A brusque, scornful, anti-establishment loner and loose cannon. Enjoys agitating Sgt Alan Leong in seasons 3 and 4. Was angry with Dr Ooi for trying to find out his past. Was abandoned by his mother when he was 7 years old (which explains his anger). Was dating psychiatrist Dr Ooi Su-Lyn. Unable to "lie" and wrote an adverse report for Sgt Alan even though he knew that the report would hinder his impending promotion. |
| Chong Chia Suan | Sergeant Yeo Lay Kim | 3, 4 | Was once a member of the girl gang 13 Roses. Transferred from Commercial Crimes to CID in season 3 episode 1. Was a strong competitor with Sergeant Sarah when they were both in school. Was attracted to Inspector Mike, although the love was not reciprocated. In the last episode of season 4, Kim was stabbed by an assailant on her way home after she shot an 18-year-old boy. |
| James Nord-Lim | Dr Charles Soo | 1, 2, 3, 4 | Pathologist with a warped sense of humour working for the police. Good friend of ASP Pang. His wife was murdered. |

=== Guest cast ===
| Cast | Role | Season Appeared | Description |
|---|---|---|---|
| Jamie Lee | Tracey Teo | 2 | Reporter who was Insp Mike's love interest. She was vying with Insp Elaine for Mike in season 2. Tracey eventually went to Hong Kong for work. |
| Gary Lee Wei | Inspector Martin Lim | 4 | CNB officer who was attached to CID for a drug-related case in season 4 episode 6. It was revealed in the middle of season 4 that he was actually part of a heroin syndicate. He grew disillusioned after receiving a warning letter for letting off a 13-year old opium peddler, and decided to turn his back on the police. Insp Martin and Sgt Sarah were dating. Eventually Martin was killed by Sarah near the end of season 4. |
| Beatrice Chia | Dr Ooi Su-Lyn | 3, 4 | Inspector Herbert's girl friend, and a forensic psychiatrist who tried to mend the estranged relationship between Herbert and his mother. Dr Ooi first appeared in season 3, episode 8, in which she was assigned by ASP Pang to assist Insp Han with the case of the Machritche murders. |
| Sivaganesh | DSP Chandran | 2, 3, 4 | Snobbish, rude and arrogant officer who thinks too highly of himself. His brand-new Mercedes Benz was stolen in season 4 episode 3. He was extremely pissed off when questioned by Insp Herbert. Chandran is also ASP Pang's grumpy superior, and often storms into her office to complain about Herbert in season 4. |
| G. P. Revi | ASP Ganesh | 1, 2 | Ganesh was Insp Mike and Sgt Alan's reporting officer in season 1. He was fatally shot by a robber in the first episode of season 2 when he intervened in the robbery of a jewellery shop when off duty. |
| Nazeem Ansari | DSP Rajen | 3 | Rajen briefed ASP Pang about the maid's case in season 4 episode 1. |
| Kavita Sidhu | Dr Jacintha Matthews | 3 | Dr Matthews is the "new" pathologist who appeared in season 3. Insp Sean dated her for a short while. |
| Ghazali Safrain | Cpl Halim | 1, 2 | Insp Elaine's partner in season 1 and 2. |
| Amy Cheng | Inspector Emily Cheng | 3, 4 | Investigation officer on Inspector Sean Han in season 3 and Sergeant Yeo in season 4. Turned down Inspector Sean Han who tried to court her. |
| Tan Kheng Hua | Chong Swee Chin | 2 | Sgt Alan's second wife whom he married in season 2 episode 21. |
| Mike Kasem | Sergeant Patrick Fernandez | | |

== Episodes ==
=== Season 1 ===
Originally aired in 1995

1. Drink If You Dare
2. The Price of Blood
3. Silent Victims
4. Missing Children
5. Singthroat
6. Movie Madness
7. Ring Twice for Vice
8. Misfortune Teller
9. A Long Wait, A Slow Kill
10. Babies for Sale - Dead or Alive
11. Spellbound
12. Skin Deep
13. Hell for Elaine

=== Season 2 ===
Originally aired from 15 October 1996.

1. Rest in Peace ASP Ganesh
2. Right Time to Die
3. Tough Choices
4. None so Blind
5. Terminal Death
6. A Time to Kill
7. Acid Justice
8. If Looks could Kill
9. Backfire
10. Till death do us part
11. All I want for Christmas
12. Resort to Murder
13. Silent Witness
14. Sins of the Father
15. Crazy for You
16. Recipe for Murder
17. Surf for a Kill
18. Death of a Lion
19. Death before Dishonour
20. It happened one hot day
21. Guns N' Roses
22. Dead Man's Hand

=== Season 3 ===
Originally aired from 21 July 1998.

1. Pilot
2. Parental Guidance
3. Stab in the Dark
4. Face of Horror - Part 1
5. Face of Horror - Part 2
6. (Case of dismembered body of a loan shark)
7. Killer Instincts - Part 1 (Machritchie Reservoir murders)
8. Killer Instincts - Part 2
9. Mind Games - Part 1
10. Mind Games - Part 2
11. Token Angel - Part 1
12. Token Angel - Part 2
13. --
14. --
15. Unreasonable Sacrifices - Part 1
16. Unreasonable Sacrifices - Part 2
17. With Friends Like These... - Part 1
18. With Friends Like These... - Part 2
19. Red Debts - Part 1
20. Red Debts - Part 2
21. --
22. --
23. Who Needs Enemies - Part 1
24. Who Needs Enemies - Part 2
25. --
26. --

=== Season 4 ===
Originally aired in 1999.

1. Mike is back on the team. The team led by INSP Mike reopens an investigation into the case of a maid who confessed to throwing a 1-year old baby out of the window. Sgt Sarah got transferred to CID to Kim's unhappiness.
2. Sean partners Sarah in a ‘dog-man’ case, Mike and Kim go in search of an underwear thief, and Su Lyn tries to get Herbert to see his mother.
3. Sparks fly between Mike and Kim when they team up on a case together. Meanwhile, Sarah gets Herbert to loosen up as he, softening to Su Lyn's attempts to reconcile him with his family, finally makes contact with his brother.
4. The team investigates the murder of PC Chong, a constable at a NPP. Two suspects were the OC of the NPP, Staff Sergeant Heng, and a successful and well-liked RC Chairman Winston. Through a sting operation, the team discovered that Winston killed PC Chong because he witnessed his interaction with a gangster who was using Winston's shop for storing heroin. Mike and Herbert went undercover as police constables in this episode and Herbert had to cut his hair for the role.
5. Kim and Sarah investigate the death of a top school swimmer whose body was found at the beach. The episode reveals how upset and envious Kim was with Sarah because the later was always first in sports and school. In the IPPT test, Alan outran everyone to win the $50 "Pang Prize".
6. Mike and Kim investigate the murder of a rag and bone man. While working on a drug-related case, Sarah finds herself attracted to Inspector Seah, a narcotics officer
7. Mike and Kim try to nail a man who's been going around, threatening people with an HIV-tainted needle. Also, Mike finds out that Kim likes him but turns her down
8. Alan and Herbert investigate a case involving a teenage girl gang. Meanwhile, Sean sets into motion the undercover plan to infiltrate a drug syndicate and find out who the top dogs are
9. Mike and Sarah investigate a businessman's murder and discover that some foreign workers had been paid to kill him. Meanwhile, Sean helps Martin with some drug deals to win the latter's trust.
10. Herbert and Alan investigate the murder of a man who organises the Children Karaoke Competition. A dismayed Alan learns that he's not being promoted.
11. Sean is told to kill an informer, which he does so as to gain respect from the gang. But it's also the start of his emotional downfall.
12. Sean has nightmares after killing an informer and, in his desperation, turns to drugs. Mike suspects something is wrong with Sean. Meanwhile, Kim and Alan draw closer to each other.
13. Mike investigates a murder where the abused wife is suspected of killing her husband. Sean manages to crack the syndicate and discovers that the corrupt officer turns out to be Inspector Lee. Meanwhile, Kim invites Alan out for a date.
14. Alan confides his disappointment at being passed over for a promotion to Kim, who thus feels closer to him. Mike takes Sarah out so as to help her get over Sean's betrayal. Meanwhile, Sean gets addicted to drugs.
15. While investigating a case with Alan, Sean loses control of himself and his drug problem is exposed. Meanwhile, Helen tries to court Mike who turns her down.
16. Sean goes on cold turkey and Kim helps him get over his addiction. Meanwhile, a spurned Helen threatens Mike.
17. Alan and Mike investigate a case where a series of women are being killed. Meanwhile, a spurned Helen freaks out and Mike tries to contain her, but to no avail. Later, she goes missing.
18. Mike and Sarah investigate the case of a dead abandoned baby. Meanwhile, Sean suffers a relapse and starts drinking again.
19. Mike and Sarah investigate the murder of a man who was found strangled in the restroom of a rundown hotel. Sean seeks help from Alcoholics Anonymous.
20. Mike and Sarah investigate a series of brutal murders of young women. Eventually they uncover a con operation that lures women with fengshui and black magic.
21. Margaret (Herbert's mother) drives into a boy who bullies her son Eric (Herbert's younger brother) and gets remanded for investigation. Herbert conciliates with Margaret who abandoned him when he was a kid. Love starts to blossom between Mike and Sarah, as well as between Sean and Kim.
22. A teenager holds a woman hostage in a supermarket. When Kim fails to talk him into releasing his victim, she shoots him dead. A police inquiry into the matter eventually lets Kim off the hook, but she's stabbed by an assailant on her way home.

== Media ==
Triple Nine is available on mewatch and on Netflix Singapore since November 2020, but it's not seen anymore as of 2025.

== Reception ==
The show was reportedly a hit when it aired throughout Singapore.
