= Ultimate Magic =

- Ultimate Magic Logo

- Ultimate Magic Season II, 2009

- Location within Singapore
- Address: 3B River Valley Road #01-08, The Foundry, The Arena @ Clarke Quay, Singapore 179021
- Location: The Arena @ Clarke Quay
- Coordinates: 1°17′25.6″N 103°50′42.7″E
- Owner: J C Sum & Magic Babe Ning
- Operator: Concept: Magic
- Type: theater
- Event: illusion
- Production: Concept: Magic

Construction
- Opened: 1 September 2008
- Closed: August 2009

Website
- www.ultimatemagic.sg

Ultimate Magic is Singapore’s first permanent illusion show at The Arena @ Clarke Quay. The show was Singapore’s only magic attraction and it was officially endorsed as a live attraction by the Singapore Tourism Board.

== Background ==
Produced and managed by Concept: Magic, Singapore’s only full service magic production house, the show opened in September 2008 and started its third season, Ultimate Magic: The Revolution on 2 May 2009 and ended in August 2009.

== Synopsis ==
Ultimate Magic starred Singapore professional magic duo, J C Sum & 'Magic Babe' Ning. The show is a partnership between the co-stars, Sum and Ning. The show is described as “Urban Illusions in the City” and is a magical personification of the characteristics of Singapore city.

== Stars ==
Sum and Ning's partnership as a professional magic duo has been acknowledged as “very groundbreaking and refreshing” and they were said to represent “the new faces of an age-old art form”. They are best known for a teleportation feat across Singapore River where three volunteers were teleported across Singapore River in just 2.5 seconds.

== Illusions in the show ==
Original illusions in the show (all seasons) include:

- J C's cross country teleportation
- Crystal Metamorphosis – J C & Ning's instant double teleportation
- Revollusion – An illusion with an 8-ft industrial fan
- Dreamscape: The Realm of Sandman
- Extreme Burn – An escape from a flaming spear
