= CozyCot =

Social networking website

CozyCot Pte. Ltd.
- Type: Privately held company
- Founded: 2001 (website), 2002 (company)
- Headquarters: 1 Scotts Road #26-05/07; Shaw Centre, Singapore
- Area served: East Asia and Southeast Asia (mainly Singapore)
- Key people: Nicole Yee; Clemen Chiang
- Products: CozyCot (website, newspaper, mook), various live events
- Revenue: $1.16 million (2009)
- Number of employees: 38
- Website: http://www.cozycot.com/

CozyCot is a social networking website for women from East Asia and Southeast Asia (especially Singapore). It was founded by Nicole Yee and Clemen Chiang in 2001, as a hobby website dedicated to Asian women. Subsequently, the concept of sharing product and service information and opinions gathered a steady community, turning it into a venture business. CozyCot users interact in the forum and by reviewing beauty products (the review system produced reviews for over 35,000 products), also in the live events organized by the staff. The importance of its review database is increased by an iPhone scanner software developed by CozyCot, which allows users to pull up product reviews from the website by capturing the barcodes with cameras in their iPhones. In April 2010, CozyCot launched the newspaper and, in June 2011, the mook with the same name.

== History ==
CozyCot started in November 2001 as an Internet portal based in Singapore, where members could post reviews and share shopping and fashion tips and opinions. It was created by Nicole Yee and her husband Clemen Chiang (the latter in charge of the tech development). As the online community grew, Nicole Yee began organizing live events for members, in order to get together. Several fragrance brands took notice of the growing community and offered to support her in terms of providing event venues. There followed other commercial projects (workshops, product launches, online shopping etc.), which (together with a presence of the website in the top 100,000 Alexa ranking) mooted the decision to turn it into a venture business. In 2002, Nicole Yee founded CozyCot Pte. Ltd., as the managing company of the portal, in 2007 she hired the first employee, then, in 2008, she invested $100,000 in the website. Its revenue exceeded US$1 million in 2009, with a 115% growth.

The community kept expanding, as readership of Singapore women’s magazines continued turning toward online content, developing the portal into Singapore's largest online women community for beauty, fashion and lifestyle, with over 500,000 unique visitors each month. It expanded also geographically, in the rest of East Asia and among Asian women from United States, Australia and New Zealand, CozyCot becoming one of the local websites "putting Singapore on the global map". Since 2006, forums.cozycot.com ranks first every year in the Hitwise Singapore 'Lifestyle - Womens Sites' industry (and from January - June, 2010 also in `Lifestyle - Beauty' industry) based on monthly average market share, at Hitwise Singapore Hitwise Top Ten Awards.

In October 2009, MindShare announced the launching of an online reality show on CozyCot. The show, named House Husbands, is focused on a group of men looking to prove they are equally adept in the boardroom as well as in the family’s baby room. The cast would compete in various parenting tasks for prizes.

The company developed also an offline presence, opening Ninki-Ô, a 1000-square-foot retail outlet in Orchard Central and launching the newspaper CozyCot.

In May 2010, CozyCot appointed Nielsen for web analytics and audience measurement (the website is audited by Nielsen since 2005). This produced Asia-Pacific Region’s first real time CRM database profiling and tracking, its results showing increasing orientation of the public towards online content, both in researching and in voicing opinions about products.

In 2012, CozyCot launched a new Malaysian forums section and a new Chinese article section.

=== 2010 funding ===
In 2010, CozyCot Pte. Ltd. attracted an undisclosed investment from Hong Kong's JDB Holdings, thus making the company majority-owned by JDB, one of the largest digital media networks in Asia (with investments in other regional digital platforms like JobsDB.com, Streetdirectory.com, 88DB.com and sgCarMart.com). The funding would permit a technology transfer, an increase of the number of employees and it would help the company expand in the region (with 2011 plans to expand to Malaysia and the Philippines).

== Community ==
The users of CozyCot, named "Cotters", interact in the forum and by reviewing beauty products, also in the live events organized by the staff. A system of accumulating points (according to the activity in the site) is enabled for giving rewards for members' support.

== Forum ==
The initial forum in the early years was mostly dedicated to sharing shopping and fashion tips and opinions. It expanded then to cover home and living, motherhood, career, finance, technology and weddings. These themes are termed "channels" (28 as of April 2009). The forum has been remarked for its diversity of topics, some (like those on spas and fragrances) noticeably missing from most other forums. The main language used is English, but there appear also (partial) postings in Chinese. A CozyCot debate on plastic surgery, with over 1000 comments and 8 million hits, has been covered in Hankook Ilbo, regarding the specific Chinese views on this topic and their cosmetic tourism in South Korea.

== Reviews ==
CozyCot has a product library of over 35,000 products, which are available for members' reviews. An iPhone scanner software allows users to pull up product reviews from CozyCot's website by capturing the barcodes with cameras in their iPhones.

== Events ==
CozyCot plays host to workshops, focus groups, road tests etc.

On its 9th anniversary (4 December 2010), the site started the campaign "Surrender Your Bras for a Cause", encouraging women to donate bras to those less fortunate in Southeast Asia, in the hope of making Singaporean women more aware of the lack of basic necessities like bras among women and young girls in neighbouring countries. On next year's anniversary, the campaign consisted in a mass shirt donation drive, in aid of the Star Shelter, a temporary refuge for women and children victims of family violence (under the Singapore Council of Women Organization).

At "LoveFest 2011", a speed dating event held in Orchard Central (8–9 October 2011), the feature that drew media attention was that the men participated blindfolded and they were encouraged to avoid questions related to age and looks. Also, both men and women were not allowed to discuss about occupation and financial status. According to CozyCot's founder and CEO, Nicole Yee, the idea was that "looks should not be the most important aspect in a relationship. There are more important elements such as the character of a person, in terms of the hobbies and personal taste, which are just as important in a relationship."

== Related publications ==
In April 2010, the newspaper CozyCot as launched, as a 25-pages free monthly publication with a print run of 200,000.

In June 2011, it was followed by a quarterly 188-page mook with the same name, a publication part magazine, part book, released in print, as well as on-line. The online version includes the additional features of interactivity and media content.

== Awards ==
CozyCot has won Singapore's First Women's Site Award at Hitwise Singapore Online Performance Award for five consecutive years since 2006. The website was also the winner of Singapore Women's Website category at Digital Media of the Year 2011.
