= Spiking (fintech) =

Social trading platform based in Singapore

- Developer: Aly Pte. Ltd.
- Release: 2016
- Operating system: iOS, Android
- Type: Social trading
- License: Free
- Website: spiking.com

Spiking is an AI platform that tracks institutional money flows and options activity in the US market, operated by Aly Pte. Ltd.

== Features ==
Spiking tracks the sophisticated investors from 10 stock markets in eight countries (ASX, HKEx, BSE, NSE, MYX, PSE, SGX, SET, HNX, HOSE) and sends users real-time notifications whenever these investors transact and make public their filings. The platform consolidates the latest disclosures published on these markets and sends them to mobile devices almost instantaneously. All information by public companies and bona fide investors is verified using machine-reading algorithms to scan stock exchange filings. The scan is done every minute, and the information is posted almost instantly on the app.

Spiking users can see who the top 20 shareholders of a company are, the price and quantity of their latest transactions, and the other stocks these investors have in their portfolios. The mobile app also allows users to 'follow' their favourite counters or celebrity investors, and keep tabs on their movements. The users can form private chat groups.

The app provides sophisticated investors (those who invest in more than 5 percent of a public-listed company) with resources to conduct due diligence, influence board decisions and access to more intimate knowledge than most other investors. It also aggregates recent news headlines, announcements, tweets and buy/sell activity of the companies and investors selected by the user. Spiking Forum organizes discussion threads by company for member discussions.

SpikingAI is available on AWS Marketplace and Google Cloud Marketplace.

=== TradeGPT ===
In October 2024, Spiking launched TradeGPT, an AI-driven platform that develops insights and tools for data-driven investment strategies. The computing infrastructure is provided by IBM Z systems, initially through the IBM Z ScaleUp Program. Previously, in 2023, Spiking was also selected for the fifth class of the IBM Hyper Protect Accelerator, in order to implement IBM's Hyper Protect technology for encryption and security. SpikingAI is available on AWS Marketplace and Google Cloud Marketplace.

== History ==
Clemen Chiang, Ph.D. (the CEO and founder of Aly Pte. Ltd.) developed the idea of this mobile app from his personal observations as a private investor of 15 years. The decision-making process often had to rely too much on speculations and rumors. In order to make better sense of unexplained spikes in market activity, he thought of a platform to consolidate big data and relevant information and he spent 20 months and $250,000 developing the app.

An early investor was Quest Ventures, China's leading venture fund for technology companies that have scalability and replicability in large internet communities. Spiking was also supported by a grant from the National Research Foundation, Prime Minister's Office, Singapore, under its i.JAM Reload Programme. It was elected to participate in the Startupbootcamp FinTech Pitch Day 2015 in Hong Kong, and Startupbootcamp Selection Days 2015, in Singapore. It was also one of the finalists of the Benzinga Fintech Awards 2015 in New York, for Research Platforms & Tools — Best in Class.

On 1 April 2016, Spiking was released for free download on the iOS App Store, providing financial information about 8,000 sophisticated investors operating on the Singapore Exchange (SGX). Later, an Android version was also launched on Google Play and other stock markets from Asia and Australia were included in the platform. At the moment of the launch in April 2016, the company expressed its intention to expand through seed funding into regional markets with high smart phone penetration. In September 2016, it exceeded its seed funding target of S$1 million ($732,828). Among the main investors were Andrew Chen, Douglas Foo, Koh Boon Hwee and Lim Ah Hock.

In October 2016, Spiking was the Gold Winner of Singapore infocomm Technology Federation Awards 2016 at the category Best Innovative Start-up (Early Stage). The award was given for the innovative approach to solving the asymmetrical information problem for retail investors of the stock market and for the display of a very international outlook, having the potential to grow big on the international stage.

On 13 March 2017, Spiking released the new version 3.0 iOS app, with new features as well as expansion into Bursa Malaysia. As a result of the release, it became No.1 on the Top Gross iPhone Apps (Finance) in Singapore on 23 March 2017. Spiking was one of Singapore's Hottest Startups 2017 (Singapore Business Review). As of 7 May 2017, Spiking was ranked 15 under iPhone - Free - Finance (Singapore) and ranked 57 under iPhone - Grossing - Finance (Singapore), while in Google Play Ranking was ranked 25 under Top Free - Finance (Malaysia).

In August 2018, a new seed and pre-A funding reached a total of S$2.23 million, necessary for further expansion of the platform, including by adding digital assets covered in the international cryptocurrency markets. Spiking raised more than US$30 million in the initial token offering for its blockchain platform, conducted in three phases, in October - December 2018.

== Stock markets tracked ==
- Australian Securities Exchange (ASX)
- Hong Kong Exchanges and Clearing (HKEx)
- India – Bombay Stock Exchange (BSE) and National Stock Exchange (NSE)
- Bursa Malaysia (MYX)
- Philippine Stock Exchange (PSE)
- Singapore Exchange (SGX)
- Stock Exchange of Thailand (SET)
- Vietnam – Hanoi Stock Exchange (HNX) and HoChiMinh Stock Exchange (HOSE)
