= Clemen Chiang =

Singaporean entrepreneur

- 郑文元
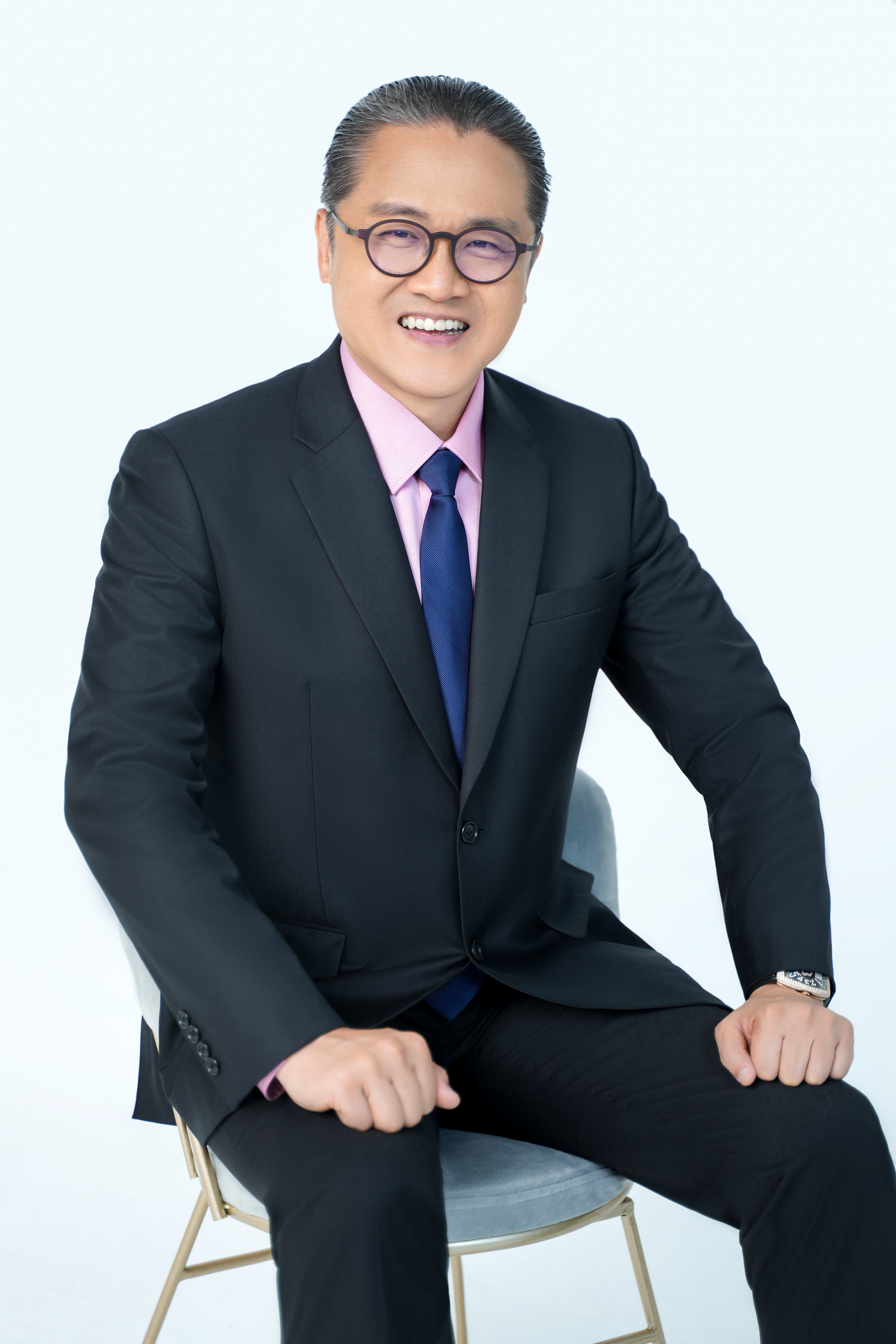
- Education: Victoria Junior College; Nanyang Technological University; University of Louisville (MBA); University of Canberra (Ph.D.)
- Known for: Spiking, CozyCot

Clemen Chiang (Chinese: 郑文元) is a Singaporean entrepreneur who is the co-founder of CozyCot and founder of Spiking. He is also a Member of the Board of Directors at Travelite Holdings Ltd. (SGX).

== Education ==
Clemen Chiang studied mathematics, physics, and economics at Victoria Junior College. In 2000, he received a bachelor's degree in Civil and Structural Engineering from the Nanyang Technological University and, in 2002, a Master of Business Administration with an emphasis in Entrepreneurship from the University of Louisville. In 2017, he graduated as a Doctor of Philosophy in Management from the University of Canberra, with a thesis examining the impact of viral marketing on social action within computer-mediated social network sites.

== Career ==
In 2001, Chiang and his wife Nicole Yee co-founded CozyCot, a social networking website for Asian women. He led the company's tech development. The portal became Singapore's largest online women community, in 2010 with over 500,000 unique visitors each month. It expanded also geographically, in the rest of East Asia and among Asian women from United States, Australia and New Zealand, becoming one of the local websites "putting Singapore on the global map". In 2010, CozyCot Pte. Ltd. attracted an undisclosed investment from Hong Kong's JDB Holdings, thus making the company majority-owned by JDB.

In 2012, Clemen Chiang and Nicole Yee brought for the first time in Singapore the concept of Dîner en Blanc, also a first for an Asian country. They continued to host it for a few more years.

Later, Chiang developed the social trading platform Spiking, launched in 2016. The idea grew from his personal observations as a private investor of 15 years. In order to make better sense of unexplained spikes in market activity, he thought of a platform to consolidate big data and relevant information and he spent 20 months and $250,000 developing the app. Spiking is an AI platform that tracks institutional money flows and options activity in the US market.

In October 2024, at the IBM Z Day conference, Chiang launched TradeGPT, an AI-driven platform offering insights and tools for data-driven investment strategies. The computing infrastructure is provided by IBM Z systems, while the encryption and security is backed by IBM's Hyper Protect technology. SpikingAI is available on AWS Marketplace and Google Cloud Marketplace.

== Personal life ==
Chiang is married to Nicole Yee and has three sons: Chiang Le, Chiang Yee and Chiang Loong. He plays rugby and is a taekwondo black-belt.

== Bibliography ==
- Spiking To The Moon: A Beginner’s Guide To Understanding Whales In The Cryptocurrency Market (2018)
- The Wall Came Down (2026) ISBN 978-981-94-7239-0
- Long Island (2026) ISBN 978-981-94-7822-4
- Nine Pages (2026) ISBN 978-981-94-7861-3
