= Sakae Sushi =

Singaporean restaurant serving Japanese cuisine

- The logo for Sakae Sushi, which depicts a green frog with the company's name
- Type: Private
- Genre: Japanese restaurant
- Founded: September 1997; 29 years ago
- Founder: Douglas Foo
- Headquarters: Singapore
- Website: www.sakaesushi.com.sg www.sakaesushi.com.my

Sakae Sushi (Kanji: 栄寿司) is a restaurant chain based in Singapore serving Japanese cuisine, and is the flagship brand of Sakae Holdings Ltd. Aimed at the low to mid-level pricing market, it offers sushi, sashimi, teppanyaki, yakimono, nabemono, tempura, agemono, ramen, udon, soba and donburi served either à la carte or via a sushi conveyor belt.

== History ==
In 1988, Douglas Foo meet his now wife, Koh Yen Khoo whilst working as a baker in a Delifrance cafe. During their courtship, the two would eat sushi regularly. However, Foo would "wince every time he had to foot the bill" as sushi was expensive back then. After pondering why sushi was not available to the general public despite its healthiness, he decided to create Sakae Sushi.

Its first outlet was opened in the OUB Centre, Raffles Place in September 1997 during the Asian financial crisis. It later opened its second outlet at The Heeren in Orchard Road. In December 1998, plans were revealed to open a new outlet at Wheelock Place in Orchard Road. However, it was also revealed that Sakae Sushi was experiencing a downturn in profit as it yet to have recuperate its investments, which takes 12–18 months to break even. Around May 1999, Sakae Sushi introduced its digital menu system, which was claimed by Foo to have been invented by a Singaporean company. If it was successful, then the concept would be implemented in Sakae Sushi's other outlets. Foo initially planned to have six outlets in Downtown Singapore but saw potential for expansion into the suburban areas and to turn Sakae Sushi into "the McDonald's of sushi". The first suburban outlet was opened in Eastpoint Mall in 2000.

During the 2000s, Sakae Sushi started to explore other markets. In 2001, the first overseas outlet was opened in Jakarta, Indonesia. By 2006, there were 31 outlets in Singapore and 12 in Malaysia, Indonesia, China, Thailand, and the Philippines. In 2008, it opened an outlet in the Chrysler Building, New York City. However, due to the 2008 financial crisis, they were forced to close the outlet in 2009.

In 2017, Sakae Sushi had closed 10 of its 46 restaurants in the past few months. It had not made a profit since 2015 due to a slow economy and a tough food-and-beverage industry. Sakae Sushi had 40 restaurants in Malaysia and another 20-plus more in the region.

Sakae Sushi's founder has said that he would one day like to expand operations into North Korea, because of the potential for effective monopoly power in the region.

As of December 2024, the chain has two restaurants in Singapore and two restaurants in Malaysia.

== Branding ==
=== Name ===
The name Sakae Sushi (Kanji: 栄寿司) is derived from the Japanese drink and dish sake and sushi, respectively. Foo wanted to make his brand easy to remember by consumers, so he chose those two words as customers would go there to eat sushi and drink sake. Moreover, Sakae also means growth in Japanese. In Mandarin, the brand's name is rong shou si, which symbolises longevity.

=== Logo ===
The logo depicts a cartoon frog with the Kanji word for Sake (栄) inside of it. It also displays the companies name at the bottom. Foo chose to use a frog as he felt that "the frog is a creature that likes clean environments, and [they wanted] to epitomise hygiene and cleanliness" Both the frog and the text is green as it symbolises healthy dining as well as Sakae Holding's green initiatives.

== See also ==
- List of Japanese restaurants
- List of sushi restaurants
