= Victoria Junior College =

College in Singapore founded 1984

Victoria Junior College 维多利亚初级学院 (Chinese) Maktab Rendah Victoria (Malay) விக்டோரியா தொடக்கக் கல்லூரி (Tamil)

Location
- 20 Marine Vista, 449035; Singapore; 1.30656°N 103.92061°E

Information
- Type: Government
- Motto: Latin: Nil Sine Labore (Nothing Without Labour)
- Established: 1876; 150 years ago (as Victoria School); 1984; 42 years ago (as Victoria Junior College)
- Founders: Old Victorians' Association; Victoria Advisory Committee
- Sister school: Victoria School; Cedar Girls' Secondary School
- School code: 0706
- Principal: Jeffrey Low
- Gender: Mixed
- Age range: 17–18
- Enrolment: 1456 (2021)
- Language: English
- Houses: 6
- Colours: Red; Yellow
- Song: Victorian Anthem
- Mascot: LaBear the Bear
- Yearbook: The Victorian
- Alumni: Old Victorians' Association
- Website: Victoria Junior College

Victoria Junior College (VJC) is a co-educational junior college in Singapore offering pre-university education to boarding and day-students. Founded in 1984, the school stands on Marine Vista, less than one kilometre from the affiliated Victoria School.

VJC is part of the Victoria-Cedar alliance and was ranked one of Singapore's top junior colleges in 2001

== History ==
Victoria Junior College was established in 1984 to replace the Pre-University classes in Victoria School (VS). The pioneer batch of 776 students was received with 51 teachers and 16 supporting staff. The outstanding results of the pioneer batch of students in the GCE 'A' Level examinations was to set the academic standard for succeeding generations of Victorians.

Over the years, VJC has widely been recognised, based on MOE rankings and entry scores, as one of the top three junior colleges in Singapore that offer the 'A' Levels. VJC was also ranked the top junior college in the Ministry of Education's (MOE) ST ranking of junior colleges in 1992 and 2001. More recently in 2019, it had the 4th toughest entry score amongst junior colleges offering the 'A' Levels.

In 1989, VJC was the first and, until 2005, the only junior college in Singapore to offer Theatre Studies and Drama as an 'A' Level subject. It also offered a university-level French curriculum as part of the Language Elective Programme until it was discontinued in 2006.

Since 2005, VJC has offered the Integrated Programme, allowing students to skip O Levels and proceed to junior college. The Victoria Integrated Programme (VIP) was implemented as a four-year programme starting from Secondary 3. In 2012 it was replaced by the six-year Victoria-Cedar Alliance Integrated Programme (VCA IP), in partnership with Cedar Girls' Secondary School and the affiliated Victoria School.

VJC was awarded the School Excellence Award in 2007, the top award in the MOE Masterplan of Awards framework.

== Principal ==
The college saw its first leadership change in 2001, when founding principal, Lee Phui Mun, stepped down after 18 years of service. She was succeeded by Chan Khah Gek, who was a former chemistry teacher in the school. In 2006, Chan Poh Meng, formerly a Superintendent at the Schools Division, took over the reins from Low. In December 2013, Ek Soo Ben, Deputy Director at the Standards and Research Academy of Singapore Teachers and a former Economics teacher at VJC, succeeded Chan.

Name of Principal	Years served
Lee Phui Mun	1984–2001
Chan Khah Gek	2001–2006
Chan Poh Meng	2006–2013
Ek Soo Ben	2013–2021
Jeffrey Low	2022–Present

== Academics ==
Victoria Junior College's two-year curriculum culminates in the Singapore GCE Advanced Level examinations. Students take up to four Higher 2 subjects and read two compulsory Higher 1 subjects - General Paper and Project Work - in their first year, and may elect to read additional Higher 3 subjects in the second year. Approximately 30% of students read Higher 1 Mother Tongue Language in their first year too. Home to the East Zone Science and Technology Centre, the college also sent the first Singapore school team to participate in the International Science and Engineering Fair in 2004.

VJC is one of the three schools in Singapore that holds the BioMedical Admissions Test (BMAT).

== Achievements ==
=== Sports ===
In 2017, VJC won the A-division championship title for girls' football, boys' floorball, boys' wushu and hockey girls. This was the fifth straight title for the girls' football team, and their ninth in the last ten years.

In 2018, VJC won the A-division championship title for both the boys' and girls' football, hockey girls and wushu boys. This was VJC's 16th consecutive year winning the A-division girls' hockey.

In 2019, VJC won the A-division championship title for girls' football, girls' floorball, girls' wushu and girls' rockclimbing.

In 2022, VJC won the A-division championship title for boys' floorball, girls' football, boys' football, and girls' netball. This was the eighth straight title for the girls' floorball team.

In 2026, VJC girls’ football team won their 12th straight A Division girls’ football title in a 2–1 comeback.

=== Performing Arts ===
==== Choir ====
The VJC Choir was the first school choir from Singapore to win an international choir competition. It beat 30 top choirs from other parts of the world in the 800-year-old Cardigan Eisteddfod Competition in Wales in 1990, and for its outstanding contribution to music in Singapore, the VJC Choir was presented with the 1990 Guinness Stout Effort Award.

In 2004, Victoria Junior College Choir represented Singapore in the World Choir Games held in Bremen, Germany and won Gold Medals in all three contested categories, namely Musica Sacra, Contemporary Music and Open Mixed. It emerged as the Olympic Champion of the Open Mixed Category, and second placing in the Musica Sacra and Contemporary Music categories.

In 2006, VJC choir won the esteemed Audience Prize and Grand Prix Award in the 9th Concorso Corale Internazionale (International Choir Competition) held in Riva Del Garda, Italy. The VJC Choir won Gold for both the categories they competed in - Musica Sacra and Mixed Youth, and emerged as Category Winner for the latter. It is the first time an Asian Choir has won the grand prize and one of a few choirs in the world to win both the Audience Prize and Grand Prix Award together.

In 2018, VJC choir competed in the Asia Cantate and clinched the Grand Prize. In addition, they also won two other categories—the Mixed Voices Choir (Open) and the Mixed Voices Choir (Senior Youth).

As of December 2023, it was ranked 5th in the world in the mixed choirs category of the INTERKULTUR World Rankings.

==== Dance ====
In 2008, the VJC Dance Ensemble competed at the Barcelona Dance Awards, clinching second place for choreography and the Best Theatre Performance.

VJC Dance Ensemble achieved overall grand champion in the 2010 Lecco Danza, an international dance competition held in Italy. They were awarded first prize in the contemporary senior dance group category and first runners-up in the hip-hop group category.

In 2012, VJC dancers were champions in the Jazz Dance Small Group category at the 9th World Dance Olympiad in Moscow, Russia.

In the 2014 Crown International Dance Festival in Melbourne, Australia, the dance ensemble placed first in all the three categories that it participated in, namely Contemporary, Modern Expression and Hip Hop.

==== Symphonic Band ====
In 2008, the VJC Symphonic Band competed at the New York Band and Orchestra Festival, clinching the Gold Award. The Band performed at the Carnegie Hall for the competition, and was also invited to perform at Central Park in New York days before the competition.

== Affiliations ==
VJC is affiliated to Victoria School, an all-boys school founded in 1876.

VJC provided VS students an option to continue a two-year junior college education within the Victorian family after the completion of their secondary education. VS students choosing to enter VJC get two bonus points off their GCE 'O'-Level L1R5 academic aggregate.

Since the 2012 school year, VS and Cedar Girls' Secondary School have offered the Victoria-Cedar Alliance Integrated Programme (VCA IP) option. After finishing Secondary 4, 160 students from each school continue on to VJC automatically.

== Alumni ==
The alumni body, Old Victorians' Association (OVA), was established in 1941. It serves as a channel for former students of Victoria School and Victoria Junior College to continue to associate with their alma mater.

The OVA supports the activities undertaken by the schools, assists needy students, and promotes sports, social and cultural activities among members.

In 2009, OVA organised the inaugural combined VS and VJC gala concert, with a 260-strong cast comprising both students and celebrity alumni, at the Esplanade Concert Hall.

In 2011, OVA organised the Victoria School 135th Anniversary Celebration Dinner at the former VS campus at Tyrwhitt Road.

== Notable alumni ==
=== Politics ===
- Lawrence Wong, Prime Minister of Singapore, Minister for Finance, and Member of Parliament for Marsiling-Yew Tee GRC
- David Neo, Minister for Culture, Community and Youth, Senior Minister of State for Education and Member of Parliament for Tampines GRC; former Chief of Army, Singapore Armed Forces
- Goh Pei Ming, Senior Minister of State for Home Affairs, and Social and Family development and Member of Parliament for Marine Parade-Braddell Heights GRC
- Gan Siow Huang, Minister of State and Member of Parliament for Marymount SMC; first female general of the Singapore Armed Forces
- Syed Harun Alhabsyi, Senior Parliamentary Secretary for Education and National Development and Member of Parliament for Nee Soon GRC; former Nominated Member of Parliament
- Chong Chieng Jen, former Deputy Minister, Malaysia
- Henry Kwek, Member of Parliament for Kebun Baru SMC
- Nadia Ahmad Samdin, Member of Parliament for Ang Mo Kio GRC
- Ng Shi Xuan, Member of Parliament for Sembawang GRC
- Alex Yam, Member of Parliament for Marsiling-Yew Tee GRC and Mayor of North West CDC
- Douglas Foo, former Nominated Member of Parliament
- Janice Koh, former Nominated Member of Parliament
- Jean See, former Nominated Member of Parliament
- Nicole Seah, opposition politician
- Tony Tan Lay Thiam, opposition politician

=== Military/Police ===
- How Kwang Hwee, Commissioner of Police

=== Business and Corporate ===
- Kwek Kok Kwong, former chief executive officer, NTUC LearningHub
- Lam Yi Young, chief executive officer, Singapore Business Federation

=== Arts ===
- Maddy Barber, radio presenter
- Boon Hui Lu, singer-songwriter and actress
- Georgina Chang, radio personality, television broadcaster, and newspaper columnist
- Pamelyn Chee, actress and photographer
- Felicia Chin, actress
- Glenda Chong, news presenter
- Michelle Chong, film producer, director and actress
- Joanna Dong, jazz singer, actress and presenter
- Natalie Hennedige, playwright
- Ho Yeow Sun (Sun Ho), singer and actress; pastor
- Lee Teng, actor and presenter
- Sonny Liew, comic artist/illustrator; only Singaporean to have won the Eisner Award
- Rebecca Lim, actress
- Ling Kai, singer-songwriter
- Lunarin, musicians
- Gen Neo, singer-songwriter, producer and composer
- Jasmine Ng, producer and director
- Nuraliza Osman, lawyer and beauty queen
- Joanne Peh, actress
- Diana Ser, host, journalist, presenter and actress
- Jasmine Sim, actress and model
- ShiLi & Adi, musicians
- J C Sum, Illusionist and illusion designer
- Kirsten Tan, film director and screenwriter
- Tan Pin Pin, film director
- Kelvin Tong, film director, producer and screenwriter
- Jerry Yeo, former actor and host

=== Sports ===
- Anders Aplin, first Singaporean footballer to play in the J2 League and in Japan
- Dinah Chan, former national road and track cyclist
- Kampton Kam, national track and field athlete; national record holder for high jump, 2025 and indoor high jump, 2023
- Glenn Kweh, national footballer
- Della Lee, national squash coach and former professional squash player
- Gavin Lee, head coach, Singapore national football team
- Vanessa Lee, national track and field athlete; national record holder for 3000 m steeplechase, 2024 5000 m, 2024 and 10 km (road), 2024
- Mah Li Lian, winner, Asian Individual Squash Championships, 1988, 1990, 1992 and 1994; Sportswoman of the Year, 1989 and 1991
- Esther Tan, Singapore's first female naval diver and adventure racing athlete
- Lance Tan, former national track and field athlete and former national track cyclist; national record holder for team sprint and team pursuit, 2017
- Chris Yip-Au, former national women football player and the current head coach of the Seychelles women's national team

==== Olympians ====
- Koh Seng Leong, Olympian (Sailing), 2000 Summer Olympics and 2008 Summer Olympics
- Denise Lim, Olympian (Sailing), 2016 Summer Olympics
- Lo Man Yi, Olympian (Sailing), 2008 Summer Olympics
- Deborah Ong, Olympian (Sailing), 2008 Summer Olympics
- Sara Tan, Olympian (Sailing), 2016 Summer Olympics
- Toh Liying, Olympian (Sailing), 2008 Summer Olympics
- Elizabeth Yin, Olympian (Sailing), 2012 Summer Olympics

=== Others ===
- Clemen Chiang, entrepreneur
- Adam Khoo, entrepreneur, author and trainer
- Willin Low, restaurateur and chef

=== President's Scholars ===
Name	Year
Sng Chern Wei	1990
Brandon Lee Tian Boon	1991
Nicholas Tay Weizhe	2009
Chow Yi Ling	2010
Siow Mein Yeak	2019
