= Clarke Quay =

Coordinates: 1°17′24.06″N 103°50′45.92″E

- Subzone of Singapore River Planning Area

Name transcription(s)
  - Chinese: 克拉码头
  - Pinyin: Kèlā Mǎtóu
  - Malay: Clarke Quay
  - Tamil: கிளார்க் கீ
- Interactive map of Clarke Quay
- Country: Singapore

Clarke Quay is a historical riverside quay in Singapore, located within the Singapore River Planning Area. The quay is situated upstream from the mouth of the Singapore River and Boat Quay.

== Etymology ==
Clarke Quay was named after Sir Andrew Clarke, Singapore's second Governor and Governor of the Straits Settlements from 1873 to 1875, who played a key role in positioning Singapore as the main port for the Malay states of Perak, Selangor and Sungei Ujong.

Clarke Quay is also the name of a road along the quay, part of which has since been converted into a pedestrian mall. Clarke Street, located next to Clarke Quay, was officially named in 1896, and was originally two streets known simply as East Street and West Street in north Kampong Malacca. Similar to Clarke Quay, Clarke Street has since been converted into a pedestrian mall.

Clarke Street is known in Hokkien as Gī-hok Kong-si āu (義福公司后), lit. 'behind the Gi Hok Kongsi'. The new Gi Hok Kongsi was near Carpenter Street. Another Hokkien name, which only refers to the Southern bank around Read Bridge area, is Chhâ-chûn-thâu (柴船頭), lit. 'jetty for boats carrying firewood'. Small tongkangs carrying firewood from Indonesia berthed at this jetty. The firewood trade was primarily a Teochew enterprise.

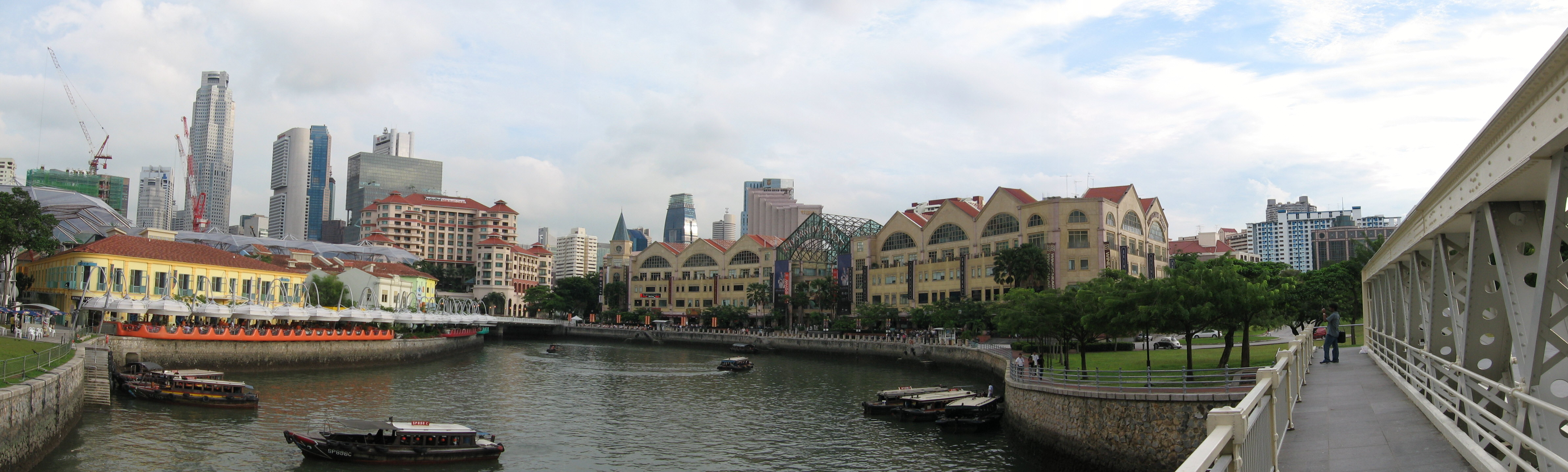
Panoramic view of Singapore River, with Clarke Quay on the left (northern) bank and Riverside Point on the right (southern) bank. Photograph taken from Ord Bridge, which can be seen on the extreme right.

== History ==
The Singapore River has been the centre of trade since modern Singapore was founded in 1819. During the colonial era, Boat Quay was the commercial centre where barge lighters would transport goods upstream to warehouses at Clarke Quay.

At the height of its prosperity, dozens of bumboats jostled for mooring space beside Clarke Quay. This continued well into the later half of the 20th century. By this time, the Singapore River had also become very polluted. The government decided to relocate cargo services to a new modern facility in Pasir Panjang. The bumboats and lorries departed to their new home and Clarke Quay fell silent.

The government then cleaned up the Singapore River and its environment from 1977 to 1987. Plans were made to revamp the area and turn it into a flourishing commercial, residential and entertainment precinct. These plans took into serious consideration the historical value of Clarke Quay, making it mandatory that new buildings complement the historical character of the area and that certain old buildings be restored.

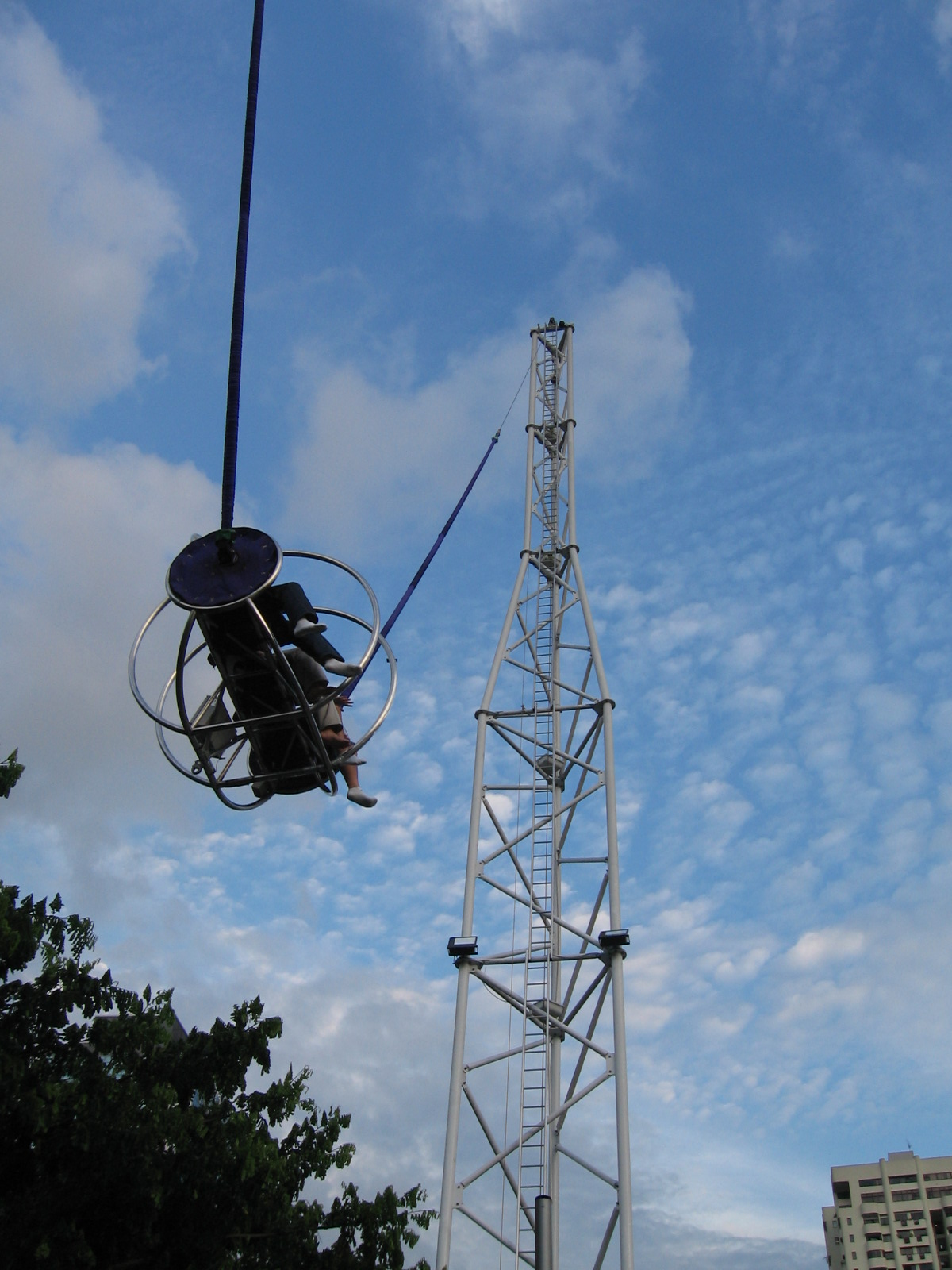
leftG-MAX reverse bungee

Clarke Quay Festival Village, the biggest conservation project for the Singapore River, was developed and officially opened on 10 December 1993. Clarke Quay Festival Village was managed by Clarke Quay Pte Ltd, a subsidiary of DBS Land. In 2000, DBS Land merged with Pidemco Land to form CapitaLand and management of Clarke Quay went to CapitaLand.

In 1996, the advertising agency Saatchi & Saatchi, and their sister company Zenith, moved into Clarke Quay as the pioneers to develop a creative hub. Two years later, they were awarded Ad Age International Agency of the Year. They had taken over the karaoke Party Doll premises.

Ten years later, works were commenced to revamp the Clarke Quay area to give the place a better tenant mix. The development also saw major changes to the exterior and riverside areas.

=== Redevelopment ===
In 2003, CapitaLand hired British architectural firm Alsop Architects to revamp Clarke Quay. The firm was commissioned to redesign the shophouse facades, streetscapes and riverfront dining areas in two development phases. The newly redeveloped Clarke Quay consistently attracts over 2 million visitors a year and is a major social and tourist component of brand Singapore. Crucial to its success is the moderation of the micro-climate through the design of shading and cooling systems which reduce the ambient temperature by 4 degrees Celsius while enhancing the riverfront and streets with visual interests. The project won in 2007 Cityscape Architectural Review Award (Tourism, Travel & Transport – Built) and the Cityscape Asia Awards, Best Waterfront Development in 2008.

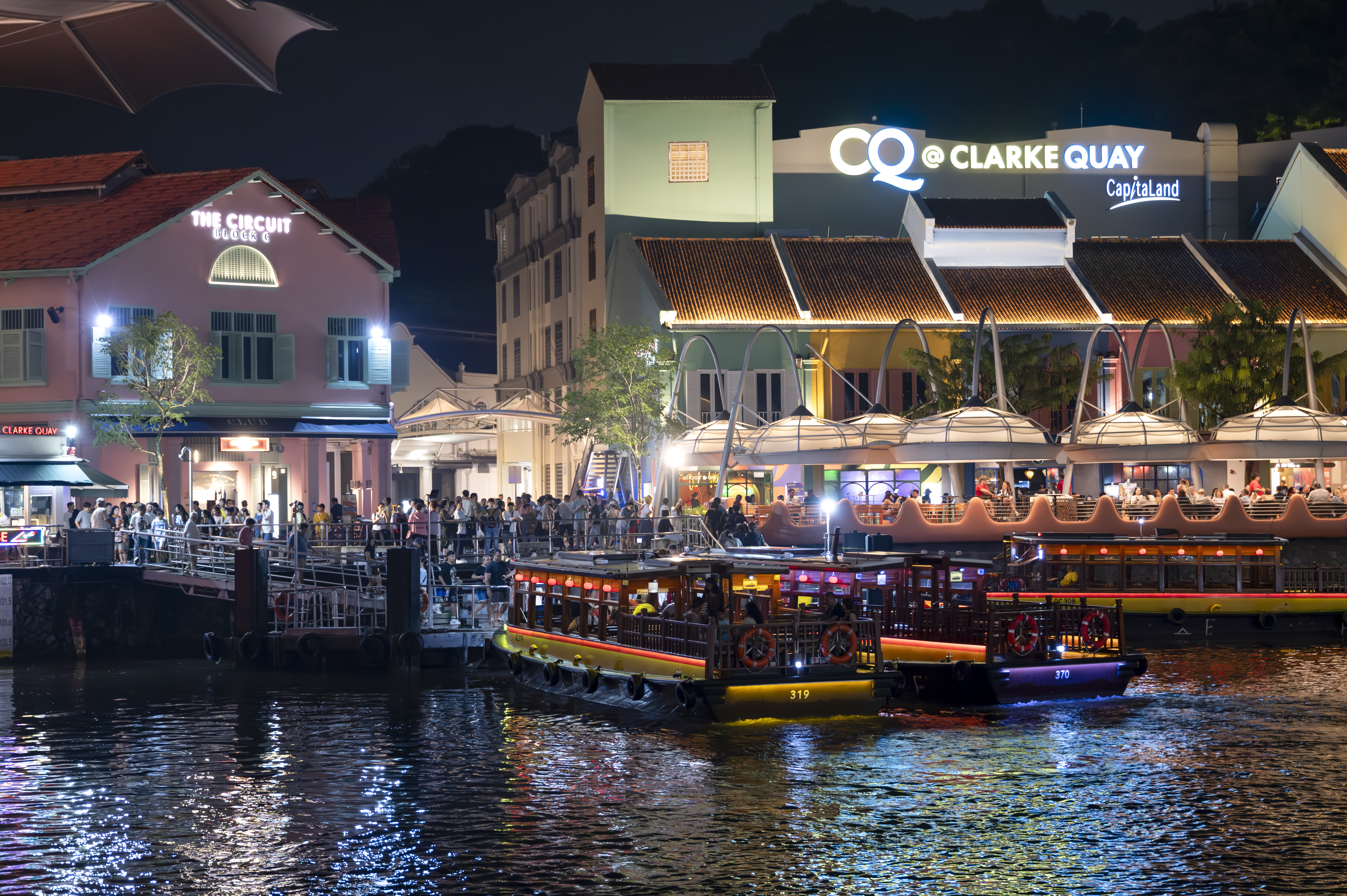
CQ @ Clarke Quay in April 2024.

The Satay Club and a number of establishments vacated Clarke Quay to make way for new tenants.

A new SOHO concept development and shopping centre called Clarke Quay Central, above the MRT station, was completed in 2007.

In July 2012, Hong Kong lifestyle retail store GOD opened a 6,000 square foot flagship store in the Quay. It closed on 26 April 2015.

In 2013, alcohol licensing rules limited sales of liquor till 4am on Sundays and public holidays and by 3am the rest of the week, due to a rise in violent crimes in Clarke Quay. With the new rules, public order incidents in the area had been significantly reduced. While incidents had reduced, some tenants blamed the reduced hours affected their operations and the rules were hurting their businesses and had called for a review of the rules. In August 2018, a trial was done to extend sales of liquor by an additional hour, till 4am, for selected nightclubs and bars on all Fridays. However, in January 2019, the trial was ended as crimes had increased by seven percent over the same period compared to the previous year, with the rules reverted.

On 17 December 2016, Zouk opened at ClarkeQuay after moving from its previous location at Jiak Kim Road.

=== Upgrading ===
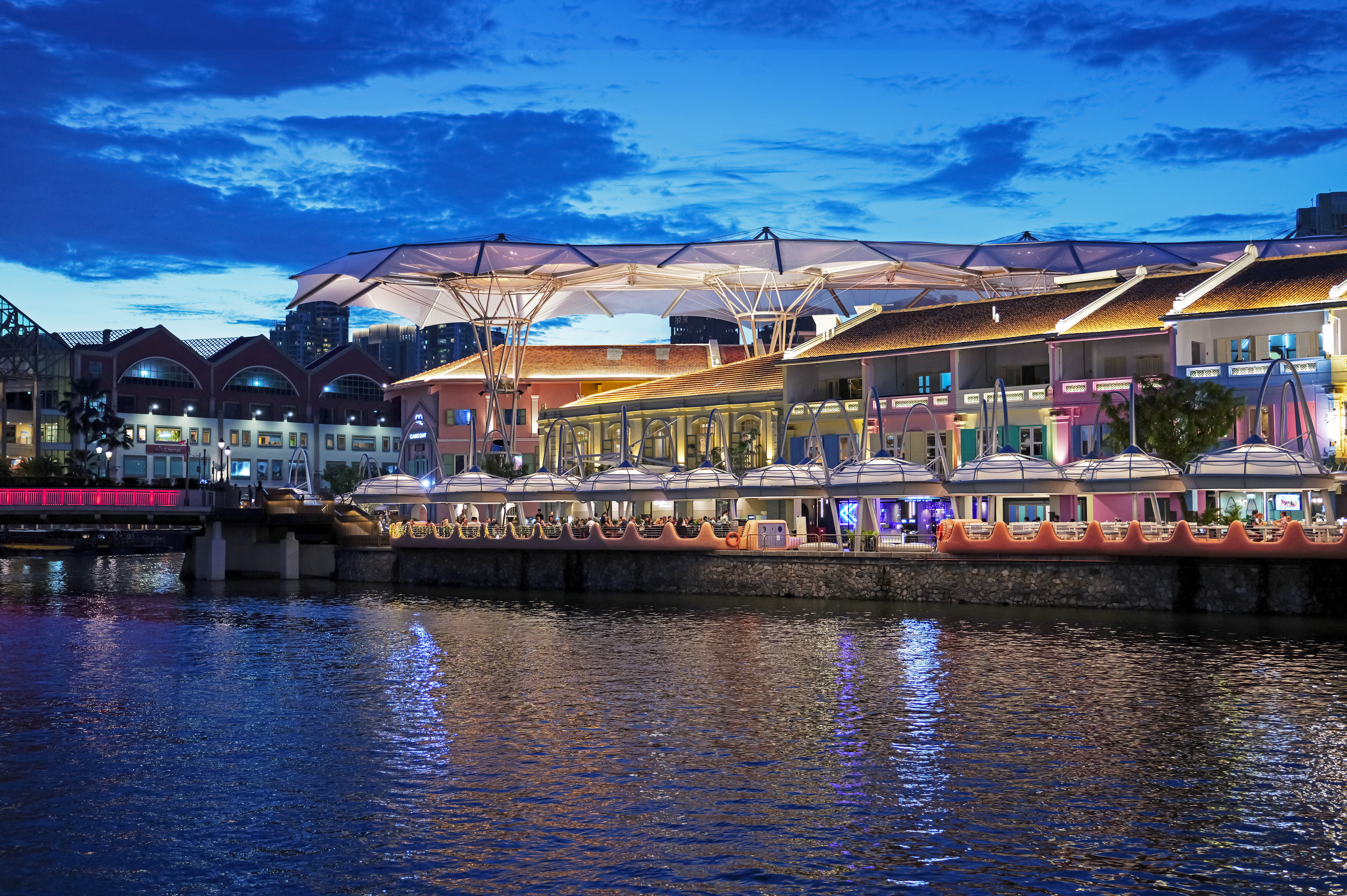
Upgraded Angel Canopies over the rebranded CQ @ Clarke Quay.

On 26 April 2024, Clarke Quay officially reopened as CQ @ Clarke Quay after a rejuvenation exercise that began in August 2022. The exercise included upgrading of the Angel Canopies over the inner streets for better thermal control and lower energy usage.

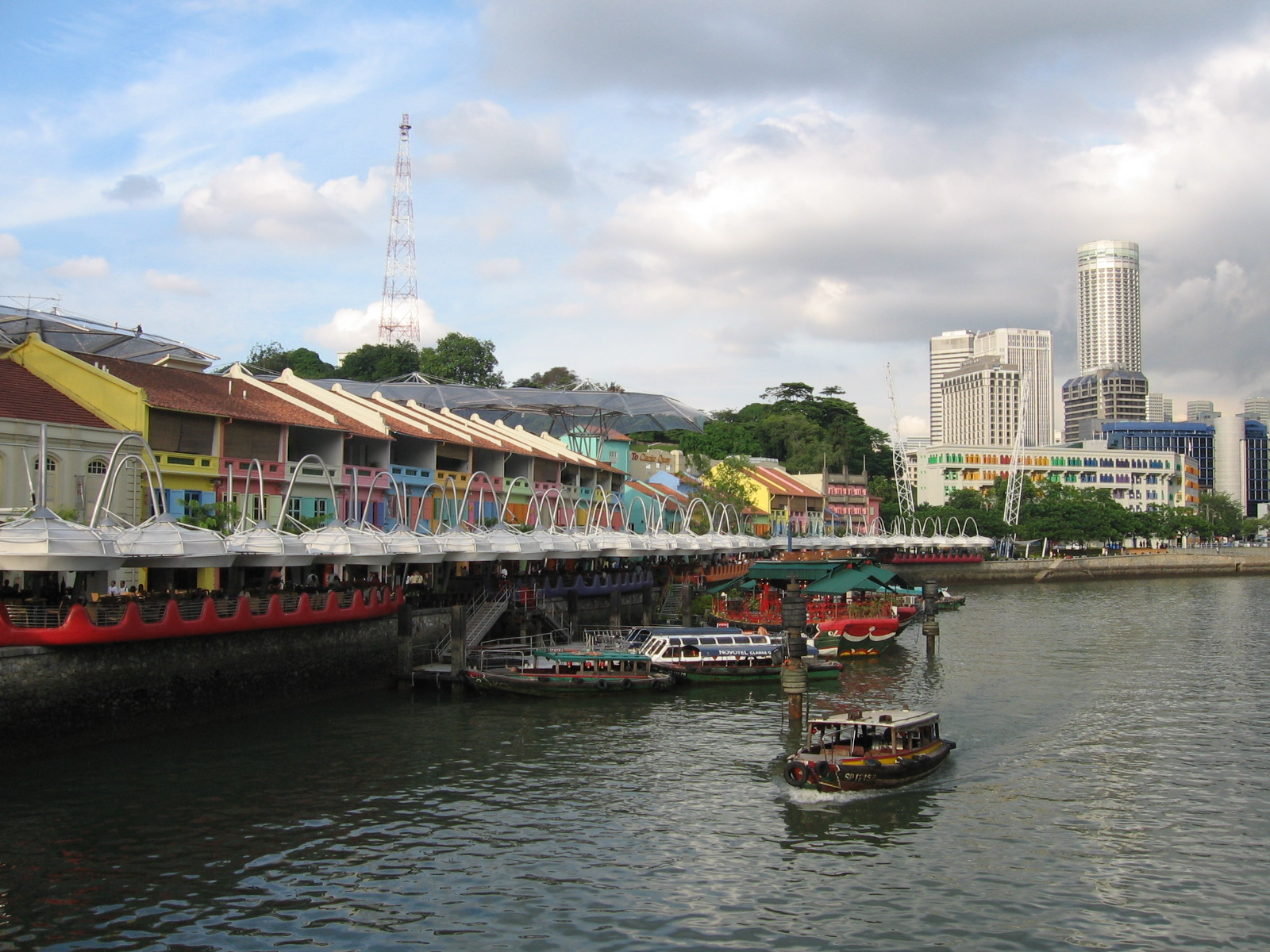
Clarke Quay today

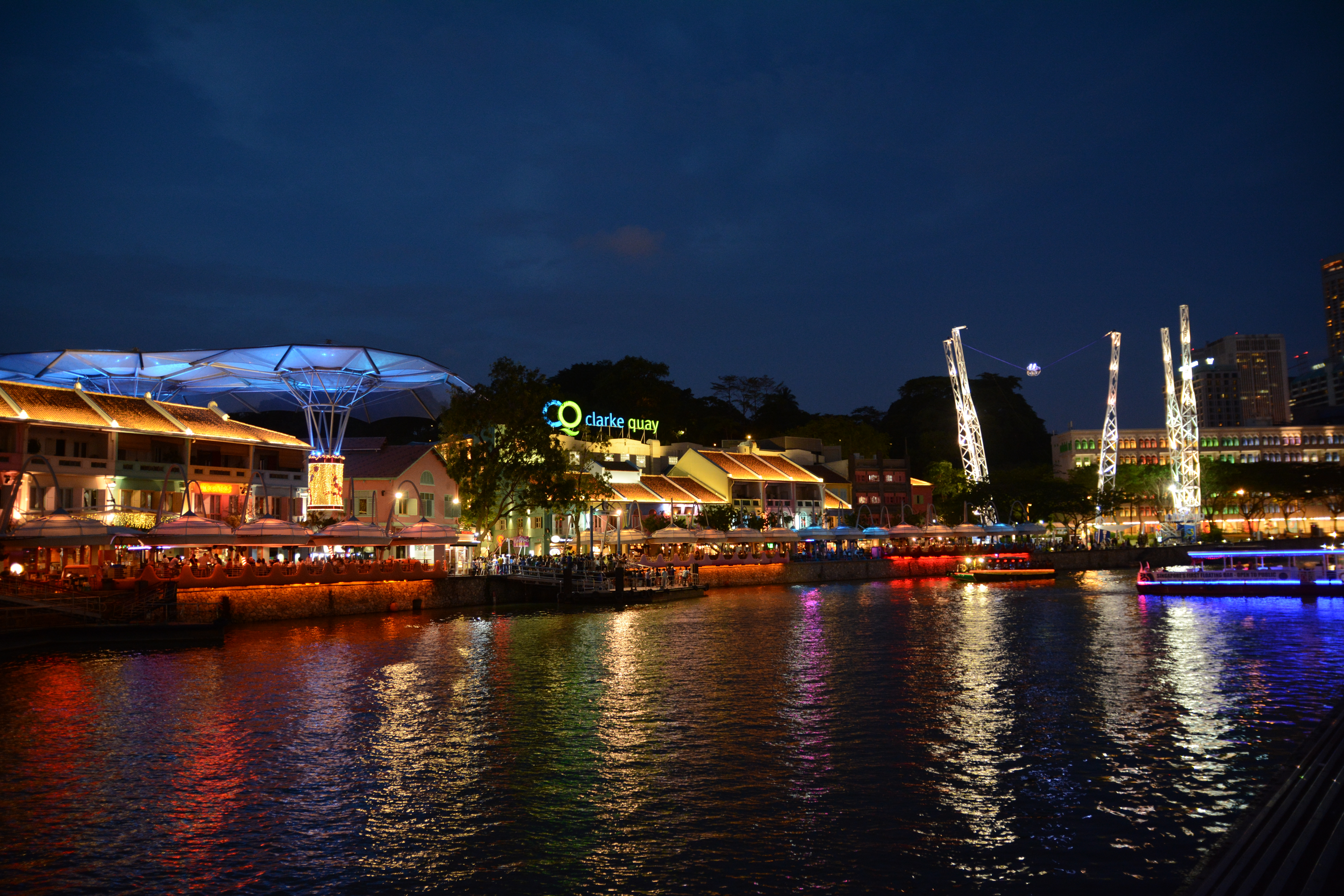
Clarke Quay at night

At present, five blocks of restored warehouses house various restaurants and nightclubs. There are also moored Chinese junks that have been refurbished into floating pubs and restaurants. The Cannery is one of the anchor tenants of the place. There are over 5 different concepts in one block. Another anchor tenant, The Arena, will be home to Singapore's first Permanent Illusion Show starring J C Sum and 'Magic Babe' Ning. The G-MAX reverse bungee, the first in Singapore, is located at the entrance which opened in November 2003.

Notable restaurants and nightclubs include Hooters and Indochine. River cruises and river taxis on the Singapore River can be accessed from Clarke Quay.

After the rejuvenation exercise that began in August 2022, Clarke Quay, now known as CQ @ Clarke Quay, features three zones and a new mix of clients that rebrands the attraction as a “day-to-night” destination with pet-friendly amenities and new tenants like Fairprice Finest. Warehouses at Block B were also decorated with a new mural by artists Yip Yew Chong and tobyato.

== Transport ==
Clarke Quay MRT station on the North East line is located within the vicinity.

== Sources ==
- National Heritage Board (2002), Singapore's 100 Historic Places, Archipelago Press, ISBN 981-4068-23-3
- Victor R Savage, Brenda S A Yeoh (2003), Toponymics – A Study of Singapore Street Names, Eastern Universities Press, ISBN 981-210-205-1
