= Adam Khoo =

Singaporean businessman

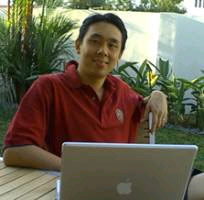
- Born: Adam Khoo Yean Ann; 8 April 1974 (age 52); Singapore
- Education: National University of Singapore (BA)
- Occupations: Entrepreneur, educator, investor

YouTube information
- Channel: AdamKhoo
- Years active: 2014–present
- Genres: Trading, investing
- Subscribers: 1.02 Million
- Views: 48 million
- Last updated: June 10, 2023
- Website: www.adam-khoo.com

Adam Khoo
- Traditional Chinese: 邱緣安
- Simplified Chinese: 邱缘安
Transcriptions
Standard Mandarin
- Hanyu Pinyin: Qiū Yuán'ān

Adam Khoo is a Singaporean entrepreneur, author and educator. He is the co-founder and Chief Master Trainer of Adam Khoo Learning Technologies Group. His business interests include financial education, corporate training, learning centers and youth education.

== Background and education ==
Khoo was born on 8 April 1974, to Vince Khoo and Betty L. Khoo-Kingsley. He did poorly in his PSLE examinations, and studied at Ping Yi Secondary School before doing his A Levels at Victoria Junior College. Khoo graduated with an honors degree in business administration from the National University of Singapore (NUS).

He also served as a Ground-Based Air Defence officer in 165 Squadron, RSAF.

== Career ==
=== Early business ventures ===
While still in secondary school, Khoo started a mobile disco business with friends, creating music and providing entertainment services for parties.

After completing National Service with the RSAF at age 21, Khoo partnered with three friends from the National University of Singapore and founded an event management company, Creatsoul Entertainment. The company organized hops, jams and other entertainment activities for individuals, companies and organizations, and was later re-registered as Event Gurus Pte Ltd, an event management company.

=== Motivational training ===
Khoo has coached insurance agents and marketing managers in sales boosting techniques. In 2002, he co-founded Adam Khoo Learning Technologies Group and taught Neuro-linguistic programming (NLP) to working professionals. In 2004, he authored a book on NLP, Master Your Mind, Design Your Destiny

=== Youth educator ===
While still in university, Khoo authored the book I Am Gifted, So Are You! with a foreword by Tony Buzan. The book, which covers studying strategies and motivational lessons for students, became a national best-seller in Singapore and was translated into 12 languages. In 2003, Khoo created the I Am Gifted! learning camp for children and teenagers.

=== Financial educator ===
Khoo is the creator of Value Momentum Investing, an investment strategy that combines fundamental analysis and technical analysis.

In 2002, Khoo and Patrick Cheo founded Adam Khoo Learning Technologies Group (AKLTG), a training and education center based in Singapore. The training center offers programs in finance, personal transformation, children & youth, corporate and school training conducted in various South East Asian countries.

In 2009, during the US bear market, Khoo co-authored the book Profit from the Panic called the bottom of the stock market crash. The book became a national best-seller in Singapore.

In 2017, Khoo founded the Piranha Profits online school for investors and traders worldwide. Piranha Profits is led by Master Trainer Adam Khoo as founder and is supported by a financial education team including other mentors like Bang Pham Van, Alson Chew and YY. With Piranha Profits, Adam also co-host annual events such as the Black Market 2025.

== Controversy ==
In 2019, Khoo became the subject of public criticism following a Facebook post regarding an airport security screening experience. In the post, he described being frisked by a female security officer, whom he referred to as “fortunately attractive”, and suggested that she appeared to be “enjoying herself” during the procedure. He also questioned why male security officers were not permitted to conduct similar searches on female passengers, describing the situation as a “double standard”. The post drew significant backlash online and was later removed from Facebook.

His methods of motivational training were also considered controversial. He would allegedly tell pupils to imagine the death of their parents, using this as a "motivational tool" to study harder. His use of NLP is also famously divisive.

== Personal life ==
He is married with two daughters.
