= Ning Cai (magician) =

Singaporean magician, mentalist, and writer

- 蔡嬣
- Ning Cai performing magic in front of an expat at temper. Wine Room & Lounge in Singapore on 8 September 2026
- Born: Cai Ning; 16 October 1982 (age 44); Singapore
- Other names: Magic Babe Ning; Mind Magic Mistress
- Citizenship: Singaporean
- Education: Ngee Ann Polytechnic; RMIT University; University of Edinburgh
- Occupations: Writer, Entrepreneur, Magician, Mentalist, Model
- Years active: 2006–present
- Known for: South East Asia's first professional female magician
- Notable work: Adventures of 2 Girls (2012) - With Pamela Ho; Who Is Magic Babe Ning? (2015); Game of Thoughts: Understanding Creativity Through Mind Games (2016) - with John Teo; Magicienne: A Novel (2016) - With Don Bosco; The Savant Trilogy (2018-2022)
- Spouse: (m. 2014)
- Children: 1

Chinese name
- Chinese: 蔡嬣
Transcriptions
Standard Mandarin
- Hanyu Pinyin: Cài Níng
- Website: ningthing.com

Ning Cai (Chinese: 蔡嬣; pinyin: Cài Níng; born 16 October 1982) is a Singaporean professional magician, mentalist, and a Singapore Literature Prize-nominated author.

== Overview ==
Cai is best recognized for her illusionist and escapologist stage character Magic Babe Ning and was named by Channel News Asia as Southeast Asia's first professional female magician. Cai has been credited with popularizing magic in Singapore.

In October 2014, Cai announced her retirement from performing as Magic Babe Ning to focus on her writing career. Her 2015 autobiography Who Is Magic Babe Ning? was published soon after, and book was nominated for the Singapore Literature Prize in 2016.

== Early life and education ==
Cai was born in Singapore on 16 October 1982. She is the eldest of three sisters. She studied at Methodist Girls School and competed in the Australian Mathematics Competition of 1997.

She attended Ngee Ann Polytechnic, where she was graduated with a diploma in Film, Sound and Video, as she intended to work as a television producer and writer. The Polytechnic would later inducted Cai into their inaugural Hall of Fame in 2011, along with fellow graduates of the School of Film Media Studies, DJs Jamie Yeo and Justin Ang, one of the radio presenter duo of The Muttons. Cai graduated from RMIT University with the Bachelor of Arts in Mass Communication.

With the support from the 2018 National Arts Council (NAC) Arts Scholarship, Cai graduated with a distinction in Creative Writing at the University of Edinburgh, Scotland on the following year in November 2019.

== Career in magic and entertainment ==
Ning Cai as Magic Babe Ning at "The Impossible 4D Prediction" on 22 Jan 2010

Cai gained recognition for the magic tricks that she honed after watching David Copperfield and Princess Tenko from the age of 5. In 2006, she joined a local magic competition and was placed second runner up. This win fuelled her desire to become a full-time professional performer.

Cai was acknowledged as "Singapore’s only professional female magician" by publications including The Straits Times, Lianhe Zaobao, The New Paper, My Paper, Mediacorp Channel 8 News and Lianhe Wanbao. She disliked being typecast as the typical female who only performed magic with silks, flowers or rabbits, so over the years she incorporated fire-eating, samurai swords, fire balls and weapons onto her shows.

Cai formed a collaboration with her manager J C Sum in various illusion shows across Asia, they had helped put Singapore on the world map with their daring magic performances and captivating illusions for a myriad of renowned events. By 2008, Cai and Sum were the highest paid magicians in Singapore. In July 2008, they established the Ultimate Magic, Singapore's first permanent illusion show at The Arena in the entertainment district of Clarke Quay. The illusion show would later closed in August 2009.

Their noteable events included:

- 5 July 2008: The Impalement Cage, as part of the launch of the show Ultimate Magic, Cai escaped blindfolded from a locked steel cage under a bed of 13 falling spikes within 90 seconds in front of 4,000 people.
- 24 September 2008: The Impossible Teleportation, Cai and Sum teleported three people across the river in 2.5 seconds as part of the F1 Singapore Grand Prix 2008 season.
- 27 June 2009: The Impossible Record, which served as a closing finale for the 2009 Singapore River Festival, Cai and Sum set a Singapore Book of Records milestone by staging 15 grand illusions in 5 minutes at the Singapore River Festival finale.
- 22 January 2010: The Impossible 4D Prediction, in which Cai accurately predicted winning lottery numbers a week in advance, making "Magic Babe Ning" the top Yahoo! Singapore search term.
- 23 August 2010: Duel Mahakarya Magician: Cai and Sum performed alongside with some of Indonesia's top magicians and other international magicians including Peter Marvey, Marc Spelmann and Omar Pasha, with the live TV show reached viewership of over 20 million views.
- 7 January 2012: The Mind Heist, first live-streamed mentalism act reading 100 minds in an hour.
- August 2013: as part of the closing highlights for Singapore Night Festival 2013 outside the National Museum of Singapore, Cai did a solo locked Water Vault escape act as inspired by the Houdini's Milk Can Escape on 30 August 2013. Cai and Sum also did the historic tandem double straitjacket escape while suspended upside down from a burning rope on 31 August 2013.

In October 2014, after 10 years performing around the world, Cai announced that she would be retiring from her work as stage character Magic Babe Ning. She cited her upcoming wedding and her desire to focus on writing as reasons for her retirement. Cai and Sum officially ended their professional collaboration by December 2014.

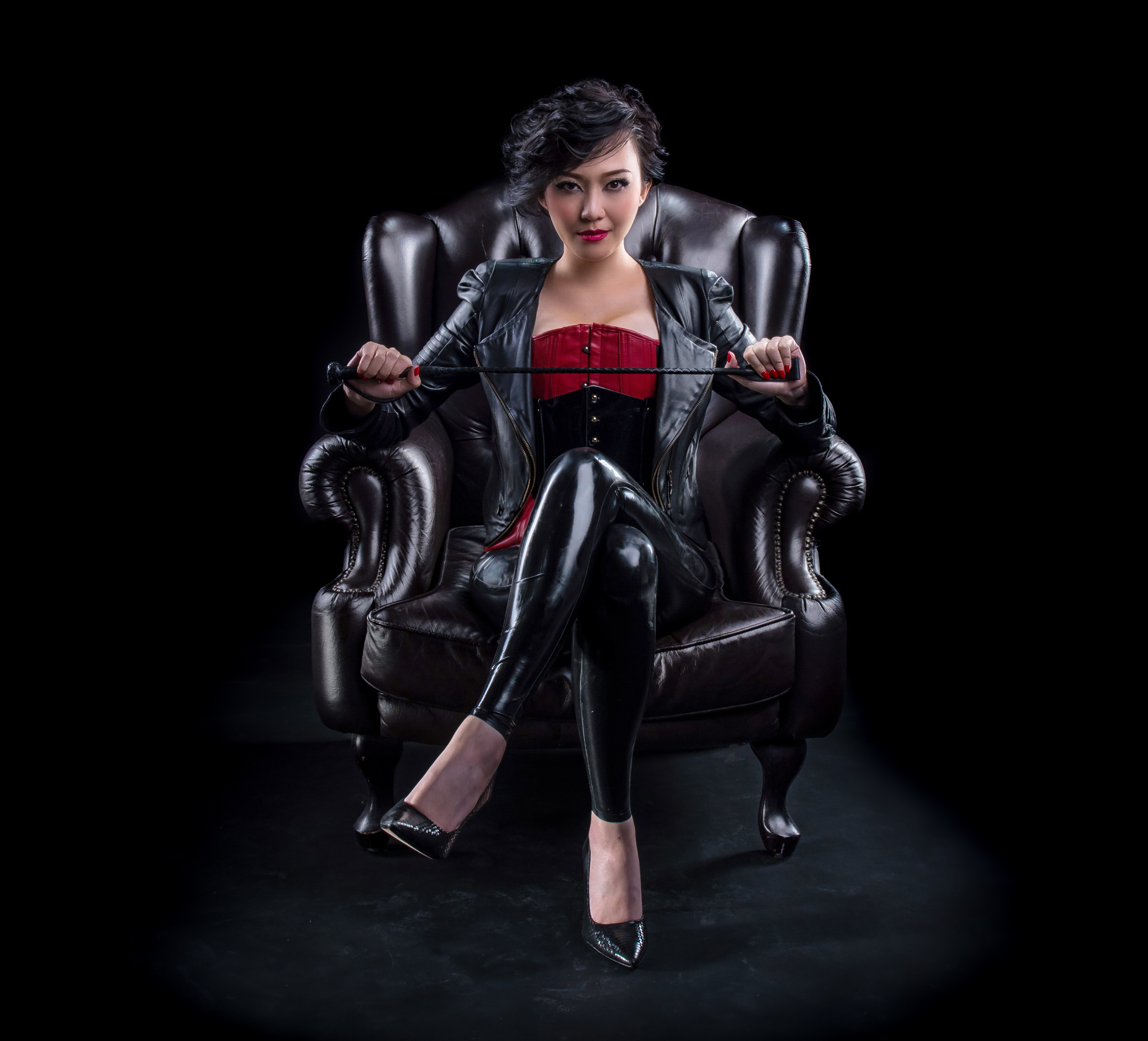
Ning Cai posed as Mind Magic Mistress in 2016

In 2017, Cai made a brief return to magic and entertainment, debut as a mentalist persona of Mind Magic Mistress at some point in March 2017. On the same year, Cai was invited to be a guest for the Mediacorp Channel 5's OK Chope! programme. She also hosted an episode for the Season 2 of local food show, Meat and Greed, which takes celebrities on various culinary journeys around Singapore.

Cai has appeared as one half of Singapore's famous entertainment couple, Ye Qing, in a Channel NewsAsia original production titled Love in a Time of Change, a docu-drama that explores history through the lens of personal romances. Her last role was in the Channel 8 drama series Eat Already? 3 (吃饱没? 3) before stepping back once again to refocus on her writing career.

Ning Cai mingles with staff of OQ Trading at temper. Wine Room & Lounge in Singapore on 8 September 2026

Following her return to Singapore in June 2026, she re-engaged with the local cultural scene, partnering as a content creator for events which included the sharing of a sneak peek and preview of the Singapore Night Festival 2026. On 17 September 2026, Cai announced her out-of-retirement to the magic, mentalism and entertainment industry.

== Writing career ==
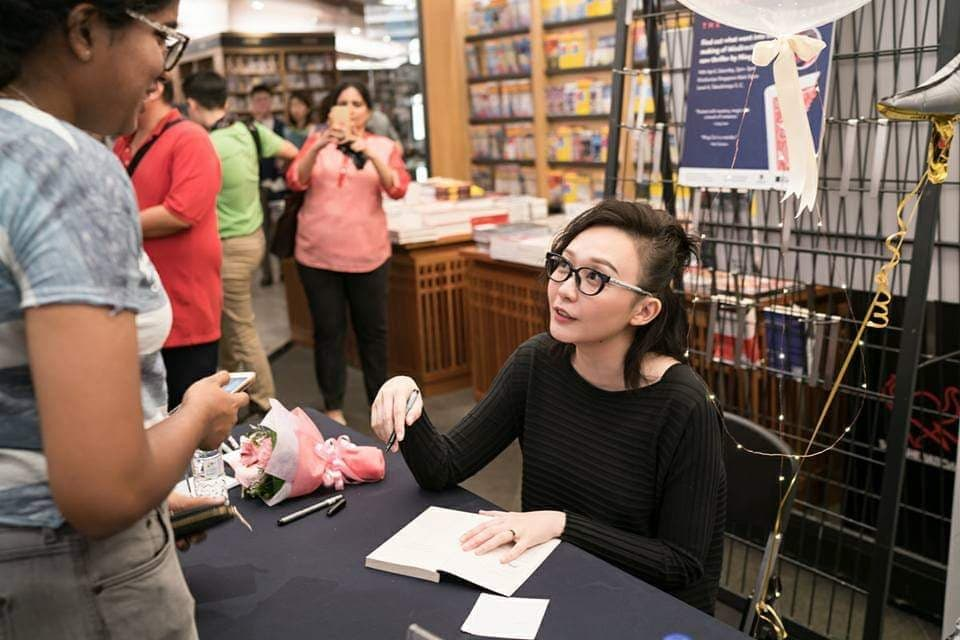
Ning Cai promoting her new book Misdirection at Neo Kinokuniya Singapore on 19 April 2018

Cai collaborated with her longtime friend and mentor, John Teo, president of the International Brotherhood of Magicians (Singapore) in creating an activity book Game of Thoughts: Understanding Creativity Through Mind Games, which comprised a series of 'brain teasers, puzzles conundrums, thought experiments and writing exercises'.

In 2016, she collaborated with Don Bosco in writing Magicienne, a novel featuring a young protagonist who has been described as a "younger version of Magic Babe".

In April 2018, Cai launched the first book of her young adult trilogy. Titled Misdirection, the first volume of the Savant Trilogy, it follows a parkour champion who awakes from a three-year coma and discovers that her family has been murdered by a killer still at large. Cai's original manuscript had been long-listed for the Epigram Books Fiction Prize in 2016 and was subsequently reworked. The book spent six consecutive weeks on The Straits Times bestsellers list. followed by Manipulation in 2021, and Metamorphosis in 2022.

=== Literary influences ===
Cai has cited Neil Gaiman, Terry Moore, and Elizabeth Watasin as influences.

== Other projects ==
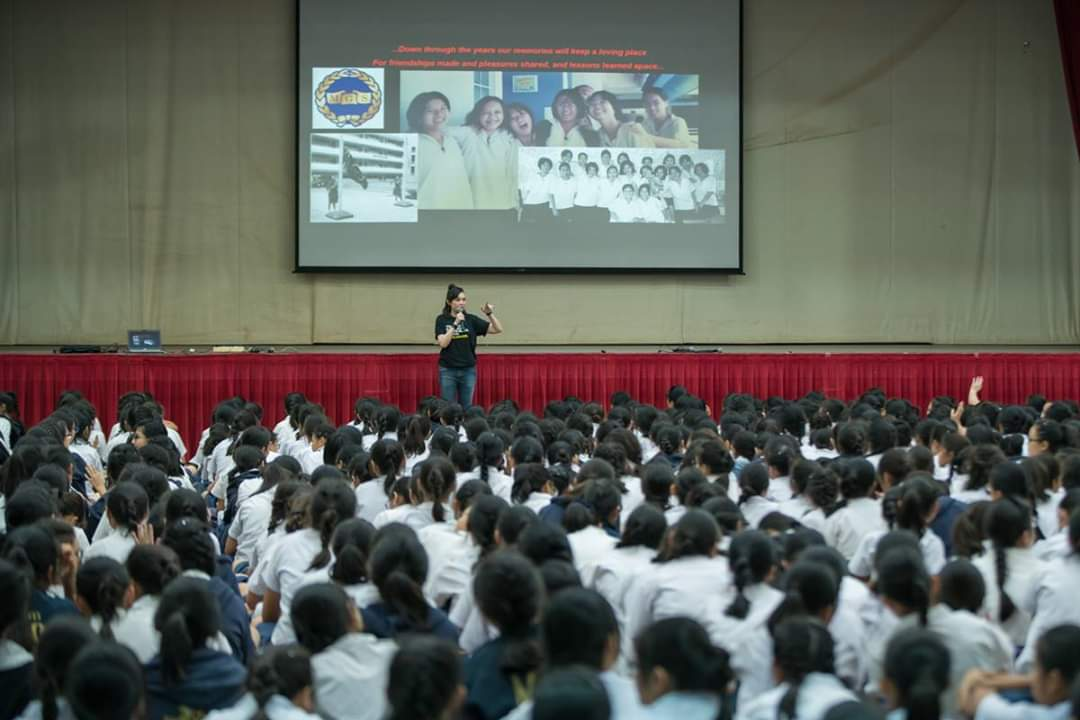
Ning Cai giving a lecture at Methodist Girls' School on 26 Jun 2018.

As part of her professional magic career, Cai ran a Magic Boutique, recognized as Singapore's first online magic shop from 2006 to October 2014. Cai also concurrently served as the creative director of Mighty Magic Lab (formerly Mighty Magic Factory), a kids edutainment company which focuses on empowering the creativity and confidence of children through magic, as well as delivering educational shows. The edutainment company had since been discontinued by 2017.

Cai has also been involved as a panelist promoting gender equality for International Women's Day in Singapore, as well as, talks at local educational institutions like Singapore Institute of Management, St. Joseph's Institution, and her alma mater Methodist Girls' School.

Cai was a featured personality for a Singapore Coke Zero advertorial which appeared in an issue of 8 Days that was released on 3 June 2010 and was also the ambassador for LG Mobile Asia on the same year.

Cai, stemming from a personal experience with cancer, has been involved with many beneficiaries that promote awareness for cancer and was the ambassador for the Power Over Cervical Cancer (POCC) campaign in Singapore from 2010 through 2011.

Cai was a committee member of the Singapore Council of Women’s Organisation’s women’s register from 2015 to 2017.

In 2015, Cai organized a local book hunt called #SG50books50days, an initiative to generate interest in reading books by local authors. Over the course of 50 days, she left 50 books from various authors at 50 different locations, to which she left clues via social media. Books published by local authors such as Neil Humphreys were among those found by those who managed to solve the clues.

== Personal life ==
Cai married her Singaporean partner, who works as museum professional in the arts, in December 2014. After her graduation on November 2019, she resided with her husband permanently in Lausanne, Switzerland. In early 2020 Cai has a son Angelos Skye, named after the island Isle of Skye during her stay at the house of her friend Neil Gaiman in which she completed her novel Manipulation.

Following her eight years living abroad, including six years in Switzerland, she had returned to Singapore on 13 June 2026.

== Bibliography ==
- Adventures of 2 Girls (Marshall Cavendish, 2012) - With Pamela Ho
- Who Is Magic Babe Ning? (Marshall Cavendish, 2015) - Foreword by Neil Gaiman
- Game of Thoughts: Understanding Creativity Through Mind Games (Marshall Cavendish, 2016) - with John Teo
- Magicienne: A Novel (Marshall Cavendish, 2016) - With Don Bosco
- Misdirection: Book One of The Savant Trilogy (Epigram Books, 2018)
- Manipulation: Book Two of the Savant Trilogy (Epigram Books, 2021)
- Metamorphosis: Book Three of the Savant Trilogy (Epigram Books, 2022)

== Achievements and Awards ==
Cai has awarded numerous awards and achieved several records, including:

- Epigram Books Fiction Prize Longlist (2016)
- Singapore Literature Prize shortlist, English Nonfiction for Who is Magic Babe Ning (2016)
- "Outstanding Achievement & Contribution to Magic” Award (2013), International Brotherhood of Magicians, Singapore Ring 115
- "First Tandem Suspended Upside Down Strait Jacket Escape" (2013), Singapore Book of Records
- "Patrons of Magic" Award (2012), International Brotherhood of Magicians, Singapore Ring 115
- "Largest Mind Reading Feat: 100 Minds in 60 Minutes" (2012) Singapore Book of Records
- "Special Recognition Award for Contributions to the Arts & Media Community" (2011) from the School of Film & Media Studies Ngee Ann Polytechnic
- "Merlin Award “Most Original Female Illusionist of the Year" (2009), International Magicians Society
- "Most Number of Grand Illusions Performed in 5 Minutes" (2009), Singapore Book of Records
- "Special Achievement Award" (2009), International Brotherhood of Magicians Singapore Ring 115
- "Straits Times Bestseller List under Children Category for Misdirection: Book 1 of the Savant Trilogy (2018)
- "National Arts Council Arts Scholarship" (2018)

== See also ==
- Ultimate Magic
