= ShiLi & Adi =

- Origin: Singapore
- Years active: 2008–present
- Website: https://www.shiliandadi.com/

ShiLi & Adi is a Singaporean musical duo founded in 2008, consisting of members ShiLi Yap and Adi Rakhmadian. The duo performed for the Formula One Singapore Grand Prix for four consecutive years, from 2012 to 2015. In 2018, the duo were chosen to open at the WAU Live Concert for Wakin Chau and others.

== Members' life and career ==
ShiLi Yap was born on 30 March and is an alumna of Methodist Girls' School (Secondary), Victoria Junior College and National University of Singapore (NUS). In 2013, ShiLi co-founded a talent, events and digital media agency Merry Bees with her partner John Lye.

Adi Rakhmadian was born on 31 August and is originally from Surabaya, Indonesia. An alumnus of Victoria School, Victoria Junior College and National University of Singapore, he met ShiLi Yap while they were studying in Victoria Junior College. Both ShiLi and Adi are members of Victoria Junior College choir who won three gold medals in the Choir Olympics in 2004, Bremen, Germany.

== History ==
=== 2008–2015: Formation and early years ===
From 2012 to 2015, ShiLi & Adi performed at various stages at the Formula One Singapore Grand Prix in English, Chinese, Malay, and Hindi to race fans with jazz and pop classics at the Marina Stage, Esplanade Park Stage and others.

=== 2016: Our Story ===
In 2016, ShiLi & Adi opened the season with their first concert as a duo at the ExxonMobil Campus Concert and a month later featured on First Sparks: 30 Years of Arts on Campus Part of ExxonMobil Campus Concerts alongside other local artists.

=== 2018: Rintangan ===
In 2017, ShiLi & Adi recorded "Rintangan" with arranger Erwin Gutawa as part of Indonesian jazz pianist and composer, Candra Darusman's tribute album Detik Waktu: Perjalanan Karya Cipta Candra Darusman which was released on 2 March 2018 by Demajors and Signature Music Indonesia. The album won Best Album of the Year award at the Indonesian equivalent of the Grammys, the AMI Awards 2018 and featured other Indonesian and Malaysian artistes such as Sheila Majid, Glenn Fredley, Andien, and more.

In February 2018, ShiLi & Adi performed at NParks Concert Series in the Park: Rockestra organised by the National Parks Board. In October 2018, the duo opened for Taiwanese artiste Wakin Chau to 20,000 crowd at the Singapore National Stadium, along with Joanna Dong organised by UnUsual Entertainment and WTA.

=== 2019–present: Berdua ===
In 2019, ShiLi & Adi held a concert showcase "Berdua" on 13 February 2019 in Singapore to a sold out theatre to celebrate the upcoming releases of ShiLi & Adi's singles for "When I'm With You (WIWY)" / "Bersamamu]", "Pick Me" and "Kebetulan" / "原来 是你" which will be out in phases from March 2019 onwards on Spotify, Apple Music, JOOX and Deezer via Warner Indonesia.

== Members ==
Members	Instrument(s)	Years active
ShiLi Yap	Vocals	2008–present
Adi Rakhmadian	Vocals, Keyboard	2008–present

== Discography ==
=== Singles ===
- "When I'm with You" (2019)
- "Bersamamu" (2019)

=== Collaboration ===
- "Rintangan" – a collaboration with Indonesian arranger Erwin Gutawa, by original composer Candra Darusman (2017)
