= Douglas Foo =

Singaporean business executive and former politician

Dato' Seri Douglas Foo PBM BBM
- 符标雄

Chairman, Sakae Holdings Ltd
- Incumbent
- Assumed office 1996

Singapore’s Non Resident High Commissioner to Tanzania
- Incumbent
- Assumed office 5 March 2019
- President: Halimah Yacob

Nominated Member of Parliament
- In office 26 September 2018 – 23 June 2020

Personal details
- Born: 1969 (age 56–57) Singapore
- Spouse: Koh Yen Khoon
- Children: 4
- Parent: Foo Kia Hee (father)
- Relatives: Sister – Lilian Foo; Sister – Lena Foo
- Education: Red Swastika School; Dunman High School; Victoria Junior College
- Alma mater: Royal Melbourne Institute of Technology

Dato' Seri Douglas Foo Peow Yong PBM BBM (Chinese: 符标雄; born 1969) is a Singaporean business executive and former Nominated Member of Parliament (NMP). He is the founder and chairman of Sakae Holdings Ltd; as well as Singapore's Non Resident High Commissioner to Tanzania and appointed representative to the ASEAN Business Advisory Council. He is also the President of the Singapore Manufacturing Federation (SMF), vice-president of the Singapore National Employers’ Federation (SNEF) and vice-chairman of the Singapore Business Federation (SBF).

== Early life and education ==
Foo was born in Singapore in 1969 and has two younger sisters Lena and Lilian. His father, Foo Kia Hee, was an immigrant from Hainan, China and worked as a mechanical and electrical consultant.

Foo received his primary education at Red Swastika School, secondary education at Dunman High School and pre-university education at Victoria Junior College.

Foo had originally planned to study Engineering at the Nanyang Technological University (NTU), but decided to switch course to Business administration. However, he did not qualify for NTU's business school, and thus travelled to Australia to study at the Royal Melbourne Institute of Technology. He graduated in 1994 with a Bachelor's degree in business administration (finance).

Foo attended the Eisenhower Fellowships in 2013.

== Career ==
=== Business career ===
Before his National service enlistment, he worked various jobs including taking turbine readings for engineers at the Seraya Power Plant, relief teaching at Pin Yi Secondary School and as a baker at Délifrance.

After finishing his university education in Australia, Foo returned to Singapore and joined Tokyu Group, where he worked as a marketing executive in the real estate arm of the company. While working there, one of his Japanese clients interested him in forming a garment manufacturing and trading business which would manufacture garments in India and sell them in Japan. Despite being inexperienced in the field, Foo invested S$100,000 in the idea and formed Apex-Pal International Pte Ltd in 1996. The company's office was based in International Plaza and had a factory in India with 50 workers and reconditioned sewing machine from Taiwan. The business was profitable within its first year.

During SMF's Annual General Meeting on 19 September 2014, it was announced that Foo would be the President of SMF from 19 October 2014, succeeding George Huang.

Foo joined the SBF Council in 2014 as a member after having previously served on the SBF-led SME Committee. He was appointed as vice-chairman of SBF in June 2018.

==== Sakae Sushi ====
Following the success of his company's venture, Foo was interested in expanding and diversifying the company. He recognised that Singaporeans were increasingly health conscious about their food. He saw a business opportunity in providing Japanese food at prices more affordable to the masses as Japanese food, although healthy, was rather expensive at the time. He travelled to Japan and Hong Kong to explore the concept of conveyor belt sushi, before opening the first outlet of Sakae Sushi at OUB Centre at Raffles Place in September 1997 during the 1997 Asian financial crisis. The business was successful, and it allowed the company to open numerous Sakae Sushi outlets around the world. The company has since also developed various other Food and Beverage brands.

After becoming publicly listed on the Singapore Exchange on 16 July 2003, the company was renamed to Apex-Pal International Ltd, and was subsequently renamed to Sakae Holdings Ltd on 4 May 2010.

Foo served as the chairman and chief executive officer (CEO) of the company until 1 March 2014 when his sister Lilian Foo took over as the CEO.

===== Dishwasher's salary incident =====
In 2012, during an interview with radio station UFM100.3, Foo claimed that he was unable to fill 10 dishwasher positions at a salary of SGD$3,000 monthly. Foo initially claimed the dishwashers would work nine hours a day, six days a week and the salary is equivalent to their managers and supervisors. The salary was about three times the median pay of a dishwasher at that time accordingly to the Ministry of Manpower. About 300 enquiries and applications for the dishwasher position were made within a day of the interview but Brand and communications manager Gregg Lewis clarified that the position required working for 12 hours a day for six days a week. Foo also later clarified that the $3,000 pay is achieved with overtime pay and had hired dishwashers with salaries between $2,300 to $2,900.

The incident attracted Minister of Law and Foreign Affairs K. Shanmugam and National Trades Union Congress deputy secretary-general Ong Ye Kung to express their surprise that Sakae Sushi cannot hire dishwashers at $3,000. Member of parliament Zainudin Nordin, who chairs the Government Parliamentary Committee for Manpower, praised Sakae Sushi for paying dishwashers with a salary comparable to its managers and supervisor.

In 2018, before being sworn in as a NMP, Foo in an interview with The Online Citizen, said that the incident was taken out of context. He said that instead of Sakae Sushi paying an agency $3,000 a month for a dishwasher, he would rather the company to pay the $3,000 directly to the dishwasher.

=== Political career ===
Foo was selected as an NMP on 17 September 2018. He was sworn in during the following Parliament sitting on 1 October. He served during the second session of 13th Parliament of Singapore, which commenced on 7 May 2018. His term of NMP ended on 23 June 2020 when the Parliament was dissolved prior to the 2020 Singaporean general election.

== Personal life ==
Foo is married to Koh Yen Khoon, who he met in 1988 while working at a Délifrance cafe. He has 4 sons.

== Honours ==
- Singapore:
  - Pingat Bakti Masyarakat PBM (Public Service Medal) (2007)
  - Bintang Bakti Masyarakat BBM (Public Service Star) (2013)
- Indonesia:
  - Seri Pangeran Temenggong Sultan Mahmud Badaruddin III Dato' Seri (conferred by the Sultan of Palembang Darussalam Sultan Mahmud Badaruddin III, Prabu Diraja in 2016)
