= Kwek Kok Kwong =

Singaporean CEO (1967–2020)

- 郭國光
- Born: 1967
- Died: November 14, 2020 (aged 52–53)
- Education: Bachelor of Arts (Mathematics), Master of Arts (Statistics and Quantum Physics), Master of Public Policy
- Alma mater: University of Cambridge, Harvard University

Kwek Kok Kwong (Chinese: 郭國光, 1967–2020) was the chief executive officer of NTUC LearningHub. As the CEO of the Singapore-based training and education provider, he had been involved in the up-skilling of workers in light of the digital age. He was also the chair of the Singapore National Co-operative Federation (SNCF) since 2016 and a member of the International Cooperative Alliance (ICA) Global Board since 2017. Before entering the social enterprise industry, Kwek served in the Singaporean Army for over 20 years.

== Education ==
Kwek studied at Victoria School (1980–1983) and Victoria Junior College (1984–1985). As a SAF overseas scholar, he studied at the University of Cambridge, where he graduated with a degree in mathematics. Kwek also held two graduate degrees. In 1993, he obtained a Master of Arts with a major in Statistics and Quantum Physics. received a Master of Public Administration from the Kennedy School of Government of Harvard University in 2002 with the Lucius N. Littauer Fellow distinction.

== Career ==
After graduating from Cambridge University in 1989, Kwek joined the Singapore Armed Forces (SAF), where he served for over two decades. In 2009, he attained the rank of brigadier-general in the Republic of Singapore Air Force (RSAF). He left the SAF in 2012.

In February 2013, Kwek was appointed CEO of NTUC LearningHub, an educational and training provider based in Singapore. As the CEO, Kwek helmed the vision of the social enterprise to up-skill workers through training programs and industry-relevant courses.

Kwek was involved in securing a partnership with the social enterprise, Caregiver Asia to upgrade the skill set of freelance home caregivers in Singapore through Workforce Skills Qualification (WSQ) courses.

In November 2017, Kwek was nominated by the Singapore National Cooperative Federation to the International Cooperative Alliance Global Board and was subsequently elected. He was tasked to foster greater collaboration between international cooperatives.

In 2018, Kwek spearheaded NTUC LearningHub's Healthcare Academy initiative to train healthcare workers affected by the digitalization of medical records and patient services. That same year, NTUC LearningHub secured a partnership with the American publisher John Wiley & Sons (Wiley) to update its curriculum. In partnership with SkillsFutureSG, Shopee, LinkedIn, and Avast, NTUC LearningHub launched new classes on e-commerce, employability, and cybersecurity in 2019; as a part of its SkillsFuture for Digital Workplace (SFDW) course.

== Personal life ==
Kwek was an avid athlete, having participated in marathons and taken up cycling as a hobby. He was married and had two children; a son and a daughter.

Kwek died on 14 November 2020 at the age of 53. According to news reports, he had collapsed after a cycling session.
