= Cedar Girls' Secondary School =

Cedar Girls' Secondary School 四德女子中学 Sekolah Menengah Perempuan Cedar சீடார்ப் பெண்கள் உயர்நிலை பள்ளி

Location
- 1 Cedar Avenue, Singapore 349692; Potong Pasir; Singapore; 1.3343°N 103.8742°E

Information
- Type: Government, Autonomous
- Motto: Honesty, Perseverance, Courtesy
- Established: 1957
- Sister school: Victoria School
- Session: Single session
- School code: 3004
- Principal: Thong May Theng
- Gender: Girls
- Enrolment: approx. 1,400
- Colour: Blue Grey Gold
- Affiliations: Victoria Junior College (IP), Victoria School
- Website: cedargirlssec.moe.edu.sg

Cedar Girls’ Secondary School is a government autonomous girls’ secondary school in Singapore. Established in 1957, it initially offered only a four-year Express course leading to the Singapore-Cambridge GCE Ordinary Level examinations. Starting in 2012, it has partnered with Victoria Junior College to offer a six-year Integrated Programme, which allows students to proceed to Victoria for Year 5 and Year 6 to take the Singapore-Cambridge GCE Advanced Level examinations at the end of 6 Years.

== History ==
Cedar Girls' Secondary School was founded as school with a pioneer batch of 507 students in 1957. The pioneer batch consisted of girls from the Bartley, Beatty and Siglap schools as a result of the government making all schools single-sex that year.

In the 1960s, the school became well known for its performance in track and field, as well as for producing several national athletes. In 1972, athletic facilities were constructed in the school compound at a cost of S$250,000. By doing so, it became the first school in Singapore to have sports amenities on campus. In 1981, the school became one of the first 16 schools in Singapore to have computer appreciation as an extra-curricular activity. From 1989 to 1994, the school was torn down and rebuilt as part of the modernisation of the curriculum. The school went single session in 1992 and gained autonomous status in 1996. In 2004, the school was classified as a band one school for its consistent academic performance.

=== PRIME ===
On 14 February 2007, the Ministry of Education announced that under the programme PRIME Phase 9, eight more schools will be upgraded from 2008 to 2010, which included Cedar Girls' Secondary School.

Cedar Girls' Secondary School moved to a holding site at 3 Geylang Bahru Lane from December 2007 to December 2009 during the upgrading. The holding site was formerly the site of Victoria School from 1984 to May 2003. Cedar Girls' Secondary School moved back to its present site and started the new academic year in 2010 at the new building.

== Academic information ==
The school offers a four-year Express course leading up to the Singapore-Cambridge GCE Ordinary Level examinations, as well as a six-year Integrated Programme under the Victoria-Cedar Alliance (VCA).

=== Victoria-Cedar Alliance Integrated Programme (VCA IP) ===
The Victoria-Cedar Alliance Integrated Programme is a six-year Integrated Programme which allows students to skip the Singapore-Cambridge GCE Ordinary Level examinations that Express stream students take at the end of Secondary Four. Cedar Girls' Secondary School started offering the Integrated Programme with Victoria School and Victoria Junior College from 2012, building upon the success of the four-year Victoria Integrated Programme (VIP) started by Victoria Junior College in 2005. Under the Integrated Programme, Cedar students complete their four-year secondary education in Cedar Girls' Secondary School before joining Victoria Junior College in Years 5 and 6 and take the Singapore-Cambridge GCE Advanced Level examinations at the end of Year 6.

== Character and leadership education ==
The school has several ways in which pupils can exercise leadership: the prefectorial board; the sports and health leaders board; the peer support board; and the monitress council.

== Co-curricular activities ==
The school offers 21 co-curricular activities (CCAs), including physical sports, performing arts, clubs and societies and uniformed groups.

The school competes in track and field, and has attained 40 "B" and "C" Division titles in the National Inter-School Track And Field Championships since 1968. The school's table tennis team has also seen success, ranked in the top 10 for both the East Zone and National Inter-school Table Tennis Championships' "B" and "C" Divisions.

The school's uniformed group, the National Police Cadet Corps unit has attained Gold in the Unit Overall Proficiency Award for 13 years consecutively from 2000 to 2013. The school's two Girl Guide companies have also attained Gold for the Puan Noor Aishah Award since 2011.

The CCAs offered in the school are as follows:

Physical sports

- Badminton
- Basketball
- Cross Country
- Netball
- Table Tennis
- Track and Field
- Volleyball

Uniformed groups

- Girl Guides
- National Cadet Corps (Land)
- National Police Cadet Corps
- Red Cross

Visual and performing arts

- Choir
- Guzheng Ensemble
- Handbell Ensemble
- Modern Dance
- Symphonic Band

Clubs and societies

- English Language Literacy, Drama and Debate Society
- Environment Club
- Infocomm Club
- AV and Photography

== Notable alumni ==
- Annette Lee, actress, scriptwriter and singer-songwriter
- Anthea Ong, former Nominated Member of Parliament
- Jacelyn Tay, former actress
- Xiaohan, Mandopop lyricist
- Rachel Yang, Singapore's record holder for pole vaulting
