= Dîner en Blanc =

International public dining event

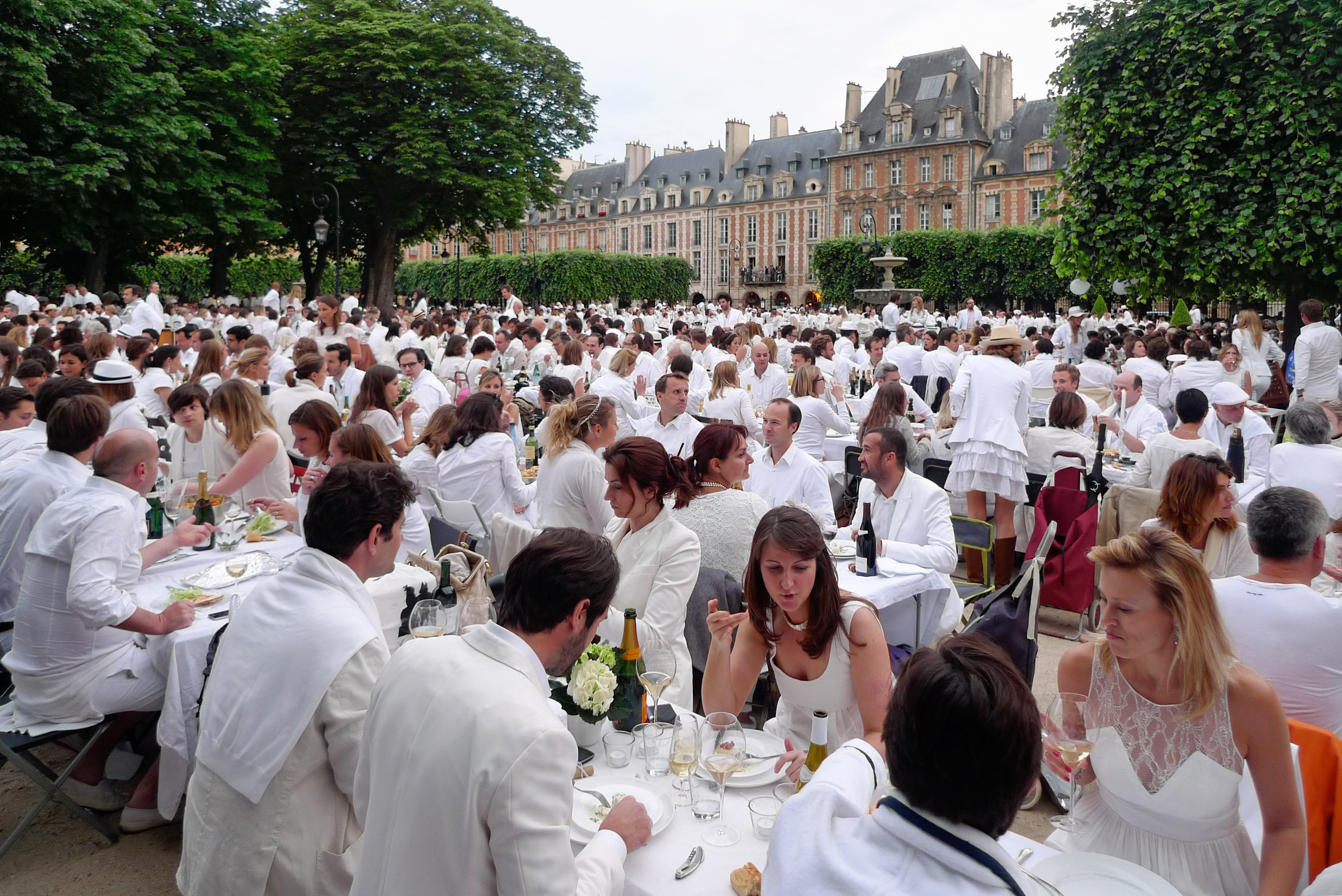
- Dîner en Blanc; Paris, Place des Vosges (2012)
- Founded: 1988
- Founder: François Pasquier
- Headquarters: Paris, France
- Number of locations: 90+ cities
- Website: www.dinerenblanc.com

Dîner en Blanc ("Dinner in White" in French) is a worldwide event spanning six continents in which people dressed in white have a meal in a temporary dining setup in a public space. Diners are required to provide their own food, tables, chairs and tablecloths. The location of the event is kept secret from the majority of participants until minutes before the event, at which point all attendees generally converge in an iconic urban location.

== History ==
The Dîner en Blanc concept began in Paris in 1988 when François Pasquier invited a group of friends to an elegant outdoor dinner at the Bois de Boulogne, asking them to dress in white so they could find each other. The event's presence has grown to over 85 cities, with almost 17,000 gathering for the 30th-anniversary event in Paris.

Pasquier's son, Aymeric, introduced the concept to Montreal, Canada in 2009. In 2011, with the help of Sandy Safi, Aymeric Pasquier hosted the first American Dîner en Blanc in New York City. The event has grown to have an attendance of more than 6,500 with a waiting list of over 80,000 people. In 2012, Aymeric Pasquier and Sandy Safi partnered to create Dîner en Blanc International Inc., a Canadian company in charge of developing the Diner en Blanc network and license worldwide.

In 2012, Singapore was the first Asian city to host a Dîner en Blanc, and Brisbane the first Australian city. Canberra held Dîners en Blanc in 2013 and 2014, and Melbourne debuted the phenomenon in 2015.

In 2020, due to the COVID-19 pandemic, Taiwan, Australia and New Zealand were the only three countries to host the event.
