= Streetdirectory.com =

Online web mapping service

- Website type: Web Map Service
- Owners: JobsDB (2008 – ) Virtual Map (S) Pte Ltd (2000–2008)
- Creator: Robert J. Steiner (S) Pte Ltd
- Website: http://www.streetdirectory.com/
- Commercial: Yes
- Registration: Optional

Streetdirectory.com is an online web mapping service, founded by Singapore-headquartered Virtual Map in 2000. It originally used licensed data from Singapore Land Authority (SLA) under a non-exclusive agreement until July 2004. On top of providing free maps for personal use, the website also offers a variety of ad-supported services. The website has since expanded to include maps in Malaysia and Indonesia.

Streetdirectory.com won several lawsuits against other businesses who used Streetdirectory.com's maps without permission resulting in copyright infringement. It then lost a copyright infringement lawsuit by SLA in early 2008 for selling its maps, produced from SLA's maps, after the end of agreement with SLA.

== History ==
On 1 August 2008, four months after the lawsuit by SLA, Streetdirectory.com and the remaining assets of Virtual Map was acquired by JobsDB for an undisclosed sum. At the same time, maps newly generated from scratch after nine months' of groundwork went online. A new company, Streetdirectory, was created in place to manage the running of the Singapore, Indonesia and Malaysia websites.

== Services ==
The website is best known for offering an online version of the Singapore street directory, which is free for personal use. It is also accompanied with value-added tools such as driving directions, photos of locations, and a travel guide. Some of these services have been previously offered only on a pay-per-use basis, but an advertisement-supported alternative has since been made available.

== Legal issues ==
=== Copyright infringement by other companies ===
Since early 2004, Streetdirectory.com has gained prominence in several of its owner's successful legal action against schools and small and medium enterprises for what they see as unauthorised use of its maps. This is after Virtual Map has also won landmark cases against larger enterprises such as NTUC Income and Suncool International, with the former's damages waived and the latter's appeal being subsequently dismissed.

Its owner is known to have hired an IT firm to conduct investigations aggressively against the unlicensed use of their maps on other websites, and most of the defendants contacted by Virtual Map's legal team claim that they were not aware that doing so constitutes a copyright infringement. Nevertheless, they were liable for damages and lawyers subsequently warned of this fact in the local media.

The justification given by Virtual Map was that enough skill and effort was made in using SLA data to create maps that the company can claim its own independent copyright to, and suffered from a loss of potential profit when businesses reproduced their maps online without paying any licensing fees. Such use constituted, as Virtual Map claims, infringement of the Copyright Law and has angered existing clients who have legally paid to license their maps. This position was endorsed by the High Court of Singapore, which gave Virtual Map the green light to send cease and desist letters to hundreds of companies and organisations who have used the maps on their websites in a similar manner, demanding that they either pay up to $10,000 or more, or to face legal action. In most cases matters were settled out of court.

=== Copyright infringement ===
In October 2006, Virtual Map became embroiled in a civil suit against the ex-provider, Singapore Land Authority (SLA), a statutory board under the Singapore Ministry of Law. Until July 2004, Singapore Land Authority (SLA) provided digitised data to Virtual Map non-exclusively under seven agreements that the latter has signed, and claims that the latter has infringed SLA's copyright by continually selling and redistributing its maps even after the expiration of the agreements.

The statutory board is currently seeking damages, an injunction to prevent further use of the data by Virtual Map, an order to disclose its client's list and addresses, and to destroy all copies of the infringing material. In its defence, Virtual Map has reiterated that its works have been sufficiently original, an argument which held in Suncool's unsuccessful appeal against the company. The defendant has also claimed that SLA has obtained information from other agencies that it did not own. On the second day of the trial, three SLA employees took the stand to testify that Virtual Map has copied "SLA's skeleton", which has been the "hard work, skill, labour and money invested by the government", and pointed out several irregularities in Virtual Map's work.

The trial began on 8 January 2007. SLA has since set up an alternative website that allows non-commercial users to download its maps for free. Eight months later on 7 August 2007, a district court ruled that Virtual Map's online maps on streetdirectory.com had breached SLA's copyright. District Judge Thian Yee Sze also held that Virtual Map should stop "dealing in maps which are reproductions of SLA's street directory vector data and address point vector data", and further ordered an inquiry into the damages due to SLA. Lawyers from Drew & Napier represented SLA, while Virtual Map was defended by counsel from Rodyk & Davidson.

Streetdirectory.com lost its subsequent appeal on the decision, but it did not affect the earlier legal settlements against hundreds of businesses and organisations. However, it had to shut down its map service pending replacement of its map data.
