= J C Sum =

Singaporean businessman, author and illusion designer (born 1976)

- Sum in 2010
- Born: Sum Jan-chung; 5 December 1976 (age 49); Singapore
- Education: Victoria Junior College; National University of Singapore
- Occupations: Management consultant; marketer; former illusionist; former illusion designer
- Years active: 1993–present
- Employer(s): Concept Magic (founder); Evolve & Adapt (founder)
- Website: jcsum.com

Sum Jan-chung (born 5 December 1976) is a Singaporean businessman, author, content creator, former illusionist and illusion designer.

During his time as a professional illusionist, Sum was nicknamed "The Thinking Man's Magician", Sum was one of the most highly regarded illusionists and illusion designers from Asia. AsiaOne named him as "one of the most celebrated illusionists in Asia" and MagicSeen called him "The Ace in Asia". The Straits Times stated that he is "Singapore's most famous magician" and The Business Times of Singapore, credited him for bringing "magic to the mainstream market in Asia".

Sum has been credited for popularising magic in Singapore by the local media and magic organizations. Before his retirement from the stage, Sum performed around the world as a stage magician and illusionist for corporate and special events, showrooms and luxury cruise liners. He currently works as a strategy consultant with Evolve & Adapt, a marketing firm based outside Singapore.

== Magic career ==
=== Early career ===
Sum was born in Singapore on 5 December 1976. He studied at Victoria School and Victoria Junior College.

Sum first found his interest in magic at a very young age of 12 years and began performing professionally at the age of 16. In 1993, Sum joined the International Brotherhood of Magicians, Singapore Ring 115 and took part in the 1994 Close-up Competition where he took 2nd place with an original cups and balls routine. He subsequently won the Most Entertaining Magician title at the 1996 IBM Ring 115 Close-up Magic Competition.

Sum performed his first show in 1993 for a children's party. In 1998, his "One-Man-Parade" was published in the March issue of The Linking Ring, the official publication of the International Brotherhood of Magicians. This collection of original magic effects earned him two coveted Linking Ring Awards the next year.

Throughout his junior college days and time in national service in the army, Sum performed shows and was also booked to perform close-up magic weekly at hotels at restaurants such as Shangri-la, Hilton, Four Seasons, Tony Romas and Lion City Hotel. After national service, he was admitted to the National University of Singapore where he majored in English language and sociology, with a minor in philosophy. He gave up a 4th year honors degree to pursue magic full time.

His early influences in magic include David Copperfield, Dai Vernon, John Carney, David Williamson, Darwin Ortiz, Paul Harris, Wayne Dobson, Jim Steinmeyer, Lance Burton, the Pendragons, Franz Harary, Frank Garcia, Michael Ammar, Richard Ang, Tang Sai Thong, Michael Lim and Pastor Lawrence Khong.

By the new millennium, Sum was performing illusion shows for corporate and special events across Asia.

== Career ==
=== Television and broadcast media projects ===
Sum's first television break came in the 2004 President's Star Charity where he performed a series of illusions including his Crystal Striptease illusion with former radio personality Jamie Yeo, a personalized card routine of S.R. Nathan, the 6th President of Singapore, and finally making a car appear along with Singapore sports Olympians. Together with a host of local celebrities, the show raised S$2.83 mil for various beneficiaries.

In 2006, Sum starred in Singapore's first street magic television series, as part of Jack Neo's popular Top Fun variety show for Channel 8, MediaCorp Studios. The series was created specifically for J C by MediaCorp Studios. The segments were subsequently compiled and released as a VCD/ DVD titled Street Illusions, distributed by TS Group in Singapore and Malaysia. The same year, he also appeared in 3 episodes of a variety television show performing street magic for the Shanghai Oriental Television Station, China.

In 2007, Sum starred in Magic in Motion, a 24-part street magic series produced for Singapore Press Holdings' MediaBoxOffice (SPHMBO).

From 2009 to 2012, Sum, together with Magic Babe Ning appeared on several television shows around the world including: Channel 8's "Five Stars Carnival", "Asia Uncut", AXN EBuzz, Sony Style TV Magazine, The Amazing Race Asia 4, "Duel Mahakarya Magician" on RCTI, Indonesia TV, Le Plus Grand Cabaret du Monde in Paris, France (2011 & 2012), Itte-Q! and Italian TV, La Grande Magia.

=== Live performances, mega illusion and stunts ===
From 2007 to 2013, Sum performed with Magic Babe Ning many notable projects. On 18 August 2007, Sum successfully presented the largest single live illusion ever staged in South East Asia, "The Impossible Teleportation" Mega Illusion. He teleported himself in 5 seconds, from street level while surrounded by more than 9000 spectators and reappeared on the roof of a skyscraper, 50 floors above, within a ring of witnesses. The Mega Illusion was staged at Raffles Place, the heart of the business district in Singapore.

J C Sum at "Magic Day @ the Arena" in February 2009

February 2009

Since then, Sum has designed and staged a wide variety of mega illusions and stunts including teleporting 3 people across the iconic Singapore River in 2.5 seconds., performing 15 grand illusions in 5 minutes., teleporting a Volkswagen Golf 1.4 TSI from the Volkswagen showroom to the stage in 8.5 seconds, predicting the Singapore 4D lottery, making five audience vanish while they were elevated 24 ft (7 m) high up in the air, reading the minds of 100 random people in under 60 minutes and performing a tandem straitjacket escape suspended upside 75 ft in the air from a burning rope.

Sum's next mega illusions include the teleportation of a large inanimate object, reading the minds of 1000 people, vanishing a train and an illusion that will showcase Singapore's racial harmony. He was in talks with Sentosa years ago to make the Merlion tower vanish but the project got canceled due to the SARS outbreak.

Sum and Ning established Ultimate Magic, Singapore's first permanent illusion show from 2008 to 2009.

J C Sum in m Idea Youth Choice Awards 2011

Sum's new technology digital magic act, the "iFrame" was officially launched in Kuala Lumpur, Malaysia on 23 March 2016 to corporate clients, event planners and media. The original creation took three years to conceptualize and design, and one additional year to build and rehearse.

In 2016, Sum performed on Asia's newest and largest cruise liner, Royal Caribbean Cruise Liners', "Ovation of the Seas" as the resident headline entertainer from June to November 2016.

=== Retirement from the entertainment industry ===
On 2 May 2020, Sum announced his retirement from the entertainment industry on his Facebook page. He revealed that he had spent the past year working with consulting clients and got certified as a management consultant and marketer.

== Achievements and awards ==
Sum has achieved several records and awarded numerous awards including:

- "Outstanding Achievement & Contribution to Magic" Award (2013), International Brotherhood of Magicians, Singapore Ring 115
- "First Tandem Suspended Upside Down Strait Jacket Escape" (2013), Singapore Book of Records
- "Patrons of Magic" Award (2012), International Brotherhood of Magicians, Singapore Ring 115
- "Largest Mind Reading Feat: 100 Minds in 60 Minutes" (2012) Singapore Book of Records
- "Special Recognition Award for Contributions to the Arts & Media Community" (2011) from the School of Film & Media Studies, Ngee Ann Polytechnic
- Merlin Award "Most Original Illusionist of the Year" (2009), International Magicians Society
- "Most Number of Grand Illusions Performed in 5 Minutes" (2009), Singapore Book of Records
- "Master of Magic" (2005) International Festival of Magic, Bangladesh
- Two Linking Ring Awards (1999) International Brotherhood of Magicians (U.S.A)

== Illusion design and products ==
Sum designs many of his own illusions for his shows. He has written numerous books on illusion design and presentation.

Besides books, Sum has also released DVDs and video products on magic and illusions.

His published works include:

- One Man Parade, The Linking Ring (March 1999)
- The Magic Notebook (1998) – Lecture Notes
- One Man Parade, The Linking Ring (November 2002)
- Illusionary Departures (July 2004, 2012)
- The Event Illusionist (December 2004)
- Equilateral (August 2006)
- Beyond the Stage (January 2007) – Lecture Notes
- Urban Illusions (2009)
- Pack Flat Illusions for Kid's & Family Shows (2011)
- The Event Magician Volume 1 (2011)
- The Event Magician Volume 2 (2011)
- Urban Underground (2011) - DVD
- Behind the Illusions (2011) - DVD
- Illusionism (2012)
- Ultimate Illusion Collection – Compilation of 4 books (2012)
- 3 Sides of Magic (2012) – Lecture Notes
- Corporate Illusions Made Easy (2013)
- The Complete Illusion Library – Compilation of 8 Books (2014)
- How to Be an Illusionist (2014)
- Project One: The Solo Illusionist (2015)

== Consultancy career and business ==
Sum is a certified management consultant (TR 43:2015), an American Marketing Association Professional Certified Marketer (PCM) in marketing management and SSG-WSQ Certified Digital Strategist.

As a strategy consultant, he leads a team of marketers at Evolve & Adapt, to help with businesses on strategic marketing consulting, digital marketing training and SEO services. He also authored the book “Evolve, Adapt or Collapse: Bottom Line Marketing in a Digitally Evolving World" that was featured on Money Mind on CNA938.

In Singapore, Sum is recognized as a creative entrepreneur & marketer for making magic a successful career and business. He is the founder and creative magic producer for "Concept:Magic", which produces his shows, special projects and manages magic talents.

Sum was a Spirit of Enterprise Nominee 2007 which recognizes individuals/ business with exceptional entrepreneurial spirit. He is highly influenced by Jack Trout's & Al Ries' 'Positioning' marketing strategy which he adopts extensively in his businesses.

Sum runs a number of websites including IllusionBooks.com which is the world's largest free online resource for illusionists. Sum also spearheaded the development of largest single resource on Kabuki Drops, a theatrical curtain drop reveal system MagicKabukiDrop.com. He is also the creator of the Pro Magic Kabuki Drop system that is an original portable, manual Kabuki curtain drop system.

Sum is also the founder of Backstage Business Academy that educates entertainers on business, marketing and investing. He published "The Showbiz Master Plan: A Blueprint to Building a Successful Live Entertainment Career" that is available on Amazon and from J C directly.

Sum has given talks at numerous business events including for Passion Unleashed, for the Young Indians association in Kolkata, India as well as TEDxNTU and TEDxCQ events where he shared his thoughts on creativity, business and marketing.

== Related videos ==
- J C Sum Intro Showreel 2016 – YouTube
- J C Sum The Impossible Teleportation - Youtube
- J C Sum iFrame Show Promo - Youtube
