= Délifrance =

International company specialising in French bakery products

- Industry: Food supplier
- Founded: 1983; 43 years ago
- Products: Bread; viennoiserie; cake; savouries
- Website: delifrance.com

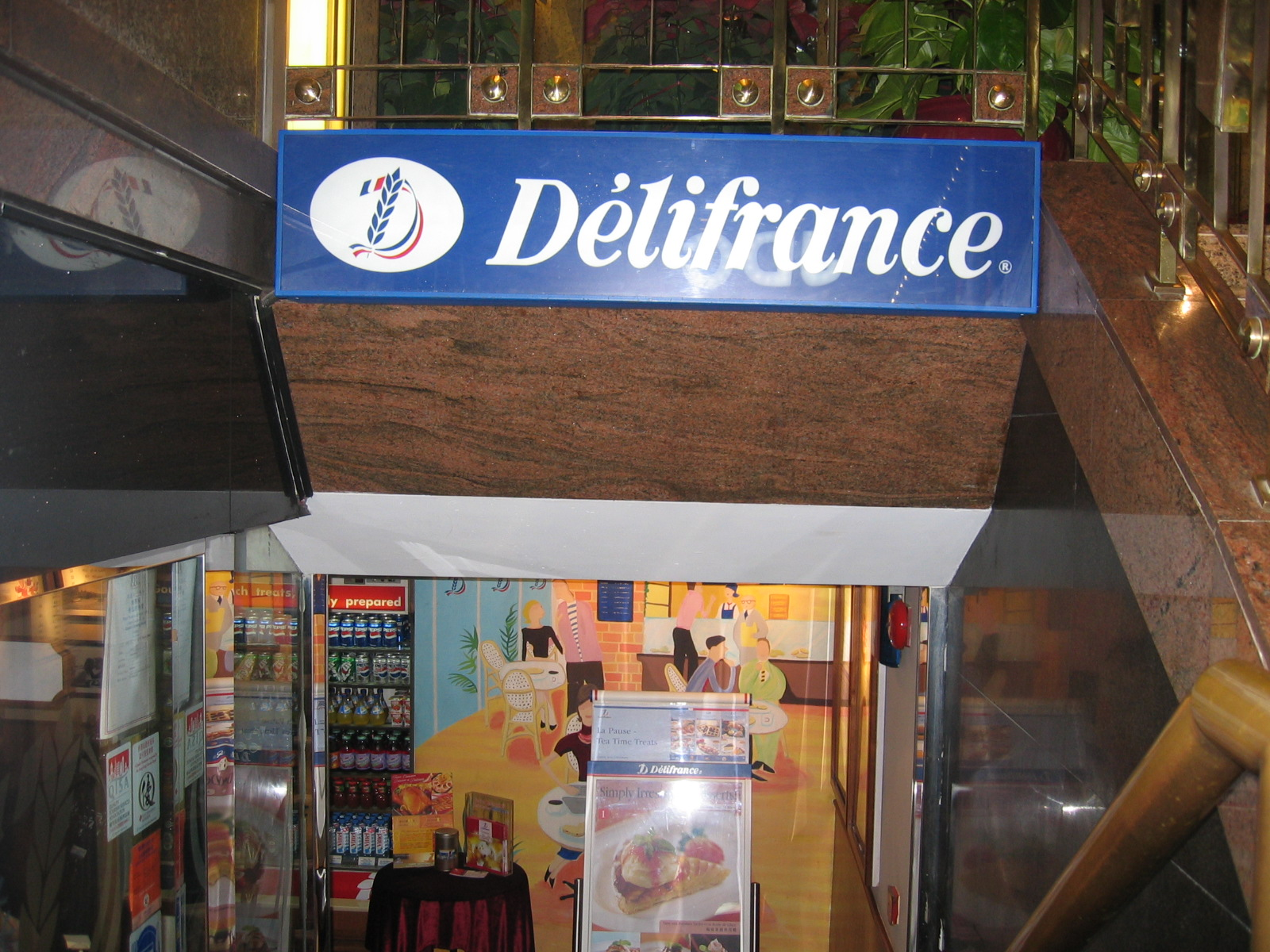
A Délifrance restaurant in Hong Kong

Délifrance is a company that produces "French style" bakery, savoury, and snacking products in over 100 countries, on five continents. It has been in operation since 1983. The sister company of Délifrance is Grands Moulins de Paris, a major French milling company that supplies 100% of the flour used in Délifrance products.

Délifrance has twelve subsidiaries in Europe and the Middle East. Its restaurants serve baked products such as croissants, gâteaux, fougasses, pains au chocolat, brioches, crisp pralines, and baguettes. Most Délifrance restaurants also serve beverages and pasta.

== History ==
In 1919, the Vilgrain family created Les Grands Moulins de Paris. Délifrance was born in 1983 and produced pastries, viennoiserie, and savoury products.

In 1997, Sembawang Corporation Limited acquired a controlling interest in Délifrance Asia Ltd. In 1999, Prudential Asset Management Asia Limited (PAMA) Group Inc. acquired 100% of Délifrance Asia Ltd and made it private.

In December 2007, Singapore-listed company Auric Pacific Group Limited purchased Délifrance Asia Ltd from PAMA; Auric Pacific Group was privatized in 2017.

In the Philippines, Jollibee Foods Corporation operated Délifrance from 1995 to 2010, when the companies severed ties. All former Délifrance restaurants in the Philippines were relaunched as CaféFrance, which was later sold by Jollibee to Euro-Med Laboratories Philippines, Inc.

Délifrance ran several franchises in Malaysia until 2015, but as of 2016, all outlets appeared to have closed without official notice. In 2020, the company returned to the Malaysian market with the opening of an outlet at Publika Shopping Gallery, in Kuala Lumpur.

In December 2025, it was announced that Délifrance would divest its British viennoiserie business, along with two production facilities in Avignon and Béthune, as part of remedies required to secure regulatory approval for its acquisition by the Belgian food group Vandemoortele. The sale was agreed with authorities, including the UK's Competition and Markets Authority, to address concerns over reduced competition in the frozen pastry market.

== See also ==
- List of bakery cafés
