= Carmen Soo =

Malaysian model and actress (born 1977)

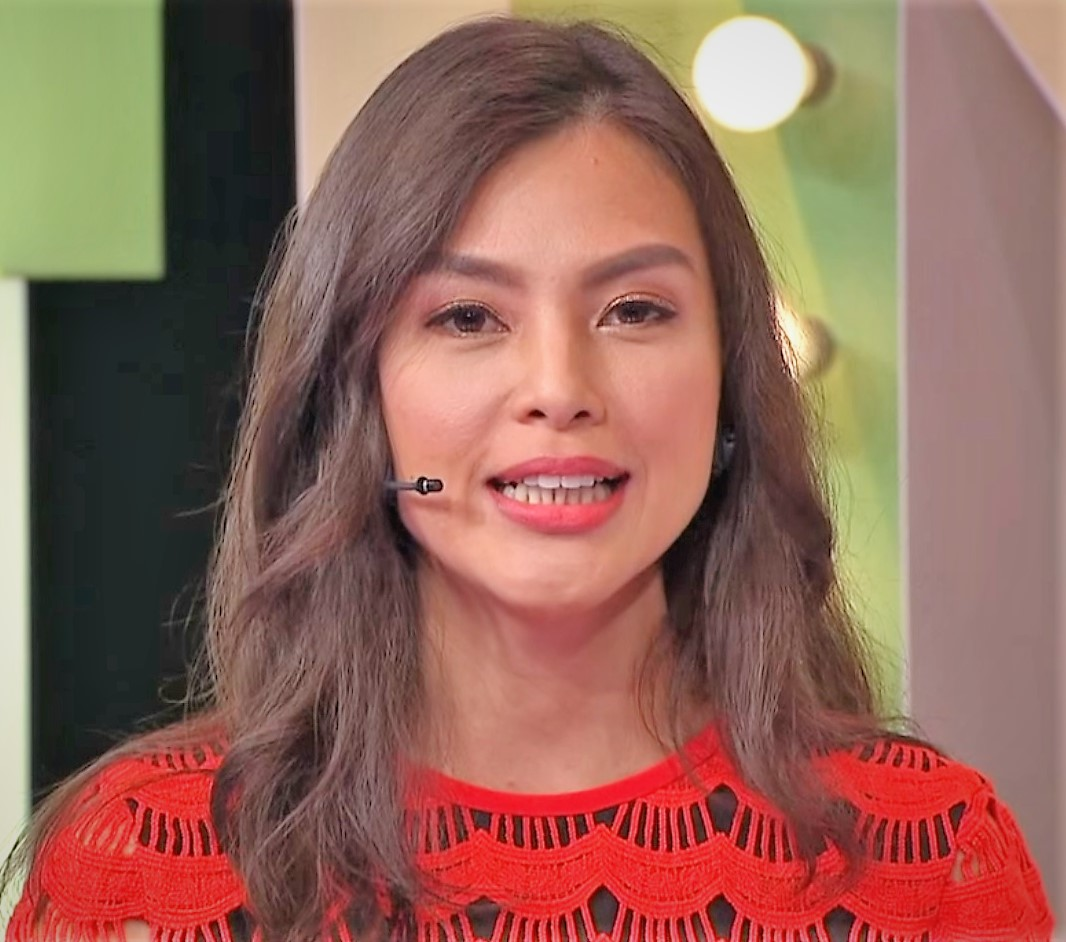
- Soo interviewed on MeleTOP in 2015
- Born: Soo Wai Ming; 14 October 1977 (age 49); Kuala Lumpur, Malaysia
- Occupations: Model; host; actress
- Years active: 1997−present
- Modeling information
- Height: 160 cm (5 ft 3 in)

Chinese name
- Traditional Chinese: 蘇慧敏
- Simplified Chinese: 苏慧敏
- Hanyu Pinyin: Sū Huìmǐn
- Jyutping: Sou^{1} Wai^{6} Man^{5}
- Hokkien POJ: So͘ Hūi-bín
- Website: carmensoo.com

Carmen Soo (born Soo Wai Ming; 14 October 1977) is a Malaysian model and actress.

== Life and career ==
Soo was born and raised in Kuala Lumpur, Malaysia, to a Chinese father and to a half-Chinese, half-British mother. She holds a bachelor's degree in business management and can speak fluent Malay, Cantonese and English while also learning Tagalog to help her television acting career in the Philippines. She was part owner of a boutique named 'Kushi' located in Bangsar.

In 2015, Soo married Benson Tan in Bali and they have one daughter. She currently resides in Petaling Jaya, Selangor with her family.

=== Modeling ===
Carmen Soo began modelling at age 17 and moved to Hong Kong at age 20 to pursue modelling career, which has brought her all over Asia, including Singapore. At 156 cm (just under 5'1") tall, her petite size is not conducive to catwalk modeling, hence most of her shoots tend to be print and television commercials. However, she has graced local magazines' covers such as New Man, V Mag, New Tide GLAM and Nu You. She is a spokesperson for international watch brand Longines along with Malaysian theatre personality Paula Malai Ali, and for Celcom with Singaporean singer JJ Lin. Soo is the brand ambassador of Uniqlo Malaysia. She is managed by Model One in Hong Kong.

=== Acting ===
Carmen started as an extra in the 1999 Jackie Chan movie entitled Gorgeous alongside Shu Qi, and later was in Aaron Kwok's musical special.

In September 2008, Carmen co-starred in an ABS-CBN (in collaboration with Malaysia's Double Vision) soap opera with Filipino actors Jericho Rosales, Cristine Reyes and Christopher de Leon in the teleserye Kahit Isang Saglit that was aired in the Philippines and Malaysia, and worldwide through TFC. Kahit Isang Saglit later earned a nomination in the International Emmy Award.

In 2010, Carmen appeared in a four-part series of Your Song entitled "Beautiful Girl" with Christian Bautista, which was shot through mid-July and August between Malaysia and the Philippines. In the same year, she appeared alongside JC De Vera in the third season of 5 Star Specials entitled Si Paco at ang Prinsesa, directed by Bb. Joyce Bernal on TV5.

Carmen was the lead actor in the Malaysian horror film The Hunter 3D, directed and written by Bjarne Wong. Soo then went on to perform on HBO Asia's Dead Mine as Su-Ling. She also appeared in the Singaporean horror film Ghost Child, alongside Chen Hanwei and Jayley Woo, as well as the legal drama series The Pupil and Code of Law with Vernetta Lopez.

=== Hosting ===
In 2009, Soo became a judge on It's Showtime. In April 2010, Soo became a co-host on Wowowee along with Kelly Misa, Jed Montero, Isabelle Abiera, RR Enriquez, Valerie Concepcion, Mariel Rodriguez and Pokwang.

== Filmography ==
=== Film ===
Year	Title	Role	Notes	Type
1999	Gorgeous	Gloria	A box office success in Hong Kong, grossing HK$40,545,889 during its theatrical run.	
2004	Visits: Hungry Ghost Anthology : Episode 1413	Maria		
2005	Baik Punya Cilok	Lina		
2006	The 3rd Generation	Linda	Won the "Most Promising Actress Award" at the Malaysian Film Festival 2006. Malaysia's first award-winning Cantonese movie starring Nicholas Teo and Amber Chia	
2008	Kurus	Miss Liew	Won the Special Jury Prize at the Bangkok International Film Festival and Golden Kinnaree Awards, under the South-East Asian Competition held by director Ming Jin-Woo	Independent film
2009	Sayang You Can Dance	Angel		
2009	Tenement 2	Isabel	First cameo role in the Philippines. T2 Box Office 95 Million. Earned US$430,776 on its opening weekend.	
2009	My Spy	Jade		
2011	Mein Herz in Malaysia	Dalina	Germany FFP New Media GmbH in Coproduction with Double Vision Malaysia for ARD Degeto.	Made for television
2012	The Hunter 3D			3D film
2012	Dead Mine	Su-Ling	HBO Asia's first original production after 20 years.	
2012	The Borneo Incident			
2012	Alagwa (Breakaway)		Recently made its world premiere at the 17th Busan International Film Festival in South Korea.	
2013	Double		Directed by Woo Ming-Jin. Part of an online Silent Terror Anthology of YOMYOMF Network on YouTube	Short film
2013	Ghost Child	Na		
2013	Love...and Other Bad Habits	Jess		
2013	Shuffle			Short film
2014	Yasmine	Mother		
2018	Orang Itu	Ching		
2018	Crazy Rich Asians	Francesca Shaw		
2020	Jebat	Aireen/Damia		
2022	Air Force The Movie: Selagi Bernyawa	Major Marya Lee		
2024	Baik Punya Ah Long	Amoi		

=== Television ===
Year	Title	Role	Network	Notes
2007	Ghost	Jenny	8TV	
2008	Kahit Isang Saglit	Margaret 'Garie' Hang-Li	ABS-CBN	Main Role / Protagonist
2008	Kurus (Days of the Turquoise Sky)	Miss Carol	NTV7	
2009	Ghost II	Jenny	8TV	
2009	Maalaala Mo Kaya: Videoke	Maria	ABS-CBN	
2010	Showtime	Judge	ABS-CBN	
2010	Wowowee	Co-Host	ABS-CBN	
2010	5 Star Specials: Si Paco at ang Prinsesa	Prinsesa Amara	TV5	
2010	Your Song: Beautiful Girl	Hannah	ABS-CBN	
2010–2012	The Pupil	Rachel Sung	Mediacorp	
2012–2015	Code of Law	Rachel Sung	Mediacorp	
2011	Maurice Lacroix Follow Your Convictions Private Sessions	Herself	NTV7	Episode 5
2011	Ang Asawa Kong Japeks	Lily	TV5	
2011	Showtime	Judge	ABS-CBN	
2011	Cyber Colors Glamour Girl Search	Mentor	8TV	Sasa Reality Search
2011	Dapur Selebriti Knorr	Herself	8TV	Reality cooking show
2012	The Apartment Style Edition	Guest Judge (Episode 8)	Star World	Shot in Malaysia Airing in 20 Countries in Asia
2012	Omg!	Herself	Diva Universal	
2016	The Hush	Valerie Teo	Mediacorp	
2017	Asia's Next Top Model	Host/Judge	Star World	Cycle 5
2022	One Cent Thief	Irene	Astro Ria	
2023	The Iron Heart	Harmonia	Kapamilya Channel, A2Z, Jeepney TV, TV5	Main Role / Protagonist
2023	Operandi Gerhana (Phantom Squad)	Lily	Netflix	Best Actress - Drama Series Pesta Perdana 2025

== Theatre ==
Year	Title	Role	Notes
2005	The Girl From Ipoh	The Girl From Ipoh	A Chinese make love story. Directed by Low Ngai Yuen with music direction by Penny Low The Theatre production by Integrated Expressions staged from 9 to 13 November 2005 at Pentas 1 KLPAC.
2007	Rose Rose I Love You	Xuan	Integrated Expressions presents a pop musical production inspired by the life and times of Rose Chan, the legendary erotic Cabaret Queen of Malaya. Directed by Low Ngai Yuen with music direction by Penny Low, Rose Rose I Love You is the second collaboration between Penny Low and Ngai Yuen since The Girl from Ipoh. Rose Rose I Love You staged at the Genting International Showroom from 2 to 4 Nov, and on 9 to 11 Nov It is mostly in English with some Cantonese/Mandarin dialogue (with subtitles). Also in the cast are Tony Eusoff, K.K. Wong, Ling Tan, Lim Tiong Wooi and Anrie Too.
2011	Angels & Demons BURLESQUE		Genting International Showroom

== Awards ==
- Most Promising Actress Award at the Malaysian Film Festival 2006
- Best Actress Award - Drama Series at the Pesta Perdana 2025
