= Code of Law =

Singaporean television series

- Also known as: Code of Law: Final (season 5)
- Genre: Police procedural; Legal drama
- Created by: Lee Thean-jeen
- Based on: Law & Order by Dick Wolf
- Starring: Vernetta Lopez; Keagan Kang; Joanne Peh; Carmen Soo; Fauzie Laily; Sunny Pang; Mathialagan (Note: credited as Mathialagan M); Sharon Ismail; Oon Shu An; Aaron Mossadeg; Adrian Pang; Cheryl Chitty Tan; Desmond Tan; Ian Fang; Jitenram Kiran Bala; Michelle Wong
- Theme music composer: Jeff Long
- Country of origin: Singapore
- Original language: English
- No. of seasons: 5
- No. of episodes: 63

Production
- Executive producers: Lee Thean-jeen; Lim Bee Lin
- Producer: Li Huanwen
- Production company: Weiyu Films

Original release
- Network: Channel 5
- Release: 20 September 2012 – 22 June 2020

Related
- The Pupil (2010–2011)

Code of Law (titled Code of Law: Final in its fifth season) is a Singaporean English-language police procedural and legal drama television series produced by Weiyu Films for Mediacorp's Channel 5. Created by Lee Thean-jeen, it was conceived as a spin-off of the legal drama series The Pupil. The show stars Vernetta Lopez, Keagan Kang, Joanne Peh, Carmen Soo, Fauzie Laily, Sunny Pang, Mathialagan, Sharon Ismail, Oon Shu An, Aaron Mossadeg, Adrian Pang, Cheryl Chitty Tan, Desmond Tan, Ian Fang, Jitenram Kiran Bala, and Michelle Wong.

Code of Law was originally broadcast from 20 September 2012 to 22 June 2020, running for five seasons and a total of 59 episodes. The series is available for streaming on MeWATCH in Singapore.

== Premise ==
The series revolves around a group of inspectors and lawyers who investigate and prosecute crimes committed in Singapore. The first half-hour is the investigation, while the second half-hour is about criminal defense lawyers fighting for the accused. The show was influenced by the American television series Law & Order. While the show's first three seasons revolve around various crimes every week, seasons 4 and 5 tells a more serialized story about fictional serial killer Derek Ho and also seeing various crimes having its own arcs.

== Cast ==
Character	Actor	Seasons				
Character	Actor	1	2	3	4	Final
DPP Vivian Lau	Vernetta Lopez	Main	Main	Main		
Jacob Fernandez	Keagan Kang	Main	Main	Main	Main	
Sabrina Wong	Joanne Peh	Main	Main	Main		
Rachel Sung	Carmen Soo	Main	Main	Main		
Insp.Razali Hamzah	Fauzie Laily	Main	Main	Main	Main	Main
Insp. Nick Han	Sunny Pang	Main	Main	Main	Main	
Sanjay Devaraj	Mathialagan	Main	Main	Main	Main	
Supt. Audrey Soh	Sharon Ismail	Main	Main	Main	Main	Main
Stephanie Szeto	Oon Shu An			Main	Main	
Derek Ho Zhi Zhong	Desmond Tan				Main	Main
Sam Dass	Jitenram Kiran Bala				Main	Main
SSSgt. Miki Lee	Michelle Wong				Main	Main
Elaine Loh	Rosalyn Lee				Main	Main
Brendan DeVries	Aaron Mossadeg					Main
SSgt. Issac Tan	Ian Fang					Main
Angela Ang Yi Mei	Janice Koh					Main
Dennis Tang Teng Soon	Adrian Pang	Guest				Main
Winnie Low	Cheryl Chitty Tan					Main

== Episodes ==
=== Season 1 ===
No. overall	No. in season	Title	Original air date
1	1	"Rosa"	20 September 2012
2	2	"Khalid"	27 September 2012
3	3	"Mr Tay"	4 October 2012
4	4	"Lawrence"	11 October 2012
5	5	"Wati"	18 October 2012
6	6	"Paul"	25 October 2012
7	7	"Wang"	1 November 2012
8	8	"Eve"	8 November 2012
9	9	"Lydia"	15 November 2012
10	10	"Steven"	24 November 2012

=== Season 2 ===
No. overall	No. in season	Title	Original air date
11	1	"Episode 1"	13 January 2014
12	2	"Episode 2"	20 January 2014
13	3	"Episode 3"	27 January 2014
14	4	"Episode 4"	3 February 2014
15	5	"Episode 5"	10 February 2014
16	6	"Episode 6"	17 February 2014
17	7	"Episode 7"	24 February 2014
18	8	"Episode 8"	3 March 2014
19	9	"Episode 9"	10 March 2014
20	10	"Episode 10"	17 March 2014
21	11	"Episode 11"	24 March 2014
22	12	"Episode 12"	31 March 2014

=== Season 3 ===
No. overall	No. in season	Title	Original air date
23	1	"Episode 1"	5 January 2015
24	2	"Episode 2"	12 January 2015
25	3	"Episode 3"	19 January 2015
26	4	"Episode 4"	26 January 2015
27	5	"Episode 5"	2 February 2015
28	6	"Episode 6"	9 February 2015
29	7	"Episode 7"	16 February 2015
30	8	"Episode 8"	23 February 2015
31	9	"Episode 9"	2 March 2015
32	10	"Episode 10"	9 March 2015
33	11	"Episode 11"	16 March 2015
34	12	"Episode 12"	30 March 2015
35	13	"Episode 13"	6 April 2015
36	14	"Episode 14"	13 April 2015
37	15	"Episode 15"	20 April 2015

=== Season 4 ===
No. overall	No. in season	Title	Original air date
38	1	"Episode 1"	2 April 2018
39	2	"Episode 2"	9 April 2018
40	3	"Episode 3"	16 April 2018
41	4	"Episode 4"	23 April 2018
42	5	"Episode 5"	30 April 2018
43	6	"Episode 6"	7 May 2018
44	7	"Episode 7"	14 May 2018
45	8	"Episode 8"	21 May 2018
46	9	"Episode 9"	4 June 2018
47	10	"Episode 10"	11 June 2018
48	11	"Episode 11"	18 June 2018

=== Season 5: Final ===
No. overall	No. in season	Title	Original air date
49	1	"Somebody Help"	25 May 2020
50	2	"Breaking News"	25 May 2020
51	3	"Derek Has Fans?"	25 May 2020
52	4	"You're One Of Us"	25 May 2020
53	5	"Titanium Sevens"	8 June 2020
54	6	"Give Up Derek"	8 June 2020
55	7	"Bring Me To Your Leader"	8 June 2020
56	8	"You Feel The Connection"	8 June 2020
57	9	"Derek Is In Survival Mode"	22 June 2020
58	10	"Helen"	22 June 2020
59	11	"He Had Help"	22 June 2020
60	12	"Don't Test Me Winnie"	22 June 2020
61	13	"Don't Worry About Me Anymore"	22 June 2020
62	14	"The Serial Killer Was Killed"	22 June 2020
63	15	"I Can't Hurt You Anymore (Finale)"	22 June 2020
