= Lee Thean-jeen =

Singaporean director (born 1968/69)

- Born: 1968 or 1969 (age 57–58); Penang, Malaysia
- Other name: Li Tianren
- Education: Penang Free School
- Alma mater: Boston University's College of Communication
- Occupations: Director; screenwriter
- Years active: 2000–present

Chinese name
- Chinese: 李天仁
- Hanyu Pinyin: Lǐ Tiānrén
- Jyutping: Lei5 Tin1 Jan4
- Hokkien POJ: Lí Thian-jîn
- Tâi-lô: Lí Thian-jîn

Lee Thean-jeen (born in 1968 or 1969) is a Singaporean director, screenwriter and television showrunner. He is best known for the Mediacorp's Channel 5 drama series AlterAsians, The Singapore Short Story Project, The Pupil, Code of Law, Zero Calling, Reunion, 128 Circle and This Land Is Mine.

He has also written or co-written, and directed the feature films Homecoming, Love...and Other Bad Habits, Everybody's Business, Bring Back the Dead and The Big Day.

He was also a writer, director and executive producer on the Southeast Asian adaptation of the Scandinavian noir series, The Bridge for Viu and HBO Asia. In 2019, he created Singapore's first multilingual drama, 128 Circle.

He is currently the managing director of Weiyu Films, a self-founded content-creation and production company.

== Early life ==
Born in Penang, Malaysia, Lee attended Penang Free School, then graduated with a summa cum laude in Broadcasting And Film from Boston University's College of Communication.

== Career ==
After graduating from college, Lee went to work for the then-Singapore Broadcasting Corporation, producing corporate videos, before leaving to become one of the founding members of Film Formations, a Singapore-based production company.

His first drama series, AlterAsians (2000), an adaptation of short stories by Singaporean novelists into telemovies and shot on 16mm film, won several awards, including Best Single Drama or Telemovie at the Asian Television Awards 2000.

A follow-up series of short story adaptations, The Singapore Short Story Project, won the Asian Television Award in 2003 for Best Drama Series and again, in 2008, for Best Single Drama or Telemovie.

The Pupil, a legal drama which he co-created, executive-produced, wrote, and directed was well received by local audiences and critics alike, winning two major awards at the 2010 Asian Television Awards: Best Actress In A Leading Role for Rebecca Lim and Best Actor In A Supporting Role for Lim Kay Tong.

Code of Law, a drama series on the criminal justice system in Singapore, has entered its fifth season, and spawned a universe of spin-off shows: Derek, its sequel Derek II and Forensik. All these shows have crossover characters and continuing storylines that culminate in 2020's Code of Law: Final.

Zero Calling, a vigilante thriller based on a script by Lee, has entered its second season, after picking up a Best Actor award for its leading actor, Pierre Png, and a Silver Remi for Best TV Miniseries at the WorldFest Houston International Film Festival.

Lee was the first director to occupy Discovery Networks Asia's Documentary Director's Chair, a crossover programme for film and television filmmakers who have built a reputation for innovative, high-quality filmmaking to produce documentary work for Discovery Channel's global network.

His first feature film, Homecoming, starring Jack Neo, Ah Niu, Afdlin Shauki and Rebecca Lim was one of the top-grossing local films in Singapore and Malaysia in 2011.

More recently, he was co-executive producer and director on The Bridge, an Asian adaptation of the award-winning Scandinavian noir of the same name.

== Legacy ==
He has appeared on The Straits Times' Power List in Entertainment, a barometer of the top ten most influential people in the local media industry. In 2018, he was named in Variety as one of Singapore's 10 TV players to look out for.

== Filmography ==
=== Feature films ===
- Homecoming (2011)
- Love...and Other Bad Habits (2013)
- Everybody's Business (2013)
- Bring Back the Dead (2015)
- The Big Day (2018)

=== Television series ===
- Life, Unexpected (2024) - Executive Producer-Director-Writer
- 128 Circle Season 3 (2023) - Executive Producer-Director-Writer
- 128 Circle Season 2 (2022) - Executive Producer-Director-Writer
- This Land Is Mine (2021) - Executive Producer-Director-Writer
- Reunion (2021) - Executive Producer-Director-Writer
- 128 Circle: Shaking Legs (2020) - Executive Producer-Director-Writer
- Code of Law: Final (2020) - Executive Producer-Director-Writer
- The Bridge 2 (2020) - Co-executive Producer-Director
- Forensik (2020) - Executive Producer-Director-Writer
- 128 Circle (2019) - Executive Producer-Director-Writer
- The Bridge (2018) - Executive Producer-Director-Writer
- Snoops (2018) - Executive Producer
- Code of Law (2012-2018) - Executive Producer-Director-Writer
- The Hush (2016) - Executive Producer-Director-Writer
- Zero Calling (2014-2015 - ) Executive Producer-Director-Writer
- The School Bell Rings (2013-2015) - Executive Producer-Director-Writer
- The Pupil (2010-2011) - Executive Producer-Director-Writer
- Calefare (2008) - Executive Producer-Director-Writer
- Sense Of Home (2008) - Executive Producer-Director-Writer
- After Hours (2007) - Executive Producer-Director-Writer
- Déjà vu (French TV Series) (2007) - Director, 4 episodes
- The Singapore Short Story Project (2003-2007) - Executive Producer-Director-Writer
- Chase (2003) - Executive Producer-Director-Writer
- Restless (2002) - Executive Producer-Director-Writer
- AlterAsians (2000-2001) - Executive Producer-Director-Writer

=== Web series ===
- Derek II (2019) - Executive Producer-Director-Writer
- I See You 看见看不见的你 (2019) - Executive Producer-Director-Writer
- Derek (2019) - Executive Producer-Director-Writer
- Divided 分裂 (2018) - Executive Producer-Director-Writer

=== Telemovies ===
- Rise (2016) - Director-Writer
- Wa-cheew! Rise Of A Kung Fu Chef (2016) - Executive Producer
- Two Boys And A Mermaid (2015) - Executive Producer
- Gone Case (2014) - Executive Producer-Screenwriter
- The Million Dollar Job: Raffles' Gold (2013) - Executive Producer-Director-Writer
- The Million Dollar Job (2012) - Executive Producer-Director-Writer
- Love 50%(爱情折扣) (2010) - Director
- Stories Of Love: A New Best Friend (2006) - Writer-Director
- Spoilt (2005) - Director-Screenwriter
- Amnesia (2002) - Director

=== Documentaries ===
- The Tokyo Shock Boys' Guide To Japan (2005, National Geographic) - Director-Writer
- Gourmet China: A Living Legacy (2005, Discovery Asia) - Director

=== Short films ===
- Timepieces(2017) - Director-Writer

== Awards and nominations ==
128 Circle Season 2

- Winner, Best Original Song for an Asian TV Programme or Movie, 2022 ContentAsia Awards
- Nominee, Best Actress In A Supporting Role, 2022 Asian Television Awards

This Land Is Mine

- Winner, Best Drama Series/Telefilm Made For A Single Asian Market, 2022 ContentAsia Awards
- Winner, Best Supporting Actress, 2022 Asia Content Awards
- Nominee, Best Actor, 2022 Asia Content Awards
- National Winner, Best Drama Series, 2022 Asian Academy Creative Awards
- National Winner, Best Actor In A Leading Role, 2022 Asian Academy Creative Awards
- National Winner, Best Actress In A Leading Role, 2022 Asian Academy Creative Awards
- National Winner, Best Direction (Fiction), 2022 Asian Academy Creative Awards
- Winner, Best Sound, 2022 Asian Academy Creative Awards
- Nominee, Best Drama Series, 2022 Asian Television Awards
- Nominee, Best Actress In A Leading Role, 2022 Asian Television Awards
- Nominee, Best Actor In A Supporting Role, 2022 Asian Television Awards
- Nominee, Best Cinematography, 2022 Asian Television Awards
- Nominee, Best Editing, 2022 Asian Television Awards
- Best Drama Shortlist, 2022 Rose D'Or Awards

The Bridge

- Nominee, Best Director Of A Scripted TV Programme, 2020 ContentAsia Awards

Derek II

- Nominee, Best Short-Form Drama Series, 2020 ContentAsia Awards

Divided 分裂

- Country Winner, Singapore, Best Original Programme by a Streamer/OTT, 2018 Asian Academy Creative Awards

The Hush

- Nominee, Best Actor In A Leading Role (Tony Eusoff), Asian Television Awards 2017
- Nominee, Best Actor In A Leading Role (Remesh Panicker), Asian Television Awards 2017
- Nominee, Best Original Screenplay, Asian Television Awards 2017
- Nominee, Best Drama Series, Asian Television Awards 2016
- Nominee, Best Direction (Fiction), Asian Television Awards 2016
- Nominee, Best Original Screenplay, Asian Television Awards 2016

Rise

- Highly Commended, Best Actor In A Supporting Role (Pierre Png), Asian Television Awards 2016

Bring Back The Dead

- Best Theatrical Feature, Platinum Remi, WorldFest-Houston International Film Festival 2015

Zero Calling

- Best TV Miniseries, Silver Remi, WorldFest-Houston International Film Festival 2014
- Best Actor in a Leading Role, Asian Television Awards 2014 (Pierre Png) (also nominated in 2015)
- Highly Commended, Best Original Screenplay, Asian Television Awards 2014
- Nominee, Best Direction, Asian Television Awards 2014
- Second Prize, Television Drama Category, National Scriptwriting Competition

Code of Law

- Nominee, Best Digital Fiction and Non-fiction Programme or Series, Asian Television Awards 2015
- Nominee, Best Original Screenplay, Asian Television Awards 2013

The Pupil

- Finalist Award, New York Festivals 2011
- Best Direction Commendation, Asian Television Awards 2010
- Best Actress in a Leading Role, Asian Television Awards 2010 (Rebecca Lim)
- Best Actor in a Supporting Role, Asian Television Awards 2010 (Lim Kay Tong)

Homecoming (笑着回家)

- Best Actor, Golden Wau Awards 2013 (Jack Neo)

The Singapore Short Story Project

- Best Single Drama or Telemovie, Asian Television Awards 2008 (The Other)
- Best Drama Series, Asian Television Awards 2003
- Best Cinematography, Asian Television Awards 2003
- Best Editing Commendation, Asian Television Awards 2003

AlterAsians

- Best Single Drama or Telemovie, Asian Television Awards 2000 (Iris’ Rice Bowl)
- Finalist Award, New York Festivals 2000 (Or Else, The Lightning God)
- Highly Commended, Best Single Drama or Telemovie, Asian Television Awards 2001 (The Man In The Cupboard)
