= The Leap Years =

- Directed by: Jean Yeo
- Written by: Jean Yeo; Alain Layrac; Fina Torres; George Walker T Catherine Lim (novel)
- Produced by: Chan Pui Yin; Ng San San
- Starring: Wong Lilin; Ananda Everingham; Qi Yuwu; Joan Chen
- Release date: 29 February 2008
- Country: Singapore
- Language: English

The Leap Years (also known as Leap of Love) is a Singaporean film produced by Mediacorp Raintree Pictures, based on the novella Leap of Love by the author Catherine Lim. The production for the film started in 2005, and the film was initially to be released in December 2005 release. It was released on February 29, 2008 in Singapore, grossing over S$1 million at the box office, making it Singapore's highest-grossing local English-language film.

== Plot ==
Li-Ann, a single and attractive teacher in a Singaporean girls' school teaches her students about an obscure leap year custom practiced in Ireland, where men cannot refuse a proposal or date from a woman should she do so on February 29; she chances upon Jeremy at Windows Cafe who becomes a major part of her life.

=== Setting ===
In the original story, the cafe was called the Blue Paradise Café, while in the movie it was Windows Cafe. (Windows Cafe was an actual restaurant at Club Street, Singapore, at the time the movie was filmed. Though by the time the film opened, it had been replaced by a new restaurant called Seven On Club.)

== Cast ==
- Wong Lilin as Li-Ann (younger years - ages 24 to 36)
- Ananda Everingham as Jeremy Harvey (younger years - ages 24 to 36)
- Qi Yuwu as KS
- Joan Chen as Li-Ann (older years - age 48)
- Jason Keng-Kwin Chan as Raymond
- Vernetta Lopez as Jennie
- Nadya Hutagalung as Suneetha
- Paula Malai Ali as Kim
- Tracy Tan as Dyllan

== Production ==
The story involving Joan Chen is not part of the novella. According to director Jean Yeo, it was added as a marketing decision to get Chen involved, as her presence could help with the distribution of the film. It was shot separately, and the 9 minutes of Chen's part was shot by the second unit director.

Wong's husband Allan Wu makes a very brief cameo appearance as Danny, the husband of Kim (Paula Malai Ali), during Li-Ann's second leap year of meeting Jeremy.
