= Third Rail (TV series) =

Singapore TV series

- Genre: Psychological; Thriller; Drama
- Directed by: Yeo Lay Har
- Starring: Rebecca Lim; Andie Chen; Jason Godfrey; Nurul Aini; Vanessa Vanderstraaten; Benjamin Heng; Shrey Bhargava
- Opening theme: Power by Carla D
- Country of origin: Singapore
- Original language: English
- No. of seasons: 1
- No. of episodes: 12

Production
- Executive producers: Pedro Tan; Jean Yeo; Geraldine Phua
- Running time: approx. 48 minutes per episode (excluding advertisements)

Original release
- Network: Mediacorp Channel 5 MeWATCH
- Release: 17 October – 21 November 2022

Third Rail is a Singaporean English-language drama produced by Ochre Pictures and distributed by Mediacorp.

The first two episodes premiered on MeWATCH on 17 October 2022, with two new episodes added every Monday. The series began airing on Mediacorp's YouTube drama channel and Channel 5 on 25 and 31 October 2022, respectively.

== Cast ==
- Rebecca Lim as Geraldine Hyak (Geri)
- Vanessa Vanderstraaten as Chia Wen Si
- Jason Godfrey as Joseph Mandez
- Andie Chen as John Ho
- Amanda Ang as Seah Su Jin
- Carla Dunareanu as Valerie Keng-North (Val)
- Benjamin Heng as Choy Boon Wee
- Shrey Bhargava as Rajeev Khanna (Raj)
- Brian Ng as Ray Huang
- Ky Tan Xing Hua as Shawn Kong
- Nurul Aini as Jana
- Gerald Chew as Prof Lau
- David Eung Hao as Jacob Seah
- David Matthew as Titus Bhagawan
- Cassandra Spykerman as Kartini Puspa
- Keagan Kang as Susilo Bhagawan
- Benjamin Eio as Chee

== Production ==
The set of the series was housed inside one of Changi Exhibition Centre's hall, which featured two decommissioned Kawasaki Heavy Industries C151 MRT train carriages (Carriage no. 3095 and 1095 of 095/096) and a specially constructed railway tunnel. It was also one of the biggest to be built in Singapore.

== Awards and nominations ==
Year	Award	Category	Nominee(s)	Result	Ref.
2023	ContentAsia Awards	Best Factual Programme made in Asia for a Single Asia Market	Third Rail – Behind The Scenes Special	Silver	
