= Adrian Pang =

Singaporean actor (born 1966)

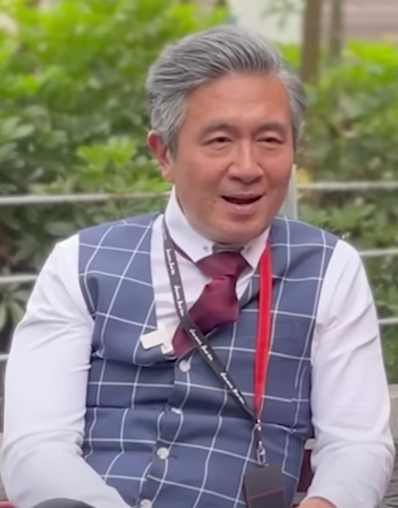
- Pang in 2022
- Born: 8 January 1966 (age 60); Malacca, Malaysia
- Education: Anglo-Chinese School; Anglo-Chinese Junior College
- Alma mater: Keele University; ARTTS International
- Occupations: Actor; producer; host
- Years active: 1990s-present
- Agent: FLY Entertainment
- Spouse: Tracie Pang (married 1994 or 1995–present)
- Children: 2

Chinese name
- Traditional Chinese: 彭耀順
- Simplified Chinese: 彭耀顺
- Hanyu Pinyin: Péng Yàoshùn

Adrian Pang Yeow Soon (born 8 January 1966) is a Singaporean actor, host, and contracted artiste under FLY Entertainment. A full-time Mediacorp artiste from 1990 to 2010, Pang first came to prominence in the Singapore television scene with his performances in both English-language and Chinese-language television dramas produced by MediaCorp and SPH MediaWorks in the 1990s. Since then, he has taken roles in hosting and theatre production.

In 2010, Pang left MediaCorp to set up his theatre company, Pangdemonium, with his wife and produced several plays. Pangdemonium would close in 2026.

== Early life ==
Pang was born in Malacca, Malaysia, but emigrated to Singapore shortly after with his family when he was four years old. He was educated at Anglo-Chinese School and Anglo-Chinese Junior College. Although he graduated with a law degree from Keele University in England, he did not practice. After his graduation from Keele University, he trained at the ARTTS International in Bubwith.

He worked for a number of years in British theatre and television before returning to Singapore. While he was based in Britain, he would occasionally return to Singapore for stage work where he first caught the eye of Singaporeans when he starred in the Singaporean comedy film Forever Fever (1998).

== Career ==
In 2014, Pang wrote his first book for children, Hansel and Girl Girl. The children's picture book, illustrated by Cultural Medallion winner Milenko Prvacki, transplants the traditional Hansel and Gretel fairy tale to a Singapore setting. Published by Epigram Books, part of the proceeds went to charity.

=== Theatre career ===
Pang had also appeared in various theatrical performances such as Forbidden City: Portrait of An Empress (2002), The Odd Couple (2004), A Twist of Fate (2005), The Dresser (2006) and many others.

In late 2012, Pang starred in the Singapore Repertory Theatre's production of God of Carnage. The next year, he went on to star in a stage adaptation of Rabbit Hole opposite popular actress Janice Koh.

==== Pangdemonium ====
In January 2010, Pang announced that after his current artiste contract with Mediacorp expired in March of that year, he would "experimentally" leave the entertainment industry, and establish a drama company with his wife, to be called "Pangdemonium!". According to Pang, the "experimental" leave was made possible via a prior arrangement with Mediacorp executives, and that he is open to returning to Mediacorp, or act in Mediacorp projects, in the future. At this time he did not appear for the last few episodes in New City Beat and acted in Channel 8 drama series With You.

Pangdemonium!'s inaugural production was The Full Monty held in June 2010, based on The Full Monty. Their next production, Closer showed from February to March 2011. Their third play, Dealer's Choice was played from 29 September to 12 October 2011. They went on to produce Spring Awakening in February 2012 and Swimming with Sharks in September 2012.

2026 would be Pangdemonium's final year with the couple attributing the closure to personal reasons.

=== Media career ===
While in England, Pang also acted bit parts in television series like The Fragile Heart with Nigel Hawthorne and films such as Tony Scott’s Spy Game and Night Watch with Pierce Brosnan.

==== Joining SPH MediaWorks ====
In December 2000, it was announced that Pang had agreed to switch to SPH MediaWorks as a producer-presenter. He quickly established himself as a household name through his work on SPH MediaWorks Channel i. A versatile talent, he excelled in hosting as well as acting, such as in the comedy Durian King and the main actor in the channel's final production, Six Weeks, before its impending merger with Mediacorp in 2005. An original idea of his, Pang co-wrote Six Weeks and was part of the creative process from start to finish.

==== Moving to Mediacorp ====
In 2017, after the merger of SPH MediaWorks and Mediacorp, Pang was transferred back to Mediacorp. He went on to appear in Chinese dramas on Channel 8, such as the blockbuster drama Portrait of Home in 2005. His portrayal of the eccentric Dadi earned him a Best Actor nomination in Star Awards 2005. Pang admitted he had much difficulty acting in the show. He even describes himself as a 'kentang', a Malay term, to describe someone who is very Westernised.

Pang also starred in Jack Neo's romantic comedy I Do I Do (2005) with Sharon Au. He also appeared on Makan King on Channel U, Nine Lives on Arts Central and Maggi & Me on Mediacorp Channel 5. In March 2007, he clinched the coveted Best Actor award at the national Life! Theater Awards for 2006.

Pang's humour makes him one of the more sought-after hosts in Singaporean media. He was the host for The Arena and Deal or No Deal aired on Mediacorp Channel 5. He has also helped to host the National Day Parade Celebrations in Singapore as well as Miss Singapore Universe.

He also played the male lead in the series Parental Guidance opposite Hong Kong actress, Jessica Hsuen. That was also the first time Pang played a legal professional on television.

In 2008, Pang filmed a Chinese drama serial, Nanny Daddy, which was telecast on Channel 8 in September that year.

In 2009, he snared a leading role as a "blind" lawyer named Alex Sung bent on revenge in the Channel 5 blockbuster drama Red Thread and clinched the "Best Actor" award at the 14th Asian Television Awards (ATA).

In January 2010, Pang announced that he would not recontract with Mediacorp after it expires in March.

In 2012, Pang starred in the Mediacorp Raintree Pictures movie Dance Dance Dragon (龙众舞) alongside Kym Ng and Dennis Chew. The movie was aired in all local cinemas during the Lunar New Year period.

Pang was later best known to play the fictional role of a senior lawyer, Dennis Tang, in MediaCorp's The Pupil and Code of Law television drama series.

Pang was the creative director for the Singapore National Day Parade in 2022.

== Personal life ==
Pang married Tracie Pang in 1994 or 1995. They have two sons, the younger of whom is Xander Pang.

In 2001, Pang moved back to Singapore permanently with his family.

== Filmography ==
=== Television series ===
Year	Title	Role	Notes	Ref
1999	Bugs	Tachibana	Season 4	
2000	Arabian Nights	Gulnare		
2005	Portrait of Home	Zhou Dadi		
2005	Portrait of Home II (同心圆2)	Zhou Dadi		
2006–2008	Maggi & Me	Johnny Tan		
2007–2008	Parental Guidance	James Seto		
2007	Do Not Disturb : Lunch Hour			
2008	Nanny Daddy	Liu Zhuolun		
2009	Polo Boys	Gregory Koh		
2009	Red Thread	Alex Sung		
2010	With You	Zhou Wen-an		
2010 - 2011	The Pupil	Dennis Tang Teng Soon		
2011	Code of Law	Dennis Tang Teng Soon	Season 1	
2012	The Kitchen Musical	Bryan S		
2017	SeNT	Zacheus Lee		
2018−2020	The Bridge	Commander Lim Boon Teck		
2019	Lion Mums	Ho Kang Peng	Season 3	
2019	I See You (看见看不见的你)	Zhong Zhiwen		
2020	Code of Law	Dennis Tang Teng Soon	Season 5	
2021−2022	Lion Mums	Ho Kang Peng	Season 4	
2022	Little Women	Calvin Ng / Hotel Manager	Cameo	
2025	Doctor Who	Consultant	Series 15	

=== Film ===
Year	Title	Role	Notes	Ref
1995	Night Watch	Korean technician		
1998	Forever Fever	Hock		
1999	Everybody Loves Sunshine			
2000	Second Generation	Jimmy		
2000	Night Swimmer	Kenneth		
2001	Spy Game	Jiang		
2005	I Do, I Do	Lee Ah Peng		
2007	Gone Shopping	Valentine Tan		
2007	Men in White			
2008	The Carrot Cake Conversations	Matthew		
2008	Pulua Hantu	Damian Lee		
2009	The Blue Mansion	Wee Teck Meng		
2012	Dance Dance Dragon	Eric Tan		
2012	Bait	Jessup		
2012	The Bouncer		Short film	
2013	Sex.Violence.FamilyValues	The director		
2013	Judgement Day	Prime Minister		
2014	Unlucky Plaza	Sky / Terence Chia		
2015	Blackhat	Keith Yan		
2015	The Faith of Anna Waters	Father Matthew Tan		
2018	Boi	Gordon		
2018	Republic of Food	Chia Kau Peng		
2020	The Pitch	Himself	Short film	
2022	#LookAtMe	Pastor Josiah Long		
2022	Before Life After Death	Raymond Kwan		
2023	Sunday	Mr Lee		
2024	Elevator	Byron		

=== Shows hosted ===
Year	Title	Notes	Ref
2000–2004	Yummy King		
2001	The Big Buffet		
2002	Chingay Parade		
2002	Singapore Film Festival		
2002	Singapore National Day Parade (pre-parade)		
2003	Chingay Parade		
2004	Top 10 十不相瞒		
2005	Singapore National Day Parade		
2005–2006	Makan King 好吃王		
2006	Chingay Parade		
2006	Miss Singapore Universe finals		
2007	The Arena I		
2007	Code Red 爱上小红点		
2007	Phua Chu Kang Pte Ltd Wrap Party	End of series wrap-up	
2007	Miss Singapore Universe finals		
2007–2008	Deal or No Deal		
2009	Don't Forget the Lyrics!	English edition, Comic Mayhem episode	
2009	New City Beat 城人新杂志	Co-hosted with Gurmit Singh, Bryan Wong and Kym Ng	
2012–2013	Chasing Happiness	Channel NewsAsia programme	

== Theatre ==
Year	Title	Role	Location
1993	The Magic Fundoshi	The Servant, The Wife, The Acolyte	Mu-Lan Theatre Company, London
1993	Hair	Tribe	The Old Vic, UK
1994	Into the Woods	Jack	Singapore Repertory Theater, Singapore
1995	Privates on Parade	Ming	Greenwich Theatre, UK
1995	Little Shop of Horrors	Seymour	Singapore Repertory Theater, Singapore
1996	The Glass Menagerie	Tom Wingfield	Singapore Repertory Theater, Singapore
1996	The Magic Fundoshi	The Servant, The Wife, The Acolyte	Singapore Repertory Theater, Singapore
1997	Hamlet	Prince Hamlet	Singapore Repertory Theater, Singapore
1997	New Territories	Wong, Monkey	Yellow Earth Theatre, London
1998	Take Away	Damien	Mu-Lan Theatre Company, London
1999, 2000	They're Playing Our Song	Vernon	Singapore Repertory Theater, Manila, Philippines
2001	Barefoot in the Park	Paul	Singapore Repertory Theater, Singapore
2004	The Odd Couple	Felix Ungar, Oscar Madison	Singapore Repertory Theater, Singapore
2005	A Twist of Fate	Uncle Albert	VizPro Entertainment / Singapore Repertory Theater, Singapore
2006	The Dresser	Norman	Singapore Repertory Theater, Singapore
2007, 2008	The Pillowman	Tupolski	Singapore Repertory Theater, Singapore
2009	Much Ado About Nothing	Benedick	Singapore Repertory Theater, Singapore
2010	The Full Monty	Jerry	Pangdemonium, Singapore
2011	Into the Woods	The Baker	Singapore
2011	Dealer's Choice	Stephen	Pangdemonium, Singapore
2011	Closer	Larry	Pangdemonium, Singapore
2012	God of Carnage	Michael	Atlantis Production / Singapore Repertory Theater, Singapore
2012	Swimming with Sharks	Buddy Ackerman	Pangdemonium, Singapore
2012	Spring Awakening	Headmaster Knochenbruch	Pangdemonium, Singapore
2013	Rabbit Hole	Howie Corbett	Pangdemonium, Singapore
2013	Next to Normal	Dan	Pangdemonium, Singapore
2014	The Rise and Fall of Little Voice	Raysay	Pangdemonium, Singapore
2014	Frozen	Ralph	Pangdemonium, Singapore
2015	Circle Mirror Transformation	Shultz	Pangdemonium, Singapore
2015	Tribes	Dad	Pangdemonium, Singapore
2015	Chinglish	Minister Cai Guoliang	Pangdemonium, Singapore
2019	Late Company	Bill	Victoria Theatre, Singapore
2019	This Is What Happens To Pretty Girls	Lester	Drama Centre Theatre, Singapore
2024	Salesman in China	Ying Ruocheng	Stratford Festival, Canada
2026	The Karate Kid The Musical	Mr. Miyagi	UK Tour & Toronto

== Bibliography ==
- Pang, Adrian (2013). Hansel and Girl Girl. Milenko Prvacki. Singapore. ISBN 978-981-07-3182-3. OCLC 1007705718.

== Awards and nominations ==
=== Star Awards ===
Year	Ceremony	Category	Nominated work	Result	Ref
2005	Star Awards	Best Actor	Portrait of Home	Nominated	
2005	Star Awards	Top 10 Most Popular Male Artistes	—N/a	Nominated	
2006	Star Awards	Best Actor	Portrait of Home II	Nominated	
2006	Star Awards	Top 10 Most Popular Male Artistes	—N/a	Nominated	
2007	Star Awards	Top 10 Most Popular Male Artistes	—N/a	Nominated	
2009	Star Awards	Best Actor	Nanny Daddy	Nominated	
2009	Star Awards	Top 10 Most Popular Male Artistes	—N/a	Nominated	

=== Asian Television Awards ===
Year	Award	Category	Work	Result	Ref
2003	Asian Television Awards	Best Comedy Actor	Ah Girl II	Nominated	
2007	Asian Television Awards	Best Comedy Actor	Maggi & Me	Nominated	
2009	Asian Television Awards	Best Actor	Red Thread	Won	
