= The Bridge (2018 TV series) =

Malaysian–Singaporean television series

- Genre: Crime; Detective; Thriller; Action
- Based on: Broen/Bron by Hans Rosenfeldt
- Written by: Chi-ren Choong
- Directed by: Lee Thean-jeen
- Starring: Bront Palarae; Rebecca Lim
- Opening theme: "Decadence of My Love" by Zee Avi
- Countries of origin: Malaysia; Singapore
- Original languages: English; Malay
- No. of seasons: 2
- No. of episodes: 20

Production
- Executive producers: Min Lim; Sahana Kamath; Fotini Paraskakis; Lee Thean-jeen; Arun Prakash (Viu); Kingsley Warner (Viu)
- Producers: Simon Long; Wong Soon Teng; Eva Yee
- Editor: Cheah Foong Foong
- Running time: 60 minutes
- Production company: Double Vision

Original release
- Network: HBO Asia; Viu
- Release: 26 November 2018 – 17 August 2020

The Bridge is a Malaysian–Singaporean crime drama television series aired on HBO Asia, and starring Rebecca Lim and Bront Palarae. The series was inspired by the Danish–Swedish series, Broen/Bron. Season 1 was released in 2018 and Season 2 was released on 15 June 2020.

== Plot ==
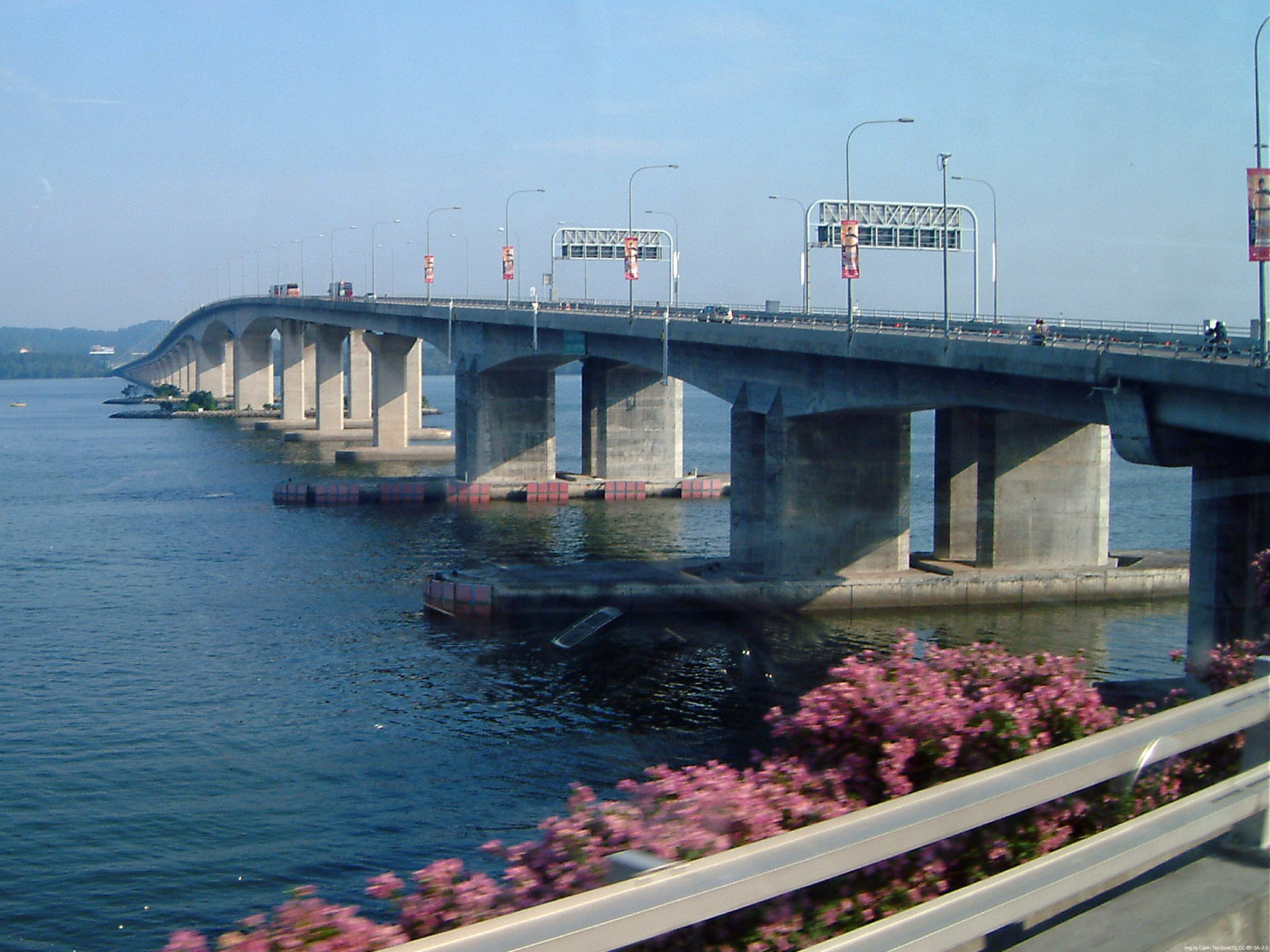
The Bridge in 2005

The series takes place on the border of Malaysia and Singapore. Its centerpiece is the bridge on the border where a female corpse was discovered. The Malaysian Investigator is Detective Megat Jamil, the Singaporean is Detective Serena Teo. Together they investigate a series of crimes that are well prepared, skillfully executed and contain a "message" to society on the subject of social injustice.

== Cast ==
=== Main ===
- Bront Palarae as Megat Jamil
- Rebecca Lim as Serena Teo
- Ario Bayu as Heriyanto Salim (season 2)

=== Recurring ===
- Adrian Pang as Lim Boon Teck (seasons 1–2)
- Susan Lankester as Maria Othman (seasons 1–2)
- Cheryl Samad as Erin Tajuddin (seasons 1–2)
- Izzat Mushtaq as Yusof Iskandar (seasons 1–2)
- Tony Eusoff as Nabil / Adam (season 1)
- Dia Farhana as Mia (season 1)
- Syed Muhammad Husayn as Imran (season 1)
- Syed Ali Murtadha as Farid (season 1)
- Charles Roberts as Reuben Kumar (season 1)
- Erwin Dawson as Jason (season 1)
- Gavin Yap as Daniel Chong (season 1)
- Dawn Cheong as Chen Seet Yan (season 1)
- Alvin Wong as Lee Jun Weng (season 1)
- Keagan Kang as Clarence Richmond (season 1)
- Belinda Chee as Michelle Richmond (season 1)
- Pablo Amirul as Jamal Mokhtar (season 1)
- Chacko Vadaketh as Anil Raj (season 1)
- Miller Khan as Arif Hilmi (season 2)
- Amanda Manopo as Dian Galih (season 2)
- Wan Hanafi Su as Datuk Ishak Hassan (season 2)
- Aida Aris as Datin Roslinda Ahmad (season 2)
- Fikry Ibrahim as Zeckri Ishak (season 2)
- Alicia Amin as Lyanna Mokhtar (season 2)
- Lukman Sardi as Bayu Soemarsono (season 2)
- Whulandary Herman as Indah Pangestu (season 2)
- Joseph Marco as Christian Salvador (season 2)
- Pete Teo as Sylvester "Silver" DaCosta (season 2)
- Zahim Albakri as Peter Harris (season 2)
- Chew Kin Wah as Wong Ping Chuan (season 2)
- Patrick Teoh as Mr. Ong (season 2)
- Radhi Khalid as Datuk Rahman Samad (season 2)
- Louisa Chong as Pearl Yong (season 2)
- Bobby Kiran as Mona (season 2)

== Series overview ==
Series	Episodes	Originally released		
Series	Episodes	First released	Last released	Network
1	10	26 November 2018	25 December 2018	HBO Asia; Viu
2	10	15 July 2020	13 August 2020	HBO Asia; Viu

=== Season 1 (2018) ===
No. overall	No. in series	Title	Directed by	Written by	Original release date
1	1	"Episode 1"	Lee Thean-jeen	Chi-ren Choong	26 November 2018
2	2	"Episode 2"	Lee Thean-jeen	June Tan	27 November 2018
3	3	"Episode 3"	Jason Chong	Sue Yin Goh	3 December 2018
4	4	"Episode 4"	Jason Chong	Lee Thean-jeen	4 December 2018
5	5	"Episode 5"	Jason Chong	June Tan	10 December 2018
6	6	"Episode 6"	Jason Chong	Sue Yin Goh	11 December 2018
7	7	"Episode 7"	Jason Chong	June Tan	17 December 2018
8	8	"Episode 8"	Lee Thean-jeen	Lee Thean-jeen	18 December 2018
9	9	"Episode 9"	Lee Thean-jeen	Chi-ren Choong	24 December 2018
10	10	"Episode 10"	Lee Thean-jeen	Chi-ren Choong	25 December 2018

=== Season 2 (2020) ===
No. overall	No. in series	Title	Directed by	Written by	Original release date
11	1	"Episode 1"	Lee Thean-jeen & Jason Chong	Chi-ren Choong	15 June 2020
12	2	"Episode 2"	Zahir Omar	June Tan	22 June 2020
13	3	"Episode 3"	Zahir Omar	Ifan Adriansyah Ismail	29 June 2020
14	4	"Episode 4"	Jason Chong	Alfie Palermo	6 July 2020
15	5	"Episode 5"	Jason Chong	June Tan	13 July 2020
16	6	"Episode 6"	Jason Chong	Ifan Adriansyah Ismail	20 July 2020
17	7	"Episode 7"	Zahir Omar	Chi-ren Choong	27 July 2020
18	8	"Episode 8"	Zahir Omar	June Tan	3 August 2020
19	9	"Episode 9"	Zahir Omar	Chi-ren Choong	10 August 2020
20	10	"Episode 10"	Lee Thean-jeen & Jason Chong	Chi-ren Choong	17 August 2020

== Awards ==
Year	Award	Category	Nominee(s)	Result	Ref.
2019	Asian Academy Creative Awards	Best Drama Series	The Bridge	Nominated	
2019	Asian Academy Creative Awards	Best Adaptation of an Existing Format	The Bridge	Nominated	
2020	Asian Television Awards	Best Drama Series	The Bridge	Nominated	
2020	Asian Television Awards	Best Adaptation of an Existing Format	The Bridge	Nominated	
2020	Asian Television Awards	Best Actor in a Leading Role	Bront Palarae	Nominated	
2020	Asian Television Awards	Best Actress in a Leading Role	Rebecca Lim	Nominated	
2020	Asian Television Awards	Best Actor in a Supporting Role	Wan Hanafi Su	Nominated	
2020	Asian Television Awards	Best Actor in a Supporting Role	Fikry Ibrahim	Nominated	
2020	Asian Television Awards	Best Actor in a Supporting Role	Miller Khan	Nominated	
2020	Asian Television Awards	Best Digital Fiction Programme/Series	The Bridge	Nominated	
2020	Asian Television Awards	Best Leading Male Performance - Digital	Bront Palarae	Won	
2020	Asian Television Awards	Best Leading Male Performance - Digital	Ario Bayu	Nominated	
2020	Asian Television Awards	Best Leading Female Performance - Digital	Rebecca Lim	Nominated	
2020	Asian Academy Creative Awards	Best Drama Series	The Bridge	Nominated	
2020	Asian Academy Creative Awards	Best Actor in a Leading Role	Bront Palarae	Nominated	
2020	Asian Academy Creative Awards	Best Actress in a Leading Role	Rebecca Lim	Nominated	
2020	Asian Academy Creative Awards	Best Actor in a Supporting Role	Miller Khan	Won	
2020	Asian Academy Creative Awards	Best Actress in a Supporting Role	Aida Aris	Nominated	
2020	Asian Academy Creative Awards	Best Adaptation of an Existing Format	The Bridge	Nominated	
2020	Asian Academy Creative Awards	Best Original Screenplay	Chi-ren Choong	Nominated	
2020	Asian Academy Creative Awards	Best Sound	Steven Yap Wei Ven, Chak Mun Yee and Ahmad Fadzil	Nominated	
2020	ContentAsia Awards	Best Asian Drama for a Regional/International Market	The Bridge	Nominated	
2020	ContentAsia Awards	Best TV Format Adaptation (Scripted) in Asia	The Bridge	Nominated	
2020	ContentAsia Awards	Best Director of a Scripted TV Programme	Lee Thean-jeen	Nominated	
2020	ContentAsia Awards	Best Male Lead in a TV Programme	Bront Palarae	Nominated	

== See also ==
- The Bridge (2011 TV series)
- The Bridge (2013 TV series)
- The Tunnel (TV series)
