= A War Diary =

- Genre: Period drama
- Starring: Tay Ping Hui; James Taenaka; Winston Chao; Tan Kheng Hua; Fiona Xie; Carole Lin
- Country of origin: Singapore
- Original language: English
- No. of episodes: 20

Production
- Executive producer: Kenneth Liang
- Producer: Jenny Lim
- Production location: Singapore
- Running time: 46 minutes per episode
- Production company: Dream Forest Production

Original release
- Network: MediaCorp Channel 5
- Release: 15 August 2001

Related
- The Price of Peace (1997); In Pursuit of Peace (2001)

A War Diary is a 2001 Singaporean television series produced by Dream Forest Production. Set in the time of World War II, the series depicts the Battle of Singapore and life in Japanese-occupied Singapore from the point of view of an ethnic Chinese family. The dialogue, however, is primarily in English as the series was aired on the English-language television channel MediaCorp Channel 5. The series was nominated for four Asian Television Awards in 2002, including Best Drama Series.

== Cast ==
- Tay Ping Hui as Lim Teck Meng
- Don Lim as Lim Teck Hock
- James Taenaka as Lieutenant Kinoshita Kenji
- Winston Chao as the resistance leader
- Tan Kheng Hua as Lim Swee Neo
- Fiona Xie as Rita Lim
- Carole Lin as Bee Lian
- Valentine Cawley as Stanley Warren
- Keagan Kang as Simon DeSouza
- Tracy Tan as Susan
- Aaron Aziz
- Robin Leong
- Samuel He
- Lim Yu Beng
- Tony Quek
- Jomar Staverløkk
