= Fang Rong (actress) =

Singaporean actress (born 1996)

- Born: Foo Fang Rong; 30 May 1996 (age 30); Singapore
- Other name: Fu Fangrong
- Education: Rosyth School; Methodist Girls' School; University at Buffalo (via Singapore Institute of Management)
- Occupations: Actress; singer; model
- Years active: 2003–present
- Modeling information
- Height: 1.68 m (5 ft 6 in)

Stage name
- Chinese: 芳榕
- Hanyu Pinyin: Fāng Róng

Birth name
- Chinese: 符芳榕
- Hanyu Pinyin: Fú Fāngróng

Fang Rong (born Foo Fang Rong on 30 May 1996) is a Singaporean actress.

== Early life and career ==
Foo has an older brother and sister. She began modelling and appearing in commercials when she was four. At age 7, Foo made her debut as a child actress in the community film Coming Home (2003). She has since appeared in more than 30 local films and Mediacorp productions, both in English and Mandarin. Foo attended Rosyth School and Methodist Girls’ School. She left St Andrew's Junior College in 2015 before completing her studies, due to juggling filming commitments and having to lead the school's dance team for the Singapore Youth Festival at the same time. Foo subsequently entered the University at Buffalo via Singapore Institute of Management with her ‘O’ level scores. She became a full-time Mediacorp actress after graduating the college with a psychology degree.

== Personal life ==
Foo sings and plays the guitar. She has shared song covers on music streaming platform SoundCloud. She was also formerly the lead singer of a band called Motherfuñkers.

Foo practices Brazilian jiu-jitsu. In an interview in September 2019, Foo revealed that she lives with her boyfriend and a dog.

== Filmography ==
Foo has appeared in the following programmes and films:

=== Television series ===
Year	Title	Role	Notes	Ref.
2004	One Day She Became An Angel			
2005	Shooting Stars	Daphne's Sister		
2005	My Sassy Neighbor	Ella		
2006	Magic Garden			
2006	Money Meg			
2006	Maggi & Me			
2006	Skin Deep			
2007	Parental Guidance	Jocelyn Seto		
2007	Schoolhouse Rockz	Dawn		
2007	The Greatest Love of All	Kai Xin		
2008	Parental Guidance 2	Jocelyn Seto		
2008	Schoolhouse Rockz 2	Dawn		
2008	Perfect Cut	Kelly (teen)		
2008	Sense of Home	Stella		
2009	My School Daze	Tan Yixin		
2010	The Illusionist	Student A		
2010	The Pupil	Adele Goh		
2011	The Pupil 2	Adele Goh		
2012	Jump!	Zhuang Meixin		
2012	It Takes Two	Niu Xinhui		
2012	In Cold Blood	Stephanie		
2013	Marry Me	Young Xi Xi		
2013	I'm in Charge	Wang Jie Min		
2014	Yes We Can!	Wang Huixin		
2014	118	Liu Mei Mei (teen)		
2015	Second Chance	Wang Bai He		
2016	Ponteng School	Chloe	TV Movie	
2016	The Hush	Clara		
2016	Fine Tune			
2016	The Truth Seekers	Julie Zhou Jiayi		
2017	The Lead	Yao Yao		
2017	Faculty	Oh Si En		
2017	My Teacher Is a Thug	Li Li Jun (teen)		
2017	Dear DJ	Samantha Guo Shi Min		
2018	Dance with Me	Tricia		
2018	Reach for the Skies	Zhang Xiaochun		
2019	I'm Madam!	Han Xiaoxin		
2019	Fried Rice Paradise	Choo Bee Lean		
2019	Dear Neighbours	Blossom		
2020	Recipe of Life	Fang Shiyu		
2020	My Guardian Angels	Jelyn Xie		
2021	In Safe Hands	Zhang Shumin		
2021	Truths About Us	Claire		
2021	The Heartland Hero		Guest	
2021	Ink at Tai Ping			
2022	The Unbreakable Bond	LeAnn		
2022	Love At First Bite	Belle		
2023	Silent Walls	Chen Xiu Ya		
2023	Last Madame: Sisters of the Night	Qing Ling (young Fung Lan)		
2023	My One and Only	Xiao Jinging		

=== Web series ===
Year	Title	Role	Notes	Ref.
2018	My Agent Is A Hero	Xiao Ting		
2020	Fresh Takes Series 2		Episode: "Miss Haven't"	
2021	Why? Victor			
2021	321 Action!			
2022	I'm Actor Ah De			

=== Film ===
Year	Title	Role	Notes	Ref.
2003	Coming Home		Main cast	
2006	One Last Dance	Child III		
2006	Ah Ma	Youngest granddaughter	Short film	
2006	Love Under the Sign of the Dragon	Lan	Telemovie	
2008	Money No Enough 2	Yang Baohui's second daughter		
2009	Where Got Ghost?			
2010	Paper Boxes	Sabrina	Short film	
2013	Love...and Other Bad Habits	Nikki		
2013	Taxi! Taxi!			
2017	Wonder Boy	Louise		

=== Variety show ===
- Fashion Refabbed (2022; episode 5)

== Discography ==
=== Singles ===
Year	Song title	Notes	Ref
2022	"Hu Tai Ge Lai Bai Nian"	Mediacorp LNY Album 2022	
2023	"Ha Pi Tu He Chun Feng Sai Pao"	Mediacorp LNY Album 2023	
2023	"You Exist Everywhere"	My One and Only soundtrack	

== Awards and nominations ==
Year	Ceremony	Category	Nominated work	Result	Ref.
2007	Star Awards	Young Talent Award	The Greatest Love of All	Nominated	
2019	1st Asia Contents Awards	Best Rising Star	Faculty	Won	
2023	Star Awards	Top 10 Most Popular Female Artistes	—N/a	Nominated	
2023	Star Awards	Bioskin Most Charismatic Artiste	—N/a	Nominated	
2024	Star Awards	Top 10 Most Popular Female Artistes	—N/a	Nominated	
