= Jimmy Taenaka =

American actor

Jimmy T
- Born: James Katsuyuki Taenaka; November 27, 1964 (age 61); Fort Ord, California, US
- Occupation: Actor
- Years active: 1987–present
- Spouse: Lim Li Li (2005–present)

James Katsuyuki Taenaka (妙中克之 Taenaka Katsuyuki; born November 27, 1964), better known as Jimmy T, is a Singapore-based American film and television actor. He starred opposite the late Brandon Lee in Showdown in Little Tokyo (1991) as well as David Carradine and Daryl Hannah in Kung Fu Killer (2008).

== Early life ==
Taenaka was born in Fort Ord, California and raised in Monterey, California. His parents had immigrated from Osaka, Japan. He attended Monterey High School in Monterey, California. Taenaka was a USA Junior National Judo Champion, and represented California at USA Junior National Wrestling Championships.

== Career ==
Taenaka appears on television and film both in Asia and the United States. In Singapore, he starred in the epic World War II television drama A War Diary about the Japanese occupation of Singapore, where he also received a nomination at the Asian Television Awards in 2002 for Best Drama Performance by an Actor.

== Personal life ==
Taenaka is married to Lim Li Li. He is also involved as the VP and coach of the Wrestling Federation of Singapore.

== Filmography ==
=== Film ===
Year	Title	Studio
1991	Showdown in Little Tokyo	Warner Brothers
1993	American Yazuka	
1994	The Shadow	Universal Pictures
1995	The Low Life	
1997	Psycho Sushi	
1998	Looking Italian	
2001	Fatal Blade	
2002	Tequila – the Movie	
2004	The Second Singapore Short Story	
2005	L'Empire du Tigre	TF1
2008	Dance of the Dragon	
2008	Ovunque Tu Sia	RAI International
2010	Tiger Team: The Mountain of the 1000 Dragons	Sony Pictures
2012	Dead Mine	HBO Asia
2014	Banting	
2014	Filial Party	

=== Television ===
Year	Title	Studio	Notes
1993	Cop Files	Fox TV	
1997	JAG	CBS	
1998	Brooklyn South	CBS	
1999	Martial Law	CBS	
2000	Making Love	MediaCorp TV	
2001	A War Diary	MediaCorp TV	
2002	One Peep Too Many		TV movie
2003	Amnesia	MediaCorp TV	TV movie
2004	Rouge	MTV Asia	
2004	Singapore Shakes		TV movie
2004	Like My Own	MediaCorp TV	
2004	Machine		TV movie
2004	Daddy's Girls	MediaCorp TV	
2004	The Second Singapore Short Story	MediaCorp TV	
2005	Shooting Stars	MediaCorp TV	
2005	First Mums	MediaCorp TV	
2008	En Bloc	MediaCorp TV	
2008	Calefare	MediaCorp TV	Guest star
2008	Kung Fu Killer	RHI Entertainment	TV miniseries
2010	The Pupil	MediaCorp TV	
2017	BRA	MediaCorp TV	
2017	Silo	meWATCH	meWATCH Original
2017	Halfworlds	HBO Asia	Season 2 (guest star)
2018	Grisse	HBO Asia	
2021	Glória	Netflix	Netflix Original

=== Hosting ===
- Get Drunk in China (2007) Channel News Asia TV Series
