= Vernetta Lopez =

Singaporean actress and radio DJ

- Born: 22 July 1973 (age 53); Singapore
- Education: Ngee Ann Polytechnic; Singapore Institute of Management
- Occupations: Actress, radio presenter
- Spouses: Mark Richmond (m. 1998; div. 2005) Wayne Gladwin (m. 2009)
- Website: www.vernettalopez.com

Vernetta Lopez (born 22 July 1973) is a Singaporean actress and radio DJ. She is best known for her role as Denise Tan in the popular and award-winning Singaporean local sitcom Under One Roof from 1995 to 2003.

== Career ==
Other than being a radio DJ, actress, voice-over artiste, and emcee, Lopez is also a wedding planner and former president of "One Singapore".

=== Acting ===
Lopez's actual first television appearance was for a music television program called NiteRage, where from five hosts, it was streamlined to just two; Vernetta Lopez and Bernard Lim. Starring in Singapore's first English family sitcom known as Under One Roof shot Lopez to stardom and the sitcom ran from 1995 to 2003. Playing Denise Tan, the sitcom hit record breaking ratings and started Vernetta on her acting career professionally. Since then, she has starred in various productions and has taken on roles ranging from daughters to mothers, and from doctors to mental patients.

She also played the role of a Gynaecologist, Dr Kelly Chan, alongside Amy Cheng and Edmund Chen, in a Singapore medical drama First Touch, where it explored her personal life and her work life, which contradicted each other. In later years, she was cast in the legal drama series The Pupil and Code of Law as Deputy Public Prosecutor Vivian Lau, alongside Carmen Soo.

She has starred in other television sitcoms like, Can I Help You, Mind Your Language, Shiver, Random Acts, Big Day Out, and Okto Channel's Zero Hero, playing Lady Magnificent alongside Timothy Nga.

She has also starred in Hansel and Gretel by Wild Rice Productions.

Lopez has also starred in Rain Tree Production's local English film, The Leap Years, alongside Wong Li-Lin, Nadya Hutagalung, and Paula Malai Ali. She also made cameo appearances in local feature film City Sharks in 2003 and as a woman at the turnstile in the 2015 Hollywood sci-fi film Equals.

=== Radio DJ ===
Lopez has worked as a radio DJ since 1994. She worked first as a DJ on NTUC Radio Heart 91.3 (now One FM 91.3), before moving on to Perfect Ten 987FM, Class 95FM, and to the Breakfast Show with Mark Van Cuylenberg on Gold 90.5. Having won several Favorite Radio DJ over several years, Lopez hosts the weekday morning show from 6am to 10am with Mike Kasem on Live with Mike & Vernetta on Gold 90.5. In 2025, she announced her departure from Gold 905 after 30 years of being on the air, her last day being on May 11, 2025.

== Personal life ==
In 1998, Lopez married fellow radio DJ Mark Richmond. The couple divorced in 2005.

Lopez then married British software engineer Wayne Gladwin on 25 July 2009.

Lopez is of Portuguese and Thai ancestry on her father's side and Peranakan ancestry on her mother's side.

She majors in Radio and Television in Mass Communication studies earning a Bachelor of Arts Degree in Mass Communication.

== Filmography ==
=== Film ===
Year	Title	Role	Notes
2003	City Sharks	Bag lady and voice of Divine	
2006	The Race Begins		Voice
2008	The Leap Years	Jennie	
2015	Equals	Woman at turnstile	
2015	The Singaporean	Herself	Short film

=== Television ===
Year	Title	Role	Notes
1995-2003	Under One Roof	Denise Tan	
1996	Can I Help You?	Donna Mah	
2002	Ceciliation	Cecilia	Film
2002	First Touch	Dr. Kelly Chan	
2002	Oh Carol!	Vivian Chong	
2006	Stories of Love: The Anthology Series	Marilyn Lee	Film
2006-2008	Maggi & Me		
2007	Random Acts	Various	
2009	Cosmo & George (season 2)	Amanda Wee	
2011	Zero Hero	Mimi Wong / Lady Magnificent	
2011	The Pupil	DPP Vivian Lau	
2012-2020	Code of Law	DPP Vivian Lau	
2016	Run Rachael Run	Genevieve Phua	
2016	Rojak	Kit	
2016	Fine Tune	Lisa Wong	
2018	Fam	Joy	
2020	Le Prawn Park	Bee Bee	
2026	Aunty Lee's Deadly Delights	Rosie "Aunty" Lee	

== Awards and nominations ==
Lopez won her first Asian Television Awards in 2000 for her role in Under One Roof as Denise Tan with the award for Best Performance by an Actress (Comedy) and her second ATV award in 2003 for drama with the award for Best Performance by an Actress (Drama) for her role in Ceciliation.

At the 2016 Asian Television Awards, Lopez was nominated twice in the same category (Best Comedy Performance by an Actor/Actress) for her roles in Run Rachael Run and Rojak. Although she did not win the ATV in 2016 she did receive the accolade of 'Highly Commended' for her role in Run Rachael Run.
