= Oh Carol! =

Singaporean television sitcom

- Created by: Ng Say Yong; Ngin Chiang Meng; Emida Natalaray
- Starring: Carol Cheng; Vernetta Lopez (2003-2004); Kumar; Adelina Ong; Darren Seah; Terence Cao; Utt Panichkul; Natalie Faye; Karen Lim(2002)
- Country of origin: Singapore
- No. of seasons: 2
- No. of episodes: 26

Production
- Running time: 21-22 min (per episode)

Original release
- Network: MediaCorp TV Channel 5
- Release: August 6, 2002 – March 23, 2004

Oh Carol! is a Singaporean sitcom produced by local TV station Mediacorp. It aired on Tuesdays 8.30pm (Season 1) and on Wednesdays 8.30pm (Season 2).

== Cast ==
- Carol Cheng as Carol Chong
- Karen Lim as Mrs Chong (2002)
- Vernetta Lopez as Vivian Chong (2003-2004)
- Kumar as Sam
- Adelina Ong as Wendy
- Darren Seah as Jack Chong
- Terence Cao as Henry Toh
- Natalie Faye as Fiona
- Utt Panichkul as Alan
