= Everybody's Business (2013 film) =

2013 Singaporean film

- Theatrical release poster
- Directed by: Lee Thean-jeen
- Screenplay by: Lee Thean-jeen; Jack Neo; Boris Boo; Ng King Kang
- Story by: Jack Neo; Lee Thean-jeen; Ng King Kang
- Produced by: Pui Yin Chan; Yan Yan Chan; Yok Wai Leonard Lai; Saw Yam Seah; Soo Wei Toong
- Starring: Gurmit Singh; Mark Lee; Liu Lingling; Wang Lei; Kumar
- Cinematography: Joel San Juan
- Edited by: Lawrence Ang; Natalie Soh
- Distributed by: Clover Films; Scorpio East Pictures; Golden Village Pictures
- Release date: 5 December 2013
- Running time: 91 minutes
- Country: Singapore
- Languages: English; Mandarin; Hokkien
- Budget: $1.2 million
- Box office: $730,000

Everybody's Business (Chinese: 人人有份), is a 2013 Singaporean comedy film directed by Lee Thean-jeen. The film centres around public hygiene and cleanliness in toilets. This film also marks the third on-screen pairing of Gurmit Singh and Mark Lee after One Leg Kicking and Taxi! Taxi!, where the former was released on 14 November 2001 and the latter was released earlier on 3 January 2013.

== Plot ==
John Lu is a hygiene officer for the newly created Minister of Toilets, headed by Kumari Kuppusamy. He and his boss Winston Li need to get to the bottom of a toilet hygiene problem that has caused 50 Singaporeans to get food poisoning.

== Cast ==
- Gurmit Singh as John Lu
- Mark Lee as Winston Li
- Liu Lingling as Mrs. Wong
- Wang Lei as Mr. Wong
- Kumar as Kumari Kuppusamy
- Yeo Thiam Hock as Man at coffeeshop
- Marcus Chin as Taxi driver
- Zhang Xinxiang as Man at coffeeshop
- Henry Thia as Ah Gu
- Dawn Tam as Ah Gu's wife
- Aloysius Pang as Lu Chong Meng
- Judee Tan as John's wife
- Zhang Wei as John's grandpa
- Michelle Tay as Ministry of Toilets staff
- Ho Ai Ling as Miss Xian
- JianHao Tan as Eddy
- Joy Yak as Chinese journalist
- Yoo Ah Min as Toilet special force
- Silver Ang as Travel star staff member

=== Special appearances ===
- Chua Enlai as DD Chua
- Dennis Chew as Mr Tay
- Ya Hui as Bai Zhenzhen/Chinese/Mandarin music video artiste
- Sylvester Sim as English music video artiste
- Nadiah M. Din as Malay music video artiste / Toilet announcement in English and Malay (voice)
- Flow (Prasad Wadarajan) as Indian/Tamil music video artiste
- Anna Lin Ruping as Toilet special force
- Chua Jin Sen (Dr. Jia Jia) and Chua Jin Chou (Big Bro) as Internet video artistes
- Richard Low as New Minister of Restrooms
- Jack Neo as Man in Toilet / Toilet announcement in Chinese (voice)

== Release ==
The film was released in theatres on 5 December 2013.

== Reception ==
Charlene Chua of The New Paper gave the film three stars out of five. Yip Wai Yee of The Straits Times gave the film one and a half stars out of five, stating, "There are the rare moments when the film makes some keen observations about government campaigns, including how they always seem to incorporate a catchy ditty that everyone loves to hate, but such moments are few and far between."
