= Dead Mine =

2012 Indonesian horror film

- Film poster
- Directed by: Steven Sheil
- Written by: Ziad Semaan; Steven Sheil
- Produced by: Mike Wiluan; Nick North; Daniel Davila; Catherine Davila
- Starring: Ario Bayu; Joe Taslim; Mike Lewis; Jaitov Tigor; Miki Mizuno; Sam Hazeldine; Les Loveday; Carmen Soo; James Taenaka
- Cinematography: John Radel
- Edited by: Azhar Ismon
- Music by: Charlie Mole
- Production company: Infinite Frameworks
- Distributed by: HBO Asia
- Release dates: September 27, 2012 (Singapore); January 3, 2013
- Running time: 87 minutes
- Country: Indonesia
- Language: English

Dead Mine is a 2012 English-language Indonesian horror film directed by Steven Sheil and starring Ario Bayu and Joe Taslim. The film was produced by Infinite Frameworks, the production house before working on the musical animated film Meraih Mimpi in 2009. Filming and production of the film was done in the filming facility integrated in Batam Island.

== Plot ==
The film opens with pirates relaxing after a successful raid. One wanders into a cave and falls through a concealed hole into a hidden tunnel network.

Warren Price (Les Loveday), the son of a millionaire, travels to the island of Una-Una, Gulf of Tomini, Sulawesi, to explore a former Japanese military bunker with Japanese scientist Rie (Miki Mizuno) and his girlfriend Su-Ling (Carmen Soo). They are escorted by mercenaries Captain Tino Prawa (Ario Bayu), Djoko (Joe Taslim), Ario (Mike Lewis), and Sergeant Papa Snake (Jaitov Tigor), alongside former military engineer Stanley (Sam Hazeldine).

At a former Dutch mine seized by the Japanese in 1942 and converted into a bunker, the group is ambushed by pirates and forced underground when a grenade wounds Ario and causes a collapse. Unable to call for help, they search for another exit. Price reveals that he is also seeking Yamashita's gold, having worked with Rie to decode messages discovered at a similar bunker by an expedition led by his father's company.

Deeper inside, the bunker suddenly comes to life, displaying a Rising Sun Japanese war flag and broadcasting propaganda music. The group finds Hazmat suits, maps and disturbing photographs, while mysterious figures in protective clothing stalk them. Rie determines that the bunker was a chemical and biological weapons facility based on Unit 731, where Japanese scientists experimented on prisoners of war.

The group splits up. Prawa, Papa Snake, Price and Su-Ling search for an exit and the gold, while Djoko, Stanley and Rie remain with Ario. Ario is attacked and killed by a monstrous creature. Djoko discovers a chamber containing human remains, including the mutilated pirate from the film's opening, but is overwhelmed and killed by the creatures.

Stanley and Rie are captured by a Japanese soldier in a gas mask who refuses to accept that the war has ended. After Stanley disarms him, Rie shows him footage of the Japanese surrender aboard the USS Missouri on her iPad, causing him to break down. He explains that a gas developed by Unit 731 drove prisoners insane and mutated them into monsters, while he and other soldiers were similarly transformed as part of an attempt to create “super soldiers”.

A creature attacks Prawa's group, stabbing Price before Papa Snake kills it. Price learns that Yamashita's gold was used in the mutagenic formulas injected into the prisoners. Hoping to profit from the formulas as biological weapons, he and Su-Ling secretly take a sample. Prawa and Papa Snake discover a shrine containing numerous mutated soldiers wearing samurai armour, members of the Japanese Imperial Guard. Papa Snake sacrifices himself to hold them back.

Prawa, Price and Su-Ling encounter Djoko's corpse and fight off more creatures before reuniting with Stanley and Rie. Price is badly wounded, so Su-Ling injects him with the stolen formula. The Imperial Guardsmen kill the Japanese soldier and pursue the survivors, who are then attacked by mutated former POWs allied with the Guards. Su-Ling abandons the others with Price, while Prawa makes a heroic last stand to allow Rie and Stanley to escape.

Su-Ling drags Price to the cave entrance, but the formula has driven him insane and he kills her. Rie and Stanley escape through an underwater tunnel, but the Guardsmen pursue them. Only Rie reaches the surface, where she is surrounded by more Guardsmen emerging from the lake. As one swings his sword at her, the film ends, implying that she is killed.

== Cast ==
- Ario Bayu as Captain Tino Prawa, Team of Five Captain
- Sam Hazeldine as Stanley
- Joe Taslim as Djoko
- Jaitov Tigor as Sergeant Papa Snake
- Mike Lewis as Ario
- Miki Mizuno as Rie
- Les Loveday as Warren Prince
- Carmen Soo as Su-Ling
- Jimmy Taenaka as Ryuichi

== Home media ==
The film was released on DVD on May 28, 2013.
