= Parental Guidance (Singaporean TV series) =

- Intertitle screen
- Developed by: PicsTalk
- Starring: Adrian Pang; Jessica Hester Hsuan
- Country of origin: Singapore
- No. of episodes: 26

Production
- Executive producers: Pauline Yu; Tan Wei-Lyn; Joanne Teo
- Producer: PicsTalk
- Running time: 30 minutes (with commercials)

Original release
- Network: MediaCorp
- Release: February 8, 2007 – August 12, 2008

Parental Guidance (Chinese: 奉子成婚) is a Singaporean drama produced by local TV station MediaCorp and airs on MediaCorp Channel 5 on Thursdays at 8.30pm starting on 8 February 2007 to 3 May 2007 for a total of 13 episodes.

== Cast ==
Actor	Character	Season(s)
Adrian Pang	James Seto	1–2
Jessica Hsuan	Ling Toh	1-2
Fang Rong	Jocelyn Seto	1-2
Kyle Chan	Jonathan Seto	1
Bryan Chung	Jonathan Seto	2
Jessica Cuipa	Jolene Seto	1-2
Chua Enlai	Al	1-2
Jason Chan	Terence	1-2
Pam Oei	Mathilda Gong	1-2
Kenneth Tsang	Patrick Seto	1-2
Lok Meng Chue	Cecilia Seto	1-2
Rosalind Pho	Cherry	1-2
Gurmit Singh	Micheal	2
Lim Kay Tong	Colonel	2

== Episodes ==
=== Season 1 ===
#	Airdate	Title
1	8 February 2007	Getting Married
2	15 February 2007	Moving In
3	22 February 2007	The Maid
4	1 March 2007	Bringing Up Children
5	8 March 2007	Christmas
6	15 March 2007	School
7	22 March 2007	Kutu
8	29 March 2007	Family Day
9	5 April 2007	Mum's Back
10	12 April 2007	Imperfect Couple
11	19 April 2007	The Post Marital Affair
12	26 April 2007	Bachelor Party Plans
13	3 May 2007	To Be Single Again

=== Season 2 ===
#	Airdate	Title
1	20 May 2008	Episode #2.1
2	27 May 2008	Episode #2.2
3	3 June 2008	Moving On
4	10 June 2008	The Superior Parent
5	17 June 2008	The Colonel
6	24 June 2008	Double Happiness
7	1 July 2008	Family Ties
8	8 July 2008	Good Old Days
9	15 July 2008	For Richer or Poorer
10	22 July 2008	Going Nowhere Together
11	29 July 2008	Romantic Date
12	5 August 2008	Let Fate Decide
13	12 August 2008	Happily Ever After?
