= Love ... and Other Bad Habits =

2013 Singaporean film

- Theatrical release poster
- Traditional Chinese: 玩味愛情
- Simplified Chinese: 玩味爱情
- Literal meaning: "Contemplating love" / "Love is bewildering"
- Hanyu Pinyin: Wànwèi àiqíng
- Directed by: Lee Thean-jeen
- Written by: Lee Thean-jeen
- Produced by: Li Huanwen
- Starring: Zoe Tay; Chen Hanwei; George Young; Carmen Soo; Ian Fang; Kimberly Chia; Kym Ng
- Cinematography: Liu Long Fei
- Edited by: Ying Siew Kei
- Production company: Weiyu Films
- Distributed by: Cathay-Keris Films
- Release date: 14 February 2013
- Running time: 81 minutes
- Country: Singapore
- Languages: English; Mandarin

Love ... and Other Bad Habits (Chinese: 玩味爱情) is a 2013 Singaporean romantic drama film directed by Lee Thean-jeen. It is Singapore’s first telemovie to be shown in cinemas and the first local theatrically released film to have an alternative ending screened at different locations. Distributed by Cathay-Keris Films, the film stars Zoe Tay, Chen Hanwei, George Young, Carmen Soo, Ian Fang, Kimberly Chia and Kym Ng.

== Cast ==
- Zoe Tay as Mei
- Chen Hanwei as Chin Wei
- George Young as Mike
- Carmen Soo as Jess
- Ian Fang as Darrell
- Kimberly Chia as Ann
- Kym Ng as Suzy
- Irene Ang as Mrs Cheng Cheng
- Tan Shou Chen as JJ
- Malèna Tornatore as May
- Andrew Lua as Damian
- Sivakumar Palakrishnan as Mr. Rosario
- Henry Heng as Mr. Hee
- Fang Rong as Nikki
- Gillian Tan as Leona
- Leron Heng as Emily
- Elias Tiong as Kiat
- Gabriel Lee as Xavier
- Ashley Leong as Jonathan

== Release ==
First released as a telemovie on streaming site Toggle, the film had its theatrical release on 14 February 2013, with version A ending shown at Cineleisure Orchard, Causeway Point, Downtown East and version B ending screened at AMK Hub and West Mall Cathay Cineplexes.
