= Maggi & Me =

Singapore television comedy series

- Maggi & Me title screen
- Created by: Stella Wee
- Developed by: TBA
- Directed by: Ian Seymour
- Starring: Fiona Xie; Adrian Pang
- Country of origin: Singapore
- No. of episodes: 26

Production
- Executive producer: Daisy Irani
- Running time: 30 minutes (with commercials)

Original release
- Network: Mediacorp Channel 5
- Release: 25 July 2006 – 12 February 2008

Maggi & Me (Chinese: 我爱鬼妹) is a Singaporean fantasy situation comedy that airs on Mediacorp Channel 5. The English-language series debuted 25 July 2006 and stars Fiona Xie and Adrian Pang in the title roles. The series wrapped up its season 1 finale on 17 October 2006 and the season 2 finale on 12 February 2008. The series title is a play on Maggimee, the nickname for Maggi's noodle products.

== Synopsis ==
Maggi & Me chronicles the misadventures of a Singaporean scam artist, Johnny Tan (Pang), who, during a phony scene that he set up to scam a couple of old women, accidentally befriends the ghost of a deceased bride (Xie), who under unexplained circumstances, might have been killed on her wedding night. The series' setting is similar to that of the 2005 American film Just Like Heaven. This unusual pairing finds themselves working together in unlikely situations, along the lines of Ghostbusters and Ghost Whisperer, with a little Psych and Jennifer Slept Here thrown in for good measure.

Because he is the only one that can see her, Johnny has to keep his sanity because the spirit in question is also suffering from spectral amnesia: It appears that she doesn't remember anything about how she died or her mortal life, except for the letter M that she has on her necklace (the reason is that her name, Emily and her nickname, Em, which is why he decided to name her "Maggi" after the food products of the same name, which also happens to be his brand of cup noodles that he constantly eats). With that mystery surrounding her death, Johnny also believes that he can put together the pieces of her puzzle and find out the truth about his spirited partner so her soul can finally rest in peace, even though Maggi is hoping for a chance at being reincarnated.

== Characters ==
Cast	Role
Abigail Chay	Chin Chin
Koh Chieng Mun	Emily/Maggi's mother, Jenny Ban
Kumar	Menatchi
Moses Lim	Henry
Subin Subiah	TBA
Suhaimi Yusof	Sgt Dollah Abu Bakar
Vernetta Lopez	TBA
Chua En Lai	Tanaka
Andrea Fonseka	Sherry

== Episodes ==
Episode Guide & Synopsis at MOBTV Season 1

- 1. (25 July 2006)
- 2. Crying Girl(1 August 2006)
- 3. Baby(8 August 2006)
- 4. Martin(15 August 2006)
- 5. Roland(22 August 2006)
- 6. Henry(29 August 2006)
- 7. Ah Pok(5 September 2006)
- 8. Rajoo (12 September 2006)
- 9. Menatchi (19 September 2006)
- 10. Tanaka & Jones (26 September 2006)
- 11. Jenny Ban (3 October 2006)
- 12. Emily (Part 1) (10 October 2006)
- 13. Emily (Part 2) (17 October 2006)

Episode Guide & Synopsis at MOBTV Season 2

- 1. Mabel Poon (Part 1)(6 November 2007)
- 2. Mabel Poon (Part 2)(13 November 2007)
- 3. Collin Pocket (20 November 2007)
- 4. George (27 November 2007)
- 5. Aunty Lu (4 December 2007)
- 6. Alex (Part 1) (18 December 2007)
- 7. Alex (Part 2) (1 January 2008)
- 8. Molly (8 January 2008)
- 9. Flora (15 January 2008)
- 10. Ben Ben (22 January 2008)
- 11. Mona (29 January 2008)
- 12. Bebe (5 February 2008)
- 13. Hector (12 February 2008)

== Broadcasters ==
Country	TV Network(s)	Series Premiere	Weekly Schedule
Singapore	MediaCorp TV Channel 5	25 July 2006	Tuesday 8pm GMT
United States	TBA	2007	TBA
Malaysia	ntv7	2006	Sunday 9.30 pm, later aired on Friday at 7.00 pm

== Syndication ==
In 2009, Galloping Films, an Australian-based television and film distribution company, acquired the international rights to MediaCorp-produced programs, including Maggi & Me, for syndication outside of Singapore
