= Kung Fu Killer =

- Written by: Jacqueline Feather; John Mandel
- Directed by: Philip Spink
- Starring: David Carradine; Daryl Hannah; Osric Chau; Jimmy Taenaka; Lim Yu-Beng
- Theme music composer: Jim Guttridge
- Country of origin: United States
- Original language: English/Chinese

Production
- Editor: Mike Banas

Original release
- Network: Spike TV
- Release: 2008

Kung Fu Killer is a 2008 two-part miniseries that aired on Spike TV. The miniseries features many eastern Kung Fu talents including Osric Chau. The miniseries alludes to the "Kung Fu" programs of the 1970s that brought David Carradine to fame.

The film was completely shot in China.

== Reception ==
The Kung Fu action site 24 Frames per Second gave the film a poor review, criticizing the script, the "coma inducing" David Carradine, as well as Daryl Hannah's singing ability. Moviefone called it "a rather unfortunate tribute". Beyond Hollywood, however, praises Daryl Hannah, but criticizes the overall film as "boring".
