= Homecoming (2011 film) =

- Directed by: Lee Thean-jeen
- Written by: Thean-jeen Lee
- Produced by: Pui Yin Chan; Peggie Lim; Peggy Lim; Phillip Lim; Soo Wei Toong
- Starring: Ah Niu; Jack Neo; Mark Lee; Huang Wenhong; Rebecca Lim; Jacelyn Tay
- Cinematography: Joel San Juan
- Edited by: Yim Mun Chong
- Music by: Kavin Hoo
- Production company: Homerun Asia
- Release date: 3 February 2011
- Running time: 97 minutes
- Country: Singapore
- Languages: English; Mandarin
- Budget: $1.5 million

Homecoming (Chinese: 笑着回家), is a 2011 Singaporean and Malaysian comedy film directed by Lee Thean-jeen. It was Lee's debut feature film.

== Plot ==
Ah Meng and his mother, Karen Neo, travel to Kuala Lumpur for a Chinese New Year reunion dinner.

Newly-wed couple Boon and Jamie aim to head off to Bali right after their family's reunion dinner, which cannot begin until all of the guests arrive.

Chef Daniel Koh neglects his daughter Mindy as he prepares dishes for customers. When his fiery temper results in the resignation of several assistant chefs, he requires the help of restaurant manager Fei Fei.

== Cast ==
- Ah Niu as Ah Meng
- Jack Neo as Karen Neo
- Mark Lee as Daniel Koh
- Huang Wenhong as Boon
- Rebecca Lim as Jamie
- Koe Yeet as Mindy
- Jacelyn Tay as Fei Fei
- Afdlin Shauki as taxi driver
- Liu Lingling

== Release ==
It released in theatres in Singapore on 3 February 2011, the first day of Chinese New Year.

== Reception ==
Yong Shu Hoong of My Paper rated the film 3.5 stars out of 5, writing "Of course, a little sentimentality is inevitable in a Chinese New Year comedy. And messages about the importance of family and tradition may, at times, border dangerously on heavy-handedness. Still, the overall effect is a wholesome feel-good movie that is not only well-paced, entertaining and (as its Chinese title suggests) brimming with laughter, but also has its heart in all the right places." Dylan Tan of The Business Times rated the film B+, calling it "heartfelt, well-made and well-observed". The Straits Times rated the film 2.5 stars out of five and 3.5 stars out of five for the festive index, stating "It is hard to quibble with the well-meaning sentiments here – the importance of family and spending time with them – but writer-director Lee Thean-jeen's debut feature feels a tad heavy-handed."
