= Bring Back the Dead =

2015 film by Lee Thean-jeen

- 招魂
- Directed by: Lee Thean-jeen
- Screenplay by: Lee Thean-jeen
- Based on: Bringing Back The Dead by Wong Swee Hoon
- Produced by: Toong Soo Wei
- Starring: Jesseca Liu; Jacko Chiang; Liu Lingling; Shawn Tan; Tim Law
- Production companies: MM2 Entertainment; Weiyu Films; Clover Films
- Distributed by: Golden Village
- Release date: January 8, 2015
- Running time: 90 minutes
- Country: Singapore
- Language: Mandarin
- Box office: US$284,876

Bring Back the Dead (Chinese: 招魂) is a 2015 Singapore horror film written and directed by Lee Thean-jeen. It stars Jesseca Liu as a grieving mother who seeks to return her dead child to life through supernatural means. It was released theatrically in Singapore on January 8, 2015, and grossed US$284,876.

== Plot ==
The film opens with flashbacks showcasing Jia En (Jesseca Liu), her husband De Wei (Jacko Chiang), and their seven-year-old son, Xiao Le (Shawn Tan), enjoying family moments.

During Xiao Le's birthday celebration, De Wei gifts him a puppy. Later, De Wei leaves for work, and Jia En, experiencing a severe headache, rests while leaving Xiao Le under the care of their maid, Nora. While playing with his new puppy, Xiao Le chases it onto the road and is fatally struck by a car.

Overcome with grief after the death of her son, Jia En turns to a medium, Madam Seetoh (Liu Ling Ling), her former caregiver known for her knowledge of Taoist rituals. Madam Seetoh agrees to help Jia En perform a ritual with the help of a shaman to bring back Xiao Le's soul, cautioning her about the potential consequences.

During the ritual, a body part (specifically a finger) is required as a spiritual anchor. Madam Seetoh assures Jia En that she will “know” when Xiao Le's spirit returns.

Following this, Jia En begins to sense a presence in the house, believing her son's spirit has returned.

Initially, Jia En finds comfort in the presence of her son's spirit. However, as time passes, she begins to notice strange and unsettling occurrences in her home leading her to question the true nature of the entity she has brought back. As the supernatural events escalate, Jia En uncovers that the spirit residing in her home may not be her son.

Driven by this fear, Jia En returns to the cemetery where Xiao Le is buried and notices an unmarked grave right next to her son's. She realises that Madam Seetoh had given the shaman who had assisted her during the ritual process false directions to exhume Xiao Le's finger since his grave did not have a headstone yet.

Jia En confronts the gravekeeper, a man who is seen sweeping the graves nearby. She questions him about the unmarked grave, however he grows nervous and avoids answering. He insists it's none of her concern, brushing her off with vague replies. His evasiveness only deepens her suspicion, to which she seizes the opportunity to secretly inspect his phone. She finds Madam Seetoh's phone number among the gravekeeper's contacts.

Jia En attempts to contact the number and does not answer when Madam Seetoh picks up the call. It is revealed that Madam Seetoh has a son who had died under mysterious or violent circumstances in the past.

This revelation puts Jia En and those around her in grave danger, forcing her to confront the consequences of tampering with the supernatural.

== Cast ==
- Jesseca Liu as Jia En
- Jacko Chiang
- Liu Lingling as Madam Seetoh
- Shawn Tan as XiaoLe
- Timothy Law as Tam

== Production ==
Writer-director Lee was attracted to the original short story, which he adapted, because of its emotional depth. Lee said casting for the film was difficult, as he had trouble finding an actress in her 30s who was both comfortable with horror and playing a mother. Liu, who was cast as the mother, said the role was her "most challenging to date", as she had to play a range of emotions without having been a mother. To prepare for the emotional scenes, she thought about the loss of her cats. Liu cited a scene in which a disembodied hand fondles her as the most difficult in the film. After discussing it with Lee, he agreed to make it less intimate, and it was rewritten to involving kissing instead.

== Reception ==
Boon Chan of The Straits Times rated it 3.5/5 stars and wrote that the story always makes logical sense, avoids cheap scares, and emotionally involves viewers.
