= The Truth (2008 TV series) =

- 谜图
- Genre: Modern Thriller/Suspense
- Created by: 赵志坚
- Starring: Tay Ping Hui; Joanne Peh; Rebecca Lim; Shaun Chen; Zhu Houren; Richard Loh
- Opening theme: 谜图 by Darren Tan Sze Wei
- Country of origin: Singapore
- Original language: Chinese
- No. of episodes: 20

Production
- Producer: 林明哲
- Running time: approx. 45 minutes per episode

Original release
- Network: MediaCorp TV Channel 8
- Release: 7 April – 2 May 2008

Related
- Just in Singapore; Rhythm of Life

The Truth (Chinese: 谜图) is a Singaporean Chinese modern suspense drama which was telecasted on Singapore's free-to-air channel, MediaCorp Channel 8. It made its debut on 7 April 2008 and ended on 2 May 2008. This drama serial consists of 20 episodes, and was screened on every weekday night at 9:00 pm.

== Cast ==
=== Main cast ===
- Tay Ping Hui as Lu Zhiwei
- Joanne Peh as Chen Shuxian
- Shaun Chen as Alex Su
- Rebecca Lim as Chen Shufen
- Zhu Houren as Su Zhenyuan
- Richard Low as Lu Rongguang
- Zhu Yuye as Susan Ong

== Synopsis ==
The series main focus is a treasure map that was inherited by Su Zhenyuan from his late father. That same map is also coveted by Lu Rongguang, who was Zhenyuan's business partner.

Meanwhile, Chen Shuxian and Chen Shufen came to Singapore for career opportunities, but their mother, who came with the sisters, was murdered shortly after arrival. Through the subsequent investigation, Shuxian got to know police officer Lu Zhiwei, and Shufen began an intimate relationship with Zhenyuan's son, Alex Su.

Shuxian, meanwhile, discovered that her mother's death may be linked to Zhenyuan, and later became embroiled on Rongguang's plot to get the treasure map.
