= The Big Day (2018 film) =

- Directed by: Lee Thean-jeen
- Starring: Desmond Tan; Amber An
- Production companies: Clover Films mm2 Entertainment; Weiyu Films
- Release date: 21 June 2018
- Running time: 84 minutes
- Country: Singapore
- Language: Mandarin
- Budget: $1.5 million

The Big Day (Chinese: 简单的婚礼), initially known as A Simple Wedding, is a 2018 Singaporean romance comedy film directed by Lee Thean-jeen.

== Plot ==
An Shuyu imagnines that her wedding with Xu Nuoyan will be simple. However, their wedding is interrupted by various things, such as overbearing in-laws and a jealous best friend.

== Cast ==
- Desmond Tan as Xu Nuoyan
- Amber An as An Shuyu
- Michael Huang as Bawa
- Richard Low as Ah Guan
- Liu Lingling as Ah Mei
- Geraldine Gan as Jojo
- Hirzi Zulkiflie as Wira
- Afdlin Shauki as Inspector Rashid

== Release ==
The film released in theatres in Singapore on 21 June 2018.

== Reception ==
Liao Wanqi of zbCOMMA rated the film 3.5 stars out of 5. Ang Tian Tian of The New Paper rated the film 3 stars out of 5, praising the chemistry between the two main characters, the performance of An, and the editing style. John Lui of The Straits Times rated the film 2.5 stars out of 5, writing "To Lee's credit, there are a couple of interludes that come from character, such as ones that reveal the affection the couple have for each other. The trouble is that as characters, the couple are as sanitised and blandly likeable as tap water and all the wackiness coming from the supporting players cannot make up for the absence of texture." Chen Yunhong of Lianhe Zaobao rated the film 2.5 stars out of 5 for entertainment and 2 stars out of 5 for art. Douglas Tseng of today rated the film 2 stars out of 5.
