= Ghost Child =

- Theatrical release poster
- Directed by: Gilbert Chan
- Written by: Gilbert Chan; Tang Fong Cheng; Danny Yeo
- Screenplay by: Tan Fong Cheng; Gilbert Chan
- Produced by: Gary Goh; Eric Khoo; Tang Fong Cheng; Bert Tan (Executive Producer)
- Starring: Chen Hanwei; Jayley Woo; Carmen Soo
- Cinematography: Kevin Kee Hoe
- Edited by: Natalie Soh
- Music by: Ken Chong
- Production companies: Gorylah Pictures; Clover Films; Mm2 Entertainment
- Distributed by: Golden Village Pictures
- Release date: 7 March 2013 (Singapore)
- Running time: 88 minutes
- Country: Singapore
- Language: Chinese
- Box office: US$422,150

Ghost Child (Chinese: 鬼仔; formerly called Inside the Urn) is a 2013 Singaporean horror film directed by Gilbert Chan starring Chen Hanwei, Jayley Woo and Carmen Soo. The film revolves around a family fighting against the titular "Ghost Child" (a toyol). It was commercially released in Singapore on 7 March 2013.

== Plot ==
Having saved her from a band of Indonesian bandits, widower Choon (Chen Hanwei) announces his plans to marry Indonesian-Chinese Na (Carmen Soo). Na is mysterious in nature and says little about her background. Amongst the items she brings with her is an urn, which contains the eponymous "Ghost Child", otherwise known as a toyol. The toyol causes much distress to Choon and his estranged teenage daughter, Kim (Jayley Woo). Among other strange happenings, family photographs get torn apart and Kim's grandmother gets injured for no apparent reason. At first suspecting her dead mother's ghost for causing these, Kim soon learns about the toyol and attempts to get rid of it, but her efforts are to no avail. Could she save her family by ridding this unspeakable evil?

== Cast ==
- Chen Hanwei as Choon. A widower contractor who encounters supernatural happenings in his residence after marrying his second wife.
- Jayley Woo as Kim. Choon's teenage daughter who tries to fight against a mysterious evil force that threatens the safety of her family.
- Carmen Soo as Na. Choon's Indonesian-Chinese wife.
- Cecilia Heng as Kim's grandmother.
- Russell Ong as Troy.
- Vanessa Lee as Tifanny. Kim's schoolmate and swimming buddy.
- Elena Choo as Jane. Kim's schoolmate and member of her swim team.

== Production ==
Production commenced in September 2012.

=== Development ===
Ghost Child is Chen Hanwei's feature-length film debut; previously he only appeared in numerous Singaporean television series. Chen wanted to reject the role offered to him due to his busy schedule at first, but later agreed. According to producer Lim Teck, Chen agreed to commit to the film for "a plate of cheap [Hainanese] chicken rice", while Chen himself said it was because:

[...] I really wanted to do this film and they really wanted me for the role, so my manager just squeezed out time for it, no matter how tight it is.

Chen had also previously mentioned that he joined the project as he was "a fan of the people behind it".

== Reception ==
=== Critical response ===
Gabriel Chong of Movie Exclusive thought "[the film lacked] a character-driven narrative, this competently staged horror otherwise boasts some genuinely suspenseful and edge-of-your-seat gripping moments", giving it 3 stars. Raphael Lim, writing for F*** Mag, gave the film 2.5 stars, out of 5. "Ghost Child would have been an uncomplicated, generally effective horror yarn if not for its meandering subplots," he wrote.

=== Box office ===
The film grossed an estimated S$530,000 during its run at Singaporean cinemas.

== See also ==
- List of ghost films
