= Kahit Isang Saglit =

Filipino drama series

- Title card
- Also known as: A Time for Us
- Genre: Romance; Drama; Action drama
- Created by: ABS-CBN Studios; Henry King Quitain
- Developed by: ABS-CBN Studios; Malou N. Santos
- Directed by: Gilbert G. Perez; Jerry Lopez Sineneng
- Starring: Jericho Rosales; Carmen Soo; Albert Martinez; Cristine Reyes; Christopher de Leon
- Opening theme: "Kahit Isang Saglit" by Martin Nievera
- Countries of origin: Philippines; Malaysia
- Original languages: Filipino; Malay
- No. of episodes: 65 (Philippines total); 26 (Malaysia, Singapore total)

Production
- Executive producers: Carlo Katigbak; Cory Vidanes; Laurenti Dyogi; Malou Santos
- Production locations: Philippines; Kuala Lumpur, Malaysia
- Production companies: Star Creatives (Philippines); Double Vision (Malaysia & Singapore)

Original release
- Network: ABS-CBN (Philippines); Double Vision (Malaysia & Singapore)
- Release: September 15 – December 12, 2008

Kahit Isang Saglit (International title: A Time for Us / transl. Even for One Moment) is a Filipino drama television series produced by ABS-CBN and Double Vision. It aired in the Philippines in primetime from Monday through Friday and was aired both in Malaysia and Singapore. It aired from September 15 to December 12, 2008 replacing Pinoy Dream Academy Season 2 and was replaced by Precious Time.

The show was dedicated to its first director, Gilbert Guevarra Perez, who died in 2008. In 2009, it was nominated on the Seoul International Drama Awards and recently the series garnered a nomination for the 37th International Emmy Award for Telenovelas.

== Synopsis ==
Rocky Santillan's (Jericho Rosales) father was a policeman who was murdered. His mother sustained a fatal heart attack as she mourned her husband's lifeless body on the beach. Margaret/Garie (Carmen Soo) was very happy to see her father, Ronaldo Dimaandal (Albert Martinez), again and was excited to spend time with both her mom & dad, but she awoke the next morning to find out he had gone again. Garie and her mom then went to live with a relative who didn't think much of her dad (Garie's Grandmother and Eunice's mother).

After 15 years, Rocky has become a PDEA Agent and has gone to Malaysia for an important assignment. While there, he secretly leads an investigation into his father's death, which remains unsolved though Rocky can still remember the face of the man who visited his dad before he was murdered (Garie's dad). Meanwhile, Garie still yearns for her father. She still believes that her father left against his will and plans to go to the Philippines to look for him.

One busy day, when both of them are in a rush, they collide and fall into each other's arms.

== Cast and characters ==
=== Protagonist ===
- Jericho Rosales as Francisco 'Rocky' Santillan, Jr.
- Carmen Soo as Margaret 'Garie' Hang-Li

=== Antagonist ===
- Christopher de Leon as Dir. Gen. Anthony Mondragon

=== Main Cast ===
- Albert Martinez as Ronaldo Dimaandal
- Cristine Reyes as Alona Mondragon

=== Supporting Cast ===
- Soosan Hoh as Eunice Hang-Li
- Louisa Chong as "Popo" Jenny Hang-Li
- Malou de Guzman as Auntie Marian Santillan
- Isabel Rivas as Vivian Mondragon
- Awal Ashaari as Amir Mohammad
- Zayanah Ibrahim as Anis
- Dick Israel as Commander Matteo Padilla
- Empoy Marquez as Nestor
- Wilma Doesnt as Mona

=== Recurring Cast ===
- Neil Ryan Sese as Commander Rene Ilagan
- Nanding Josef as Serbio
- Laarni Rivera as Allona
- Beatriz Saw as Attorney Espinosa
- Zeppi Boromeo as Agent Dipong
- Marvin Raymundo as Agent Monching
- Roxanne Barcelo as Trisha

=== Guest Cast ===
- Erynne Erynna as Young Garie
- Joem Bascon as Young Ronaldo
- Rafael Rosell as Young Anthony
- Winryll Banaag as Joshua
- Lauren Novero as Edgar
- Rico Barrera as the drug dealer
- Josh Ivan Morales

=== Special Participation ===
- Nonie Buencamino as Francisco Santillan, Sr.
- Pilar Pilapil
- Shamaine Centenera-Buencamino as Mrs. Barbara Reyes
- Glenda Garcia as Elena Santillan

== Remake ==
On December 3, 2025, it has been announced that a remake of the series is in the works and will start production in mid-2026. The series will release on iWant platform as an iWant original in the Philippines and on Astro platforms as an Astro original in Malaysia.
