= Double Vision (company) =

Malaysian production studio

Double Vision Sdn Bhd
- Type: Private Limited Company
- Industry: Television
- Founded: 1985; 41 years ago
- Headquarters: Petaling Jaya, Malaysia
- Area served: Asia
- Subsidiaries: Double Vision Pictures Sdn Bhd; Vision Animation Sdn Bhd; Vision Interactive Broadband Service Sdn Bhd; New Vision Partner Sdn Bhd; Vision Media Works Sdn Bhd; Vision Innovative Media Sdn Bhd; Vision Plus Entertainment Sdn Bhd
- Website: http://www.visionnewmedia.net/

Double Vision is a Malaysian production studio. Established in 1985, it has production hubs in Malaysia and Indonesia. Double Vision produces over 1,400 hours of television programming per year in various languages and genres for the regional market. It also houses international entertainment TV network, Channel [V], in its studios.

== Filmography ==
YEAR	TITLE
2008	Ah Long Pte Ltd 老师嫁老大
2009	The Wedding Game 大喜事
2010	Sini Ada Hantu
2011	Home Coming 笑着回家
2012	Ghost Buddies 老友开心鬼
2012	Paper Moon 纸月亮
2014	Rentap

== Television series ==
YEAR	TITLE	NETWORK	GENRE
2006	Through It All 海的儿子	ntv7	Drama
2006	Trio & A Bed 三个女子一张床	ntv7	Drama
2007	Age Of Glory Season 1 情牵南苑 1	ntv7	Drama
2007	Goodnight DJ 声空感应	ntv7	Drama
2008	Exclusive Edition 独家追辑	ntv7	Drama
2008	Geng Bas Sekolah 2	Astro Ceria	Drama
2008	La Femene 绝世佳人	ntv7	Drama
2008	The Iron Lady 女头家	ntv7	Drama
2008	The Time for Us (Kahit Isang Saglit)	ABS-CBN	Drama
2008	Midnight DJ	TV5	Drama
2009	Geng Bas Sekolah 3	Astro Ceria	Drama
2009	Glowing Embers 炭乡	ntv7	Drama
2009	The Adjusters 稽查专用	ntv7	Drama
2009	Timeless Season 平底高跟鞋	ntv7	Drama
2010	Age of Glory Season 2 情牵南洋 2	ntv7	Drama
2010	Geng Bas Sekolah 4	Astro	Drama
2010	Goodnight DJ 2 声空感应 2	ntv7	Drama
2010	Mystique Valley 诡雾山城	ntv7	Drama
2011	Footprints in The Sand 足印	ntv7	Drama
2011	Forget Me Not 罪爱	ntv7	Drama
2012	Laws Of Attraction 寂寞同盟	ntv7	Drama
2012	Summer Brothers 羽过天晴	ntv7	Drama
2012	The Adjusters 2 稽查专用 2	ntv7	Drama
2012	Small Mission Enterprise Season 1 (S.M.E)	ntv7	Sitcom
2013	Double Trouble Love 我心向明月	ntv7	Telemovie
2013	Geng Bas Sekolah 5	Astro Ceria	Drama
2013	In Law 男婚女嫁	ntv7	Drama
2013	Mr.Bun 一块二的幸福	8TV	Drama
2013	Pianissimo 听风的歌	ntv7	Drama
2013	Small Mission Enterprise 2 (S.M.E 2)	ntv7	Sitcom
2013	The Liar 说谎者	ntv7	Drama
2014	Cakap Melayu Lah!	Astro Warna	Sitcom
2014	In Laws 2 男婚女嫁 2	ntv7	Drama
2014	Ryujin Juwara	TV3	Kids Show
2015	Identity Switched 分身乏术	ntv7	Drama
2015	Terms Of Endearment 如何说再见	ntv7	Drama
2015	The Injustice Stranger 我的男友不是人	ntv7	Drama
2015	Oppa?Oppa! 我的欧巴们	ntv7	Drama
2015	Family Kitchen Season 1	Asian Food Channel	Cook Show
2015	Facing up to Fazura Season 2	E!	Reality
2015	Into the Phoenix 游龙戏凤	ntv7	Drama
2016	2 Dudes & A Kitchen	TLC	Cook Show
2016	Beautiful World 1美丽新世界 1	ntv7	Drama
2016	Family Kitchen Season 2	Asian Food Channel	Cook Show
2016	I am not a loser 真心不怕输	ntv7	Drama
2016	Kutinggalkan Cinta Di Okinawa	Astro Mustika	Drama
2017	The Men in Black School 永保平安	ntv7	Drama
2017	Family Kitchen Season 3	Asian Food Channel	Cook Show
2017	Beautiful World 2 My Pet lovers 美丽新世界2 - 宠物	ntv7	Drama
2017	Martin Yan Asian Favorites Season 1	Asian Food Channel	Cook Show
2017	IAMWOMAN	Viu	Reality/Informercial
2018	Super Mischievous MIL 我的非一般岳母	ntv7	Drama
2018	Disoriental	iflix	Standup Comedy
2018	Family Kitchen Season 4	Asian Food Channel	Cook Show
2018	The Bridge 1	HBO Asia / Viu	Drama
2019	Shimmering Fireworks 那年烟火灿烂时	8TV	Drama
2019	Back to you 当时明月在	8TV	Telemovie
2019	Kopitiam Double Shot	Viu	Sitcom
2019	Loving you 爱...没有距离	Mediacorp	Drama
2020	The Bridge 2	HBO Asia / Viu	Drama
