= Fighting Spiders =

Fighting Spiders is a drama television program from Singapore that premiered on MediaCorp Channel 5 on 14 April 2009. The series stars Andie Chen, Edwin Goh and Jason Liang. The show was created by Ngin Chiang Meng and Jenny Lim. The series' second season premiered on Channel 5 on 12 August 2010. The second season was filmed using a Canon EOS 7D DSLR camera.

== Plot ==
Fighting Spiders is the story of three boys in the 1960s — Soon Lee (Edwin Goh), Charlie (Jason Liang) and Peter (Freddie Fielding) — and their adventure to find the legendary King Spider.

== Cast ==
- Andie Chen as Tony Lee
- Edwin Goh as Soon Lee
- Jason Liang as Charlie
- Freddie Fielding as Peter
- Rebecca Lim as Susie
- Ezann Lee as Annie
- Siona Wu-Murphy as Sam
- Kimberly Chia as Yi Ling
- Bobby Tonelli as Thomas Livingstone
- Ethan Hsieh as Ah Huat
- Peggy Ferroa as Amah
- Hasif Nasir as Jamal
