= Janice Koh =

Singaporean politician

- 许优美
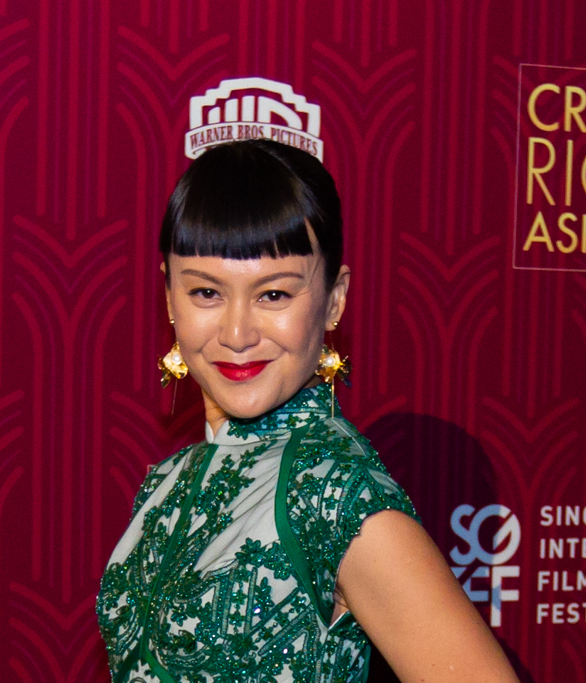
- Koh in 2018

Nominated Member of Parliament
- In office 14 February 2012 – 31 July 2014

Personal details
- Born: 10 December 1973 (age 52) Singapore
- Spouse: Lionel Yeo
- Children: 2
- Education: Goldsmiths College; National University of Singapore
- Occupation: Actress, politician
- Website: https://www.facebook.com/pages/Janice-Koh

Janice Koh
- Simplified Chinese: 许优美
Transcriptions
Standard Mandarin
- Hanyu Pinyin: Xǔ Yōuměi
- Wade–Giles: Xu^{3} You^{1} mei^{3}

Janice Koh (born December 10, 1973) is a Singaporean actress and a former Nominated Member of Parliament in Singapore.

== Education ==
Koh had her secondary school education at Singapore Chinese Girls' School. She later graduated from the Theatre Studies and Drama programme at Victoria Junior College and the National University of Singapore with an Honours degree in Theatre Studies. She also has a master's degree in Theatre with Distinction from Goldsmiths College, London.

== Career ==
On television, Koh is well known for her role as the ambitious lawyer Angela Ang on the MediaCorp Channel 5 legal drama The Pupil. Her performance earned her an Asian Television Awards 2010 nomination for Best Performance by an Actress in a Leading Role. Other projects include Fighting Spiders and Chase for Channel 5 and the award-winning Singapore Short Story Project. More recently, she played the quirky mom of Amos Lee in Okto's The Dairy of Amos Lee.

A familiar face in the theatre scene, Koh won the coveted Life! Theatre Award for Best Actress in 2003 for her performance as Catherine in David Auburn's Proof and received a Life! Theatre Award Best Actress nomination in 2008 for her role in Ovidia Yu's acclaimed play Hitting (On) Women. Recent work include Pangdemonium's Swimming with Sharks, Alfian Sa'at's sold-out play Cooling Off Day by W!LD RICE, Tan Tarn How's critically acclaimed Fear of Writing,《我爱阿爱》 by The Theatre Practice, Poop by The Finger Players, which was also nominated for the Life! Theatre Best Ensemble Award, The Crab Flower Club by Toy Factory, 120 and Diaspora by TheatreWorks.

Internationally, Koh has toured with a number of productions to major venues and festivals in Europe and Asia, including The King Lear Project to the Kunsten Festival des Arts in Brussels and TheatreWorks' Diaspora at the Edinburgh International Festival.

Koh made her international acting debut in the rom-com Crazy Rich Asians, directed by Jon M. Chu, starring Constance Wu and Henry Golding, and based on the critically-acclaimed novel of the same title by Kevin Kwan. Filming was done on location in both Malaysia and Singapore, where much of the first of three books in the series is based. The film was released globally in 2018, by Warner Bros.

=== Politics ===
In 2012, Koh was selected to be one of nine new Nominated Member of Parliament (NMPs) in Singapore. She was nominated by the Arts community and was chosen from 47 eligible candidates. Koh is known for her support of the Singaporean arts scene, and her desire for transparency in regards to the MDA's censorship rulings.

== Personal life ==
Koh is married to Lionel Yeo and they have two sons.

In late July 2022, Koh was diagnosed with tongue cancer and received treatment for it.

== Filmography ==
=== Film ===
Year	Title	Role	Notes	Ref.
2004	Love Poetry	Dana	TV movie	
2013	Mister John	Lek		
2018	Crazy Rich Asians	Felicity Young		
2025	Amoeba	Auntie Angelica		

=== Television ===
Year	Title	Role	Notes	Ref.
2010	Fighting Spiders	Mabel Lee		
2010–2011	The Pupil	Angela Ang		
2013	C.L.I.F. 2	Chen Yuqi		
2020	Code of Law	Angela Ang	Season 5	

=== Theatre ===
Year	Title	Role	Notes	Ref.
1998	Descendants of the Eunuch	Lead		
2003	Proof	Catherine		
2003	Jointly & Severably	Zee		
2005	Skylight	Kyra Hollis		
2005	Lovepuke	Louise		
2005	Quills	Mdm Royer-Collard		
2006	Diaspora	Main Ensemble		
2009	The Crabflower Club	Lead		
2012	Swimming with Sharks	Lead		
2012	Cooling Off Day	Lead		
2013	Rabbit Hole	Lead		

== Awards ==
- DBS Life! Theatre Award for Best Actress for her performance as Catherine in David Auburn's Proof in 2003.
- In 2008, Koh received a Life! Theatre Award Best Actress nomination for her role in Ovidia Yu's acclaimed play Hitting (On) Women.
- Koh's performance in The Pupil (TV series) earned her an Asian Television Awards 2010 nomination for Best Performance by an Actress in a Leading Role.
- 2021, Best Actress in a Supporting Role, 26th Asian Television Awards, Teenage Textbook: The Series (Nominated)
- 2022, Chevalier of the National Ordre des Arts et des Lettres (France)

== See also ==
- TheatreWorks
