= Rebecca Lim =

Singaporean actress (born 1986)

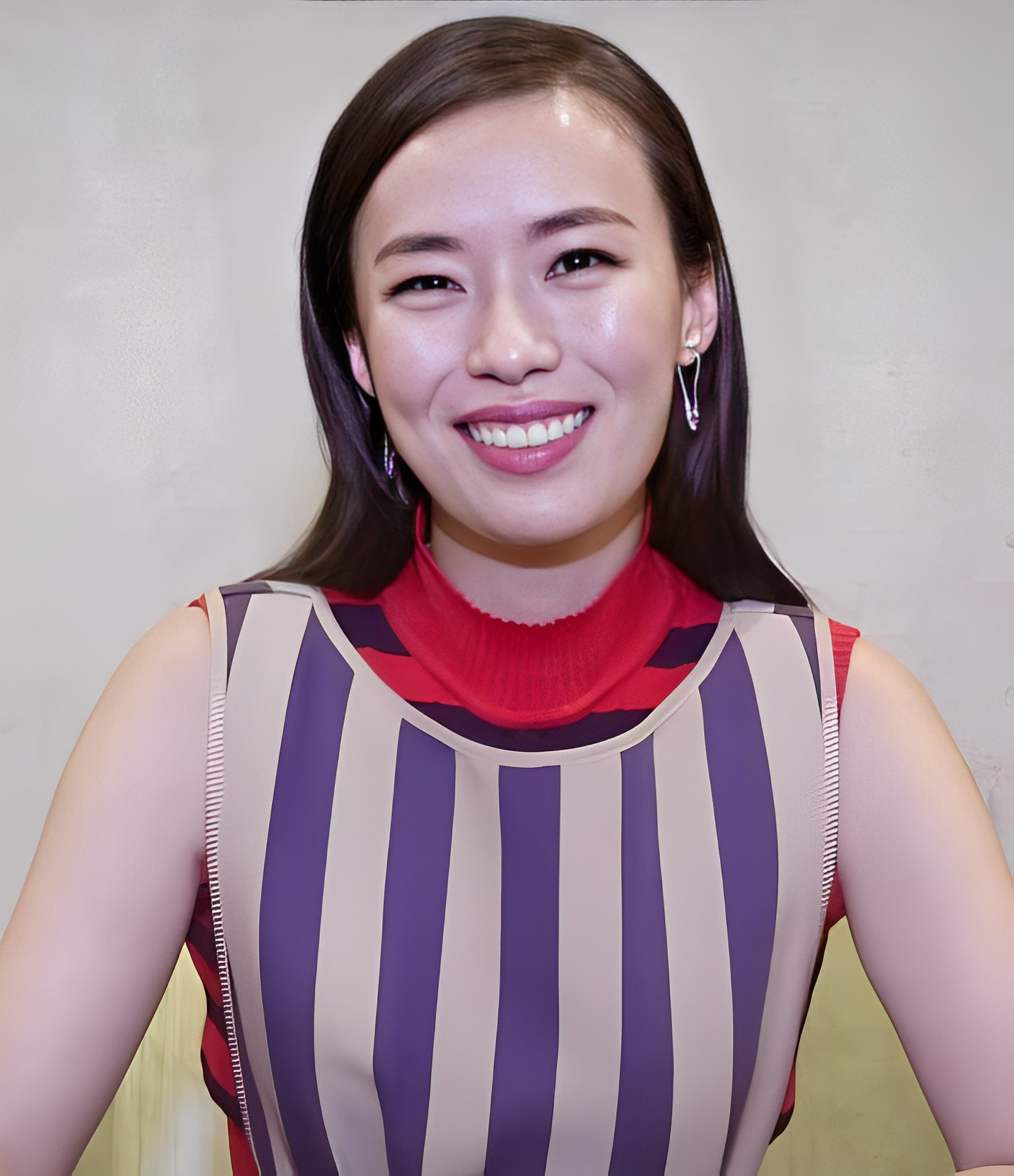
- Lim in May 2017
- Born: 26 September 1986 (age 40); Singapore
- Education: CHIJ Saint Nicholas Girls' School; Victoria Junior College
- Alma mater: Singapore Management University
- Occupations: Actress; host
- Years active: 2006–present
- Spouse: Matthew Webster (m. 2022)
- Children: 2
- Awards: Full list

Chinese name
- Chinese: 林慧玲
- Hanyu Pinyin: Lín Hùilíng

Rebecca Lim Hui Ling (born 26 September 1986) is a Singaporean actress and host. Lim has won Best Actress in a Leading Role at the Asian Television Awards and two Best Actress in a Leading Role awards, a Best Supporting Actress award. Lim also won Best Performance in a Leading Role at the Seoul International Drama Awards. Lim has been the cover girl for numerous fashion magazines, and has been invited to Paris Fashion Week 2019 for Christian Dior and Hermes show. In 2020, Lim was awarded the Best Actress National Winner - Malaysia for her performance in The Bridge.

== Early life ==
Lim was born on 26 September 1986 in Singapore and is the second among three children in a Hokkien family. Lim was educated at CHIJ Saint Nicholas Girls' School and Victoria Junior College before graduating from the Singapore Management University with a Bachelor of Accountancy and Bachelor of Laws degrees.

While studying at the Singapore Management University, Lim participated in the Miss Singapore Universe pageant. She was awarded the Miss Photogenic title, and not long after, she was spotted as a talent and signed on as a part-time actress with Mediacorp. She made the transition to being a full-time actress after her graduation.

== Career ==
Her first leading role in a drama came in 2008 – The Truth, where she co-starred with Tay Ping Hui and Joanne Peh. However, she was criticised for her command of the Chinese language.

In 2009, Lim starred in Fighting Spiders, which garnered positive reviews for her portrayal of Susie Woon, a prostitute. In 2010, the drama had a second season which won her the honours of Actress of the Year at ELLE Singapore Awards 2010.

In 2010, Lim starred in the award-winning Channel 5 law production, The Pupil, where she played a trainee lawyer, Wendy Lim, in Roberts & Fongs. Her performance in The Pupil earned her the Best Actress in a Leading Role at the 2010 Asian Television Awards.

In 2012, Rebecca's Mandarin breakthrough role was her portrayal of a psychiatrist in the Channel 8 drama Unriddle 2. Her performance earned her a Top 10 Most Popular Female Artistes accolade at the annual Star Awards 2012. This was her first nomination and consequently her first win in the category.

In 2013, Lim was nominated for the Best Actress award for Star Awards 2013 for her role in Unriddle 2, her first nomination in the category.

In 2014, Lim was nominated for both the Best Actress and the Best Supporting Actress awards in Star Awards 20 for her roles in Sudden and The Dream Makers respectively. She won the Best Supporting Actress award for her role as the free-spirited airtime sales manager, Lisa, in The Dream Makers.

In 2015, Lim won The New Paper's Babe of the Year for the second time after her first win in 2011. In the same year, she won the Best Actress award at the Star Awards 2015 for her portrayal of Zhang Xueqin in Yes We Can!.

In 2016, as part of a marketing campaign for NTUC Income, an insurance agency in Singapore, Lim announced she is retiring via her Instagram account. The general public believed that she is retiring and the campaign drew backlash when she clarified during a press conference it was part of a marketing campaign and she is not retiring.

In 2016, Lim was awarded the Asian Star Award during Seoul International Drama Awards for her role, Wan Fei Fei in The Journey: Our Homeland, a national building trilogy drama. In the same year, she was also nominated in the Best Actress award for Star Awards 2016 for her role Du Jun Ning in Sealed with a Kiss.

In 2017, Lim was nominated in the Best Actress award for Star Awards 2017 for her role Guan Xin Ni in You can be an Angel 2, a drama to show appreciation to healthcare workers in Singapore. In 2018, Lim won the Star Awards for Best Actress for the drama The Lead at the Star Awards 2018.

In 2019, Lim was nominated for Best Actress Award for her role as Chen Chun Xian / Luna for the drama Blessings 2 at the Star Awards 2019.

== Personal life ==
On 15 November 2021, Lim announced her engagement to Matthew Webster, who is of British-Chinese descent and works in corporate branding. The couple were married at a ceremony held at The Ritz-Carlton Millenia Singapore on 27 November 2022. On 12 September 2023, Lim announced that she was pregnant with the couple's first child. On 30 January 2024, Lim gave birth to a boy. In May 2026, she gave birth to a girl.

== Filmography ==
=== Film ===
Year	Title	Role	Notes	Ref.
2011	The Ultimate Winner	Zhang Zhihui		
2011	Homecoming	Jamie		
2012	Rough Mix	Pamela		
2013	Judgment Day	Rebecca		
2016	100 Yards	Brittany Kim		
2023	Confinement	Wang Siling		

=== Television series ===
Year	Title	Role	Notes	Ref.
2006	Love at 0°C			
2006	Family Matters	Luo Manshi		
2007	Mars vs Venus	Rachel		
2007	Honour and Passion	May		
2007	Stories of Love		Episode: "Bride Out of Order"	
2007	Life Story – Elizabeth Choy	Elizabeth Choy		
2008	The Truth	Chen Shufen		
2008	The Defining Moment	Xiao Ning		
2008	Crime Busters x 2	Hu Huadie / Cai Die		
2008	En Bloc	Ranee		
2008	Calefare	Charlene		
2009	Mr & Mrs Kok (神探妙夫妻)			
2009	The Will (一切从遗嘱开始)	Huang Ying		
2009	Fighting Spiders	Susie Woon	Won Actress of the Year at ELLE Awards 2010	
2010	No Limits	Xu Jiayi		
2010	Breakout	Su Ying		
2010	The Pupil	Wendy Lim	Won Best Actress at 15th Asian Television Awards	
2010	Fighting Spiders	Susie Woon		
2011	Prosperity	Janice Tian		
2011	Secret Garden	Xu Xiaoli		
2011	Secrets For Sale	Lin Yawen		
2011	C.L.I.F.	Moon Liu		
2011	Love Thy Neighbour	Bai Yufang		
2011	The Pupil II	Wendy Lim		
2011	Perfect Deception	Jessica Lee		
2012	Absolutely Charming	Song Xinmei		
2012	Unriddle 2	Gao Jieyu		
2012	Poetic Justice	Feng Luoling		
2012	Everyday Heroes	–	Host	
2012	Code of Law	Wendy Lim		
2012	The Ups and Downs of Ms Chan Poh Geok	Ms Chan Poh Geok		
2012	Of Love And Hidden Charms	Christel		
2013	Start-Up! (创！)	Yin Xuan		
2013	The Dream Makers	Lisa Xiao		
2013	Sudden	Guo Weiqian		
2013	Sudden	Huang Yixin		
2013	TesTube 3 – Umbrella Tales	–		
2014	Yes We Can!	Zhang Xueqin		
2014	Youthful Aspirations (细水长流)	Lin Yi-an		
2014	Code of Law 2	Wendy Lim		
2014	Mata Mata: A New Era	Margaret Chin		
2015	You Can Be an Angel Too	Guan Xin-ni		
2015	Second Chance (流氓律师)	Zhang Xiaoxian		
2015	Love? (限量爱情)	Rebecca Hong		
2015	The Journey: Our Homeland	Wan Feifei		
2015	Sealed with a Kiss	Du Junning		
2015	Mata Mata: A New Generation	Margaret Chin		
2016	The Truth Seekers	Huang Yuyang		
2016	The Dream Job	Jiang Xinya		
2016	You Can Be an Angel 2	Guan Xin-ni		
2016	Hero	Herself		
2017	The Lead	Lin Meizhen		
2017	While We Are Young	Zhong Ai		
2017	Life Less Ordinary	Jesse Leong		
2018	Eat Already? 4	Zhu Ruiyun		
2018	Doppelganger - The Prequel (入侵者前传)	Zhang Ailing		
2018	Doppelganger	Zhang Ailing		
2018	Blessings 2	Zhou Meiyue Luna	Nominated for Best Actress at Star Awards 2019	
2018	Blessings 2	Chen Chunxian	Nominated for Best Actress at Star Awards 2019	
2018	You Can Be an Angel 3 (你也可以是天使3)	Guan Xin-ni		
2018	Missing	Lynn Chao		
2018	The Bridge	Serena Teo		
2019	C.L.I.F. 5	Wang Manting		
2019	The Good Fight (致胜出击)	Yan Yichen		
2020	Who Is Killer? (谁是凶手？)	Kaley Chan		
2020	A Jungle Survivor (森林生存记)	Tang Ruoqi		
2020	Watch Out ! Alexius (小心啊 ! 谢宇航)	Guo Liting		
2020	Watch Out ! Alexius (小心啊 ! 谢宇航)	Guo Liying		
2020	Code of Law : Final	Wendy Lim		
2020	The Bridge Season 2	Serena Teo		
2021	This Land Is Mine	June Chiang		
2021	Leave No Soul Behind (21点灵)	Ling Jingqi		
2022	Soul Doctor (灵医)	Ling Jingqi		
2022	Soul Doctor (灵医)	Ling Jingyao / Ling Jingqi		
2022	Third Rail	Geraldine Hyak (Geri)		
2026	Aunty Lee’s Deadly Delights	Cherril Lim-Peters		

== Discography ==
=== Compilation albums ===
Year	English title	Mandarin title
2015	MediaCorp Music Lunar New Year Album 15	新传媒群星金羊添吉祥
2016	MediaCorp Music Lunar New Year Album 16	新传媒群星金猴添喜庆
2017	MediaCorp Music Lunar New Year Album 17	新传媒群星咕鸡咕鸡庆丰年
2018	MediaCorp Music Lunar New Year Album 18	新传媒群星阿狗狗过好年
2019	MediaCorp Music Lunar New Year Album 19	新传媒群星猪饱饱欢乐迎肥年
2020	MediaCorp Music Lunar New Year Album 20	新传媒群星裕鼠鼠纳福迎春了

== Awards and nominations ==
Organisation	Year	Category	Nominated work	Result	Ref.
Asian Academy Creative Awards	2020	Best Actress - National Winner (Malaysia)	The Bridge	Won	
Asia Contents Awards & Global OTT Awards	2023	Best Lead Actress	Third Rail	Nominated	
Asian Television Awards	2010	Best Actress in a Leading Role	The Pupil	Won	
Asian Television Awards	2014	Best Supporting Actress	The Dream Makers	Nominated	
Asian Television Awards	2023	Best Leading Female Performance (Digital)	Third Rail	Won	
ELLE Singapore Awards	2010	Actress of the Year	Fighting Spiders	Won	
PPCTV Awards	2015	Favourite Female Character (Cambodia)	Sudden	Nominated	
PPCTV Awards	2015	Favourite Lead Actress (Cambodia)	Sudden	Nominated	
PPCTV Awards	2015	Favourite Supporting Actress (Cambodia)	The Dream Makers	Won	
Seoul International Drama Awards	2016	Asian Star Award	The Journey: Our Homeland	Won	
Seoul Webfest 2022	2022	Best Actress	This Land Is Mine	Nominated	
Star Awards	2012	Top 10 Most Popular Female Artistes	—N/a	Won	
Star Awards	2013	Best Actress	Unriddle 2	Nominated	
Star Awards	2013	Top 10 Most Popular Female Artistes	—N/a	Won	
Star Awards	2013	Favourite Female Character	Poetic Justice	Nominated	
Star Awards	2014	Best Supporting Actress	The Dream Makers	Won	
Star Awards	2014	Best Actress	Sudden	Nominated	
Star Awards	2014	Favourite Female Character	Sudden	Nominated	
Star Awards	2014	Top 10 Most Popular Female Artistes	—N/a	Won	
Star Awards	2014	Asian Skin Solution Award	—N/a	Won	
Star Awards	2014	Star Awards for Most Popular Regional Artiste (China)	—N/a	Nominated	
Star Awards	2014	Star Awards for Most Popular Regional Artiste (Malaysia)	—N/a	Nominated	
Star Awards	2014	Star Awards for Most Popular Regional Artiste (Indonesia)	—N/a	Nominated	
Star Awards	2015	Top 10 Most Popular Female Artistes	—N/a	Won	
Star Awards	2015	Best Actress	Yes We Can!	Won	
Star Awards	2015	Favourite Female Character	Yes We Can!	Nominated	
Star Awards	2015	Favourite Onscreen Couple (with Romeo Tan)	Yes We Can!	Nominated	
Star Awards	2015	London Choco Roll Happiness Award	Yes We Can!	Won	
Star Awards	2015	Star Awards for Most Popular Regional Artiste (China)	—N/a	Nominated	
Star Awards	2015	Star Awards for Most Popular Regional Artiste (Cambodia)	—N/a	Nominated	
Star Awards	2015	Star Awards for Most Popular Regional Artiste (Indonesia)	—N/a	Nominated	
Star Awards	2016	Best Actress	Sealed with a Kiss	Nominated	
Star Awards	2016	Top 10 Most Popular Female Artistes	—N/a	Won	
Star Awards	2017	Best Actress	You Can Be an Angel 2	Nominated	
Star Awards	2017	Top 10 Most Popular Female Artistes	—N/a	Won	
Star Awards	2018	Best Actress	The Lead	Won	
Star Awards	2018	Top 10 Most Popular Female Artistes	—N/a	Won	
Star Awards	2019	Best Actress	Blessings 2	Nominated	
Star Awards	2019	Top 10 Most Popular Female Artistes	—N/a	Won	
Star Awards	2021	Best Actress	A Jungle Survivor	Nominated	
Star Awards	2021	Top 10 Most Popular Female Artistes	—N/a	Won	
Star Awards	2022	Top 10 Most Popular Female Artistes	—N/a	Won	
Star Awards	2023	All-Time Favourite Artiste	—N/a	Won	
Star Awards	2023	Best Actress	Soul Doctor	Nominated	
