= Kumar (Singaporean entertainer) =

Singaporean entertainer (born 1968)

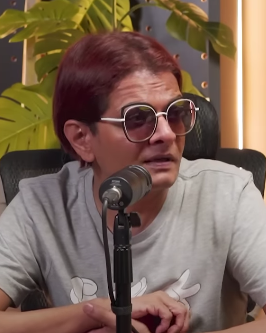
- Kumar in 2024
- Born: Kumarason Chinnadurai; 10 August 1968 (age 58); Singapore
- Occupations: Stand-up comedian; drag queen; television host; actor
- Kumar's voice Kumar speaking on The Daily Ketchup Podcast, recorded c. July 2024

Kumarason Chinnadurai (born 10 August 1968), popularly known as Kumar, is a Singaporean comedian, television host and actor whose entertainment career spans more than three decades. He has worked across stand-up comedy, television, theatre and film and is known for performing in drag. In 2022, Kumar said that he preferred to be described as a comedian who cross-dresses rather than a drag queen. He released his biographical book, Kumar: From Rags To Drag, in September 2011.

== Early life ==
Kumar was born on 10 August 1968 to a South Indian Mudaliar Tamil father from Madras and a Singaporean-born Tamil mother. His father, Chinna Dorai, moved to Singapore in the 1960s and worked for the Society for the Prevention of Cruelty to Animals (SPCA). Kumar's parents separated when he was young, and he and his sisters were subsequently raised by his stepmother, who was his biological mother's younger sister. Kumar has spoken publicly about experiencing abuse during his childhood.

Kumar attended Cairnhill and Selegie Primary schools and later Monk's Hill Secondary School. He developed an interest in Indian dance while at school. After completing his O-Levels, he worked briefly as a cashier before undertaking National Service, during which he served as a combat signaller.

== Stand-up comedy ==
Kumar entered the entertainment industry in the late 1980s, initially working as a singing waiter and later performing at Haw Par Villa. In 1991, he performed at Laughs Comedy Club in Tanglin Shopping Centre, where he played an Indian drag character. He subsequently became associated with the Boom Boom Room, where his combination of stand-up comedy and drag performance helped establish his public profile.

After moving to Far East Square in 2000, Boom Boom Room closed permanently in 2004. Kumar later performed at Gold Dust in Orchard Towers, of which he was part-owner. In 2007, he sold his share and was performing three nights a week at 3-Monkeys Café.

== Television ==
Kumar made his television debut in 1993 as one of the hosts of The Ra Ra Show. The programme expanded his public profile beyond his live performances. Academic analysis of Kumar's television career has noted the different presentation of his television persona compared with his live drag performances.

His later television work included appearances in English and Tamil programmes, as well as hosting travelogue programmes.

== Stage/Theatre ==
Kumar's theatre work dates to the 1990s. His early stage appearances included Dick Lee's musical Hot Pants and Kumar: A Life Alive, a musical based on his career. In 1999, he appeared in T:>Works' production Meena and Me. His subsequent stage credits included ABUSE SUXXX!!! (2001) and Not Guilty (2004).

Kumar has also performed in numerous stand-up productions in Singapore and abroad. Dream Academy productions featuring him have included Kumar The Queen (2007), Kumar: Stripped Bare & Standing Up (2009–2010), Kumar's Amazing Race (2011–2012) and Kumar XXX (2022). He also performed Kumar Unmasked in 2021.

His later live productions included Kumar Guilty (2023) and Kumar Uncut (2024). Kumar Uncut ran at the Sands Theatre at Marina Bay Sands from 10 to 28 July 2024. In 2025, he staged S.O.S. (Save Our Singapore) Kumar at the Sands Theatre.

== Filmography ==
In 2013, Kumar appeared as Kumari Kuppusamy in Everybody's Business.

== Personal life ==
Kumar has performed in drag throughout much of his career. He has said that his family initially had difficulty accepting his cross-dressing performances; his father stopped speaking to him for several years, while his mother initially misunderstood the nature of his work.

Kumar publicly came out as gay during his 2009 performance Kumar: Stripped Bare and Standing Up. He discussed his sexual orientation publicly again in his 2011 biography. In 2022, Kumar said that he preferred to be described as a comedian who cross-dresses rather than as a drag queen.

In 2023, Kumar said that he regarded Sathin, the younger brother of a friend who had lived with him since the age of 18, as his son.
