= Paula Malai Ali =

Bruneian television presenter

- Born: Paula Malai Ali; 3 March 1974 (age 52); Brunei
- Education: International School Brunei; United World College of South East Asia
- Occupations: Broadcaster and actress
- Known for: Television personality
- Spouses: Tunku Azudinshah (m. 2002; div. 2006) Sam Gollestani (divorced)
- Relatives: Jenny Malai Ali (sister); Rachael Malai Ali (sister)

Paula Malai Ali Othman (born 3 March 1974, in Brunei) is a television personality from Brunei. Formerly a veejay for Channel V and presenter for Fox Sports Asia, she is now a Brunei reporter for TVS.

A notable media personality in Asia, Paula has worked as a television and radio presenter, stage actress, and vocalist. She has been selected by international brands, including Redken and Nescafé, to represent their brand image.

== Personal life ==
Paula's Bruneian father is the former Permanent Secretary of Industry and Primary Resources. Her English mother ran a kindergarten in Brunei. She has an identical twin sister named Jenny, who is a famous TV and radio presenter in Brunei, and an older sister named Rachael. Paula had her early education at the International School Brunei, and did her secondary education in Singapore at the United World College of South East Asia.

In 2002, Paula married the Malaysian film producer Tunku Azudinshah Tunku Anuar (also known as "Kudin") – a member of the Kedah Royal Family and nephew of the then-reigning Sultan of Kedah. The wedding was photographed by celebrity wedding photographer Kid Chan. In June 2006, Paula confirmed that she and Kudin had divorced.

Paula subsequently married television producer Sam Gollestani and the couple's first child was born in February 2011. The couple later divorced and remain amicable while co-parenting their son Zane.
