= Keagan Kang =

Australian actor

- Born: 5 May 1976 (age 49); Perth, Western Australia
- Occupation: Actor
- Years active: 1996–present

Keagan Kang (born 5 May 1976) is an Australian actor living and working in Singapore.

Kang's first professional acting role was in Sweat. Soon after, a theatre director invited him to star in the stage play Rosencrantz and Guildenstern Are Dead in Singapore, and his career grew. Some of Kang's notable stage performances include Wit by Margaret Edson, Horst in Bent, Mercutio in Romeo and Juliet, and Gideon in Fairytaleheart.

His film credits include City Sharks, No Through Road, Spoilt, and 2000 AD.

More recently Kang starred in the Australian-Canadian television series Stormworld, and the Australian film Woody Island.

Kang also played a leading role in the Singaporean legal drama series, Code Of Law, as the leading criminal defence lawyer Jacob Fernandez.

He also appeared in the 2012 Singaporean legal drama series The Pupil and the 2023 mystery drama series Veil.
