= The Pupil (TV series) =

- Starring: Rebecca Lim; Adrian Pang; Janice Koh; Vernetta Lopez; Elfaeza Ul Haq; Lim Kay Tong; Vadi Pvss; Carmen Soo; Lin Ru Ping; Jeff Catz; George Young
- Country of origin: Singapore
- Original language: English
- No. of seasons: 2
- No. of episodes: 26

Production
- Executive producer: Lee Thean-jeen
- Running time: 60 minutes (with commercials)

Original release
- Network: MediaCorp Channel 5
- Release: 7 January 2010 – 8 November 2011

The Pupil is a Singaporean drama series that aired on MediaCorp Channel 5, revolving around the legal profession of Singaporean lawyers and the cases they take on as civil litigators. During its span of two years, the first season premiered on 7 January 2010, while the second season premiered on 18 August 2011, which concluded on 8 November of the same year.

The show received favourable reviews and multiple spin-offs were created based on the series, including Code of Law, Derek, and Forensik.

== Cast ==
- Rebecca Lim as Wendy Lim Hwee Ling
- Adrian Pang as Dennis Tang Teng Soon
- Janice Koh as Angela Ang Yi Mei
- Vernetta Lopez as Vivian Lau
- Elfaeza Ul Haq as Nisa Muhd Noor
- Lim Kay Tong as Harris Fong Weng Kiong
- Vadi Pvss as Seelan Ramasamy
- Carmen Soo as Rachel Sung
- Lin Ru Ping as Lim Gaik Kim
- Jeff Catz as Razak Muhd Noor
- Bernard Tan as Vincent Leong
- George Young as Benjamin Wong^{1}
- Fang Rong
- Nicholas Lee

^1 George Young joined the cast in Season 2.

== Episodes ==
| No. overall | No. in season | Title | Original release date | Guest(s) |
|---|---|---|---|---|
| 1 | 1 | "A Matter Of Service" | 7 January 2010 | Bobby Tonelli as Michael Allan; Priscelia Chan as Theresa Wong; Nick Shen as DPP Lawrence Khoo |
| 2 | 2 | "Let The Right One In" | TBA | Karen Lim as Margaret Eng; P. Logan as Ramesh Veerasamy; Laurence Pang as Mr Tang |
| 3 | 3 | "The Customer Is Always Left, Right?" | TBA | Utt as Dr Gregory Lee |
| 4 | 4 | "Hit Me with Your Best Shot" | TBA | Lin Meijiao as Mdm Wong; Utt as Dr Gregory Lee; Beh Min Yan as Li Ming; R Chandran as Anthony Silva |
| 5 | 5 | "Cry Wolf" | TBA | Amy Cheng as Jacqueline; Timothy Nga as Edwin; Lee Yern-wei as Ben |
| 6 | 6 | "As I Lay Dying" | TBA | Tracy Tan as Charlene Gwee |
| 7 | 8 | "Going Going Gone" | TBA | Catherine Sng as Karen; Bernard Tan as Vincent Leong; Henry Heng as Ah Wong; Ong Siew Lin as Lily; Brendon Fernandez as Sam |
| 7 | 8 | "Going Going Gone" | TBA | Catherine Sng as Karen; Bernard Tan as Vincent Leong; Henry Heng as Ah Wong; Ong Siew Lin as Lily; Brendon Fernandez as Sam |
| 9 | 9 | "Blog Out" | TBA | Andie Chen as Andy; Jessica Tan as Kay; Adele Wong as Jacy |
| 10 | 10 | "Family Feud" | TBA | TBA |
| 11 | 11 | "Funny Money" | TBA | Pamelyn Chee as Pam; Alaric Tay as Tuck Meng; May Oon as Siew Sim |
| 12 | 12 | "Medium Rare" | TBA | TBA |
| 13 | 13 | "Final Verdict" | TBA | TBA |

=== Season 2 ===
| Episode | Title | Guest Star(s) | Note |
|---|---|---|---|
| 1 | “Old Habits Dying Hard” | | |
| 2 | "Lucky Charm” | | |
| 3 | “The Truth Out There” | | |
| 4 | “Driven to Distraction” | | |
| 5 | “Security Deposit” | | |
| 6 | “Maid in Singapore” | | |
| 7 | "The Big Pay-Off” | | |
| 8 | “Falling Out of Favour” | | |
| 9 | “The Silent Client” | | |
| 10 | “Neither a Borrower Nor a Lender...” | | |
| 11 | “Scar Tissue” | | |
| 12 | “Extra Curricular” | | |
| 13 | “Staying Abreast of the Game” | | |
