= 20th Hong Kong Film Awards =

2001 Hong Kong Film Awards

- Date: 29 April 2001
- Site: Hong Kong Cultural Centre
- Hosted by: Eric Tsang; Carol Cheng; Gigi Leung; Eric Ng

The 20th Hong Kong Film Awards ceremony was held on 29 April 2001 in the Hong Kong Cultural Centre and hosted by Eric Tsang, Carol Cheng, Gigi Leung and Eric Ng. Eighteen winners in eighteen categories were unveiled. The year's biggest winner was Crouching Tiger, Hidden Dragon, which received eight awards, one award short of the record set by Comrades: Almost a Love Story in 1997. Besides the sixteen regular categories, the 20th Hong Kong Film Awards also presented two special awards, Lifetime Achievement Award and Professional Achievement Award, to veteran actress Pak Suet Sin and action choreographer Yuen Wo Ping respectively.

The nominees were announced on 7 March 2001. Over eighty nominees were in a contest for sixteen award categories. The front runners were Crouching Tiger, Hidden Dragon and In the Mood for Love, with sixteen and twelve nominations respectively.

== Awards ==
Winners are listed first, highlighted in boldface, and indicated with a double dagger (‡).

**Best Film**: **Crouching Tiger, Hidden Dragon**‡; Durian Durian; Jiang Hu - The Triad Zone; In the Mood for Love; Needing You...	**Best Director**: **Ang Lee — Crouching Tiger, Hidden Dragon**‡; Fruit Chan — Durian Durian; Wong Kar-wai — In the Mood for Love; Wilson Yip — Juliet In Love; Johnnie To and Wai Ka-Fai — Needing You...
**Best Screenplay**: **Fruit Chan — Durian Durian**‡; Chan Hing Kai and Amy Chin — Jiang Hu - The Triad Zone; Wong Kar-wai — In the Mood for Love; Wang Hui-ling, James Schamus and Tsai Kuo-jung — Crouching Tiger, Hidden Dragon; Wai Ka-Fai and Yau Nai-Hoi — Needing You...	**Best Actor**: **Tony Leung Chiu Wai — In the Mood for Love**‡; Francis Ng — Juliet In Love; Tony Leung Ka Fai — Jiang Hu - The Triad Zone; Chow Yun-fat — Crouching Tiger, Hidden Dragon; Andy Lau — A Fighter's Blues
**Best Actress**: **Maggie Cheung — In the Mood for Love**‡; Zhang Ziyi — Crouching Tiger, Hidden Dragon; Michelle Yeoh — Crouching Tiger, Hidden Dragon; Sammi Cheng — Needing You...; Qin Hailu — Durian Durian	**Best Supporting Actor**: **Francis Ng — 2000 AD**‡; Chang Chen — Crouching Tiger, Hidden Dragon; Eason Chan — Lavender; Simon Yam — Juliet In Love; Roy Cheung — Jiang Hu - The Triad Zone
**Best Supporting Actress**: **Cheng Pei-pei — Crouching Tiger, Hidden Dragon**‡; Teresa Mo — And I Hate You So; Candy Lo — Time and Tide; Gigi Leung — A War Named Desire; Rebecca Pan — In the Mood for Love	**Best New Performer**: **Qin Hailu — Durian Durian**‡; Candy Lo — Twelve Nights; Candy Lo — Time and Tide; Leehom Wang — China Strike Force; Edison Chen — Gen-Y Cops; Siu Ping-Lam — In the Mood for Love
**Best Cinematography**: **Peter Pau — Crouching Tiger, Hidden Dragon**‡; Kwan Pun Leung — Lavender; Venus Keung — A Fighter's Blues; Jingle Ma and Chan Kwok-Hung — Summer Holiday; Christopher Doyle and Mark Lee — In the Mood for Love	**Best Film Editing**: **William Chang — In the Mood for Love**‡; Eric Kwong — Tokyo Raiders; Azrael Chung — A Fighter's Blues; Tim Squyres — Crouching Tiger, Hidden Dragon; Marco Mak — Time and Tide
**Best Art Direction**: **William Chang — In the Mood for Love**‡; Timmy Yip — Crouching Tiger, Hidden Dragon; Kenneth Yee, David Poon and Pater Wong — Lavender; Silver Cheung — Summer Holiday; Tin Muk — Durian Durian	**Best Costume Make Up Design**: **William Chang — In the Mood for Love**‡; Bruce Yu — Gen-Y Cops; Dora Ng — Lavender; Dora Ng — Tokyo Raiders; Timmy Yip — Crouching Tiger, Hidden Dragon
**Best Action Choreography**: **Yuen Wo Ping — Crouching Tiger, Hidden Dragon**‡; Nicky Lee — Gen-Y Cops; Xiong Xinxin — Time and Tide; Ailen Sit — Tokyo Raiders; Stanley Tong and Ailen Sit — China Strike Force	**Best Original Film Score**: **Tan Dun — Crouching Tiger, Hidden Dragon**‡; Peter Kam — Summer Holiday; Tommy Wai and Joventine Couto Remotigue — Time and Tide; Michael Galasso — In the Mood for Love; Ronald Ng — Lavender
**Best Original Film Song**: **月光愛人 — Crouching Tiger, Hidden Dragon** ‡; Composer: Tan Dun and Jorge Calandrelli; Lyricist: Lee Kar-Yeung; Singer: Coco Lee; 黑夜不再來 — Twelve Nights; Composer: Chan Fai-Yeung; Lyricist: Albert Leung; Singer: Eason Chan; 感情線上 — Needing You; Composer: Cacine Wong; Lyricist: Albert Leung; Singer: Sammi Cheng; 浪花一朵朵 — Summer Holiday; Composer: Richie Jen and Ah Niu; Lyricist: Richie Jen and Ah Niu; Singer: Richie Jen, Ah Niu and Michael Wong; Lavender — Lavender; Composer: Ronald Ng; Lyricist: Albert Leung; Singer: Kelly Chen	**Best Sound Design**: **Eugene Gearty — Crouching Tiger, Hidden Dragon**‡; Paul Pirola — China Strike Force; Kinson Tsang — Gen-Y Cops; Kinson Tsang — Double Tap; Koan Hui, Yu Ka-Lok and Martin Chappell — Time and Tide
**Lifetime Achievement**: **Pak Suet Sin**‡	**Professional Achievement**: **Yuen Wo Ping**‡
