= Richie Jen discography =

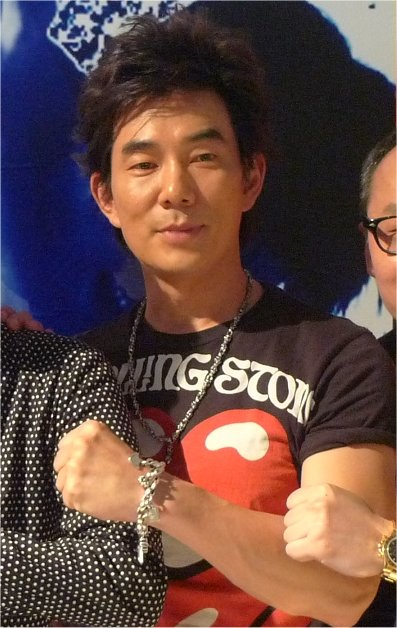
- Jen in 2009
- Studio albums: 17
- EPs: 4
- Compilation albums: 8
- Live albums: 7

The discography of Taiwanese singer Richie Jen (任賢齊) consists of 17 studio albums, 4 extended plays, 8 compilation albums, and 7 live albums. His 1998 single "Hey Girl Look This Way (對面的女孩看過來)", from the album Love Like Pacific Ocean, was the most popular song of the year on Hit FM in Taiwan, ranking number one on the Hit FM Top 100 Singles of the Year chart.

== Studio albums ==
List of studio albums, with release date, label, and sales shown
Title	Album details	Peak chart positions		Sales	Certifications
Title	Album details	TWN	TWN Mand.	Sales	Certifications
Ask Again (再問一次)	Released: December 1990; Label: Synco Cultural Corporation	—	—		
Cold & Tender (冷漠與温柔)	Released: January 1991; Label: Synco Cultural Corporation	—	—		
Fly to My Own Sky (飛向自己的天空)	Released: June 1, 1991; Label: Synco Cultural Corporation	—	—		
I Feel Good! (依靠)	Released: June 14, 1996; Label: Rock Records	12	—	TWN: 160,000	RIT: 6× Platinum
Too Softhearted (心太軟)	Released: December 24, 1996; Label: Rock Records	15	—	Asia: 2,300,000 (Note: It is claimed that the album sold 26 million copies throughout Asia including pirated copies, however, Jen himself stated in an interview that legitimate sales of the album were 2,300,000 copies in Asia and 1,000,000 copies in mainland China.); CHN: 1,000,000	
Hurt Badly (很受傷)	Released: December 9, 1997; Label: Rock Records	11	—	Asia: 1,500,000	
Love Like Pacific Ocean (愛像太平洋)	Released: August 28, 1998; Label: Rock Records	1	—	TWN: 1,200,000	
Desperate With Love (為愛走天涯)	Released: January 27, 2000; Label: Rock Records	—	—	TWN: 300,000	
Angel Brother and Hunk (天使兄弟小白臉)	Released: December 5, 2000; Label: Rock Records	—	—		
A Flying Bird (飛鳥)	Released: September 14, 2001; Label: Rock Records	—	—	Asia: 1,000,000	
One Richie (一個任賢齊)	Released: September 5, 2002; Label: Rock Records	—	—		
So Far So Close (兩極)	Released: December 31, 2004; Label: Rock Records	—	—		
Old Place (老地方)	Released: February 27, 2006; Label: Rock Records	10	8		
If Life's Goin' Without You (如果沒有你)	Released: May 4, 2007; Label: Rock Records	7	6		
R.S.V.P (齊待)	Released: April 28, 2009; Label: Rock Records	9	8		
Daredevil Spirit (不信邪)	Released: December 2, 2011; Label: Media Asia Music, Believe Music	—	6		
On My Way (在路上)	Released: September 1, 2023; Label: Media Asia Music, Bin Music	—	—		

== Extended plays ==
List of extended plays, with release date, label, and sales shown
Title	Album details	Peak chart positions
Title	Album details	TWN
Hey Girl Look This Way (對面的女孩看過來)	Released: October 16, 1998; Label: Rock Records	1
Tight (著紧)	Released: August 10, 1999; Label: Rock Records	—
Xiaoxue (小雪)	Released: January 19, 2000; Label: Rock Records	—
I Am a Rich Man (我是有钱人)	Released: February 6, 2002; Label: Rock Records	—

== Compilation albums ==
List of compilation albums, with release date, label, and sales shown
Title	Album details	Peak chart positions		Sales
Title	Album details	TWN	HK	Sales
Too Softhearted For Love (为了爱而心太软)	Released: September 23, 1997; Label: Rock Records	—	9	
Richie Jen Best Collection (台湾男儿任贤齐认真精选辑)	Released: June 25, 1999; Label: Rock Records	6	3	TWN: 100,000
Asia's Best Hits 2000: Richie Jen (亚洲金曲精选2000: 任贤齐)	Released: June 21, 2000; Label: Rock Records	—	—	
Richie Jen & Friends (任贤齐&Friends)	Released: December 24, 2001; Label: Rock Records	—	—	
Complete Collection (影视歌全集)	Released: May 10, 2002; Label: Rock Records	—	—	
Rock Hong Kong 10th Anniversary: Richie's Greatest Hits (滚石香港黄金十年)	Released: April 28, 2003; Label: Rock Records	—	—	
New Songs + Selected (情义新歌+精选光耀全纪录)	Released: March 25, 2004; Label: Rock Records	—	—	TWN: 100,000
Music Traveler (音乐旅行者)	Released: May 28, 2010; Label: Rock Records	—	—	
