= Para Para Sakura =

2001 Hong Kong film by Jingle Ma

- Film poster
- Traditional Chinese: 芭啦芭啦櫻之花
- Simplified Chinese: 芭啦芭啦樱之花
- Hanyu Pinyin: Bā La Bā La Yīng Zhī Huā
- Jyutping: Baa1 Laa1 Baa1 Laa1 Jing1 Zi1 Faa1
- Directed by: Jingle Ma
- Written by: Susan Chan
- Produced by: Li Zhu-an; David Chan; Kyo Sasaki; Patricia Chong
- Starring: Aaron Kwok; Cecilia Cheung; Ah Niu; Tien Niu; Kazuhiko Nishimura
- Cinematography: Akira Okukawa; Jingle Ma; Chan Kwok-Hung
- Edited by: Kwong Chi-leung
- Music by: Peter Kam
- Production companies: Golden Harvest Company; Red on Red Productions; Tianshan Film Studio
- Distributed by: Golden Harvest Company
- Release date: 21 July 2001
- Running time: 107 minutes
- Country: Hong Kong
- Language: Cantonese
- Box office: HK$6,840,818

Para Para Sakura is a 2001 Hong Kong musical romantic comedy film directed by Jingle Ma, starring Aaron Kwok and Cecilia Cheung. The film was shot in Shanghai and Tokyo.

== Plot ==
Para Para Sakura follows Phillip Wong, a dance instructor from Hong Kong who teaches at a popular dance studio in Shanghai. Despite being a charismatic dancer and physically attractive, Phillip is very insecure as his achromatopsia often leads to socially awkward situations, particularly around women, whom he finds difficult to approach.

One day, Phillip encounters a mysterious woman being chased by a group of men in suits. Upon seeing her, he experiences color for the first time in his life. He intervenes, protecting her in an elaborately choreographed fight scene. The woman, Yuri Sakura, is revealed to be the heiress of a major Japanese keiretsu. She is already engaged to the heir of another conglomerate through an arranged marriage, but she downplays her fiancé’s status, claiming he is an older, unremarkable man.

Despite her engagement, Yuri and Phillip grow closer very quickly. She encourages him to overcome his insecurities, and he teaches her to dance, deepening their emotional connection. Eventually, Yuri is summoned back to Japan to fulfill her arranged marriage.

Just as Phillip thought he'd never see her again, Yuri unexpectedly appears in Phillip's dance class, announcing that she has called off the engagement. Her decision prompts a widespread corporate backlash. Her family offers a bounty of 3 million RMB for her capture, sparking a citywide manhunt. Even Phillip's closest friends attempt to convince him to turn her in.

Yuri proposes that they flee to Morocco to get as far away as possible from Asia. Phillip agrees, and they make plans to depart incognito. However, his best friends deceive him last second into attending a secret meeting with Yuri's mother and her fiancé, a young, wealthy, and charismatic businessman, contrary to what Yuri had told him. They badger him to let her go.

The confrontation leads to a heated exchange between Phillip and Yuri. Phillip is incensed that Yuri misled him about her fiancé's identity and social status. Yuri, in turn, accuses Phillip of not trusting her, despite all she's done, by going behind her back to meet her family. The argument ends in a painful breakup, and Yuri says that the marriage is back on. She flies to Japan with her family and fiancé.

Emotionally devastated, Phillip turns to alcohol and womanizing. His friends are worried for him, expressing remorse for their earlier betrayal, and urge him to fight for Yuri one last time. He travels to Japan and arrives just before the traditional san-san-kudo ceremony that formalizes the marriage. Phillip interrupts the event with a heartfelt speech about how only Yuri can make him see the world in color.

Although visibly moved, Yuri says Phillip is too late, and drinks her glass of sake, making the union official. Her husband gives Phillip a decorative sensu as a parting gift. Phillip is devastated once again, and decides to return to China. On the return journey, however, Phillip discovers a hidden message inside the fan instructing him to meet at a park at noon.

At the park, Phillip encounters Yuri's husband, who reveals that the marriage is a strategic formality between their families intended to solidify a corporate merger and that he is himself in love with another woman. Yuri then appears, and the film concludes with Yuri and Phillip reunited, dancing together to the titular song, “Para Para Sakura.”

== Reception ==
Para Para Sakura received mixed to negative reviews upon release. Critics praised the film's colorful production design and stylish choreography, but found the plot and theme to be rather shallow.

On Chinese review platform Douban, the film holds a score of approximately 6.1/10, which is among Kwok's worst showings. Similarly, Rotten Tomatoes audience reviews describe it as “far‑fetching [and] way too comic,” with ratings around 2/5 stars.

Still, the closing number “Para Para Sakura” was nominated for Best Original Film Song at the 21st Hong Kong Film Awards in 2002, and is considered one of Aaron Kwok's most popular songs.

== Cast ==
- Aaron Kwok as Philip Wong (Sexy King)
- Cecilia Cheung as Yuriko Sakurada
- Ah Niu as Henry Ko
- Tien Niu as Yamfeifei, Yuriko's Mother
- Kazuhiko Nishimura as Shunichi Kukukawa

== Sources ==
- Para Para Sakura at IMDb
- "Movie Reviews, Showtimes and Trailers - Movies - New York Times - The New York Times". Movies & TV Dept. The New York Times.
- http://au.rottentomatoes.com/m/para_para_sakura/about.php
- https://movies.yahoo.com/movie/1807634811/details
