= Europe Raiders =

2018 Hong Kong-Chinese film by Jingle Ma

- Theatrical release poster
- Traditional Chinese: 歐洲攻略
- Simplified Chinese: 欧洲攻略
- Hanyu Pinyin: Ōuzhōu gōnglüè
- Directed by: Jingle Ma
- Written by: Xiao Peng
- Produced by: Jacky Pang
- Starring: Tony Leung; Kris Wu; Tiffany Tang; Du Juan; George Lam
- Cinematography: Jingle Ma
- Edited by: Yan Ting-ting; Cheung Ka-fai (supervisor)
- Music by: Peter Kam
- Production company: Master China Films Ltd.
- Distributed by: Jet Tone Films; Inlook Media
- Release date: August 17, 2018
- Countries: Hong Kong; China
- Languages: Cantonese; Mandarin; English; Italian; Klingon
- Box office: US$22.4 million

Europe Raiders (Chinese: 欧洲攻略) is a 2018 action thriller film directed by Jingle Ma, as the third film in his Raiders franchise, following Tokyo Raiders (2000) and Seoul Raiders (2005). A Hong Kong-Chinese co-production, the film was released on August 17, 2018. The movie's dialogue contains several lines of Klingon.

== Plot ==
Lam Choi Fung and Wang Chao Ying are known respectively as the number 1 and 2 of the bounty hunter world for many years. When the "Hand of God" surveillance program created by the world's top hacker Mercury gets stolen, the CIA sends both Lam and Wang to investigate.

== Cast ==
- Tony Leung Chiu-wai as Mr. Lam
- Kris Wu as Le "Rocky" Qi
- Tiffany Tang as Ms. Wang
- Du Juan as Sophie
- George Lam as "Mercury"
- Jakob Graf as Peter Lawson
- Alberto Lancellotti as an Italian Mafia Boss
- Daniel Gutin as CIA Intelligence Director

=== Special guest appearance ===
- Cung Le as "Black Mantis"
- Jeeja Yanin as "White Mantis"

== Production ==
Filming began on August 31, 2016, in Italy.

== Reception ==
As of the opening weekend, the Europe Raiders film has received a score of 9/10 review from Avi Offer, who described it as a crowd-pleasing thrill ride.

The film debuted promisingly in second place on its opening Friday in China, but dropped to fifth and then seventh place on the weekend.
