= Arctic Catfish scandal =

2023 political scandal in China

The Arctic Catfish scandal was an online scandal in China in March 2023. A female netizen with a user ID named "Arctic Catfish" on Sina Weibo flaunted her wealth and claimed her family had 9-figure savings due to her grandfather's embezzlement of public funds. She also used racist terms to attack Chinese netizens who had argued with her. Arctic Catfish's remarks led to an online uproar in China. On October 10, the Shenzhen government, which her grandfather used to work for, announced that Arctic Catfish's grandfather was punished due to his previous improper behavior.

The uproar lasted for over 200 days with other users eventually concluding the woman's grandfather was Zhong Gengci, a former transport bureau official in Shenzhen who retired around 2007. Zhong Gengci was investigated in October 2023 and was expelled from the Communist Party, had any illicit gains confiscated and had his pension reduced.

== Incident progression ==
On May 22, 2023, an account called "Arctic Catfish" on Sina Weibo posted "What can I do, I've run. (Note: The original character “润” holds the definition of moist or lubricate and is Mainland China internet slang, because the English pronunciation of the pinyin is rùn, similar to "run". It expresses a "run," or "flee" meaning and can also refer to leaving China or settling overseas.)" The IP address being found to be in Australia. Soon after, a Netizen commented on using a foreign App while abroad, and Arctic Catfish replied: “So much of our family's money is provided by 'leeks', (Note: Leek refers to suppressed, lower-class populations.) so how can I not like it?" "I only know that my family makes nine figures, whatever platform I want to muddy, I can muddy, whatever country I want to be in, I can be in…." further using phrases such as "little spider", "it's hard to change one's character", and "Chinese words" (Note: Derived from a phonetic translation of China from Japanese (Shina of 支那) and is a derogatory term for Chinese people. The original terms used are “支性难改” and “支言支语” with the character “支” being the discriminatory aspect of the word.) to insult her online friends. Shortly after, this led to hot debate on Chinese social media platforms, becoming a high level public matter both online and offline.

The controversy resulting in Arctic Catfish's wealth flaunting was long-lasting. According to her shared content, her grandfather was a Shenzhen government official retired over 10 years, posted to over 30 countries, and had a friend in the Grades of the armed forces of China. In a post on February 6, she wrote that her grandfather was sent to New York with "feeling greedy" written on his face. Afterwards, some media reported that her grandfather was Zhong Gengci, the former director of the Freight Management Bureau of the Shenzhen Municipal Transportation Bureau.

On March 24, 2023, Zhong Gengci responded to China Newsweek, saying that his family having nine figures was not true. He revealed he retired in 2007 was the director of the Shenzhen District Transportation Bureau and "worked honestly until retirement." Relevant officials investigated. On March 24, 2023, the Shenzhen District Transportation Bureau issued an incident report, confirming that Arctic Catfish's grandfather Zhong Gengci, a former cadre of the Bureau's Freight Branch, and that Zhong Gengci had retired on November 30, 2007; the Bureau promised to conduct an investigation on the relevant information and promptly report the situation. After the fermentation of the incident, Sina Weibo rapidly cleared the posts of Arctic Catfish and banned the account.

== Continuation of events ==
In the six months between the release of the Shenzhen Municipal Transportation Bureau's report on the situation on March 24, 2023, and the release of the investigation and handling results report by the Clean Shenzhen (Note: This is a government website for the Central Commission for Discipline Inspection : 廉洁深圳网) website on October 10, 2023, the topic has not faded from Chinese media platforms such as Sina Webo and Zhihu.

On April 25, 2023, Shenzhen Municipal Transportation Bureau responded to reporters, saying they were investigating the incident but had not yet resolved it.

On June 29, Shenzhen Municipal Transportation Bureau responded to reporters that the Shenzhen Central Commission for Discipline Inspection had begun to investigate, that there was no schedule, to be patient for their report, and that the Bureau no longer held authority to investigate the matter.

On August 25, a journalist from Da Wen News called the Shenzhen Municipal Transportation Bureau's general duty room; the office worker who answered the call said they could not answer. The reporter then called the Shenzhen disciplinary inspection and supervision hotline published by the Bureau but the staff responded "please wait for a followup report."

On September 10, 2023, the People's Daily Douyin (TikTok) account shared a response from the Bureau on the Arctic Catfish wealth flaunting incident. Some Netizens asked the Bureau to share information. In its reply letter, the Shenzhen Municipal Transportation Bureau stated that the public information requested by Netizens does not belong to the information produced or obtained by the bureau in the process of performing administrative management functions, nor does it belong to government information, so it will not be disclosed. Some media quoted legal experts as saying that Netizens who applied for information disclosure from the Bureau "used the wrong method" because "investigation information on whether civil servants violated discipline" does not constitute government information. After being questioned by netizens, many official accounts of the Bureau closed comments sections.

On September 12, 2023, reporters from Haibao News verified the situation with the Shenzhen Municipal Transportation Bureau regarding the reply letter. Staff said they would notify relevant departments who would then conduct an investigation.

On September 14, the Bureau responded to media, promising to reply with specific results within 15 business days (October 10 of the same year). The afternoon of October 10, journals called the Bureau office numerous times; the staff made no comment.

== Investigation results ==
On October 10, 2023, the Shenzhen Commission for Discipline Inspection and Shenzhen Municipal Supervisory Committee jointly published a report on the investigation and results. According to the report, Zhong Gengci committed the following disciplinary violations:

- Being disloyal and dishonest to the Party, committing multiple instances of collusion to avoid organization scrutiny
- Taking advantage of the opportunity to profit and engaging in illegal profit-making activities
- Holding unauthorized concurrent positions and receiving compensation
- Exploiting his position for his own benefit and illegally receiving goods or money from others

He was judged to have violated the political integrity and disciplines of the Chinese Communist Party, constituting a serious violation of duty. In accordance with the "Oversight Law of the People's Republic of China, the "Regulations on Disciplinary Actions by the Communist Party of the People's Republic of China," the "Law of the People's Republic of China on Governmental Sanctions for Public Employees" and similar regulations, the Shenzhen Disciplinary Inspection Committee discussed the following disciplinary actions for Zhong Gengci:

- Expulsion from the Party and retirement benefits determined as those of a Level 2 Section Member (Note: Level 2 is the lowest ranked level in the Civil service of China#Levels and ranking system)
- Confiscation of illegal gains

== Zhong Gengci ==
Zhong Gengci was born November 1947 in Shenzhen, Guangdong province. He received tertiary education and started working in February 1968. In June 1971 he entered the Chinese Communist Party. He served successively in the former Shenzhen Municipal Transportation Bureau's Futian, Shenzhen branch as deputy director and Director, Director of the Luohu, Shenzhen branch, and Director of the freight management branch. He retired in November 2007.

== Media commentary ==
China Workers Network's commentary article does not think the Arctic Catfish issue has been satisfactorily resolved. Official reports cannot be considered to be "anti-corruption success." The official report did not include the “transfer of suspected criminal issues to judicial authorities” present in similar cases. Official reports merely give a rough summary with no detailed data, not reflecting public concerns.

Shangyou News special commentary reporter Lin Feng believes corruption governance is related to the public's support, the government's public image, and the faith in it. We cannot ignore any clues of disciplinary or law violations. We must proactively investigate, showcasing no leniency and taking the initiative to speak out and clarify doubts in a timely manner.

A People's Daily online commentary essay stated the official announcement was recognized by the public, preventing a public opinion initiated corruption and accountability investigation going unanswered and satisfying a majority of netizen expectations. It satisfied the majority of netizens' pursuit of truth and the urgent need for impartialness, displaying a sense of justice that corrected public knowledge, "bringing order out of chaos."

A Deutsche Welle China column quoted netizen comments stating the official report is like "drinking three glasses as punishment," (Note: In China "drinking three glasses" is commonly seen banquet/table etiquette for both toasting and for expressing apologies.) the punishment is too light and is the "best Kaogong [a test of the civil service of China] advertisement."

Well-known Chinese media presence Hu Xijin, former editor in chef of the Global Times, analyzed that the official report's lack of mention of Zhong Genci's criminal investigation might be "related to the fact that the amount of money obtained from violations of discipline and law was not enough to file a case, and that some things had already exceeded the statute of limitations for prosecution under the Criminal Law."

Radio Free Asia said that in a public opinion poll conducted by Phoenix Television on the handling of the incident, 80% of netizens were unsatisfied, with only 12% feeling satisfied. Netizens thought the published information was insufficient, including that it did not mention the "9 figures account," that there was no specific amount in the notice on Zhong Gengci's violations of discipline and law, and that there was no explanation for the long investigation process; some netizens even called into question whether the punishment was too light.

According to a Dazhong Daily report, on the afternoon of October 11, 2023 the two hashtags "#Arctic Catfish's county-hating comments should be investigated" and "#Government respond to questions about light punishment" trended on Sina Webo. Many netizens thought the content of the official report was fairly simple and thought Zhong Gengci's punishment was too light. Many netizens were also unsatisfied that Arctic Catfish received no penalty.

== Related information ==
=== Jinyu Far East Company ===
At the beginning of the incident, some media found through Tianyancha that Zhong Gengci, the legal representative and chairman of Jinyu Far East (Yangshan) Co., Ltd., had the same name as the grandfather of the netizen "Arctic Catfish", and was suspected to be the party involved in the above incident. The company was established in September 2003 with a registered capital of US$12 million through the Hong Kong Jinyue company, established September 9, 2001, It was dissolved in November 2007 when Zhong Gengci retired.

According to the understanding of journalists from the market supervision department, Jinyu Far East (Yangshan) Co., Ltd. was established September 9, 2003 with Hong Kong Jinyue Co holding 100% of ts equity shares. On August 25, 2003, Hong Kong Jinyu appointed Zhong Gongci and four others as members of the board of directors with Zhong Gongci serving as chairman. Related documents show there is a Zhong Gengci was born in 1958 in Hsinchu County, Taiwan, who has the same name and surname as the Zhong Gengci involved in the incident but is a different person.

Media believed that this may be related to Zhong Gongci.

=== Huangmin investigation ===
On March 3, 2024, former Shenzhen deputy mayor Huang Min was suspected of violations of discipline and law. He was subjected to disciplinary review and supervisory investigation by the Guangdong Provincial Commission for Discipline Inspection and Supervision.

He served as director of the Transportation Department of the Shenzhen Municipal Transportation Bureau from 1999 to 2001, deputy director of the Shenzhen Municipal Transportation Bureau from 2001 to 2008, secretary of the Party Leadership Group and director of the Shenzhen Municipal Transportation Bureau (Municipal Port Authority) in 2008, and secretary of the Party Leadership Group and director (director) of the Shenzhen Municipal Transportation Commission (Municipal Port Authority) in 2010.

Since Huang Min was Zhong Gengci's superior, some media mentioned the Arctic catfish incident again in their reports.
