= Public light bus =

Minibus used for public transport services in Hong Kong

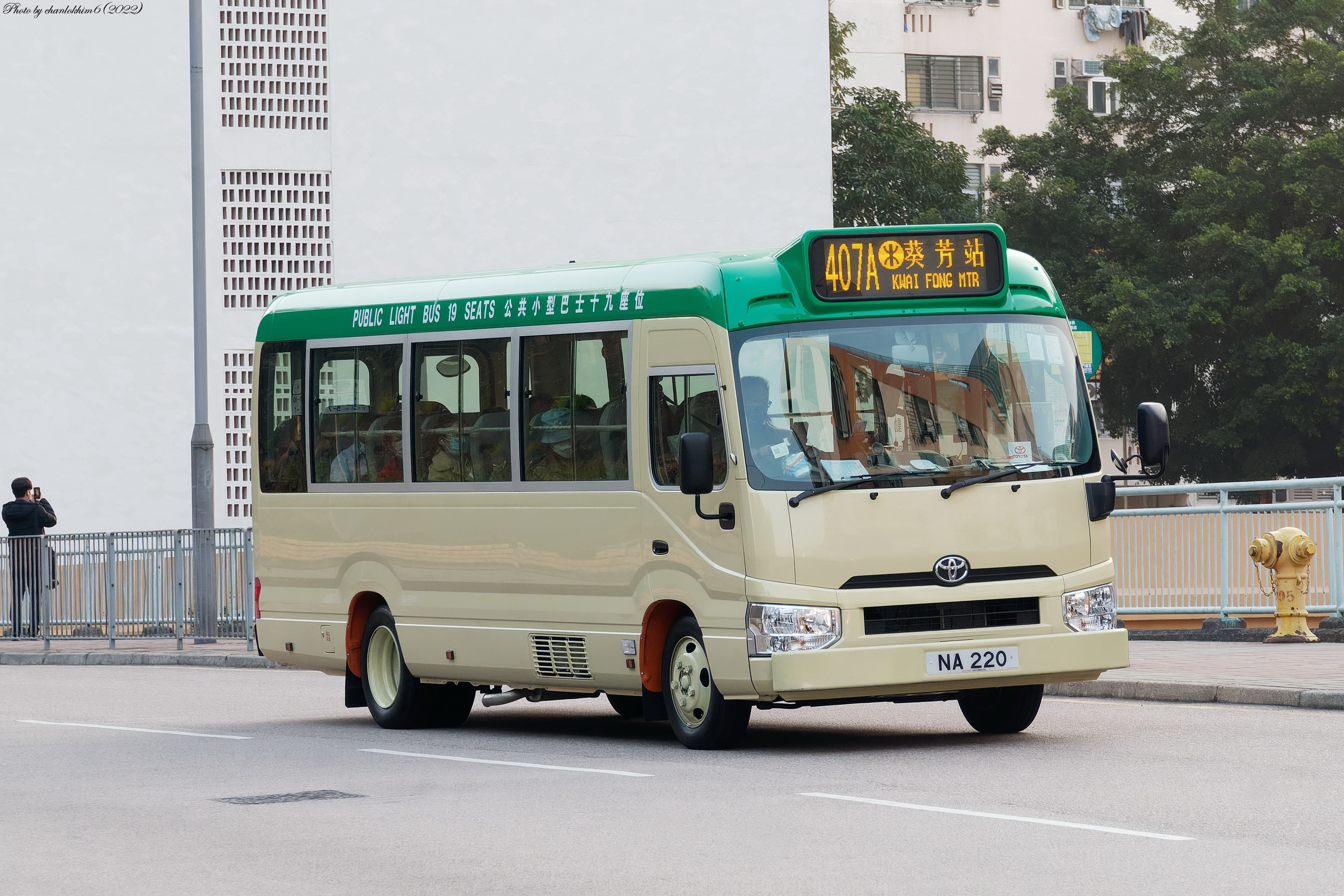
- A Toyota Coaster green minibus ('GMB')
- Chinese: 公共小型巴士
- Cantonese Yale: Gūngguhng Síuyìhng Bāsí
- Literal meaning: Public light bus
Transcriptions
Standard Mandarin
- Hanyu Pinyin: Gōnggòng Xiǎoxíng Bāshì
Yue: Cantonese
- Yale Romanization: Gūngguhng Síuyìhng Bāsí
- Jyutping: Gung1gung6 Siu2jing4 Baa1si2

Alternative Chinese name
- Chinese: 小巴
- Cantonese Yale: Síubā
- Literal meaning: Minibus
Transcriptions
Standard Mandarin
- Hanyu Pinyin: Xiǎobā
Yue: Cantonese
- Yale Romanization: Síubā
- Jyutping: Siu2baa1

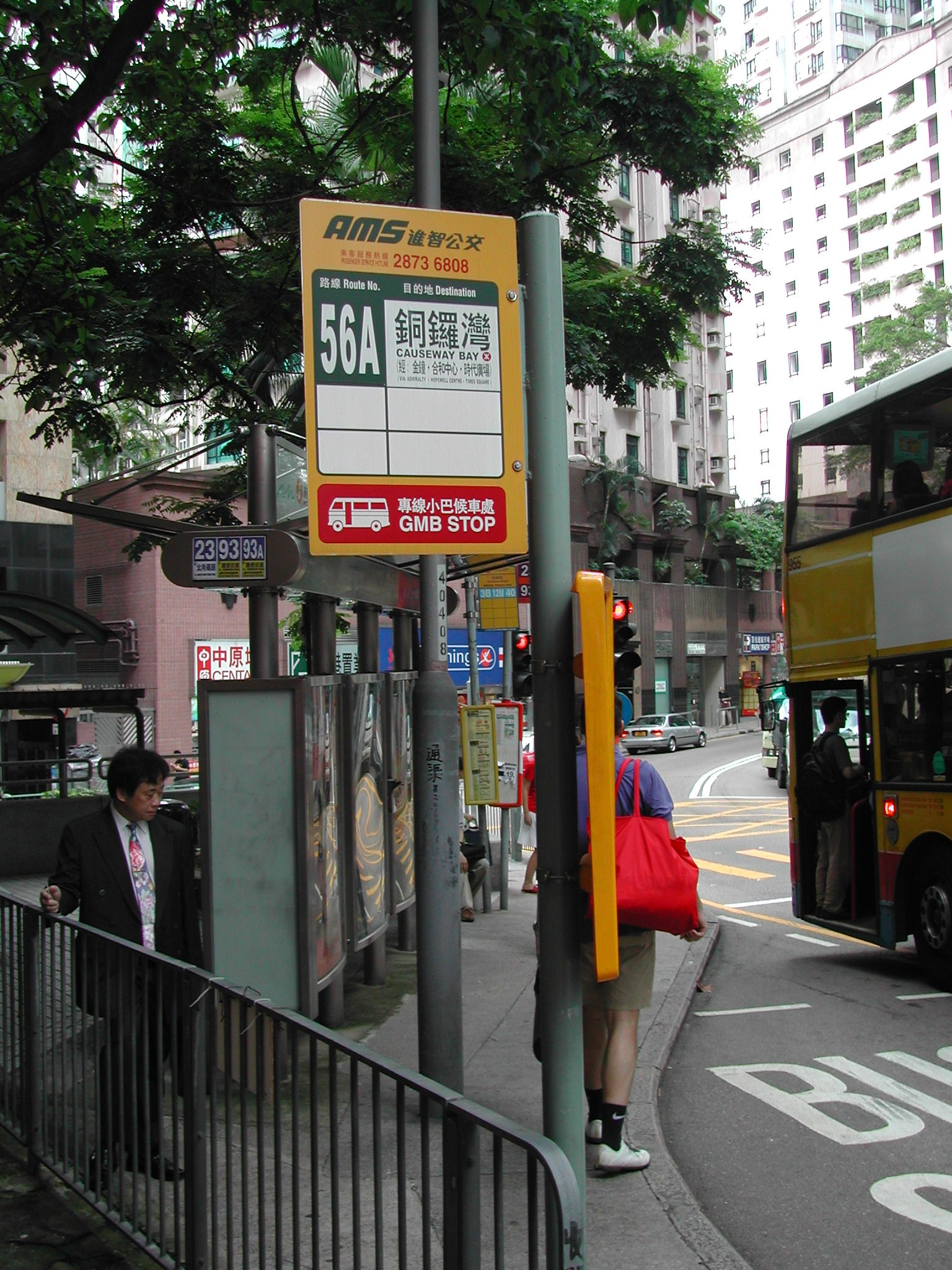
A new style of minibus stops seen on Robinson Road in the Mid-levels of Hong Kong

The public light bus (PLB) or minibus is a public transport service in Hong Kong. It uses minibuses to provide quicker transport and to serve areas that standard Hong Kong bus lines cannot reach as efficiently. The vehicles are colloquially known by the loanword Van仔 (Jyutping: wen1 zai2; Cantonese Yale: Van jái; lit. 'Van child or Van-ette').

Depending on the type of vehicle, minibuses carry a maximum of 16 or 19 seated passengers; no standing passengers are allowed. Minibuses typically offer a faster and more efficient transportation solution due to their small size, limited carrying capacity, frequency and diverse range of routes, although their fares are generally slightly higher than those of standard buses. The popularity of minibus services in Hong Kong can be attributed to Hong Kong's high population density, as well as the ability of the minibuses to navigate narrow and winding roads which standard buses cannot.

== Overview ==
Minibuses in Hong Kong are licensed either as green minibuses (GMBs) or red minibuses (RMBs), the former restricted to fixed-fare, fixed-route operation, the latter not so restricted. RMBs substitute red for green on the external roof of the bus, although originally the distinction was made by the colour of the stripe around the midsection of the vehicle. Otherwise, the two versions of minibus are identical in appearance, both sporting a predominantly cream-coloured body.

Most minibuses are Toyota Coasters, but a new and environmentally friendly Iveco Daily Green minibus has also been introduced as part of a recent scheme in Hong Kong to increase the quality of the buses. Most of the buses run on Autogas (liquefied petroleum gas or LPG). This type of fuel is not only cheaper, but also reduces particulate emissions. The transport commission is making further efforts to reduce emissions by providing incentives for bus drivers to make the switch to even more efficient electric vehicles.

As of 2014, there were 4,350 public minibuses in Hong Kong, of which 3,150 were GMBs and 1,200 were RMBs. The operations of these two types of services are regulated through conditions imposed by the Commissioner for Transport under the passenger service licences (PSLs).

Since the income of minibus drivers are usually earned individually rather than paid by companies, speeding is very common among minibus drivers so that they can earn more by driving more rounds. This phenomenon is commonly mocked as "minibuses of death" (Chinese: 亡命小巴; Cantonese Yale: móhngmihng síubā). In response to public concerns, from 2012, all public minibuses were required to install speed alarms activated at 80 km/h. On all public minibuses, a large digital speedometer must also be installed on the interior ceiling, adjacent to the driver's seat, facing passengers, enabling them to monitor the current speed.

== History ==
The beginnings of public minibus service can be traced to a local minibus system (Chinese: 黑牌車; Cantonese Yale: Hāakpáai chē) used in the New Territories before the 1960s. When, during the 1967 Hong Kong riots, workers of the two main franchised public bus services, China Motor Bus and Kowloon Motor Bus, went on strike bringing buses and trams to a halt, such services stepped in. One of the routes during the 1967 Hong Kong riots was from Jordan Road Ferry Pier to Yuen Long, which can be considered as the first minibus route in the New Territories. After 1967, they were allowed to operate in the urban areas of Hong Kong to ease commuter chaos.

At the time people with mini-vans provided transport to the public for a small charge. The mini-vans were mainly servicing in the New Territories areas such as Yuen Long, Sheung Shui and Fanling, giving a shuttle bus service to the people living in the rural areas. The government turned a blind eye even though it was against traffic laws to carry passengers without a passenger service licence. The 1969 legislation legalising the service making some 5,000 licences available for drivers caused some controversy. Some believed it was wrong of the government to issue licences to people who had been profiting from an illegal activity.

The first generation light buses were vans carrying nine passengers. The buses had a black and white chequered stripe and were colloquially referred to as zebra cars (Chinese: 斑馬車; Cantonese Yale: Bāanmáh chē). The chequered stripe is the pattern still used by Lee On NT Taxi Co 利安的士公司 on its fleet of taxi. This design later gave way to the red-striped vans (colloquially, "red bus" or "14 seater"). Seating increased over the years from 9 to 14, then to 16 and, finally, to 19. The destination signage at the top front of minibuses did not appear until 1977 and the rear bench seat disappeared altogether with the prevalence of air-conditioning equipment installation.

== Usage ==
A passenger wishing to take a minibus simply hails the minibus from the street kerb like a taxi. A minibus can generally be hailed down at any point along a route, subject to traffic regulations, although sometimes particular stops are marked out. To alight from a minibus, a passenger customarily calls out to the driver where they wish to get off, drivers generally acknowledging by simply raising their hand. Tourists have difficulty with this system, as it generally requires both intimate local street knowledge and prior training in Cantonese. Passengers often call out landmarks, intersecting streets and other distinctive features (such as immediately before or after a no-stopping zone). Green minibuses may have fixed stops. Some Green minibuses are now equipped with a bell operated similarly to those found on the larger buses, and ringing it indicates that a passenger wishes to alight at the next stop. It became a regulatory requirement that Red minibuses registered on or after 15 September 2017 also contain bells. Calling out to the driver, however, remains popular.

== Green minibuses ==
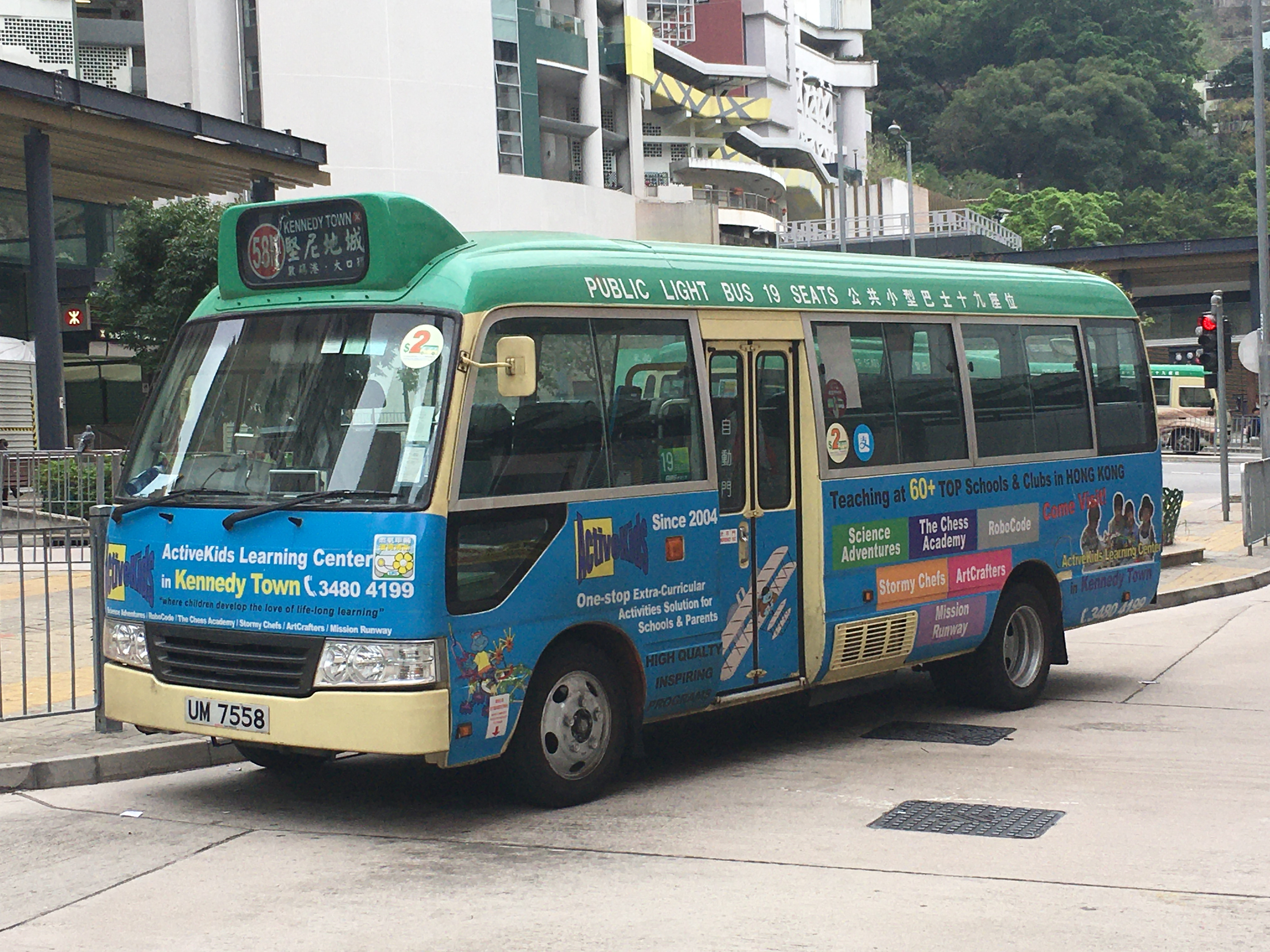
A 19-seat low-floor green minibus

Green minibuses (GMBs) operate a scheduled service, with fixed routes and fixed fares. There are currently around 280 GMB buses routes with route numbers assigned. The exact fare must be tendered, or payment can be made by Octopus card. On some routes, passengers may pay a portion of the full fare (called section fare) if they are only travelling a section of the route. Sections are usually distinctive physical landmarks, such as crossing a tunnel or a bridge.

== Red minibuses ==
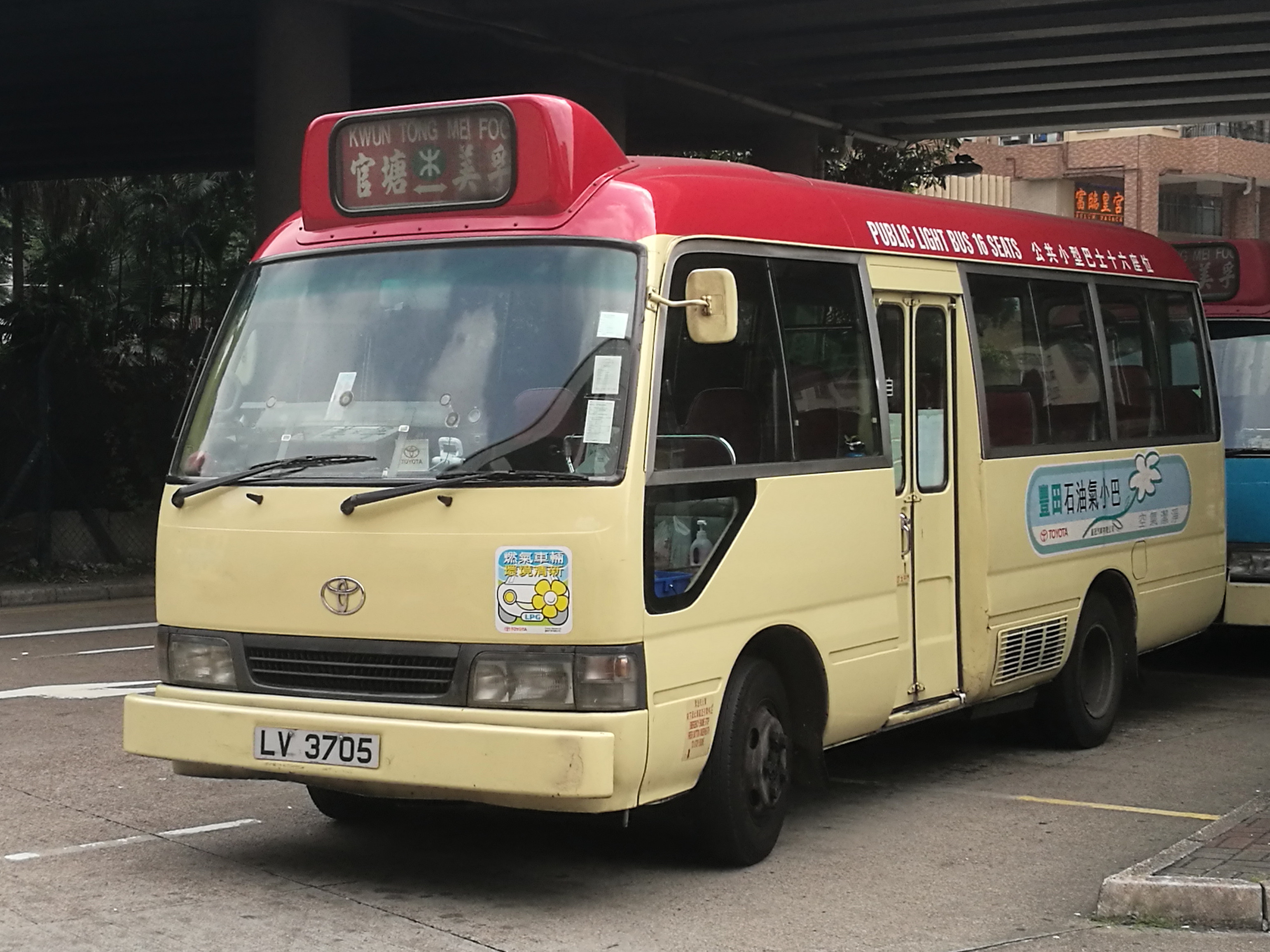
A red public light bus

Red minibuses (RMBs) are a kind of share taxi, which run a non-scheduled service, although routes may, in effect, become fixed over time. RMBs may operate anywhere where no special prohibitions apply, without control over routes or fares. The PLB system is intended to be flexible and responsive to market demand.

On some routes red minibuses may run throughout the day (24-hour service), such as Tai Po-Mong Kok, Tsuen Wan-Kwun Tong, Kwun Tong-Mong Kok, Yuen Long-Jordan Road, etc. Other routes may only run as midnight services, such as from Yuen Long-Causeway Bay, taking over as higher-capacity services, such as franchised bus operators or mass transit railway underground, close.

In most RMBs, passengers pay just before they alight. Though change for cash payment may be available, a small amount may be deducted by the driver for the inconvenience of handling it. Only a few of these red minibuses are equipped to accept payment by Octopus card. Fares and timetables are not regulated by the Government. Thus, at times, RMBs may be more expensive than GMBs.

Destinations displayed on RMBs are sometimes identified by landmarks long gone, such as Daimaru (Chinese: 大丸) in Causeway Bay, the defunct department store, or the KCR logo, a former railway company serving the New Territories before 2007. The numbers they display are a legacy of the pre-1973 route-numbering in the New Territories, being the same route numbers used by the large franchised bus operators.

== Fleet ==
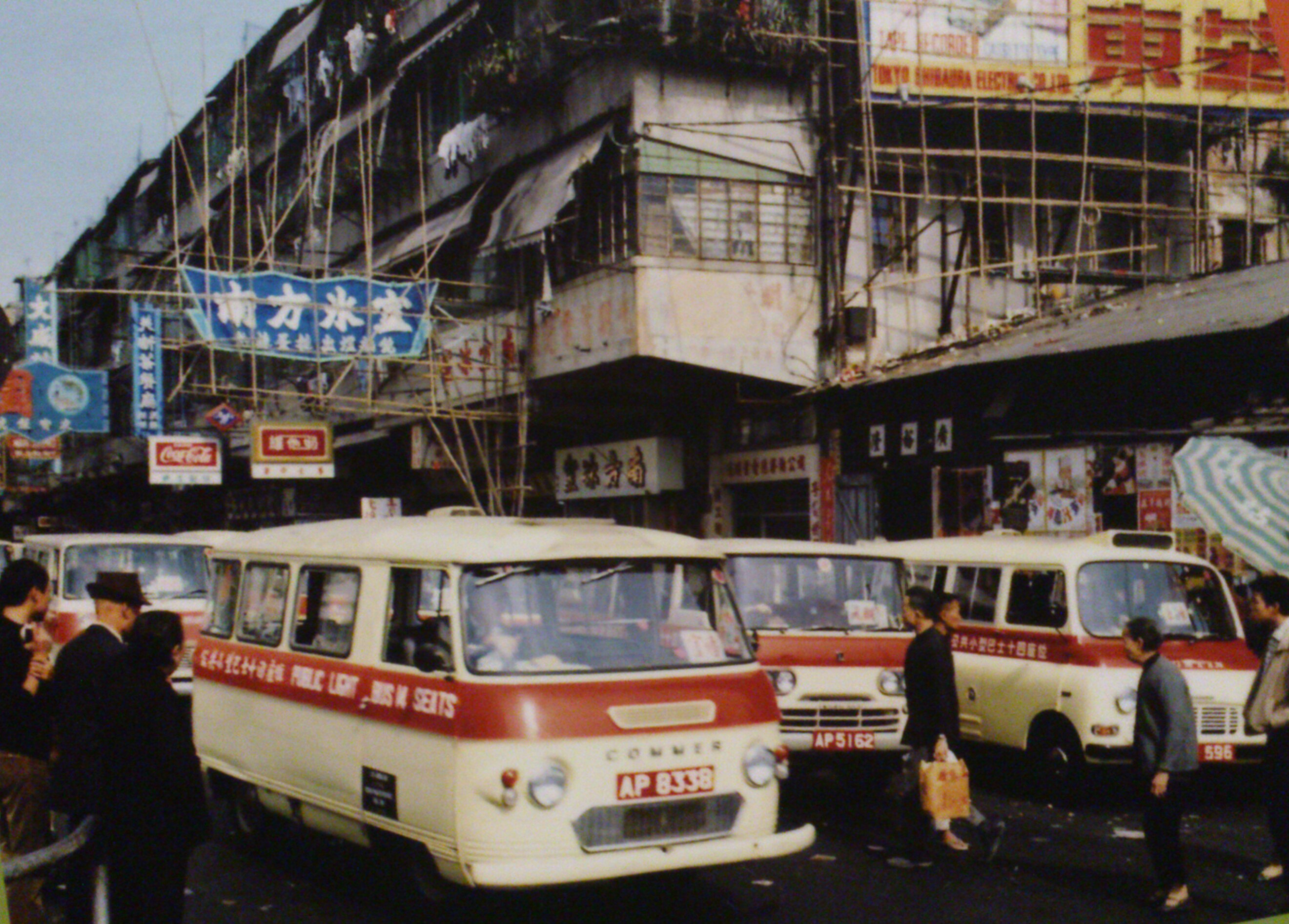
The earliest public light buses. At the front are (left to right) Commer, Isuzu Elf and Morris

Most early public light buses used mostly British vehicles and carried few passengers as they were vans converted as buses. A few non-British European buses emerged but Japanese minibuses appeared in 1969 and finally dominated the fleet by the 1980s.

- Morris J Type 12 seater – 1960s
- Bedford CA – 1960s
- Ford Transit Mk I (1965–1978) 9 and 12 seaters – 1970s
- Nissan Echo (all retired and replaced by Civilian in the 1980s)
- Mitsubishi Fuso Rosa (Currently only Green Minibus)
- Toyota Coaster (both LPG and diesel)
- Nissan Civilian (all retired 1990s)
- Mercedes-Benz Sprinter 311 (all retired)
- Mercedes-Benz Sprinter 516CDi
- Iveco Daily (one introduced in 2004 but already retired)
- GMI Gemini (diesel-electric)
- Golden Dragon XML6701J18
- Optare Solo SR
- Fiat Ducato
- Mellor Orion
- MAN TGE 5.180

== Possible new fleet ==
Some Green Minibus Unions have called for the Government to provide a new fleet of buses which can hold up to 20 people, one more person than the current 19 people. They say it could help ease traffic congestion during rush hour and possibly push up profits which may turn away possible fare increases. There are a few of the new buses in service at the moment, but because it is only legal to have 16 passengers in a minibus, the extra area is used as a luggage rack. The Government has responded saying that it would be prudent to first study the implications of such expansion in the context of a Public Transport Strategy Study first, which should take two years ending in 2017 or 2018.

== Cultural references ==
In the film Lost In Time, Cecilia Cheung played the role as a red minibus driver and won the "Best Actress" award in the 2004 Hong Kong Film Awards.

== See also ==
- Bus services in Hong Kong
- Dollar vans in the New York metropolitan area, an informal network of minibuses and vans with a service quality and history similar to Hong Kong minibuses
- Marshrutka
- Share taxi, for more international equivalents to public light buses
- Transport in Hong Kong
- Van
