= Second Time Around (film) =

2002 Hong Kong film by Jeffrey Lau

- Film poster
- Directed by: Jeffrey Lau
- Written by: Jeffrey Lau
- Produced by: Johnnie To
- Starring: Ekin Cheng; Cecilia Cheung
- Cinematography: Johnny Koo
- Edited by: Wong Wing-Ming
- Music by: Chiu Tsang-Hei; Anthony Chue
- Production companies: One Hundred Years of Film; Milkyway Image
- Distributed by: China Star Entertainment Group
- Release date: 11 January 2002
- Running time: 99 minutes
- Country: Hong Kong
- Languages: Cantonese; English
- Box office: HK$4 million

Second Time Around (traditional Chinese: 無限復活; simplified Chinese: 无限复活; pinyin: Wúxiàn fùhuó; Cantonese Yale: Mouhaan fukwut) is a 2002 Hong Kong film starring Ekin Cheng, Cecilia Cheung and Ke Huy Quan. The film involves the use of parallel universes.

== Plot ==
Ren Lee (Ekin Cheng) works at a small casino with his best friend Sing Wong (Ke Huy Quan). Ren gets dumped by his pregnant fiancée and asks Sing for money to gamble in Las Vegas, believing himself to have the strongest luck after his fiancée fired a pistol at him and missed all six times.

In Vegas, Sing wanders around the casino while Ren is gambling and offers advice to a young woman that helps her win big. Casino management becomes suspicious of Ren's winnings and send their best dealer, Number One, to deal with him. Ren loses all his money to Number One and leaves the casino with Sing. The young woman who Sing helped win at the casino sees the two leaving and offers them a ride.

Both his best friend and the woman die in a car accident. Ren is the sole survivor. Ren, now pursued by policewoman Tina Chow (Cecilia Cheung), gets into another car accident that causes them to go back in time. Through this process, he not only changes himself and saves his friend's life but also falls in love with Tina.

== Cast ==
- Ekin Cheng as Ren Lee
- Cecilia Cheung as Tina Chow
- Ke Huy Quan as Sing Wong (as Jonathan Ke Quan)
- Annamarie Ameera as Anna
- Oliver Tan as Paul
- John Wang as Det. Luca
- Alexander Fung as Jesus (Number One)
- Johnny Koo as Bobby
- Lynne Langdon as Bo Bo
- Glen Pon as David
- David Quan as Man in Jail

== Awards ==
The film won the Film of Merit prize at the 2003 Hong Kong Film Critics Society Awards.
