= Seoul Raiders =

2005 Hong Kong film by Jingle Ma

- Theatrical release poster
- Traditional Chinese: 韓城攻略
- Simplified Chinese: 韩城攻略
- Hanyu Pinyin: Hàn Chéng Gōng Lüè
- Jyutping: Hon4 Sing4 Gung1 Leuk6
- Directed by: Jingle Ma
- Written by: Jingle Ma; Chung Wai-hung; Eric Lin; Chris Ng
- Produced by: John Chong
- Starring: Tony Leung; Richie Jen; Shu Qi
- Cinematography: Jingle Ma; Chan Kwok-Hung
- Edited by: Kong Chi-leung
- Music by: Tommy Wai
- Production companies: Media Asia Films; Sil-Metropole Organisation
- Distributed by: Media Asia Distribution Ltd.
- Release date: 5 February 2005
- Running time: 95 minutes
- Country: Hong Kong
- Languages: Cantonese; Mandarin; Korean; English
- Box office: HK$7,385,836

Seoul Raiders is a 2005 Hong Kong action film co-written and directed by Jingle Ma and starring Tony Leung Chiu-wai, Richie Jen and Shu Qi. The film is a sequel to the 2000 film Tokyo Raiders.

== Plot ==
Agent Lam teams up with JJ to track a pair of plates used to make counterfeit American dollars. When the plates are captured and make their way to Korea, Lam gets on a plane and searches for the plates in Seoul, tracking a man who he believes to have stolen them. During the hunt, he comes across JJ, who happens be a thief with a hidden agenda. When JJ thinks she has successfully walked away with the plates, she does not realize Lam has preempted her by swapping it with an empty case.

Lam goes to the US Embassy with the plates to claim the $30 million reward offered but is outwitted by a staffer named Owen, who manages to drug him and flee to Korea with the plates. Lam immediately follows Owen to Korea and meets up with a bevy of pretty Korean assistants. When Owen is about to trade the plates with "Black Bear", a top dog of the Korean underworld, Lam and his girls break in to thwart the deal, but Owen escapes with the plates in the nick of time.

Meanwhile, Lam bumps into JJ in Korea, and the pair decide to work together to take back the plates and split the reward. While Owen is immersing himself in a hot spring, Lam sneaks in and snatches the plates. He then uses the plates to lure Owen into his trap, arresting him in the end. Only then does he realize that Owen is in fact a CIA undercover agent. While Lam and Owen reconcile and decide to cooperate to bring down "Black Bear", JJ secretly retrieves the plates from Owen's hiding place but only ends up leading "Black Bear" to the plates and is kidnapped. Lam and Owen has no alternative but to meet "Black Bear" in a deserted sports stadium to settle the deal once and for all.

== Cast ==
- Tony Leung Chiu-wai as Agent Lam
- Richie Jen as Owen
- Shu Qi as JJ
- James Kim as Black Bear

== Reception ==
David Cornelius of DVD Talk rated it 3.5/5 stars and called it a "breezy blend of action and comedy". William Lee of DVD Verdict wrote, "Like a stir-fry of new ingredients combined with leftover ideas, Seoul Raiders is a big serving of entertaining, though forgettable, action-comedy." Derek Elley of Variety compared it negatively to the first film and called it a hastily written sequel that capitalizes on the popularity of Korean culture. Beyond Hollywood called it "popcorn entertainment through and through". Stina Chyn of Film Threat rated it 3/5 stars and called it disappointing except for Tony Leung Chiu-wai's performance.
