= Tiffany Chen =

Hong Kong film producer (born 1959)

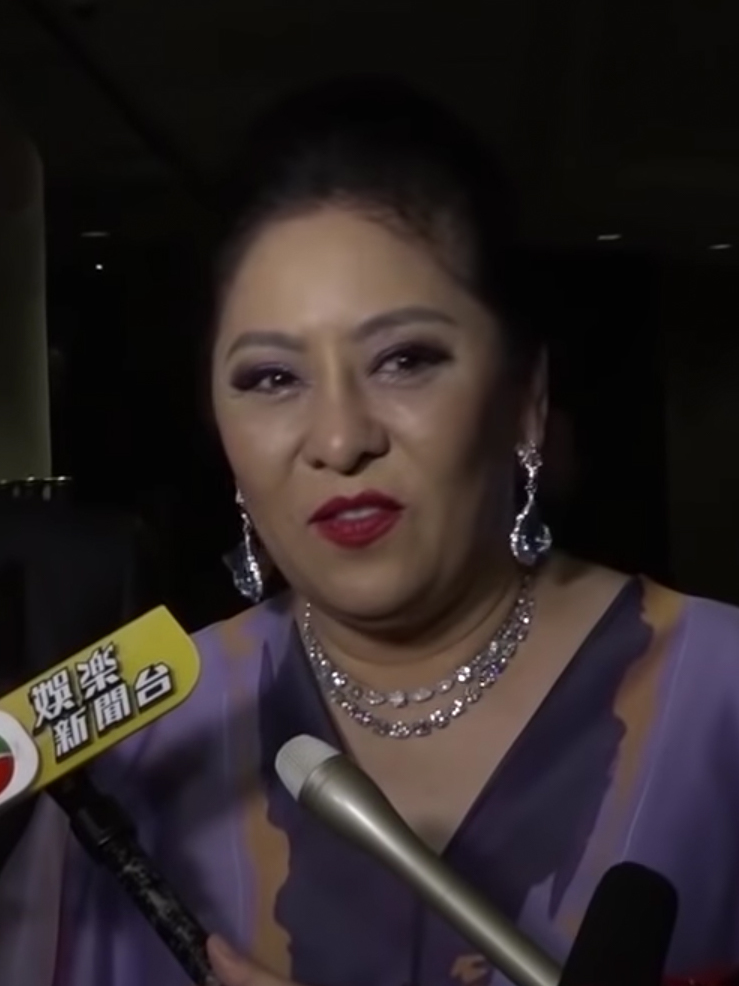
- Chen in 2018
- Born: 陳明英; 20 November 1959 (age 66); Taiwan
- Occupations: Film producer and vice-chairman of China star entertainment ltd
- Spouse(s): Charles Heung (1980-)
- Children: Jacky Heung and Johnathan

Chinese name
- Traditional Chinese: 陳嵐
- Simplified Chinese: 陈岚
Transcriptions
Standard Mandarin
- Hanyu Pinyin: Chén2 Míng4 Yīng1
Yue: Cantonese
- Jyutping: Chan4 Ming2 Ying1

Tiffany Chen Ming-Yin (born November 20, 1959) is a Hong Kong filmmaker and businesswoman. Chen is the second wife of actor-turned-filmmaker Charles Heung, and together they run China Star Entertainment Group.

== Early life ==
Chen was born in Taiwan, with her ancestral home in Heilongjiang. She is the second of five children with an elder brother, who suffered from hepatitis. At the age of six, she was diagnosed with leukemia and recovered after receiving a bone marrow transplant from a suitable donor.

According to Chen, she grew up in a challenging environment with a patriarchal father—whom she discovered at the age of 23 was not her biological father—and a mother with a gambling addiction. She began working in an electronics factory in sixth grade to help fund her brother’s university education. Despite excelling academically and gaining admission to university, Chen stated that her parents sold her to work as a dance hostess for one million NTD. At the age of 18, she attempted suicide while staying at a friend’s home but was rescued after the friend intervened. Chen rebuilt her life by working as a model.

== Career ==
Chen moved to Hong Kong in 1982 after marrying film producer Charles Heung. She became actively involved in the film industry, working alongside Heung who, in 1984, established Win’s Entertainment Ltd, and in 1997, founded China Star Entertainment Group.

In the mid-2010s, Chen drew public attention with her high-profile feuds with Stephen Chow and Cecilia Cheung. She has since transitioned from a behind-the-scenes role to becoming a media celebrity, active in Chinese reality television, e-commerce, and livestreaming.

== Personal life ==
In 1980, Chen married Charles Heung. She has since been popularly known as Mrs. Heung or Madame Heung in the Chinese-speaking world. They have two sons, Johnathan and Jacky Heung. She also has a stepdaughter, Candy Heung, from Heung's first marriage with Betty Ting.

Chen is a vocal supporter of the Chinese Communist Party and a critic of the 2019-2020 Hong Kong protests. In 2022, the Taiwanese government rejected the applications of her husband, Charles Heung, and her son, Jacky Heung, for dependent residency in Taiwan, citing “national security” concerns.
