= 100 Yards =

- Poster
- Directed by: Xu Haofeng; Xu Junfeng
- Written by: Xu Haofeng
- Produced by: Amanda Ho
- Starring: Jacky Heung; Andy On
- Cinematography: Shao Dan
- Edited by: Kong Jinlei
- Music by: An Wei
- Release date: June 2023 (Shanghai)
- Running time: 108 minutes
- Country: China
- Language: Mandarin

100 Yards is a 2023 Chinese action drama film written by Xu Haofeng, directed by Xu Haofeng and Xu Junfeng and starring Jacky Heung and Andy On.

== Cast ==
- Jacky Heung as Shen An
- Andy On as Qi Quan

== Release ==
In August 2023, it was announced that Well Go USA Entertainment acquired North American distribution rights to the film, which had its world premiere at the Shanghai International Film Festival in June 2023. It was released in the United States on November 8, 2024.

== Reception ==
The film has an 81% rating on Rotten Tomatoes based on 16 reviews. Simon Abrams of RogerEbert.com awarded the film three and a half stars out of four. David Ehrlich of IndieWire graded the film a B−.

Andrew Mack of ScreenAnarchy gave the film a positive review, calling it " a jaw-dropping martial arts masterpiece, rife with action, complicated by politics and love."

Richard Kuipers of Variety gave the film a negative review and wrote, "Action fans simply seeking top-drawer wushu combat should be satisfied, but general viewers may grow impatient with a repetitive plot that struggles to deliver compelling human drama from its promising elements."
