= Love Like Pacific Ocean =

Studio album by Richie Jen
- Released: August 28, 1998
- Recorded: 1998
- Genre: Mandopop
- Length: 58:40
- Language: Mandarin
- Label: Rock Records

Richie Jen chronology
Hurt Badly (1997)	Love Like Pacific Ocean (1998)	Richie Jen Best Collection (1999)

Singles from Love Like Pacific Ocean
- 1. "The Sad Pacific" Released: August 28, 1998; 2. "Hey Girl Look Over Here" Released: October 16, 1998

Love Like Pacific Ocean (Chinese: 愛像太平洋; pinyin: Ai Xiang Tai Ping Yang), is the seventh studio album by Taiwanese recording artist Richie Jen. It was released via Rock Records on August 28, 1998. The album spawned the singles "The Sad Pacific" and "Hey Girl Look Over Here". The album sold over 1,200,000 copies in Taiwan, becoming one of the country's best-selling albums of all time.

== Background and release ==
Love Like Pacific Ocean was released through Rock Records on August 28, 1998. It spawned two singles that were promoted by Jen: "The Sad Pacific" and "Hey Girl Look Over Here". The latter track is a cover of Malaysian singer Ah Niu's song of the same name. "Hey Girl Look Over Here" was released as a CD single on October 16, 1998.

== Songs ==
"The Sad Pacific" is a rendition of the song "Sachi", originally penned by musician Miyuki Nakajima for Japanese recording artist Sachiko Kobayashi. Jen's upbringing in a military community became the lyrical inspiration for the song, which aimed to capture the virtues of brotherhood, loyalty, and selflessness. "Hey Girl Look Over Here", originally recorded and composed by Ah Niu, was inspired by a girl who attended an English school across from his own. The song boosted Ah Niu's popularity across Asia following its release in 1997. "Hey Girl Look Over Here" was later covered by Jen and included on Love Like Pacific Ocean.

The album also features "I Am Free", the opening theme for the historical martial arts drama The Return of the Condor Heroes (1998), which Jen himself starred in. Prior to recording the song, composer and musician Johnny Chen invited Jen for a card game. In the aftermath of Jen's defeat, Chen asked him to record the song, channeling a sense of chivalrous yet tender melancholy.

== Commercial performance ==
Love Like Pacific Ocean experienced commercial success upon its release. The album reached number one on the weekly International Federation of the Phonographic Industry (IFPI) Taiwan album chart during the week of September 14, 1998, becoming his first and only number one studio album on the chart, which shut down in 1999. It remained at the top position for two consecutive weeks. The album garnered sales of over 1,200,000 copies in Taiwan and is one of the best-selling albums of all time in the country.

Elsewhere in Asia, Love Like Pacific Ocean reached number seven on the IFPI Hong Kong album chart during the week of October 4, 1998. In Malaysia, the album reached number ten on the RIM album chart during the week of October 13.

== Accolades ==
In 1998, Jen won the Best Male Singer Award in the 5th Global Chinese Music Awards while "Hey Girl Look Over Here" was named one the Top 20 Most Popular Songs of the year.

== Track listing ==
Love Like Pacific Ocean – Disc 1
No.	Title	Length
1.	"Hey Girl Look Over Here" (對面的女孩看過來)	3:09
2.	"Don't Change" (不要變)	3:52
3.	"The Sad Pacific" (傷心太平洋)	4:26
4.	"I'm a Fish" (我是一隻魚)	4:14
5.	"Xin Qing Che Zhan" (心情車站)	5:43
6.	"Storm" (風暴; featuring Angelica Lee)	4:04
7.	"Ai Hen Feng" (愛很瘋)	4:44
8.	"Love Me Love Me" (愛我愛我; featuring Karen Mok)	4:17
9.	"Don't Cry" (別哭 (我想愛的你))	4:01
10.	"Quiet Person" (安靜的人)	5:16
Total length:		43:46

Love Like Pacific Ocean – Disc 2
No.	Title	Length
11.	"Let It Ride" (任逍遙)	4:30
12.	"Too Softhearted" (心太軟)	5:49
13.	"Hurt Badly" (很受傷)	4:35
Total length:		14:54

== Charts ==
=== Weekly charts ===
Chart (1998)	Peak position
Hong Kong Albums (IFPI Hong Kong)	7
Malaysian Albums (RIM)	10
Taiwanese Albums (IFPI Taiwan)	1

=== Year-end charts ===
Chart (1998)	Position
Taiwanese Albums (IFPI Taiwan)	1

== Sales ==
Region	Certification	Certified units/sales
Taiwan	—	1,200,000
