= Lost in Time (2003 film) =

2003 Hong Kong film by Derek Yee

- DVD cover
- Directed by: Derek Yee
- Written by: Jessica Fong; James Yuen
- Produced by: Henry Fong
- Starring: Cecilia Cheung; Lau Ching-Wan; Louis Koo
- Cinematography: Jimmy Wong; Venus Keung
- Edited by: Cheung Ka-fai
- Music by: Peter Kam
- Production companies: One Hundred Years of Film; Sil-Metropole Organisation
- Distributed by: China Star Entertainment Group
- Release date: 20 November 2003
- Running time: 109 minutes
- Country: Hong Kong
- Language: Cantonese
- Box office: $1,986,486

Lost in Time (Chinese: 忘不了) is a 2003 Hong Kong drama film directed by Derek Yee and starring Cecilia Cheung, Lau Ching-Wan and Louis Koo.

== Plot ==
Siu Wai is a young woman whose fiancé has been killed in an accident. She takes on her late fiancé's minibus business in order to support his young son, Lok Lok. As Siu Wai struggles in the cutthroat business, she is befriended by Dai Fai, another minibus driver who was at the scene of her fiancé's accident. Dai Fai takes pity on her plight and he regularly assists Siu Wai, from taking care of Lok Lok to teaching her the ropes of minibus driving.

== Cast ==
- Cecilia Cheung as Siu Wai
- Lau Ching-Wan as Dai Fai
- Louis Koo as Ah Man
- Chan Wai-Man as Uncle Seven
- Paul Chun as Siu Wai's dad
- Daichi Harashima - Lok Lok
- Elena Kong as Sharon, Siu Wai's sister
- Johnny Lu as Sharon's husband
- Lee San-San as Ah Man's ex-wife
- Jamie Luk
- Paw Hee-Ching as Siu Wai's mom
- Edmond So as Elvis

== Awards ==
Awards and nominations
Ceremony	Category	Recipient	Outcome
23rd Hong Kong Film Awards	Best Film	Lost in Time	Nominated
23rd Hong Kong Film Awards	Best Director	Derek Yee	Nominated
23rd Hong Kong Film Awards	Best Actress	Cecilia Cheung Pak-chi	Won
23rd Hong Kong Film Awards	Best Actor	Sean Lau	Nominated
23rd Hong Kong Film Awards	Best Supporting Actress	Nina Paw	Nominated
23rd Hong Kong Film Awards	Best Screenplay	James Yuen, Jessica Fong	Nominated
23rd Hong Kong Film Awards	Best Original Film Score	Peter Kam	Won
23rd Hong Kong Film Awards	Best Original Film Song	Song: Forget the Unforgettable Composer: Peter Kam; Lyricist: Chan Fai Young; Singer: Cecilia Cheung	Nominated
