= A Fistful of Stances =

Hong Kong TV drama

- Official poster
- 鐵馬尋橋
- Genre: Costume drama Martial arts
- Created by: Lee Tim-shing
- Written by: Cheung Wah Biu; Chan Ching Yee
- Starring: Kevin Cheng; Tavia Yeung; Kenneth Ma; Yuen Qiu; Shirley Yeung; Selena Lee; Natalie Tong; Nancy Wu; Dominic Lam; Jacky Heung; Chung King-fai; Kara Hui
- Theme music composer: Yip Kai Chung; Tang Chi Wai
- Opening theme: "Thinking Under the Snow" (雪下思) by Kevin Cheng
- Country of origin: Hong Kong
- Original language: Cantonese
- No. of episodes: 24 (Hong Kong); 25

Production
- Executive producer: Lee Tim-shing
- Production location: Hong Kong
- Camera setup: Multi camera
- Running time: 42 – 45 minutes
- Production company: TVB

Original release
- Network: TVB Jade
- Release: March 17 – April 18, 2010

A Fistful of Stances
- Title screen shot
- Traditional Chinese: 鐵馬尋橋
- Simplified Chinese: 铁马寻桥
Transcriptions
Standard Mandarin
- Hanyu Pinyin: Tiě Mǎ Xún Qiáo
Yue: Cantonese
- Jyutping: Tit3 Ma5 Cam4 Kiu4

A Fistful of Stances (Chinese: 鐵馬尋橋) is a 2010 TVB television drama from Hong Kong produced and created by Lee Tim-shing. The Chinese title, literally meaning "Iron Horse Seeks Bridge," defines a person who is able to finally use his high potential to learn powerful techniques.

== Synopsis ==
Au-Yeung Wai-Lan (Yuen Qiu), owner of a martial arts training school, is reunited with her long-lost son Ku Yu Cheung (Kevin Cheng) after years of agonizing separation. On his return home, Yu-Cheung is shocked to find that his younger brother Koo Yu-Tong (Kenneth Ma) has been critically ill and that his father was murdered long ago by Wing Tak (Dominic Lam), the existing director of a pharmaceutical company and a bitter old foe of the Koos.

Pinning all the family hope on Yu-Cheung, he later learns a special set of kung fu skills, and register for the Seven States Martial Arts Championship Tournament. Out of the blue, Yu-Cheung's opponent in the final turns out to be Wing Man-Kwan (Jacky Heung).

After the tournament, Yu-Cheung and his family found evidence to prove to everyone that Wing Tak is guilty. Wing Tak began to use cruel ways again to save himself.

== Cast ==
Ku family

Cast	Role	Description
Chung King-fai	Au-Yeung Biu 歐陽彪	Au-Yeung Wai-lan's father Ku Kin-shing's father-in-law Killed by Wing-Tak
Eileen Yeow	Hau Ho-Fa 侯荷花	Au-Yeung Wai-lan's stepmother Au-Yeung Biu's 2nd Wife Killed by Wing-Tak (Semi-Villain)
Tavia Yeung	Au-Yeung Wai-Lan 歐陽惠蘭	Mother of Ku Yue-chang, Ku Yue-tong, Ku Yue-yan, Ku Man-kuen, Ku Yue-leung
Yuen Qiu	Au-Yeung Wai-Lan 歐陽惠蘭	Mother of Ku Yue-chang, Ku Yue-tong, Ku Yue-yan, Ku Man-kuen, Ku Yue-leung
Kevin Cheng	Ku Kin-Shing 顧堅誠	Au-Yeung Wai-Lan's husband Father of Ku Yue-Cheung, Ku Yue-Tong, Ku Yue-yan, Ku Man-kuen, Ku Yue-Leung and Ying Ngan-Ming; Killed by Wing-Tak, witnessed by Au-Yeung Biu's apprentice, Pai Jeung (排 長)
Kevin Cheng	Ku Yu Cheung 顧汝章	Previous identity was Law Siu Dong (羅小冬); Au-Yeung Wai-Lan and Ku Kin-shing's long lost son and first child Love triangle with Ying Ngan-Ming and Chow Bing-Bing; Wing Tak's sworn enemy Chow Bing Bing' ex-boyfriend Ying Ngan-Ming's love interest
Kenneth Ma	Ku Yu-Tong 顧汝棠	Au-Yeung Wai Lan's Second Child; Had Asthma from the age of 19; Wing Tak's sworn enemy
Stephen Wong Ka-Lok	Ku Yu-Yan 顧汝仁	Love triangle with Ku Yue-leung and Wing Tsz-Yau; Au-Yeung Wai Lan's Third Child
Shirley Yeung	Ku Man-Kuen 顧文娟	Au-Yeung Wai Lan's Fourth Child elder twin sister of Ku Yue-leung; Ho Ho-yin's ex-girlfriend
Alex Lam (林子善)	Ku Yu-Leung 顧汝良	Love triangle with Ku Yue-yan and Wing Tsz-Yau; Au-Yeung Wai Lan's Fifth Child; Twins younger brother of Ku Man-kuen
Natalie Tong	Ying Ngan-Ming 應雁鳴	Love triangle with Chow Bing-bing and Ku Yu-cheung; Au-Yeung Wai Lan's Adopted Child; Was raped by Tam Chung; Likes Ku Yue-Cheung
Lee Shing-Cheung	Au-Yeung Cheung 歐陽昌	Au-Yeung Wai-Lan's brother

Chow family

Cast	Role	Description
Ram Chiang	Leung Cham 梁湛	Master/Mentor of Ku Yue-Cheung; Chow Fong Fong's husband
Angela Tong	Chow Fong-fong 周芳芳	Chow Bing-bing's older sister Leung Cham's wife (Semi-Villain)
Nancy Wu	Chow Bing-bing 周冰冰	Introduced in Ep.16; Love triangle with Ying Ngan-Ming and Ku Yue-cheung; Chow Fong-fong's younger sister Kwan Hung's ex-wife Ku Yue-cheung's ex-girlfriend (Villain)

Wing family

Cast	Role	Description
Dominic Lam	Wing Tak 榮 德	Killed Au-Yeung Biu, Hau Ho-fa and Koo Kin-shing (Main Villain)
Kara Hui	Cheung Sheung-chu 蔣上珠	Wing tak's wife Shot Koo Kin-shing and injured him (Semi-Villain)
Selena Lee	Wing Tsz-ching 榮芷晴	Doctor; Wing Tak's first child
Jacky Heung	Wing Man-kwan 榮萬鈞	Killed Ah Kwong; Wing Tak's second child (Villain)
Angel Chiang (蔣家旻)	Wing Tsz-yau 榮芷悠	Wing Tak's third child Ku Yue Yan's girlfriend

Other cast

Cast	Role	Description
Jack Wu	Ho Ho-yin 何浩然	Ku Man-kuen's ex-boyfriend
Eric Li	Tam Chung 譚忠	Wing Man Kwan's mentor Raped Ying Ngan-Ming (Villain)
Helen Ma	Chan Kiu 陳嬌	Abducted Ku Yu-cheung and attempted to abduct Ku Yu-tong
Lily Li	Aunt 12 十二嬸	Helped Cheung Sheung-chu frame Tam Chung

== Awards and nominations ==
TVB Anniversary Awards (2010)

- Nominated: Best Drama
- Nominated: Best Actor (Kevin Cheng)
- Nominated: Best Supporting Actor (Dominic Lam) Top 5
- Nominated: Best Supporting Actress (Angela Tong)
- Nominated: Best Supporting Actress (Kara Hui)
- Nominated: Best Supporting Actress (Selena Lee)
- Nominated: My Favourite Male Character (Kenneth Ma) Top 5
- Nominated: Most Improved Actor (Alex Lam)
- Nominated: Most Improved Actress (Selena Li)
- Won: Most Improved Actress (Natalie Tong)

== Viewership ratings ==
	Week	Episodes	Average Points	Peaking Points	References
1	March 17–19, 2010	1 — 3	28	30	
2	March 22–26, 2010	4 — 8	29	—	
3	March 29 - April 2, 2010	9 — 13	30	32	
4	April 5–9, 2010	14 — 18	31	33	
5	April 12–16, 2010	19 — 23	32	—	
5	April 18, 2010	24 — 25	37	43	
