= Jacky Heung =

Hong Kong actor (born 1984)

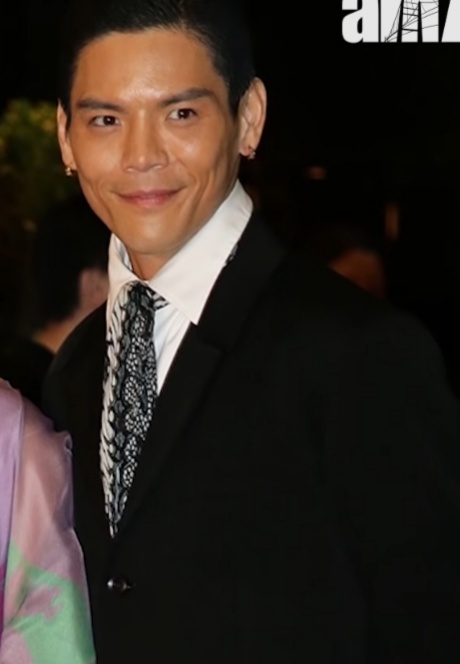
- Heung in December 2018
- Born: Heung Chin-ping (向展平); 20 July 1984 (age 42); British Hong Kong
- Occupation: Actor
- Spouse: Bea Hayden (m. 2019)
- Children: 2
- Parents: Charles Heung (father); Tiffany Chen (mother)

Jacky Heung Cho (Chinese: 向佐; born 20 July 1984) is a Hong Kong actor. He is the elder son of film producer/presenter Charles Heung and his wife Tiffany Chen.

== Personal life ==
In December 2020, Heung applied for permanent residence in Taiwan; his application was denied in February 2021 on the basis of "danger of threatening national interest, public safety, or public order or engaging in terrorist activities." Additionally, Heung was reported by Taiwanese media to be a member of the pro-communist All-China Youth Federation.

== Filmography ==
Filmography
Year	Title	Role	Notes/Ref.
2006	Fearless	Master Tai's godson	
2007	The Warlords	thief	
2008	Fatal Move	Kwok Chi-hang	
2009	Push	Pop Boy #2	
2009	Poker King	David Lin	
2010	True Legend	General	
2010	72 Tenants of Prosperity	Mobile phone salesman	
2010	Ex		
2010	A Fistful of Stances	Wing Man-kwan	Television series
2010	Lover's Discourse	Paul	
2011	4 in Love	Leung Po-ching	
2016	From Vegas to Macau III	Lung Sap-ng	
2016	League of Gods	Leizhenzi	
2017	Dragon Force		
2017	GSD		
2019	The Principle	Jingzhe	
2023	100 Yards	Shen An	
TBA	Caine	TBA	
