= Lavender (2000 film) =

2000 Hong Kong film by Riley Yip

- Lavender theatrical poster
- Traditional Chinese: 薰衣草
- Simplified Chinese: 薰衣草
- Jyutping: Fan Yi Cho
- Directed by: Riley Yip Kam-Hung
- Written by: Riley Yip Kam-Hung
- Produced by: Claudie Chung Chun
- Starring: Takeshi Kaneshiro; Kelly Chen; Eason Chan
- Cinematography: Kwan Pun-Leung
- Edited by: Maurice Li Ming-Wen
- Music by: Ronald Ng Luk-Sing
- Production companies: Golden Harvest (China) Company Limited; GH Pictures; United Filmmakers Organization (UFO)
- Distributed by: Golden Harvest Company; Golden Village; Warner Bros.
- Release date: 22 December 2000
- Running time: 111 minutes
- Country: Hong Kong
- Language: Cantonese
- Box office: HK$14,554,221

Lavender (Chinese: 薰衣草; Jyutping: Fan Yi Cho) is a 2000 Hong Kong romantic film written and directed by Riley Yip Kam-Hung. The film stars Taiwanese actor singer Takeshi Kaneshiro, Hong Kong actress singer Kelly Chen and actor singer Eason Chan. The title of the film is derived from Athena's (Kelly Chen) deceased boyfriend's favorite scent, which was lavender. The film is the third collaboration between Kaneshiro and Chen, the two previously co-starred together in 1996 Lost and Found and 1998 Anna Magdalena.

== Plot ==
A young woman's life is changed when an angel with a broken wing lands on her balcony.

Athena (Kelly Chen) is an aroma therapy teacher and scent shop owner. She is lonely and depressed, her life is empty, she desperately longs and misses her deceased boyfriend Andrew. Each day she purchases a helium balloon, writes a message on it and releases it to the skies hoping it will reach Andrew. The days and nights come and go without much surprises until one night when an angel named Angel (Takeshi Kaneshiro) crashes into her apartment balcony. At first she thinks he is a burglar until he explains to her that he is an injured angel who can't return to heaven until the Holy Door is opened plus he must gather love to be able to fly again. She lets him stay at her place until he can return to heaven but he must be her servant to repay for staying at her home. He tells her he won't be much of an bother since he doesn't consume human food as he only survives on humans giving him love.

While returning home from one of their shopping errands together they both run into Athena's nosy gay next door neighbor Chow Chow (Eason Chan). Chow Chow is immediately smitten with Angel and falls in love with him at first sight. That night Chow Chow invites himself and his dog (also named Chow Chow) who happens to be a Chow Chow breed over to Athena's place to chit chat with Angel. While talking to Chow Chow, Angel learns more about Athena and Chow Chow's connection to Athena. Athena's deceased boyfriend Andrew was also Chow Chow's childhood friend whom Chow Chow was in love with, in order to be near Andrew, Chow Chow decided to move across the hall from Athena's. Angel also finds out that Andrew was an SDU team officer who had dead suddenly of heat stroke one day during a typical training day and that Athena has never really gotten over his death.

Angel and Chow Chow become fast friends. Every night Chow Chow brings Angel out clubbing with him, where Angel receives loves and money from women he dances for. Angel uses the money he earns to buy many pairs of shoes. When Athena asks him why he has brought so many pairs of shoes he tells her because heaven doesn't have shoes. Even with his newly purchased many pairs of shoes Angel still prefers to wear the old laced up boots Athena gave him. Athena does not approve of Angel and Chow Chow's newfound friendship and tells Angel not to associate with Chow Chow anymore as she sees Chow Chow as a bad influence.

Seeing how Athena has never gotten over Andrew he tries to help her move on with Chow Chow's help. They decide to have a single guy party at her house to set her up with someone. She is furious with their party and retaliates by throwing out all the guests' shoes. Soon Angel finds out his favorite pair of shoes was also thrown out, he leaves Athena's house for days in search of his lost shoes. Athena and Chow Chow get into a heated argument about Athena's actions causing Angel to leave, both realize Angel's place in their heart and separately heads out in search of him. Athena finds an ecstatic Angel soaking wet in the pouring as he has found his missing shoes. They head back to Athena's home and have a heartfelt conversation.

The next day Athena and Angel head out to somewhere in Europe to prepare for Angel's return to heaven. Athena packs all of Andrew's stuff for Angel to bring to Andrew in heaven. They visit a lavender field to pick up a lavender bouquet to also bring to Andrew since that was his favorite scent when he was alive. The two later take a train to head to the Holy Door location. While on the train Athena and Angel make love so Angel will have the strength to fly back to heaven. Both snuggle each other after their intimate day waiting for the Holy Door to open, once it opens Angel flies out the train window and return to heaven. Parting with Angel helps Athena to finally have closure of her relationship with Andrew.

Time passes and Athena is back on his Hong Kong inside her apartment. She hears a loud fall and goes in investigate to find a man in white coveralls wearing the same boots as Angel fallen on the balcony. The man in coveralls looks the same as Angel, but introduces himself as Angelo, the restaurant owner downstairs from her apartment.

== Cast ==
- Takeshi Kaneshiro as Angel, Angelo (Restaurant Owner)
- Kelly Chen as Athena Chen
- Eason Chan as Chow Chow
- Cheng Pei-pei as Madame Tung
- Michael Clements as Michael
- Terence Yin as angel playing violin
- Vincent Kok as angel in aroma shop
- Alice Tam as Athena's aroma student
- Audrey Mak as Athena's aroma student
- Poon An-Ying as garbage lady
- Fo Lin as balloon seller
- Ho Chung-Wai as Stella Bar Bartender
- Kung Siu-Ling as Cat
- Vanilla Hung as May
- Howard Cheung as Lion
- Telly Liu as Tiger
- Peter Yip as SDU at party
- Roderick Lam as SDU at party
- Vincent Chik as SDU at party
- Tsang Tsou Choi as Beggar angel

== Production crew ==
- Production Manager: Pang Yau-Fong, Cheung Chin, Dennis Chan Yiu-Wa
- Sound Recording: Teko Leung Chung-Wai
- Art Director: Yee Chung-Man, David Poon Chi-Wai, Pater Wong Bing-Yiu
- Script Supervisor: Kenneth Yuen Kam-Lun
- Lighting: Wong Wai-Chuen
- Makeup: Kwan Lee-Na
- Props: Wong Sai-Kit, Jack Wong Wai-Leung, Bo Wai-Tong, Chan Chun-Ting
- Costume Designer: Elsa Chan Ki-Ling, Dora Ng Lei-Lo, Pater Wong
- Hair Stylist: Samuel Wong Kwok-Hung
- Presenter: Raymond Chow Man-Wai
- Sound Editor: Kinson Tsang King-Cheung, Yuen Teng-Yip
- Assistant Director: Thomas Chow Wai-Kwan, Jo Chan Yuk-Lun

== Awards ==
Year	Ceremony	Category	Result
2001	Hong Kong Film Award	Best Supporting Actor; Eason Chan	Nominated
2001	Hong Kong Film Award	Best Cinematography; Kwan Pun-Leung	Nominated
2001	Hong Kong Film Award	Best Art Direction; Hai Cheung Man, Poon Chi-Wai, Wong Bing-Yiu	Nominated
2001	Hong Kong Film Award	Best Costume Design; Dora Ng	Nominated
2001	Hong Kong Film Award	Best Original Film Score; Ronald Ng	Nominated
2001	Hong Kong Film Award	Best Original Film Song "Lavender" - Music: Ronald Ng, Lyrics: Lam Jik, Performed by: Kelly Chen	Nominated
