= Summer Holiday (2000 film) =

2000 Hong Kong film by Jingle Ma

- Film poster
- Traditional Chinese: 夏日的麼麼茶
- Simplified Chinese: 夏日的么么茶
- Hanyu Pinyin: Xià Rì De Me Me Chá
- Jyutping: Haa6 Jat6 Dik1 Mo1 Mo1 Caa4
- Directed by: Jingle Ma
- Screenplay by: Susan Chan
- Produced by: David Chan; Sasaki Kiyo; Patricia Chong
- Starring: Richie Jen; Sammi Cheng
- Cinematography: Jingle Ma; Chan Kwok-Hung
- Edited by: Kwong Chi-leung
- Music by: Peter Kam
- Production companies: Golden Harvest; Red on Red
- Distributed by: Golden Harvest
- Release date: 10 August 2000
- Running time: 98 minutes
- Countries: Hong Kong; Malaysia
- Language: Cantonese
- Box office: HK$21,336,647

Summer Holiday (夏日的麼麼茶) is a 2000 Hong Kong romantic comedy film directed by Jingle Ma and starring Richie Jen and Sammi Cheng.

The film earned HK$21,336,647 at the Hong Kong box office, becoming the second highest-grossing local film after Needing You... in Hong Kong of 2000. It was nominated in four categories at the 20th Hong Kong Film Awards, including Best cinematography for Chan Kwok-Hung, Best Art Direction for Silver Cheung, Best Original film Score for Peter Kam and Best Original Film Song for Jen, Ah Niu and Michael Wong.

== Cast ==
- Richie Jen as Momocha
- Sammi Cheng as Summer Koo
- Vincent Kok as Summer's boss
- Echo Chen as YoYo
- Ah Niu (Tan Kheng Seong) as Hercules
- Michael Wong as Zeneger
- Tay Ping Hui as George
- Katherine Wang as Yau
- Tam Fung-ling as Daisy
- Chow Siu-yin as Secretary
- Chan Pui-hing as Groom
- Cheung Wai-kuen as Pastor
- Chan Yi-yi as May
- Mak Kwai-yuen as Roger
- Wong Chi-hong as Mr. Chan
- Yu Chung-yik as Tarzan
- Yeung Ying-choi as Snake
- Yip Cho-yau as Elephant
- Ankee Leung as Tarzan's worker
- Yamada Rena as Takagi
- Seung Yik-san as Tommy
- Wyman Yeung as Fake George
- Siu Yee-ting as Tarzan's girlfriend
- Jeffrey Wong as Policeman #1
- Wan Kin-fai as Policeman #2
- Tam Wai-ching as Receptionist
- Chan Wing-chi as Polaris Investment's boss
- Charlie Hau as Polaris Investment's executive
- Ng Suk-sam as Summer's lawyer

== Filming locations ==
The movie was shot primarily in Redang island off the coast of the state of Terengganu, Malaysia
