= Too Softhearted =

Studio album by Richie Jen
- Released: December 24, 1996
- Recorded: 1996
- Genre: Pop; R&B; dance
- Length: 45:18
- Language: Mandarin; English; Spanish
- Label: Rock Records

Richie Jen chronology
I Feel Good! (1996)	Too Softhearted (1996)	Hurt Badly (1997)

Singles from Too Softhearted
- 1. "Too Softhearted" Released: December 24, 1996

Too Softhearted (Chinese: 心太軟; pinyin: Xīn Tài Ruǎn), is the fifth studio album by Taiwanese recording artist Richie Jen, released on December 24, 1996, via Rock Records. The album spawned the titular track as the lead single. Musically, the album incorporates a range of musical styles such as R&B, pop, disco and flamenco.

A major commercial success, Too Softhearted sold over 1 million copies in mainland China and over 2.3 million copies across Asia. It is one of the best-selling albums in China in terms of physical sales. When accounting for unofficial sales of the album, it is claimed that the album sold over 26 million copies in China.

== Background and release ==
Too Softhearted was released through Rock Records on December 24, 1996. Jen had initially decided that he would abandon his career as a singer and pursue a profession in sports journalism if the album did not perform well. This was because it was the last chance given to him by his record company.

The album subsequently saw large amounts of success and won the singer various accolades. The titular single was one of the most popular songs in China following its release and became one of Jen's signature songs.

== Composition ==
The album was recorded at studios in Taipei and Los Angeles. The lyrics of the single "Too Softhearted" depicts Jen's sentiments of heartbreak. It was written and produced by Taiwanese musician Johnny Chen and arranged by Christopher Troy. The track "5151" incorporates free and rhythmic reggae while "I Love You" (Dance version) is characterized as a bouncy funk number. "The Bell Hanging on the Ivy" samples the flamenco dance-pop song "Macarena" (1993) and contains Spanish verses interspersed throughout the track.

== Commercial performance ==
Too Softhearted experienced major commercial success in Asia upon its release. The album is claimed to have sold over 26 million copies in mainland China, making it one of the best-selling albums of all time in the country. However, the lack of official statistics have made authenticating the claim difficult; Jen himself later stated in an interview that legitimate sales of the album stood at over 1 million copies in mainland China, and 2.3 million copies throughout Asia. Initially, the album received lukewarm reception in Taiwan; however, its sales surged following its widespread popularity in China, eventually leading to sales of approximately 600,000 copies in the territory.

== Awards ==
Awards for "Too Softhearted"
Organization	Year	Award	Result	Ref.
Global Chinese Music Awards	1997	Top 20 Chinese Songs	Won	
RTHK Top 10 Gold Songs Awards	1997	Outstanding Mandarin Song (Bronze)	Won	

== Track listing ==
Too Softhearted – Standard edition
No.	Title	Length
1.	"Too Softhearted" (心太軟)	5:50
2.	"5151"	4:39
3.	"Hand in Hand" (浪漫手牽手)	4:28
4.	"Something's Coming" (愛的不輕)	3:30
5.	"I Love You" (Disco version; 我愛你(Disco版))	4:21
6.	"Crying in the Night" (哭個痛快)	4:39
7.	"A Man's Tears" (一個男人的眼淚)	3:50
8.	"The Bell Hanging on the Ivy" (長藤掛銅鈴1997)	3:18
9.	"I Love You" (House version; 我愛你(House版))	6:25
10.	"Fairy Tale" (童話)	4:18
Total length:		45:18

== Charts ==
=== Weekly charts ===
Chart (1996)	Peak position
Taiwanese Albums (IFPI Taiwan)	15

== Sales ==
Region	Certification	Certified units/sales
China	—	1,000,000
Taiwan	—	600,000
Summaries
Asia	—	2,300,000
