= Cecilia Cheung =

Hong Kong actress and singer (born 1980)

- 張栢芝
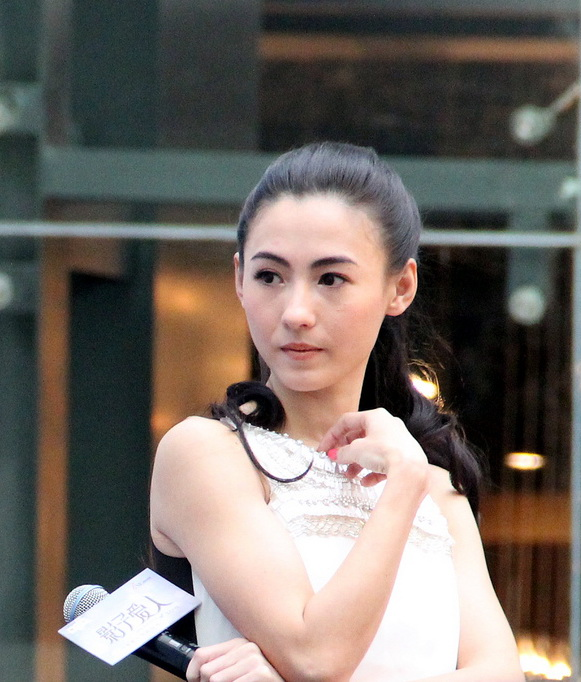
- Cheung in 2012
- Born: Cecilia Cheung Pak-chi; 24 May 1980 (age 46); Yau Ma Tei, Kowloon, British Hong Kong
- Education: Camberwell Girls Grammar School
- Occupations: Actress; singer
- Years active: 1998–present
- Known for: Sing girl
- Notable work: King of Comedy; Fly Me to Polaris; The Lion Roars; Lost in Time; The Promise
- Spouse: Nicholas Tse (m. 2006; div. 2011)
- Children: 3
- Musical career
- Origin: Hong Kong
- Genre: Cantopop
- Instrument: Vocals
- Labels: Universal; Asia; Yowant Network

Chinese name
- Traditional Chinese: 張栢芝
- Simplified Chinese: 张柏芝 (Note: Actually, "栢" is written the same in Traditional and Simplified Chinese. But "栢" is not a Chinese character included in Big5 and Guobiao Code, so it is usually replaced by its variant Chinese character "柏".)
Transcriptions
Standard Mandarin
- Hanyu Pinyin: Zhāng Bózhī
Yue: Cantonese
- Jyutping: Zoeng^{1} Baak^{3}zi^{1}
- Hong Kong Romanisation: Cheung Pak-chi

Cecilia Cheung Pak-chi (Chinese: 張栢芝; born 24 May 1980) is a Hong Kong actress and singer. Cheung rose to fame for her role in King of Comedy (1999), and won the Best Actress at the 23rd Hong Kong Film Awards for her role in Lost in Time (2003). Her other films include Fly Me to Polaris (1999), The Lion Roars (2002), Running on Karma (2003) and The Promise (2005). After her film career declined in the 2010s, she shifted toward Chinese reality television.

== Biography ==
Cheung was born on 24 May 1980 at Man Wah Sun Chuen, Jordan, Hong Kong to Davies Shally, who is of half Chinese and half British descent, and Cheung Yan-yung, a triad member who is also known as Bearded Bravery or Bearded Yung. Her parents divorced when she was nine years old. She was sent to Melbourne to live with her aunt at the age of fourteen and then attended Camberwell Girls Grammar School. She has an elder half-sister, two younger brothers, and a younger half-brother from her father's side.

== Career ==
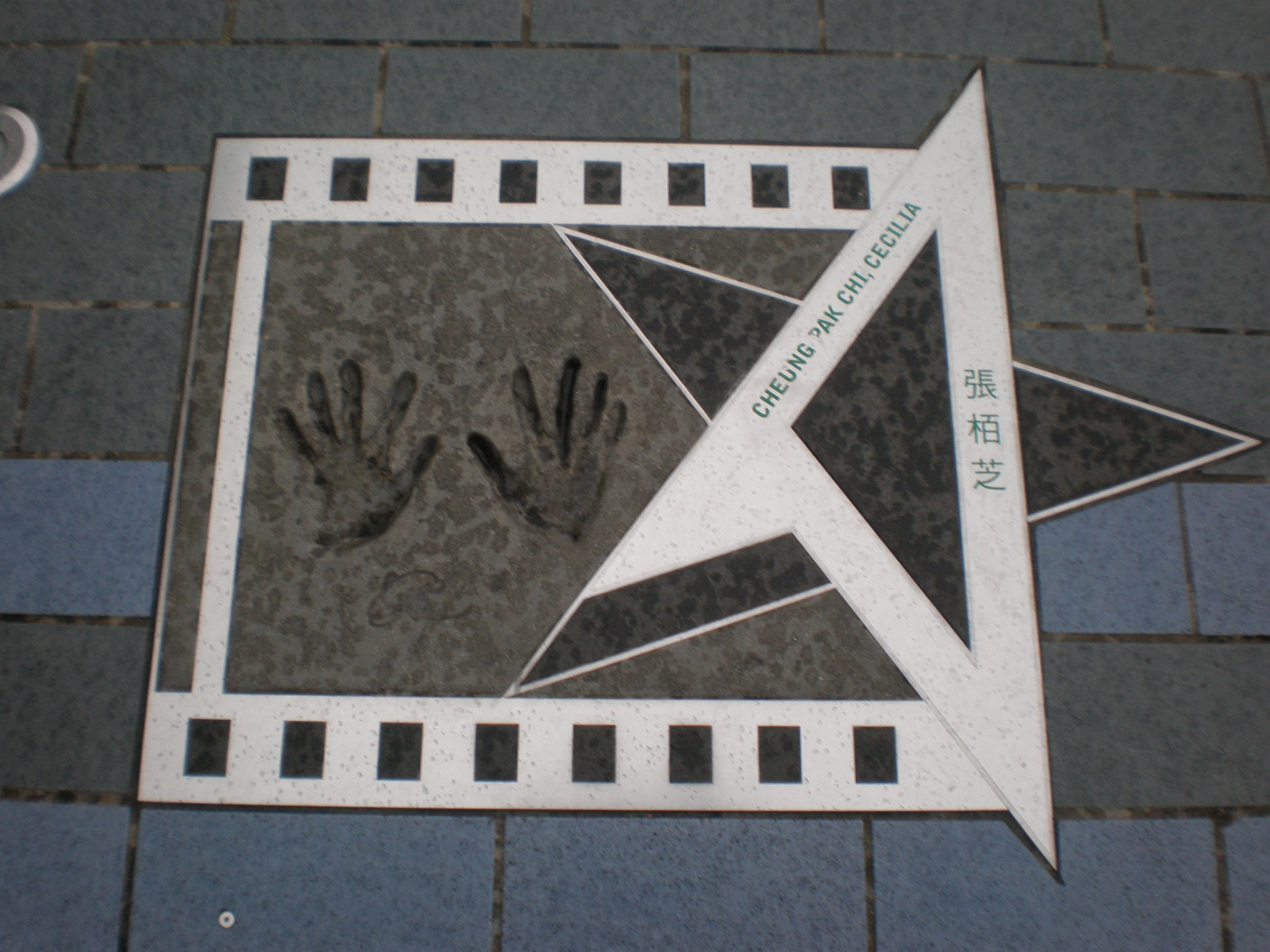
Star, hand prints and autograph of Cecilia Cheung Pak Chi on the Avenue of Stars in Hong Kong.

In 1998, Cheung was cast in a television commercial advertising lemon tea, which caught the attention of Stephen Chow. Cheung made her film debut as a call girl in Chow's King of Comedy (1999), which became the highest grossing local film of the year and shot Cheung to fame. She then starred in Fly Me to Polaris (1999), for which she sang the theme song. She was nominated for Best Newcomer at the 19th Hong Kong Film Awards for both King of Comedy and Fly Me to Polaris, and won for the latter. In the same year, Cheung released her first album Any Weather (1999).

Cheung made inroads into the Korean market with Failan (2001) co-starring Choi Min-shik. The film earned her a nomination at the Grand Bell Awards for Best Actress. She then starred opposite Louis Koo in the comedy film The Lion Roars (2002), for which she won the Most Popular Actress award at the Chinese Film Media Awards.

Cheung reunited with Louis Koo in Derek Yee's film Lost in Time (2003), for which she won the Best Actress award at the Hong Kong Film Awards. She followed with crime thriller One Nite in Mongkok (2004) by Derek Yee, where she played a prostitute who crosses paths with an assassin (played by Daniel Wu). She was nominated for the Best Actress award at the Hong Kong Film Awards for the third time.

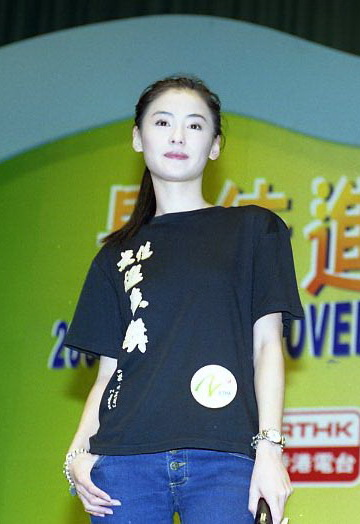
Cheung in 2009

Cheung played old Shanghai diva Zhou Xuan in TV series The Wandering Songstress (2008), after which she took a break from acting and gave birth to two sons. She made a comeback in 2010, but her films were commercially and critically unsuccessful.

In 2013, she announced a one-year break from acting and relocated to Singapore. Since then, Cheung mainly appeared in variety shows in mainland China. She has earned 70 million HKD in 2014, ranking number nine in the top ten list of Hong Kong's highest celebrity incomes in 2014. In 2021, Cheung joined the second season of Chinese reality series Sisters Who Make Waves.

== Personal life ==
Cheung dated Hong Kong star Daniel Chan from 1999 to 2001, after which she was romantically linked to Jordan Chan and Edison Chen. Cheung married Hong Kong star Nicholas Tse in the Philippines in September 2006. She gave birth to their first son in August 2007 and second son in May 2010. The couple divorced in 2011. They agreed to hold joint custody of their two sons. On 18 November 2018, Cheung announced that she had given birth to a third son, but the father of her son remains unknown. In March 2020, Cheung voiced her support for Xinjiang cotton after several international companies announced that they will no longer purchase cotton from the region due to concerns over Uyghur human rights.

== Controversy ==
=== Disputes with Stanley Chu ===
In 1998, Cheung signed a contract with her first manager Stanley Chu Wing-lung, who took 30 percent of her earnings. After King of Comedy (1999), she sought to terminate the deal, leading to a public dispute and lawsuit, during which Chu was attacked by three assailants and hospitalized while Cheung declined to comment over the incident. They reached a settlement in February 2004.

=== Triad threat ===
In 1999, Cheung, then a newcomer actress, was threatened with rape by triad members due to her father's massive debts. The threat was quelled with the help of Tiffany Chen, wife of Charles Heung, after which Cheung joined the couple's China Star Entertainment.

=== Edison Chen photo scandal ===
In January and February 2008, many explicit photos were found online involving Cheung and Edison Chen. The scandal also involved Gillian Chung and Bobo Chan.

=== Disputes with the Heungs ===
In 2006, Cheung's manager Tiffany Chen sought to terminate Cheung's contract with China Star Entertainment in order to urge her to end her relationship with Nicholas Tse; instead, Cheung secretly married Tse in the Philippines. In 2007, Cheung attempted to dissolve her contract and pursued a claim of over HK$15.8 million, but the dispute was settled within a month. In 2015, Charles Heung criticized Cheung's behavior on the set of League of Gods and announced he would no longer work with her, while Chen suggested Cheung seek treatment over her mental issues. In 2016, Chen alleged that Andy Lau had complained about Cheung's unprofessional behavior during the filming of Running on Karma, and further claimed that Cheung prevented Tse's family from seeing their children. In 2019, Chen accused Cheung of pathological lying, suggesting it was a result of her divorce.

=== Disputes with Samuel Yu ===
On 1 June 2024, Cheung's former manager Samuel Yu released the song "In the Name of a Dog", alleging that she had likened herself to a dog to obtain a HK$40 million signing bonus and later failed to fulfill her contract. Cheung's studio denied the claims, stating that Yu had signed contracts without her authorization.

== Filmography ==
Film
Year	English title	Original title	Role	Notes
1999	King of Comedy	喜劇之王	Lau Piu-piu	
1999	Fly Me to Polaris	星願	Autumn Yue	
1999	The Legend of Speed	烈火戰車2極速傳說	Nancy	
2000	Tokyo Raiders	東京攻略	Saori	
2000	Twelve Nights	十二夜	Jeannie	
2000	Help!!!	辣手回春	Dr. Ho Wing-yan	
2001	Wu Yen	鍾無艷	Enchantress / Yin Chun	
2001	Master Q 2001	老夫子2001	Mandy	
2001	Everyday Is Valentine	情迷大話王	Wonderful	
2001	Failan	파이란	Failan	
2001	Shaolin Soccer	少林足球	Dragon Player No. 7	Cameo
2001	Para Para Sakura	芭啦芭啦櫻之花	Yuriko Sakurada / Yuriko's granny	
2001	The Legend of Zu	蜀山傳	Dawn / Enigma	
2002	Second Time Around	無限復活	Tina Chow	
2002	Mighty Baby	絕世好B	Boey	
2002	The Lion Roars	我家有一隻河東獅	Moth Liu	
2003	Love Under the Sun	愛在陽光下		Short film
2003	Cat and Mouse	老鼠愛上貓	Bai Yutang	
2003	Honesty	絕種好男人	Didi Wong	
2003	Running on Karma	大隻佬	Inspector Lee Fung-yee	
2003	Lost in Time	忘不了	Holly Lam	
2004	Fantasia	鬼馬狂想曲	Harmy Bobo	
2004	Sex and the Beauties	性感都市	Yuki Cheung	
2004	Papa Loves You	這個阿爸真爆炸	Customer refused entry to café	Cameo
2004	One Nite in Mongkok	旺角黑夜	Dan Dan	
2004	The White Dragon	小白龍情海翻波	Black Phoenix / White Dragon Jr.	
2005	Himalaya Singh	喜馬拉亞星	Peacock	
2005	The Promise	無極	Qing Cheng	
2006	The Shopaholics	最愛女人購物狂	Fong Fong-fong	
2006	My Kung-Fu Sweetheart	野蠻秘笈	Phoenix	
2006	The 601st Phone Call	第601個電話	Tian You	
2011	All's Well, Ends Well 2011	最強囍事	Claire	
2011	Treasure Hunt	無價之寶	Peggy Jiang	
2011	Legendary Amazons	楊門女將之軍令如山	Mu Guiying	
2011	Speed Angels	極速天使	You Mei	
2011	The Lion Roars 2	河東獅吼2	Wang Yueying	
2011	Dangerous Liaisons	危險關係	Mo Jieyu	
2017	Out of Control	失控·幽靈飛車	Lucy Lin	
TBA	11th Day and One Night	十一天零一夜		

Television
Year	English title	Alternative title	Role	Notes/Ref.
2008	The Wandering Songstress	天涯歌女	Zhou Xuan	
2018	Love Won't Wait	如果，爱	Wan Jialing	

== Discography ==
Year	English Title	Chinese Title
1999	No Matter How The Weather...Cloudy, Rainy Or Sunny (EP)	任何天氣
1999	Destination	
2000	A Brand New Me	不一樣的我
2000	Cecilia Cheung Mandarin Album	張柏芝同名國語專輯
2001	Cecilia Cheung New & Best Collection	張柏芝全新經驗新曲+精選
2001	Party All the Time (Remix Album)	
2001	Brand New Image	最新形象
2002	Real Me	真我
2003	Colour of Lip (New + Best Collection)	至愛唇色(新曲+精選)
2005	C1	

== Awards and nominations ==
Year	Award	Category	Nominated work	Results	Ref.
2000	5th Golden Bauhinia Awards	Best Actress	Fly Me to Polaris	Nominated	
2000	19th Hong Kong Film Awards	Best Actress	Fly Me to Polaris	Nominated	
2000	19th Hong Kong Film Awards	Best New Performer	Fly Me to Polaris	Won	
2000	19th Hong Kong Film Awards	Best New Performer	King of Comedy	Nominated	
2002	39th Grand Bell Awards	Best Actress	Failan	Nominated	
2003	3rd Chinese Film Media Awards	Most Popular Actress (Hong Kong/Taiwan)	The Lion Roars	Won	
2004	23rd Hong Kong Film Awards	Best Actress	Lost in Time	Won	
2004	23rd Hong Kong Film Awards	Best Actress	Running on Karma	Nominated	
2004	10th Hong Kong Film Critics Society Award	Best Actress	Running on Karma	Won	
2004	4th Chinese Film Media Awards	Best Actress (Hong Kong/Taiwan)	Running on Karma	Nominated	
2004	4th Chinese Film Media Awards	Best Actress (Hong Kong/Taiwan)	Lost in Time	Won	
2004	4th Chinese Film Media Awards	Most Popular Actress (Hong Kong/Taiwan)	Running on Karma; Lost in Time	Silver Prize	
2004	9th Golden Bauhinia Awards	Best Actress	Lost in Time	Won	
2005	10th Golden Bauhinia Awards	Best Actress	One Nite in Mongkok	Nominated	
2005	24th Hong Kong Film Awards	Best Actress	One Nite in Mongkok	Nominated	
2005	5th Chinese Film Media Awards	Best Actress (Hong Kong/Taiwan)	One Nite in Mongkok	Nominated	
2006	11th Golden Bauhinia Awards	Best Actress	The Promise	Nominated	
2011	1st LeTV Entertainment Awards	Most Popular Film Actress (Asia Pacific)	—N/a	Won	
2011	1st LeTV Entertainment Awards	Most Commercially Valuable Actress	—N/a	Won	
