= Ah Niu =

Malaysian Chinese singer

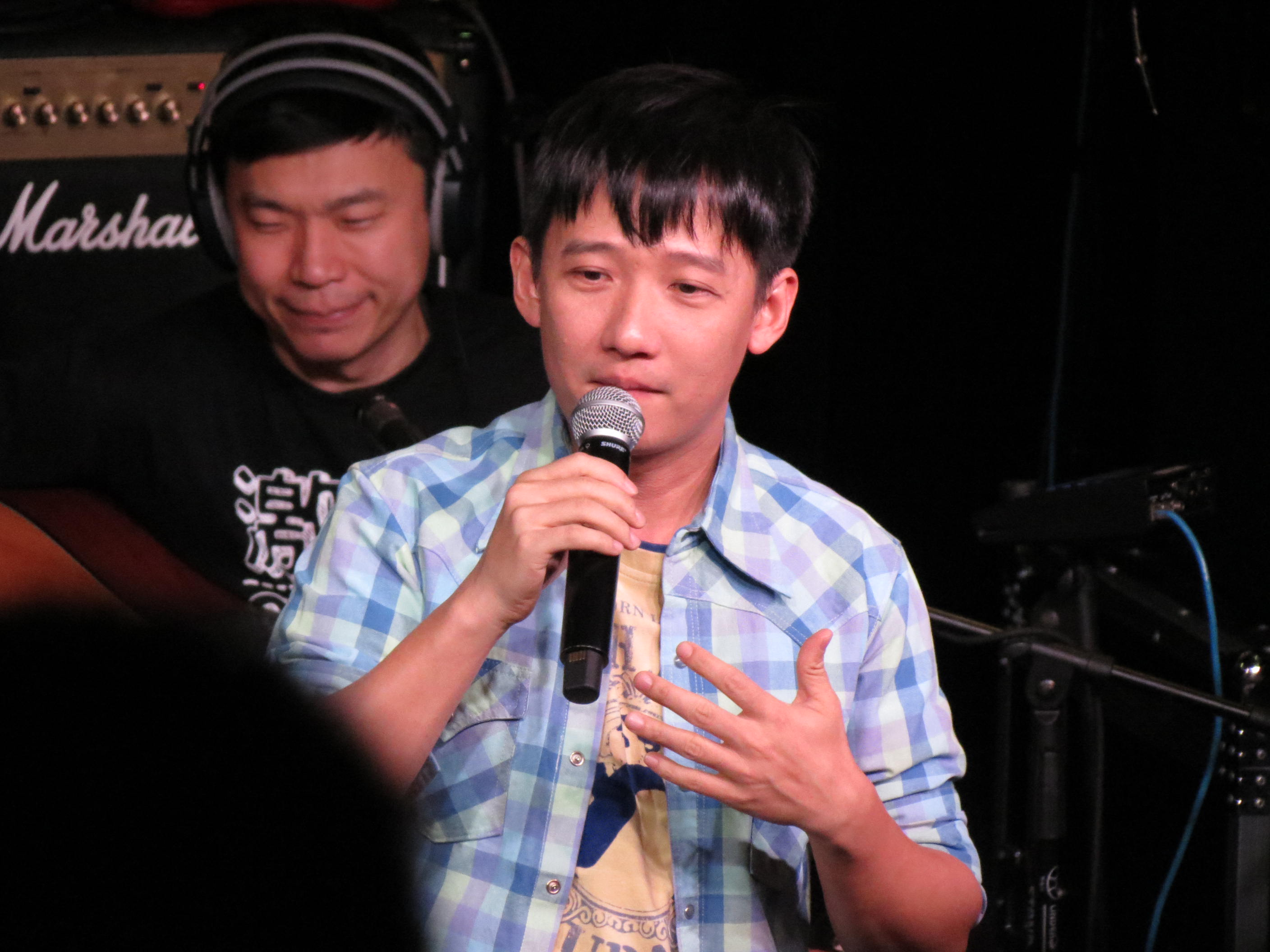
- 2006 promotional photo for 'Peach Blossoms Are Blooming'
- Born: Tan Kheng Seong (simplified Chinese: 陈庆祥; traditional Chinese: 陳慶祥; pinyin: Chén Qìngxiáng; Pe̍h-ōe-jī: Tân Khèng-siông); 31 August 1976 (age 49); Butterworth, Penang, Malaysia
- Occupation(s): Singer, songwriter, actor, director
- Years active: 1997–present
- Musical career
- Also known as: Ah Niu / Ah Gu
- Origin: Malaysia
- Genres: Mandopop
- Instrument: Guitar
- Labels: Gold Typhoon (2014–present) AsiaMuse (2006–2013) Rock Records (1998–2003)
- Website: ah-niu.com

Tan Kheng Seong (陈庆祥; 陳慶祥; Tân Khèng-siông), better known by his stage name Ah Niu or Ah Gu (Chinese: 阿牛; born 31 August 1976), is a Malaysian Chinese singer in Malaysia and Singapore.

In 1997, his popularity was restricted to mainly Malaysia and Singapore, until Richie Jen sung his song (Dui Mian De Nü Hai Kan Guo Lai- "direct translation = Look over here, girl in front of me") which became widely popular.

In December 1998, Rock Records sent Ah Niu to expand his singing career in Taiwan. He quickly gained popularity with the Taiwanese masses with his brand of quirky, folkish songs that mainly focused on his daily life as a kampung boy in Malaysia and unrequited love.

His popularity gained even more momentum when the likes of Rene Liu and Karen Mok requested Ah Niu to compose songs for them which steadfastly placed him as a firm staple not only in Taiwan, but also in China and Hong Kong.

Ah Niu has been a special guest for many concerts around Hong Kong, China and Taiwan. Ah Niu had his first solo concert in Malaysia Genting Highland after 18 years of debut on 28 February 2015 with a total of 5,000 audience and with Richie Jen as the concert's special guest. He also starred in the movie Para Para Sakura by Aaron Kwok in 2001.

He studied in Chung Ling Butterworth High School and majored in film, theatre, and mass communications at the Subang Jaya campus of INTI International College.

== Personal life ==
Ah Niu married a Taiwanese in 2000. The couple had a low-key wedding dinner in Penang, inviting only family members to the reception. His wife gave birth to a baby girl on Valentine's Day the following year. He and his Taiwanese wife divorced several years later.

== Discography ==
=== 《城市蓝天》 City Blue Sky (1997) ===
1. 城市藍天 (City Blue Sky)
2. 踩著三輪車賣菜的老阿伯 (The Old Man Who Sells Vegetables On His Bicycle)
3. 哭 (Cry)
4. 鄉音 (Countryside)
5. 二十歲告白（一） (Confession of a 20 Year-Old Part 1)
6. 阿牛和阿花的故事 (The Story of Ah Niu & Ah Hua)
7. 阿朱小調 (Ah Zhu)
8. 海洋 (The Ocean)
9. Sungai Puyu的風 (The Wind in Sungai Puyu)
10. 二十歲告白（二） (Confession of a 20 Year-Old Part 2)
11. 對面的女孩看過來 (Looky here!)

=== 《唱歌给你听》Sing A Song For You(1998) ===
1. 唱歌给你听 (Sing A Song For You)
2. MAMAK档 (Mamak Stall)
3. 花的语
4. 你没有哭 (You Didn't Cry)
5. Speak My Language
6. 大肚腩 (Pot Belly)
7. 唱给故乡听 (Sing for My Village)
8. 星星亮了 (Stars Shining)
9. 我和我的四个妹妹 (My Four Sisters And I)

=== 《各位男人辛苦晒》(2002) ===
1. 开心又过一日唔开心又过一日
2. 各位男人辛苦晒
3. 失恋好烦
4. 爱你一世
5. 至霖情歌 (Most Romantic Love Song)
6. 仍然在我心内
7. 感情线上
8. 另成一个家
9. 黑超女郎 (Girl With Shades)
10. Hello, Hong Kong

=== 《无尾熊抱抱》(2003) ===
1. 无尾熊抱抱
2. 浪花一朵朵
3. 我是你的小小狗
4. 小强的车
5. 妈妈的爱有多少斤
6. 宝宝
7. 飞
8. 三轮车
9. 妹妹背着洋娃娃
10. 当我们同在一起
11. 丑小鸭
12. 康定情歌
13. 南海姑娘
14. 宝贝不要哭
15. 上辈子欠你
16. 最爱被你管
17. 有缘来作伙
18. 老朋友
19. 这儿是怎样的所在

=== 《桃花朵朵开》Peach Blossoms Are Blooming (2006) ===
1. 用馬來西亞的天氣來說愛你
2. 桃花朵朵開
3. Ms. Cool
4. Say Sorry
5. 我要為你唱首歌 (The Song That I Want to Sing To You)
6. 你不要我了 (You Don't Want Me Anymore)
7. 我在不遠處等你
8. 傻傻的我愛你 (The Crazy Me Who Fell in Love With You)
9. 再見 (Goodbye)
10. 約定

=== 《天天天说爱你》Aku Cinta Pada Mu (2007) ===
1. 天天天说爱你
2. 挂花香
3. 初恋
4. 北京的月亮
5. 冰酒
6. 我爱R&B
7. Monica
8. 王子公主在一起
9. 再见有期
10. 三代

=== 《你最牛》 (2008) ===
1. 你最牛
2. 好朋友
3. 流浪汉
4. 没人爱俱乐部
5. 来我家吃饭
6. 好姑娘
7. 超级喜欢
8. 一点点
9. 按摩
10. 搭台

=== 《光脚丫》BareFoot (2014) ===
1. 光脚丫 (BareFoot Kid)
2. 关怀方式
3. 宝贝我的宝 结婚那件事之后
4. 姑娘姑娘我爱你
5. 心肝宝贝 老牛与嫩草
6. 给从前的爱
7. 小偷 (Thief)
8. 30++
9. 阿公 (Grandpa)
10. Will You Marry Me 结婚那件事

== Filmography ==
- A Journey of Happiness (2019)
- Girls Generation (film) (2016) – Director
- Rembat (2015) – Soo Chin Chye (Lead role)
- Huat Ah! Huat Ah! Huat (2014) – Ah Huat (Lead role)
- The Wedding Diary 2 (2013) – engineer Weijie (Actor only, lead role)
- Conspirators (2013)
- The Raindew Waltz (2012)
- The Golden Couple (2012) – Director
- The Wedding Diary (2012)
- Homecoming (2011)
- Ice Kacang Puppy Love (2010) – Director and actor (Lead role)
- Pleasant Goat and Big Big Wolf: The Super Adventure (2009)
- Hidden Track (2003)
- Para Para Sakura (2001) – Henry Ko
- Take 2 in Life (2001)
- Summer Holiday (2000) – Hercules
- Liang Po Po: The Movie (1999) – Pump attendant
