= Jingle Ma =

Hong Kong writer and director

- Born: 26 February 1957; British Hong Kong
- Occupation: Cinematographer
- Years active: 1984–present

Jingle Ma
- Traditional Chinese: 馬楚成
- Simplified Chinese: 马楚成
Transcriptions
Standard Mandarin
- Hanyu Pinyin: Mǎ Chǔchéng
Yue: Cantonese
- Jyutping: maa5 co2 sing4

Jingle Ma Cho Shing (Chinese: 馬楚成; born 1957) is a Hong Kong–based writer and director, best known for his action films such as Tokyo Raiders (2000) and Seoul Raiders (2005).

== Filmography ==
Year	Title	Role	Notes
1989	Mr. Coconut	Cinematographer	
1993	Fong Sai-yuk	Cinematographer	
1995	Rumble in the Bronx	Cinematographer	
1996	First Strike	Cinematographer	
1998	Hot War	Director	
1999	Fly Me to Polaris	Director	
2000	Summer Holiday	Director	
2000	Tokyo Raiders	Director	
2001	Para Para Sakura	Director	
2004	Silver Hawk	Director	
2005	Seoul Raiders	Director, writer	
2008	The Butterfly Lovers	Director	
2009	Mulan	Director, writer	
2011	Love You You	Director	
2011	Speed Angels	Director	
2016	Three Weddings	Director	
2018	Europe Raiders	Director	
