= Chan Kwok-Hung =

Chan Kwok-Hung (陳國雄, c. 1963 – 17 December 2014) was a Hong Kong cinematographer. His credits, as director of photography or camera operator, included the 2000 action comedy Tokyo Raiders and the 2007 action drama Invisible Target. He was nominated for Best Cinematography at the Hong Kong Film Awards for Fly Me to Polaris in 2000 and Summer Holiday in 2001.

On 17 December 2014 around 3 am, Chan drowned when a motorized sampan he was aboard capsized in Sunny Bay, off Lantau Island in Hong Kong. He and seven others—who all survived—were taking part in a shoot for the Jackie Chan film Skiptrace.
