= Needing You... =

2000 Hong Kong film by Johnnie To and Wai Ka-fai

- Film poster

Chinese name
- Traditional Chinese: 孤男寡女
- Simplified Chinese: 孤男寡女
Transcriptions
Standard Mandarin
- Hanyu Pinyin: Gū Nán Guǎ Nǚ
Yue: Cantonese
- Jyutping: Gu1 Naam4 Gwaa2 Neoi2
- Directed by: Johnnie To; Wai Ka-fai
- Screenplay by: Wai Ka-fai; Yau Nai-hoi
- Story by: Cindy Tang
- Produced by: Johnnie To; Wai Ka-fai
- Starring: Andy Lau; Sammi Cheng
- Cinematography: Cheng Siu-Keung
- Edited by: Law Wing-cheung
- Music by: Cacine Wong
- Production companies: One Hundred Years of Film; Milkyway Image
- Distributed by: China Star Entertainment Group
- Release date: 22 June 2000
- Running time: 101 minutes
- Country: Hong Kong
- Language: Cantonese
- Box office: HK$35,214,661

Needing You... is a 2000 Hong Kong romantic comedy film, produced and directed by Johnnie To and Wai Ka-fai, starring Andy Lau and Sammi Cheng.

Needing You... is the first film produced by One Hundred Years of Film, a subsidiary of China Star Entertainment Group.

== Plot ==
Kinki Kwok (Sammi Cheng) is a somewhat scatter-brained office worker at an electronics firm, who is down on her luck with love. Her boyfriend, Dan (Gabriel Harrison), cheats on her and treats her like a doormat. She is given to fits of pathological cleaning under emotional stress. Her workplace is full of gossip-mongers perpetually looking to shirk work.

Andy Lau plays Andy Cheung, her department manager. A womanizing bachelor who has to fight office politicking at the top, he comes to appreciate Kinki's work ethic and good-naturedness as something of a rarity in the company.

After Kinki helped Andy defuse a sticky work situation, Andy offers to help his subordinate in her private love life. He plots with Kinki to get back at Dan, her philandering boyfriend. In the process, the two realize they may harbor romantic feelings for each other.

Andy's old flame, Fiona (Fiona Leung) attempts to intervene, trying to hook Kinki up with young Internet billionaire Roger (Raymond Wong). Although Kinki does not fancy Roger, she realizes that Andy is showing fits of unease and jealousy that is pleasing her.

== Cast ==
- Andy Lau as Andy Cheung
- Sammi Cheng as Kinki Kwok
- Fiona Leung as Fiona Yu
- Raymond Wong as Roger Young
- Hui Shiu-hung as Ronald
- Florence Kwok as Kitty
- Lam Suet as Martin
- Henry Yu as Roger's father
- Sylvia Lai as Roger's mother
- Gabriel Harrison as Dan
- Andy Tse as Mr. Fu
- May Fu as Grace
- Englie Kwok
- Vanessa Chu as Kinki's sister
- Terence Lam

== Reception ==
=== Box office ===
During the slump in the Hong Kong film industry of the late 1990s, Needing You... raked in HK$6.5 million during its first three days of release in Hong Kong, and amassed a total of HK$35 million in Hong Kong alone, rivaling John Woo's American film Mission: Impossible 2, which screened during the same period in Hong Kong and triumphing all other Hong Kong films screened for the past few years. In the same year, Summer Holiday earned HK$21 million, which was ranked 2nd-best-selling local film after Needing You... in Hong Kong.
