= Rùn (meme) =

Internet slang for emigration from China

Rùn (Chinese: 润; pinyin: rùn; IPA: [ɻwən˥˩]) is a Chinese internet meme that expresses the desire to escape one's current country of residence. Originally meaning "profitable" or "to moisten", the word gained its additional meaning because its romanization resembles the English word "run". It saw a spike in usage due to China's stringent COVID-19 lockdowns in early 2022, which prompted many Chinese citizens to consider emigrating from China.

Rùn has a derivative term: runology or runxue (Chinese: 润学; pinyin: rùn xué), meaning "the study of running away".

As a considerable number of people have engaged in illegal activities, morally objectionable conduct, a failure to integrate into local society, and expressions of hatred toward citizens of their host countries or fellow Chinese after emigrating overseas, their behavior has sparked widespread social controversy and negative repercussions, contributing to the increasingly pejorative connotations of terms such as Runxue and Runren.

== Background ==
Chinese youths have experienced worsening economic prospects and diminishing political freedoms. Besides tang ping, refusing to overwork and leading a laid-back lifestyle, and neijuan, overworking only to achieve marginal gain, a third response is to emigrate from China. This response is termed rùn.

The term started as a means to circumvent censorship and was popular only among minority groups who desire to escape to a country more friendly to them. However, during the 2022 COVID-19 outbreak in Shanghai, the word rùn gained prominence due to stringent lockdown rules and governmental crackdown on personal freedoms. Internet searches for immigration-related inquiries spiked on the first week of 28 March, when Shanghai started its lockdowns. An 3 April announcement that the government will continue its zero-COVID policy led to another spike in search queries. For example, searches for "conditions for immigrating to Canada" increased nearly 30 times. Chinese search engine Baidu has since disabled statistics for immigration-related searches.

Even after the end of the pandemic, emigration continued due to China's high youth unemployment rate and the Chinese economy's struggle to rebound. People's concerns include broader sociopolitical factors, such as governmental crackdowns on large companies and a failing real-estate sector, as well as personal reasons, such as better education for their offspring and better medical care.

Besides economic and political reasons, people have cited societal issues as the reason to rùn. Common issues include:

- Societal and familial expectations to find a job and get married.
- Excessive competition in both the education system and workplace, especially toxic work cultures such as the 996 working hour system.
- LGBT groups unable to reveal their sexual identities in a society less tolerant of their sexual orientation.
- Discrimination against those aged over 35 in the hiring process.
- Gender-based discrimination in work, including widening gender pay gaps and unwillingness to hire women who may need paid maternity leaves.

== Meaning ==
In addition to simply indicating the desire to escape from China, rùn carries additional connotations. Some believe that the goal of rùn is not to seek economic gain, but rather to escape the oppressive political and social climate in China. Juan Zhang wrote that decisions to rùn, born out of the changing circumstances under COVID-19, are often "impetuous" and lack long-term planning. Furthermore, for those who cannot move to a foreign country on a whim, emigration often requires years of preparation and is full of obstacles and uncertainties. Thus, the desire to rùn may be dampened by the amount of effort required to actualize it. Biao Xiang, a researcher at Max Planck Institute for Social Anthropology, noted that rùn is not limited to an expression of escapism. For those who know they cannot leave the country, discussions of emigration convey their criticisms of the present and hopes for a better life.

== Reception ==
Many Chinese youths identify as followers of the runology movement, and the term has become a buzzword online. Discussions of runxue are not censored outright. However, Chinese authorities seem wary of their ideology: some articles on tips about emigration have been blocked and accounts posting them suspended.

Despite the popularity of the movement, Chinese citizens found it more difficult to emigrate during the COVID-19 pandemic. Passports are a prerequisite to leaving China, but the Chinese government stopped issuing and renewing travel documents for non-essential trips since 2020, citing the possibility of returning travelers spreading COVID-19 in China after being infected abroad.

In 2023, emigration resumed after the Chinese government lifted tight border controls. As Chinese citizens find it more difficult to obtain a visa to enter the US, some opted to enter the US illegally through Mexico, a phenomenon known as zouxian (walk route). From January through September 2023, US Border Patrol arrested 22,187 Chinese nationals illegally crossing the US-Mexico border, nearly 13 times the number arrested in the same period in 2022. Asian countries such as Japan, Thailand, and Vietnam also saw a wave of Chinese migrants after the pandemic. The number of such immigrants to the US declined significantly in 2025 during the second presidency of Donald Trump, with only 80 Chinese nationals crossing the border in July 2025.
