= Richie Jen =

Taiwanese singer and actor (born 1966)

- 任賢齊
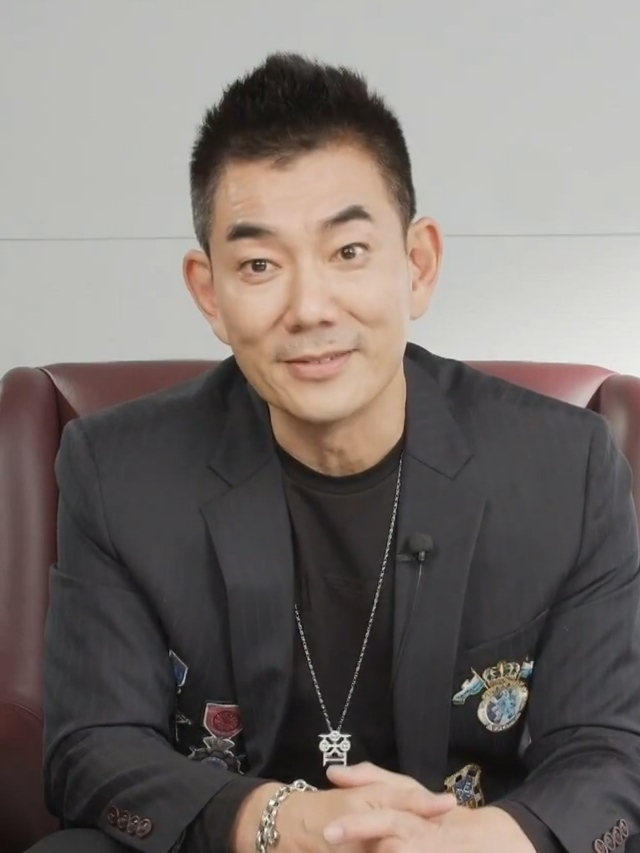
- Jen in 2022
- Born: 23 June 1966 (age 60); Tianzhong, Changhua, Taiwan
- Education: Chinese Culture University (BA)
- Occupations: Actor; singer; songwriter
- Years active: 1990–present
- Children: 2
- Awards: Hong Kong Film Awards 1999 Best Original Film Song – Fly Me to Polaris; Golden Melody Awards Best Video (12th)

Chinese name
- Traditional Chinese: 任賢齊
- Simplified Chinese: 任贤齐
Transcriptions
Standard Mandarin
- Hanyu Pinyin: Rén Xiánqí
- Wade–Giles: Jen Hsien-ch'i
Yue: Cantonese
- Yale Romanization: Yam^{6} Yin^{4}-chai^{4}
- Jyutping: Jam^{6} Jin^{4}-cai^{4}
Southern Min
- Hokkien POJ: Jîm Hiân-chê / Jîm Hiân-chôe
- Musical career
- Origin: Taiwan
- Genres: Mandopop
- Instruments: Vocals; guitar; harmonica
- Labels: Rock Records, Warner Music
- Website: blog.yam.com/msg/richie

Richie Jen Hsien-chi (Chinese: 任賢齊; pinyin: Rén Xiánqí; Pe̍h-ōe-jī: Jîm Hiân-chê, born 23 June 1966), also known as Richie Ren, is a Taiwanese singer and actor. Jen debuted in December 1990 with the studio album Ask Again (再問一次). In 1996, he signed with Rock Records and released the album I Feel Good!. His breakthrough came at the end of 1996 with his fifth studio album, Too Softhearted, which sold over 1,000,000 copies in China and over 2,300,000 copies across Asia. His seventh album, Love Like Pacific Ocean (1998), became one of the best-selling albums of all time in Taiwan with over 1,200,000 copies sold. The record spawned the single "Hey Girl Look Over Here" (對面的女孩看過來), which was named the most popular song of 1998 by Hit FM in Taiwan.

== Early life ==
Jen was born and grew up in Tianzhong Township, Changhua County, Taiwan. He attended Changhua County Tianzhong Senior High School and at the age of 21 he entered Chinese Culture University, majoring in physical education. He also started to work at a musical instrument store while learning how to play guitar.

== Career ==
In 1990, while a senior at CCU, Richie Jen signed a contract with Synco Cultural Corporation and released a compilation album named Towards the Rainbow (奔向彩虹). In December of that year, he released his first solo album Ask Again (再問一次). He released two more albums in 1991, Cold & Tender (冷漠與温柔), and Fly to My Own Sky (飛向自己的天空), before enlisting in the military.

In 1996, he joined Rock Records, and released the album I Feel Good! (依靠), which sold 160,000 copies in Taiwan and was multi-platinum certified. His breakthrough came when the album Too Softhearted (心太軟) was released in December of that year, which sold over 1,000,000 copies in mainland China and 600,000 copies in Taiwan. The title track became largely popular in China and Taiwan.

In August 1998, Jen's album Love Like Pacific Ocean (愛像太平洋) was released. The tracks "Unknown Pleasures" (任逍遥) "The Sad Pacific" (傷心太平洋) from the album were the opening and closing theme songs of the 1998 series The Return of the Condor Heroes, respectively. The record peaked at number one on the IFPI Taiwan album chart and sold over 1,200,000 copies in Taiwan, making it one of the best-selling albums of all time in the country. Jen also starred in the Condor Heroes, playing Yang Guo. In 2005, Jen joined EMI, and his first album from EMI Old Place (老地方) was released a year later. In 2008, Jen signed a contract with East Asia Records (東亞唱片).

== Philanthropy ==
In July 2001, prior to his concert in Shenyang, Jen donated ¥30,000 to a family who was unable to afford heart surgery for their one-year old daughter after learning about their situation through a news report. In May 2023, the same girl and her mother attended Jen's concert in Shenyang and publicly thanked him for his life-saving donation. The woman's expression of gratitude was captured on video and quickly became viral on Weibo.

== Personal life ==
In 2002, Jen married former fashion designer Tina Chen (陳則妤). They have two children together, a daughter and a son. They live in Hong Kong.

== Discography ==
- Ask Again (1990)
- Cold & Tender (1991)
- Fly to My Own Sky (1991)
- I Feel Good! (1996)
- Too Softhearted (1996)
- Hurt Badly (1997)
- Love Like Pacific Ocean (1998)
- Desperate With Love (2000)
- Angel Brother and Hunk (2000)
- A Flying Bird (2001)
- One Richie (2002)
- So Far So Close (2004)
- Old Place (2006)
- If Life's Goin' Without You (2007)
- R.S.V.P (2009)
- Daredevil Spirit (2011)
- On My Way (2023)

== Filmography ==
=== Film ===
Year	English title	Chinese title	Role	Notes
1991	Cops & Robbers	官兵捉強盜		
1993	Top Cool	傲空神鷹-想飛		
1994	No Sir 3	報告班長3	Oi Tak Wah	
1999	Gorgeous	玻璃樽	Long Yi	
1999	A Beautiful New World	美麗新世界	Xiaobai	
1999	Fly Me to Polaris	星願	Onion	
2000	Summer Holiday	夏日的麽麽茶	Mo Mo Cha	
2001	Life Express	生死速遞		
2002	Marry a Rich Man	嫁個有錢人	Christmas Yan	
2002	Summer I Love You	好心相愛	Lek	
2003	Honesty	絕種好男人	Moses Tang	
2003	6th Floor Rear Flat	六樓後座	Policeman	
2004	Silver Hawk	飛鷹	Rich Man	
2004	Elixir of Love	花好月圓	Kai	
2004	20 30 40	20 30 40	Wang	
2004	Breaking News	大事件	Chan Yat Yuen	
2005	Seoul Raiders	韓城攻略	Owen Lee	
2006	2 Become 1	天生一對	Dr. Vincent Cheung	
2006	Exiled	放-逐	Sergeant Chen	
2007	Happy Birthday	生日快樂	Himself	
2007	Contract Lover	合約情人	Fok Kai Fat	
2008	Lady Cop & Papa Crook	大搜查	Gogo	
2009	The Sniper	神槍手	Hartman Fong / Ming	
2009	Accident	意外	Fong Chau	
2010	Fire of Conscience	火龍對決	Inspector Kee	
2010	Flirting Scholar 2	唐伯虎點秋香2		
2010	Adventure of the King	龍鳳店	Zhengde Emperor	
2011	Punished	報應	Chor	
2011	Mayday 3DNA	五月天追夢3DNA		
2011	Life Without Principle	奪命金	Inspector Cheung	
2011	Legendary Amazons	楊門女將之軍令如山	Yang Zongbao	
2011	The Allure Of Tears	傾城之淚		
2012	Scheme With Me	雙城計中計		
2013	Will You Still Love Me Tomorrow?	明天記得愛上我	Weichung	
2015	The Wonderful Wedding	大囍臨門		Cameo
2015	First of May	五月一号	Lin Ke Ming	
2015	All You Need Is Love	落跑吧愛情	Wu	
2016	Trivisa	树大招风	Yip Kwok Foon	
2019	Bodies at Rest	沉默的證人	Santa	
2019	Fagara	花椒之味	Choi Ho-shan	
2019	Where All Roads End	殊途衕歸		
2022	Man on the Edge	邊緣行者	Lok Chi-ming	
2024	Rob N Roll	臨時劫案	Mo Yung Fai	
2024	Twilight of the Warriors: Walled In	九龍城寨之圍城	Chau	
TBA	11th Day and One Night	十一天零一夜		

=== Television series ===
- Midnight Diner 深夜食堂 (2017)
- Infernal Affairs 无间道 (2016)
- Top Gear China 巅峰拍档 (2014–2015)
- Chinese Idol 中国梦之声 (2013–2014)
- Supreme Fate 富豪海灣至尊家緣 (2004)
- The New Adventures of Chor Lau Heung 新楚留香 (2001)
- State of Divinity 笑傲江湖 (2000)
- The Return of the Condor Heroes 神雕俠侶 (1998)
- Taipei Love Story 台北愛情故事 (1996)
- Master Huang 黃飛鴻與十三姨 (1994)
- Dreams Awakening 夢醒時分 (1994)
- Hard To Forget 意難忘 (1992)
- The Orphans 人海孤鴻 (1989)

=== Variety and reality show ===
- Call Me by Fire (season 2) 披荊斬棘 (2022)
