= Tokyo Raiders =

2000 Hong Kong film by Jingle Ma

- Film poster
- Traditional Chinese: 東京攻略
- Simplified Chinese: 东京攻略
- Hanyu Pinyin: Dōng Jīng Gōng Lüè
- Jyutping: Dung1 Ging1 Gung1 Leok6
- Directed by: Jingle Ma
- Written by: Susan Chan; Felix Chong
- Produced by: Raymond Chow
- Starring: Tony Leung; Ekin Cheng; Kelly Chen; Cecilia Cheung
- Cinematography: Jingle Ma; Chan Chi-ying
- Edited by: Kwong Chi-leung
- Music by: Peter Kam
- Distributed by: Golden Harvest Pictures (China) Ltd.
- Release date: January 28, 2000
- Running time: 118 minutes
- Country: Hong Kong
- Languages: Cantonese; Japanese; English
- Box office: HK$28.2 million

Tokyo Raiders is a 2000 Hong Kong action film set in Hong Kong and Tokyo, directed by Jingle Ma and starring Tony Leung Chiu-wai, Ekin Cheng, and Kelly Chen. The success of the film led to the making of its sequel, Seoul Raiders (2005). Notably, the film was the last film to ever be released on LaserDisc, being released in September 2001.

== Plot ==
Macy, the daughter of a Hong Kong banking tycoon, plans to marry her fiancé, Takahashi Yuji, in the United States. However, on the day of their wedding, Takahashi fails to show up. Disappointed and confused, Macy travels to Tokyo in search of him. On the flight, she encounters architect Pat Tai-yung, who designed Takahashi's new home. Claiming he is chasing an unpaid debt, Pat follows Macy to Japan.

To their shock, not only do they fail to find Takahashi in Tokyo, but they also find themselves under attack by yakuza thugs. Fortunately, whenever Macy and Pat find themselves in danger, private detective Lam Kwai-Yan mysteriously appears to save them. Lam later reveals to Macy that Takahashi has been targeted by the yakuza after getting involved with the wife of the powerful crime boss Ito Takeshi.

As the three join forces to search for Takahashi, a critical mistake by Lam puts them on the radar of the yakuza. Faced with an unexpected series of twists, she is left feeling lost, disappointed by Takahashi's apparent betrayal yet still deeply worried for his safety. With no other choice, Macy agrees to cooperate with Lam to track down Takahashi and confront him in person. However, as time passes, she begins to realize that Lam's true identity is not as simple as he claims, and even Pat, who has been by her side all along, seems to have his own hidden motives.

== Cast ==
- Tony Leung Chiu-wai as Detective Lam Kwai-yan
- Ekin Cheng as Pat Tai-yung
- Kelly Chen as Macy
- Cecilia Cheung as Saori
- Toru Nakamura as Takashashi Yuji
- Hiroshi Abe as Ito Takeshi
- Kumiko Endô as Naomi
- Maju Ozawa as Yukiko
- Yûko Moriyama as Miyuku
- Minami Shirakawa as Sayuri
- Takeshi Yamato as Akagawa
- Ko Shibasaki as Yumi

== Reception ==
Derek Elley of Variety wrote that it "makes up in personality and an overall light, jokey tone what it lacks in sheer action smarts." Time Out London wrote, "Made to order for Chinese New Year release, this charmless action-comedy would like to be Charade but hasn't a clue how to handle plot structure, characterisation or secret-identity twists." Keith Phipps of The A.V. Club wrote that it "delivers the mix of humor, action, and style promised, though not delivered, by the big-screen version of Charlie's Angels". Beyond Hollywood wrote, "Aside from an overbearing soundtrack and a hackneyed plot with too many silly twists, Tokyo Raiders is good for a laugh."
