= Fiona Xie =

Singaporean actress (born 1982)

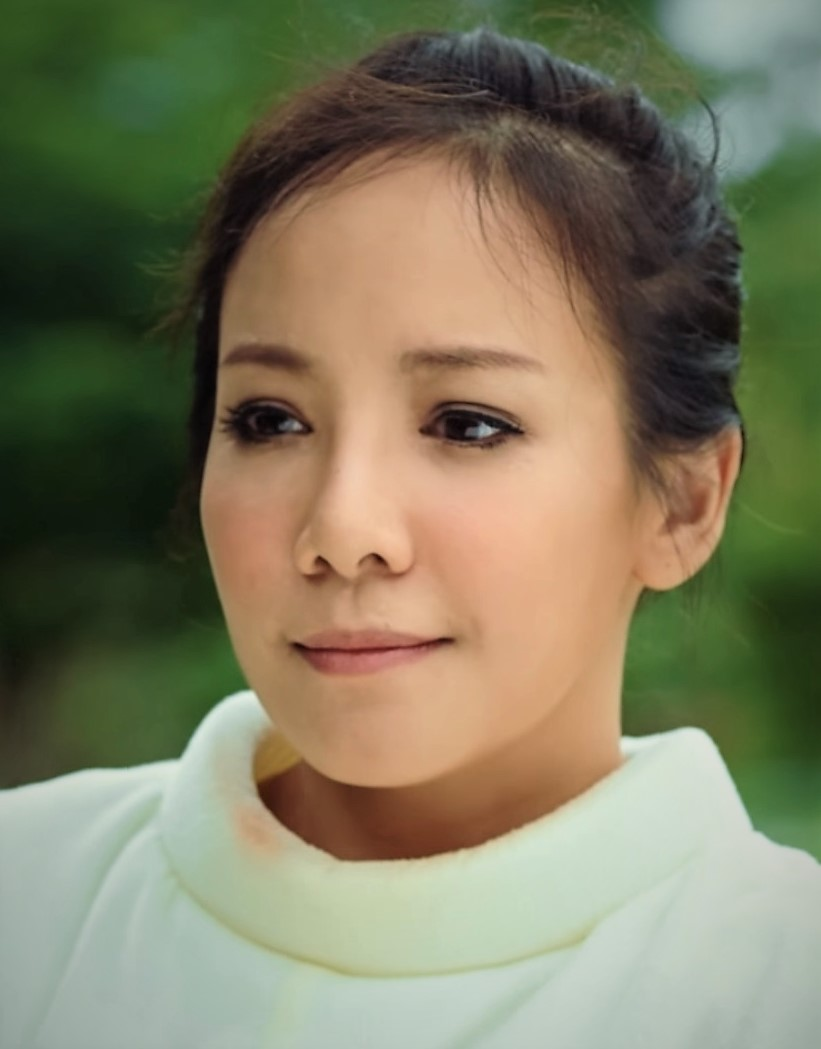
- Xie in "Run Chicken Run"
- Born: 24 January 1982 (age 44); Singapore
- Other name: Xie Wanyu
- Education: St. Hilda's Secondary School
- Alma mater: Temasek Polytechnic
- Occupations: Actress; host; socialite; businesswoman; model
- Years active: 2000–present

Chinese name
- Traditional Chinese: 謝宛諭
- Simplified Chinese: 谢宛谕
- Hanyu Pinyin: Xiè Wǎnyù

Fiona Xie (born 24 January 1982) is a Singaporean actress, television host, socialite and businesswoman. She was named as one of the Seven Princesses of Mediacorp in 2006. She was prominently a full-time Mediacorp artiste from 2001 to 2009.

Xie played Kitty Pong in the 2018 film Crazy Rich Asians. She is slated to play the same role in its sequel China Rich Girlfriend based on the 2015 international best-selling novel of the same name by Kevin Kwan.

== Career ==
Xie was spotted by a talent scout at the age of 15 while studying in St. Hilda's Secondary School. She modelled for numerous print and television commercials in Singapore and Hong Kong before joining MediaCorp as a full-time artiste in 2001.

Xie made her acting debut as a nurse in the Channel 5 drama Growing Up. Her convincing acting landed her one of her most recognisable roles in the Channel 8 sitcom My Genie. She won "Best Newcomer" at the Star Awards 2001 after joining the entertainment industry for just over a year.

Xie later become known for her talents as a bilingual variety show hostess, in particular of the long-running series City Beat. She has since hosted other variety shows, such as the photography-based Say Cheez for Channel 8, and introducing celebrities' favourite hawker foods in Coffee Talk and Hawker Woks for Channel 5. She also hosted the travel show Weekend Escapade together with Ben Yeo.

In 2004, Xie ran with Jeanette Aw, Joyce Chao and Felicia Chin, dressed only in bikinis, along Orchard Road for the Channel 8 drama The Champion.

In 2005, Xie was voted as sexiest woman for the "FHM Top 100 Sexiest Women Singapore" list, even though she had never posed for FHM before. She continued to be ranked among the Top 10 for the FHM lists in the next 3 years.

In 2006, Xie attempted her first villain role as a spoilt diamond heiress in the Channel 8 drama An Enchanted Life, starring alongside Yvonne Lim and Pierre Png. In December 2006, Xie was identified as one of the most promising young actresses in the Singapore entertainment industry by leading local entertainment magazine I-Weekly.

In 2007, Xie took part in the second season of the Singapore edition of Deal or No Deal, where her winnings would go to a selected charity organisation. The episode aired on 22 November 2007.

Xie appeared in her second film project, Rule #1, directed by Kelvin Tong. The film also starred Hong Kong actors Ekin Cheng and Shawn Yue, and debuted in Singapore and Malaysia on 13 March 2008.

Xie starred in a MediaCorp Channel 8 drama Just in Singapore, which was telecast in March 2008. She played a kind-hearted tomboy who sells chicken wings at bazaars and sings getai during the Hungry Ghost Festival.

Xie starred in a Channel 5 sitcom titled Calefare, which starred Gurmit Singh, Benjamin Heng, Mastura Ahmad and Vadi PVSS. She played a calafare (a Singaporean slang term for a background actor or extra) named Joleen Wee, a wannabe singer who actually cannot sing, and often spouts phrases like "eyes wide open", "laugh out loud" and so on.

Xie was originally slated to star in MediaCorp Channel 8's 2009 blockbuster drama, Together. She would have played the second female lead role, one of the meatiest roles that she would have ever received in her career. It was announced on 15 July 2009 that she pulled out of the series due to private matters. This move hogged the news headlines once again, which was perceived to be a sudden disappearance and publicity stunt. Although the exact reason behind her pulling out of the series was never revealed, several colleagues hinted to the media that Xie had expressed discomfort in taking up this role before filming commenced. Eelyn Kok eventually replaced Xie in Together.

Xie went on to play the lead role in her third film Fist of Dragon, also a Singaporean production.

Xie left the entertainment industry in 2009, citing personal reasons. Thereafter she travelled extensively across the globe, living in cities including Hong Kong, New York City, Shanghai and most recently Tokyo. On 2 September 2009, Channel NewsAsia carried news reports that Xie had quit MediaCorp, but this was later disputed by another news article.

On 6 December 2009, Xie was the main feature for top-selling magazines 8 Days and I-weekly. In the interview, she confirmed that she was indeed leaving MediaCorp and revealed her reasons. In an interview with MediaCorp's artiste management unit, the TV station expressed optimism in working with Xie in the future. Her last drama with Mediacorp was Serves You Right!

She then hosted a variety show, Lodge with Me (我行我宿), which aired in May 2010, alongside Felicia Chin, Rui En, and Zhou Ying.

After a 7-year hiatus, she returned to Singapore to film Left Behind, a 2016 MediaCorp series, in which Xie plays a psychiatrist, about which she said the role's tribulations were a personal reflection of her own life in previous years. In various media interviews, Xie was cited as saying she wanted to spend more time with her family, especially with one of her cousins who was critically ill, as one major reason for returning to Singapore.

In 2018, Xie landed a role in the Warner Bros. film Crazy Rich Asians, starring Constance Wu and Henry Golding. The film was her Hollywood debut.

She worked once on both the English-language Channel 5 and Chinese-language Channel 8 and was once popularly referred to as the head princess of the Seven Princesses of Mediacorp because of her immense popularity in the industry with Rui En, Jeanette Aw, Felicia Chin, Jesseca Liu, Joanne Peh & Dawn Yeoh. She also endorsed products such as Gong Cha's juices and OSIM's massage devices.

In 2018, Xie made a comeback on Mandarin television. Xie starred alongside Elvin Ng, Zhang Yaodong, Tong Bingyu, and Dawn Yeoh in Gifted, a crime thriller filmed in Malaysia. She plays an accomplished businesswoman who is also "a very powerful, very scary lady who will go to great lengths to make sure that she gets what she wants".

== Ventures ==
In 2012, Xie helped to launch the Shanghai outlet of local fashion boutique Surrender, where she also spearheaded a collaboration between Japanese accessories brand Ambush and South Korean rapper G-Dragon.

Prior to her stint in Shanghai, Xie had spent a year living in Japan and worked as a producer for Polish documentary filmmaker and photographer Tomasz Gudzowaty.

Xie described herself as an arts lover and had worked with Perrotin, an art gallery, when she was based in Hong Kong.

Xie is one of the investors of Singapore-based F&B start-up Treedots.

== Personal life ==
In February 2017, Xie was reported to be in a relationship with Julien Leo, a model and rapper with local band Kin.

In 2020, Xie revealed in a Channel 8 talk show interview that she left full-time acting in 2009 as she was leaving Singapore with her then-fiance, who did not want her to continue acting. She spent the next few years living in Hong Kong and New York, before breaking up with her fiance following her grandmother's death.

== Filmography ==
=== Film ===
Year	Title	Role	Notes	Ref.
2001	One Leg Kicking	Gwen		
2005	PS. I Luv U			
2008	Rule No. 1	May		
2011	Fist of Dragon	Lily		
2012	The Golden Couple	Jackie Dai		
2018	Crazy Rich Asians	Kitty Pong		
TBA	China Rich Girlfriend	Kitty Pong		

=== Television series ===
Year	Title	Role	Notes	Ref.
2000	Growing Up	Shirley Ho		
2000	A War Diary	Rita		
2000	Phua Chu Kang Pte Ltd	Mrs Lopez		
2001	The Hotel	Fiona		
2001	My Genie 我爱精灵	Genie 0385985 / Wenzi		
2002	My Genie 2 我爱精灵2	Genie 0385985 / Wenzi		
2003	Home in Toa Payoh	Yuan Shuhuai		
2004	The Champion	Lu Kaixin		
2004	Room in My Heart	Happy		
2005	Love Concierge 爱的掌门人	Jiang Ruxin		
2006	An Enchanted Life	Zhang Meiya		
2006–2007	Maggi & Me	Maggi		
2007	Happily Ever After	Lu Yue / Chang'er		
2008	Sense of Home: Shanghai	Linda		
2008	Calefare	Joleen Wee		
2008	Just in Singapore	Lin Xiuming		
2009	Serves You Right!	Faith Foo Li		
2016	Left Behind	Jennifer Leong		
2018	No Catalogue	Dominic		
2018	Gifted	Ma Xinrou		

=== Variety and reality show ===
Year	Title	Role	Notes	Ref.
2001	PSC Night (普威之夜)	Co-host		
2001	City Beat (城人杂志)	Co-host		
2002	City Beat (城人杂志)	Co-host		
2002	Innocent Moments (小小儿戏)	Host		
2003	City Beat (城人杂志)	Co-host		
2005	Pretty Woman (想·得·美)	Host		
2005	Say Cheez (好摄2人组)	Host		
2005	Coffee Talk and Hawker Woks	Host		
2006	Insiders' Australia (动感澳游)	Host		
2006	Weekend Escapade (周末万岁)	Host		
2006	Coffee Talk and Hawker Woks 2	Host		
2006	Coffee Talk and Hawker Woks 3	Host		
2007	Hey! Gorgeous (校花校草追赶跑)	Host		
2007	Seemingly Singapore (风行一时代)	Host		
2007	Campus Superstar (校园SuperStar 2)	Host		
2008	Lonely Planet Bluelist: Best In Asia	Host		
2008	U Are The One (唯我独尊)	Host		
2008	Don't Forget the Lyrics			
2009	Singapore Flavours (万里香)	Host		
2009	On the Beat 3 (都是大发现3)	Guest Host		
2009	I want a holiday (玩游世界)			
2010	Funtastic (太自由)	Host		
2010	Lodge with Me (我行我宿)	Host (Korea episodes)		

== Awards and nominations ==
Year	Ceremony	Category	Nominated work	Result	Ref
2001	Star Awards	Best Newcomer	My Genie	Won	
2001	Star Awards	Best Comedy Performer	My Genie	Nominated	
2001	Star Awards	Top 10 Most Popular Female Artistes	—N/a	Won	
2002	Star Awards	Top 10 Most Popular Female Artistes	—N/a	Nominated	
2003	Star Awards	Top 10 Most Popular Female Artistes	—N/a	Nominated	
2004	Star Awards	Top 10 Most Popular Female Artistes	—N/a	Nominated	
2005	Star Awards	Top 10 Most Popular Female Artistes	—N/a	Nominated	
2006	Star Awards	Top 10 Most Popular Female Artistes	—N/a	Won	
2007	Star Awards	Top 10 Most Popular Female Artistes	—N/a	Nominated	
2009	Star Awards	Top 10 Most Popular Female Artistes	—N/a	Nominated	
2019	The Asian Awards	Outstanding Achievement in Cinema	Crazy Rich Asians	Won	
