= Jacen Tan =

Singaporean director

Jacen Tan is a Singaporean independent film director, and has been named by The Straits Times Life! as one of Singapore's "most exciting young talents" and “Singapore's latest film funnyman”.

Tan is known for his low budget films, highly localised treatment of Singaporean issues and the liberal use of Singlish in his films. All his film titles consist of commonly spoken Hokkien words. He has directed music videos for popular Singaporean bands Rudra, Lunarin and Documentary in Amber, and has been named by The Straits Times Life! as one of Singapore's "most exciting young talents". His films Tak Giu and Zo Peng are used in the course "Singapore Literature & Culture II" at Nanyang Technological University

== Career ==
Jacen's first short film, Tak Giu (Kick Ball), became a viral hit on the Internet in 2005, with over 100,000 views. It was spread by e-mail in the pre-YouTube days, and overwhelming traffic caused the servers to crash. Many fans offering to host the 42mb video file on their servers, and it became 'Singapore's first viral short film'.

Popularising the local slang “Hosay” (“Great!”) has helped Tan stand out as a filmmaker who has embraced being Singaporean by touching on topics close to the hearts of the people. 8 Days magazine refers to Jacen's films as having “more Singaporean flavour than a pot of curry.”

Shot in 7 days with a borrowed camera, Tak Giu critiques the lack of playing spaces in Singapore in the context of the nation's drive to enter the World Cup Finals in 2010. Two years after Tak Giu was released, 284 State fields were upgraded and opened for public recreation. Tak Giu gathered over 100,000 internet views.

Jacen also served as assistant director on Han Yew Kwang's comedy hit, Rubbers.

In November 2005, Tan's 2nd film, Zo Peng (Go Army), won 2nd place at the Panasonic/MDA Digital Film Fiesta, and in 2008 received Jury Prize for Short Film from Asian Film Archive. In Singapore males are required to serve two years of mandatory army training as part of their national duties. Zo Peng postulates a future where females are similarly required to serve two years of mandatory army training. The film re-genders the issue of national duty and military service in a light-hearted comic treatment.ity.

Zo Gang, his 3rd short film about a struggling filmmaker wannabe. The film includes parodies and references to Quentin Tarantino, Eric Khoo, Jack Neo, Electrico, Royston Tan. It includes cameos of musicians from the Singapore rock scene such as Linda Ong from Lunarin and Patrick Chng of The Oddfellows.

Zo Hee, the sequel to Zo Gang, was specially commissioned by The Substation Moving Images and premiered at The Substation during Moving Images' 10 years anniversary celebrations, and includes cameos by prominent Singapore film-makers such as Juan Foo, Tan Pin Pin, Sun Koh, Kristin Saw and Lionel Chok.

In 2009, Tan released Kwa Giu (Watch Football), a documentary tribute to the former National Stadium of Singapore. It was filmed during the AFC Cup Final (Singapore vs Thailand) on 31 January 2007. The stadium was demolished in 2010.

In 2011, Jacen released Hosaywood, a DVD compilation of his short films.

In 2015, Tan released Homeground, a documentary about playing spaces in Singapore. The film pays tribute to weekend warriors and their 'homegrounds' where they play soccer and forge friendships. The film was the winner of POSB's Storytellers Grant.

Zombiepura is Jacen's first feature film. The horror-comedy revolves around a zombie outbreak in an isolated army camp where a lazy reservist soldier and a commander need to fight to survive. The film stars Alaric Tay and Benjamin Heng. It has been described as 'Ah Boys To Men' meets 'The Walking Dead'.

After seven years of development, the film was announced in Asia TV Forum & Market 2017.

== Filmography ==
- Zombiepura (2018) - Feature film
- Homeground (2015) - Documentary
- Kwa Giu (2009) - Documentary film
- Zo Hee (2008) - Short film
- Zo Gang (2007) - Short film
- Zo Peng (2006) - Short film
- Tak Giu (2005) - Short film

== Music videos ==
Hymns from the Blazing Chariot, Rudra – 2009

Silverpiece, Lunarin – 2006
