= Younesi =

Younesi (Persian: یونسی, romanized: Younesi, Bengali: ইউনুসী, romanized: Iunusi) is a surname. Notable people with the surname include:

- Ali Younesi (born 1951), Iranian politician
- Ebrahim Younesi, Kurdish writer
- Michael Younesi (born 1987), American filmmaker
- Tarik Elyounoussi, Swedish footballer
