= Calefare =

- Starring: Gurmit Singh; Fiona Xie; Benjamin Heng; Vadi Pvss; Mastura Ahmad; Tracy Tan
- Country of origin: Singapore
- No. of episodes: 13

Production
- Running time: 30 minutes (with commercials)

Original release
- Network: MediaCorp TV Channel 5
- Release: August 9 – November 4, 2008

Calefare (locally pronounced /kɛlɛfɛ/) is an English-language Singaporean comedy series that debuted on Saturday, August 9, 2008, on MediaCorp TV's Channel 5 as a "Sneak Preview," airing right after the National Day Parade. The series then began their regular Tuesday night 8:00 pm airing on August 19, 2008, for its 13-week run. The single-camera satirical program revolves around a quintet of aspiring actors who land walk-on roles on television and their goals to break into the entertainment business.

== Series background ==
The cast of Calefare. From left to right: Benjamin Heng, Fiona Xie, Gurmit Singh, Mastura Ahmad and Vadi Pvss

The series takes aim at what people will do to make it in the world of television, whether they have talent or not, as it follows five individuals who are aiming for fame and fortune (and all the perks that come with it) as "Calefare," a word to describe actors who land small parts. The term refers to bit-role actors, or extras, in the entertainment industry in Hong Kong, Malaysia and Singapore. They hope that this small step will lead to larger things. Each episode chronicles their misfortune of trying to break into the business big time.

The five are taking part in the production of a television miniseries that is being produced by Channel 5 called Road to Liberation, a drama about World War II. But behind the scenes they find themselves at war with Huay Huay, the assistant director who gave them their big break and has a reputation of manipulating the quintet after they take issue with her or turn down their demands.

Andy Lau Hong: Played by Gurmit Singh, Andy is a veteran calefare who longs to be a major actor (his mother named him after Hong Kong actor/singer Andy Lau) but for the past 15 years has yet to be noticed.
Joleen Wee: Played by Fiona Xie, Joleen is an aspiring singer who can't sing (she calls herself "The recording artiste of tomorrow ... who has yet to soar!"), even as she tries hard to get herself and her songs noticed on YouTube. Her reason for doing this is because singing and acting have one thing in common: they both end with "ing".
Hamsome: Played by Benjamin Heng, Hamsome is a new-age being with a penchant for picking fights and doing anything that is stupid but at the same time gets walk-on roles because his loan shark father (which Hamsome doesn't want to be part of) has threatened the people working on the studio set.
Sanjay Chabra: Played by Vadi Pvss, Sanjay is a veteran of more than 600 Bollywood films (599 of them were 10-second walk-ons, the 600th caused a riot at cinemas in his native India) who still finds himself landing walk-on roles after moving to Singapore in his quest to make it big.
Kak Pon: Played by Mastura Ahmad, Kak Pon is a part-time calefare who decided to join this occupation after she took acting lessons at a community center just for fun when she is not attending to her other day job, a Nasi Padang stall, which she has operated for 15 years (She says that she is in the "Food Business"). Kak Pon is also the smartest member of the quintet when it comes to current entertainment gossip and probably the only one who cares. She also freely dispenses advice and acts as the "de facto" counsellor for the hopefuls.

== Episodes ==
- 1. Calefare Down (August 9, 2008)

On the set of "Road to Liberation," a A-List Singaporean actor named Champion Zhang (guest star Edmund Chen) plays a Japanese World War II officer, who really gets into the role by punching him for real during an interrogation scene. After several complaints made by Champion, Andy was replaced by Hamsome. But when Hamsome punches Champion in retaliation during a retake, the star holds Andy responsible and challenges him to a fight at the car park after the last scene of the day. Sanjay volunteered to coach Andy in fighting skills, but failed when Andy sprained his hand upon the first hit on the sandbag. The matter was rested when Champion suffered from stomachache after consuming the chocolate given by Andy as a gift of apology; the chocolates had been expired for 2 years!! Because of that, Champion vomited on Joleen during a close-up shot.

- 2. Calefare No Enough (August 19, 2008)

After Andy reaches a truce with Champion Zhang (guest star Edmund Chen), the two go out for lunch, which Andy sees as a way to pick up some acting tips. However, not only does Champion ask Andy to pay for their lunch, he also borrows money from him. When Kak discovers that Champion has been going around borrowing money from both the quintet and Huay, she sets up a scheme to get their money back from the two-timing TV star.

- 3. Pray Calefare Pray (August 26, 2008) (PG - Supernatural)

When Andy is asked by Huay to lie in a coffin and play a corpse for a TV scene, he is supposed to be given an ang-pow from Huay, which is to ward off bad luck from people pretending to play dead, but Huay forgets all about it. This sets off a series of chain events when the set is hit by a series of accidents and plagued by bad luck, leading the other calefare members to start avoiding Andy, who now consider him a jinx. When Andy starts trying to find a way to reverse the curse, he seeks the help of Huay, who in turn sends him to- of all people- a medium (played by guest star Michelle Chong).

- 4. Calefare With A High "C" (September 2, 2008)

Aspiring singer Joleen finally gets her big break when she is contacted by a famous local singer named Johnny Chia (played by guest star Jonathan Leong), who wants her to sing back up on his new album after seeing a music video she put up on YouTube. But as Joleen feels elated over her sudden discovery, she left out one minor detail: Joleen didn't actually sing in the YouTube video, she was lip-synching to another artist's song, which was a demo made by a friend of Joleen's (the vocals was done by Tracy Tan, who plays Huay on the show). With one day left to go before the recording in which she has to actually sing for real, the quintet try to turn Joleen into a real singer by concocting a strange and elaborate plan that involves Andy singing falsetto.

- 5. My Funny Calefare (September 9, 2008)

When Joleen starts receiving flowers from a secret admirer on the set (even though she is allergic to flowers), the others try to speculate who it could be from. Among the suitors being rumored includes actor Manly Han (guest star Julian Hee), Woody, Hamsome, Andy, and Sanjay. But it looks like the aforementioned suitors are going to be in shock when they find out it is none of the above.

- 6. Calefare Vs. Director (September 16, 2008)

When an old nemesis of Woody, Aravon Ang (Alaric Tay), guest stars in the show, he proceeds to makes Woody jealous by currying the favor of the quintet and the Road to Liberation crew by buying them things. This latest on-set confrontation between the two would later result in Woody being fired from the set. But just as the quintet rejoice in seeing Woody banished from the set, they get a stunning shocker when they discover who replaced him as the new director on the show.

- 7. Hair There Calefare (September 23, 2008)

In this installment, Zheng Geping guest stars as Jerrod Ha, a popular celebrity-actor who is rumoured to have false hair, so when Andy and Huay enter into a bet to find out if the rumours are true, Andy enlists his fellow Calefares to help win the bet for him. But instead of exposing the "myth" of Jerrod's hair, they end up causing more hair-raising trouble than they can handle!

- 8. Dinner with Calefare (September 30, 2008)

After the set of Road to Liberation is suddenly shut down during the evening, the quintet are left with nothing to do until Hamsome invites them over to his loan shark father's house for dinner, and the group reluctantly accept, only to discover that Hamsome's dad is also conducting a "recruitment exercise" that night ... and Andy has been drafted! Guest starring Richard Low and Jimmy Taenaka.

- 9. Calefare Play Ball (October 7, 2008) (PG - Violence)

Its fun in the sun when Huay surprises the quintet by getting them jobs on a new beach volleyball drama she is working on, which is set in Sentosa. Unfortunately, its no fun on the beach for Joleen and Kak when they get off on the wrong foot after mistaking the stars of the show for fellow calefare and insult them, prompting the two offended stars to subject Joleen and Kak to a painful "orientation." Meanwhile, Andy and Hamsome become the target of an island-wide manhunt when Andy is mistaken for an escaped convict who looks exactly like him. Guest starring Priscelia Chan and Rebecca Lim.

- 10. The Great Calefare Scandal (October 14, 2008)

The Calefare are called back to the set when production on The Road To Liberation resumes. When the guest star of the week, Maximus, leaves his laptop lying around on the set, the Calefare can't help but take a peek inside. They are shocked to discover embarrassing photos on the laptop. Before they can return the laptop to its original place, the cast and crew returns; now Andy and company have to find a way to replace the laptop before they get into trouble on their first day back! Guest starring Utt.

- 11. The Calefare Who Wasn't There (October 21, 2008)

At the end of a late night shoot, Kak and Hamsome find a notebook with the names of several actors and directors on it, the first four of them mysteriously crossed out. They soon discover that the first four people listed in the notebook died strange and tragic deaths. The Calefare must find out the origin of the notebook, before the next person on the list meets his end: Andy.

- 12. One Star Calefare (October 28, 2008)

A local entertainment magazine gives The Road To Liberation a terrible review. Woody and Huay Huay send Joleen off on a mission – to meet with the reviewer (Chua En Lai) and score points for the show by "loosening him up." Unfortunately, after her attempt at dinner, the review gets worse instead of better. Andy decides to tag along on their next date to find out why ...

- 13. Calefare On Strike (Last Episode) (November 4, 2008)

When Huay Huay asks the Calefare to repay the management for all the props and materials they've broken on set, the Calefare decide to go on strike. To their shock, they are all fired. Friendships turn sour as they start blaming each other for the situation. Just when things couldn't get worse, they are called back to the set. However, they joy is short-lived – they are still fired, but due to a miscalculation, they now owe the management even more money.

== Syndication ==
In 2009, Galloping Films, an Australian-based television and film distribution company, acquired the international rights to MediaCorp-produced programs, including Calefare, for syndication outside of Singapore.
