= Jasmine Ng =

Singaporean filmmaker (born 1972)

- Born: 1972 (age 53–54); Singapore
- Education: Singapore Chinese Girls' School; Victoria Junior College
- Alma mater: New York University Tisch School of the Arts
- Occupations: Film director; producer; screenwriter; lecturer
- Years active: 1996−present

Chinese name
- Traditional Chinese: 黃錦佳
- Simplified Chinese: 黃錦佳
- Hanyu Pinyin: Huáng Jǐnjiā

Jasmine Ng Kin Kia (Chinese: 黃錦佳; born 1972) is a Singaporean film director. She is known for co-directing the feature film Eating Air, the documentary film Pink Paddlers and the short film Moveable Feast. She is also a part-time film lecturer at the National University of Singapore.

== Early life and education ==
While Ng was studying at Singapore Chinese Girls' School, she filmed her own rendition of Swan Lake with the "odd-sized girls" in her class, which she titled Duck Pond. She studied at Victoria Junior College. In 1991, she became the first person to win a scholarship to study at New York University Tisch School of the Arts, jointly offered by the Economic Development Board and VHQ.

In the summer of 1992, Ng, Sandi Tan and Sophia Siddique decided to make a film. They were guided by Georges Cardona, who was their mentor and close friend. Directed by Cardona, Tan plays a serial killer in the film which was edited by Ng and produced by Siddique. Before the film could be completed, Cardona disappeared with the film footage. The footage was later recovered and became part of the 2018 documentary film Shirkers directed by Tan.

== Career ==
In 1996, Ng co-directed the 14-minute short film Moveable Feast with Sandi Tan and Kelvin Tong. It won the Best Short Film Award at the Singapore International Film Festival and played at various other film festivals. By then, she had also become a film and video editor at VHQ.

Ng co-directed the feature film Eating Air with Tong in 1999. The romantic action film was the acting debut of Benjamin Heng and feature debut of Michelle Chong with a supporting role. The film won the Young Cinema Award at the 2000 Singapore International Film Festival. It has since been considered a cult film among the local film community.

In 2007, Ng directed the documentary film Pink Paddlers. The film follows the dragonboat team members of the Breast Cancer Society as they get ready for the Breast Cancer Survivors DragonBoat World Championship. The film received a grant from the Khoo Teck Puat Foundation and raised funds for the Breast Cancer Foundation Singapore, Unifem and SCWO Star Shelter.

Ng was a Board Member of the Singapore International Film Festival in 2009. She has also directed several television commercials and held film workshops and mentorship programmes.

Ng was an interviewee in Sandi Tan's Shirkers, the 2018 documentary film. By then, Ng was a part-time film lecturer at the National University of Singapore and had taught at the LASALLE College of the Arts, various polytechnics and primary schools.

In 2023, Ng co-produced A Year of No Significance directed by Kelvin Tong.

== Filmography ==
- Moveable Feast (1996; co-directed with Sandi Tan and Kelvin Tong)
- Eating Air (1999; co-directed with Kelvin Tong)
- Pink Paddlers (2007)
- Ajoomma (2022; editor)
- A Year of No Significance (2023/2024; co-produced)
- Crocodile Tears (2024; editor)
- Four Seasons in Java (2026; editor)
