= Citybeat =

Citybeat may refer to:

- Citybeat (band), a 1980s Hong Kong pop music group
- Belfast CityBeat, a Northern Irish radio station
- Cincinnati CityBeat, an independent local arts and issues publication in Cincinnati, Ohio
- LA CityBeat, a defunct alternative weekly newspaper in Los Angeles, California
- San Diego CityBeat, an alternative weekly newspaper in San Diego, California
- Citybeat, a weekly entertainment and music section in the Australian free afternoon daily newspaper mX

== See also ==
- City Beat, a New Zealand reality television series
