= Buttwhistle =

2014 film by Tenney Fairchild

- Poster
- Directed by: Tenney Fairchild
- Written by: Tenney Fairchild
- Produced by: Greg McCollum; Michael Younesi; Leah Fong; Tenney Fairchild
- Starring: Trevor Morgan; Lio Tipton (Note: Credited as Analeigh Tipton; Tipton came out as non-binary and changed their name in 2021.); Elizabeth Rice; Adhir Kalyan; Thomas Jane
- Cinematography: Akis Konstantakopoulos
- Edited by: Nathan Cali; Hovig Menakian
- Production company: M-80 Films
- Distributed by: Breaking Glass Pictures
- Release date: April 25, 2014 (Los Angeles)
- Running time: 93 minutes
- Country: United States
- Language: English

Buttwhistle is a 2014 American crime comedy-drama film written and directed by Tenney Fairchild. The film stars Trevor Morgan, Lio Tipton, Elizabeth Rice, Adhir Kalyan and Thomas Jane. It received negative reviews from critics. In it, Ogden Confer, a young student who’s still living with his parents and struggling emotionally after the recent death of his best friend, Rose. While he’s dealing with his grief, he accidentally prevents a mysterious young woman named Beth from committing suicide. Instead of gratitude, Beth turns on him and begins to make his life difficult—essentially forcing him to “pay” for interfering in her attempt and getting involved in her problems. As a result, Ogden gets drawn into a series of increasingly bizarre and troubling situations as Beth’s behavior wreaks havoc on him.

== Cast ==
- Trevor Morgan as Ogden
- Elizabeth Rice as Beth
- Lio Tipton as Rose
- Adhir Kalyan as Hate Crime John
- Stella Maeve as Missy Blancmange
- Alex Solowitz as Ray Ferzonki
- Katherine LaNasa as Mrs. Confer
- Wallace Langham as Mr. Confer
- Thomas Jane as Grumisch
- Patty McCormack as Grandma Confer
- Griffin Newman as Fenwick
- Blake Robbins as Mr. Blancmange

== Release ==
The film was released theatrically in Los Angeles on April 25, 2014.

== Plot ==
The story is told in a choppy surreal manner, with frequent absurd happenings acting as backdrop for the dialogue and story. The film opens with a shot of a man in an office's head exploding; it is referenced throughout the film as an ongoing news report. We meet Ogden as he discusses his never-begun career as a gymnastics talent with his friend Hate Crime John in an abandoned warehouse. Roz, a young woman they both know, shows Ogden her new tattoo and leaves with her biker boyfriend. In a series of flashes, Ogden is shown saving Beth from jumping off a bridge. He takes her home to his parents who welcome her along with Ogden's various quirks without comment. At one point he says he's changing his name to the sound of an airhorn blowing. Through the rest of the movie this is referenced with people alternately referring to him as Ogden or by blowing an airhorn. Beth is shown to be antisocial and brash; she lies to Ogden's parents that he told her to call him "buttwhistle". Ogden does not refute this.

Ogden and Beth strike up an emotionally fraught relationship. She escalates her antisocial behavior through a variety of methods including stealing his money and spitting in his food. He notices at least some of these but does not stop her or protest. Throughout, Ogden is shown to hallucinate/imagine a girl named Rose, later revealed to be a dead friend of his. At one point a pair of cops show up and interrogate Ogden about missing dogs. Further surreal elements include a talking bar of soap, a robotic arm, and flashback/dream moments cut throughout.

Ogden is shown to have a good relationship with the people in his life but Beth sets out to ruin them all. She tries to get him to stop giving his grandmother rides by crashing the car on purpose and leaving a note saying Ogden did it. She sends an inflammatory email to a classmate of Ogden's and gets Ogden into a fight with Roz's boyfriend by saying Ogden called him "cow tits". In all of these cases Ogden is able to brush her off and "win" the situation. This only serves to infuriate her more and cause her to escalate. She throws away his college admissions letters, hangs a Nazi flag from his house and changes his license plate to the N-word.

Eventually the building evidence that Beth is malicious becomes too much for Ogden to ignore. The people whose car he hit call the house, he finds the college acceptance letters in the trash, and Rose tells him he needs to break up with her. Beth's response to him pulling away is to lure him to a warehouse where she tells him to leave her and duct-tapes her whole head, including her mouth and nose before running away from him. Ogden wanders away where he is arrested by the police, having been framed by Beth for the murders of Roz and his classmate. As he drives down the road he passes several figures from the ruined relationships Beth orchestrated. Beth is shown holding a dog as Ogden's parents come back from vacation and greet her warmly.

== Reception ==
Geoff Berkshire of Variety gave the film a negative review and wrote that it "actually attempts to be an emotionally resonant relationship tale, but lives down to its title by delivering nothing but inane comedy and insufferable drama."

Justin Lowe of The Hollywood Reporter also gave the film a negative review and wrote that it "proves so cryptically scripted and dramatically under-powered that genre characterizations almost fail to do it justice."
