= 2018 National Society of Film Critics Awards =

Annual US film awards ceremony

53rd NSFC Awards

January 5, 2019

Best Film:
The Rider

The 53rd National Society of Film Critics Awards, given on 5 January 2019, honored the best in film for 2018.

== Winners ==
Winners are listed in boldface along with the runner-up positions and counts from the final round:

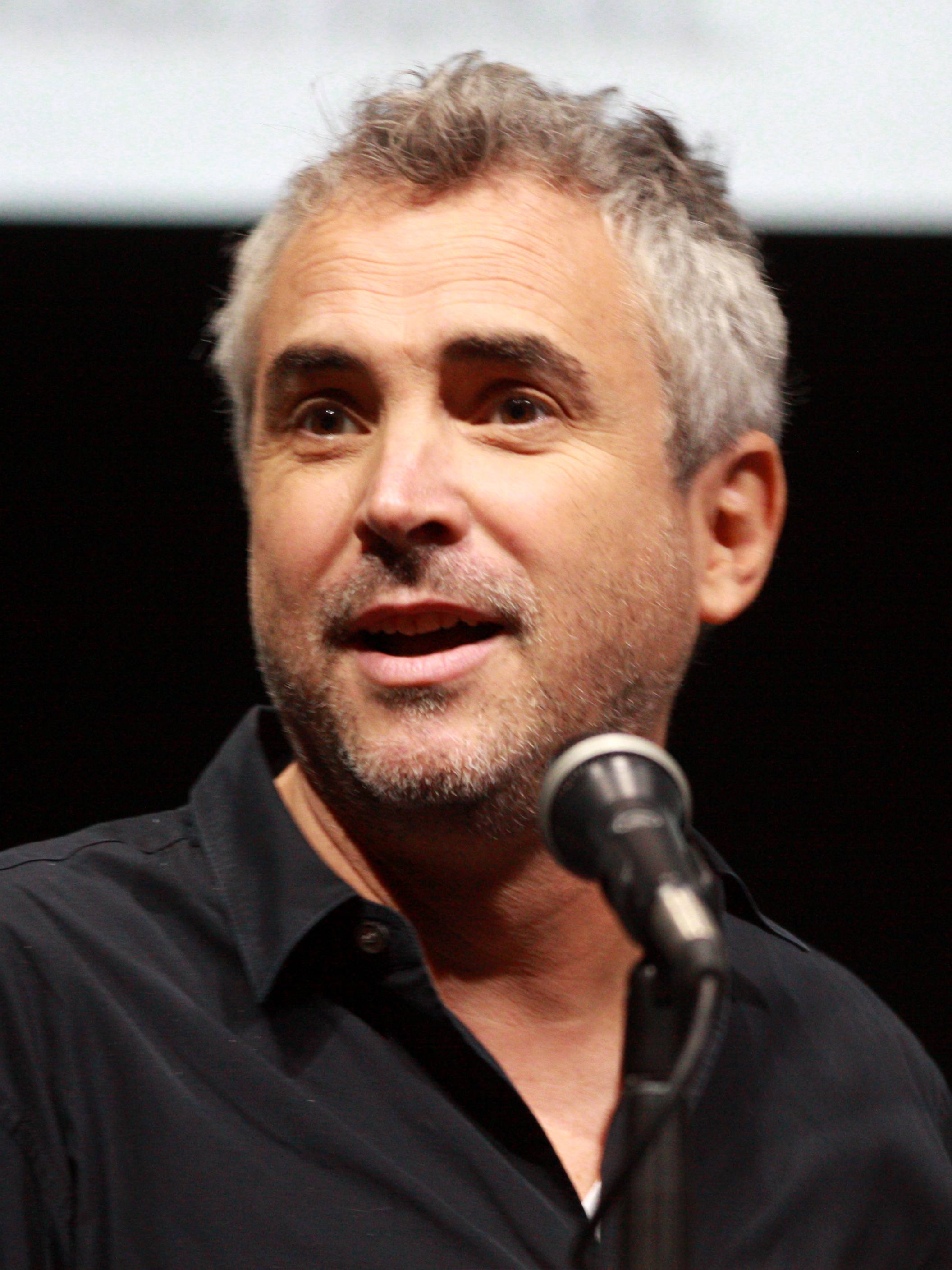
Alfonso Cuarón, Best Director winner

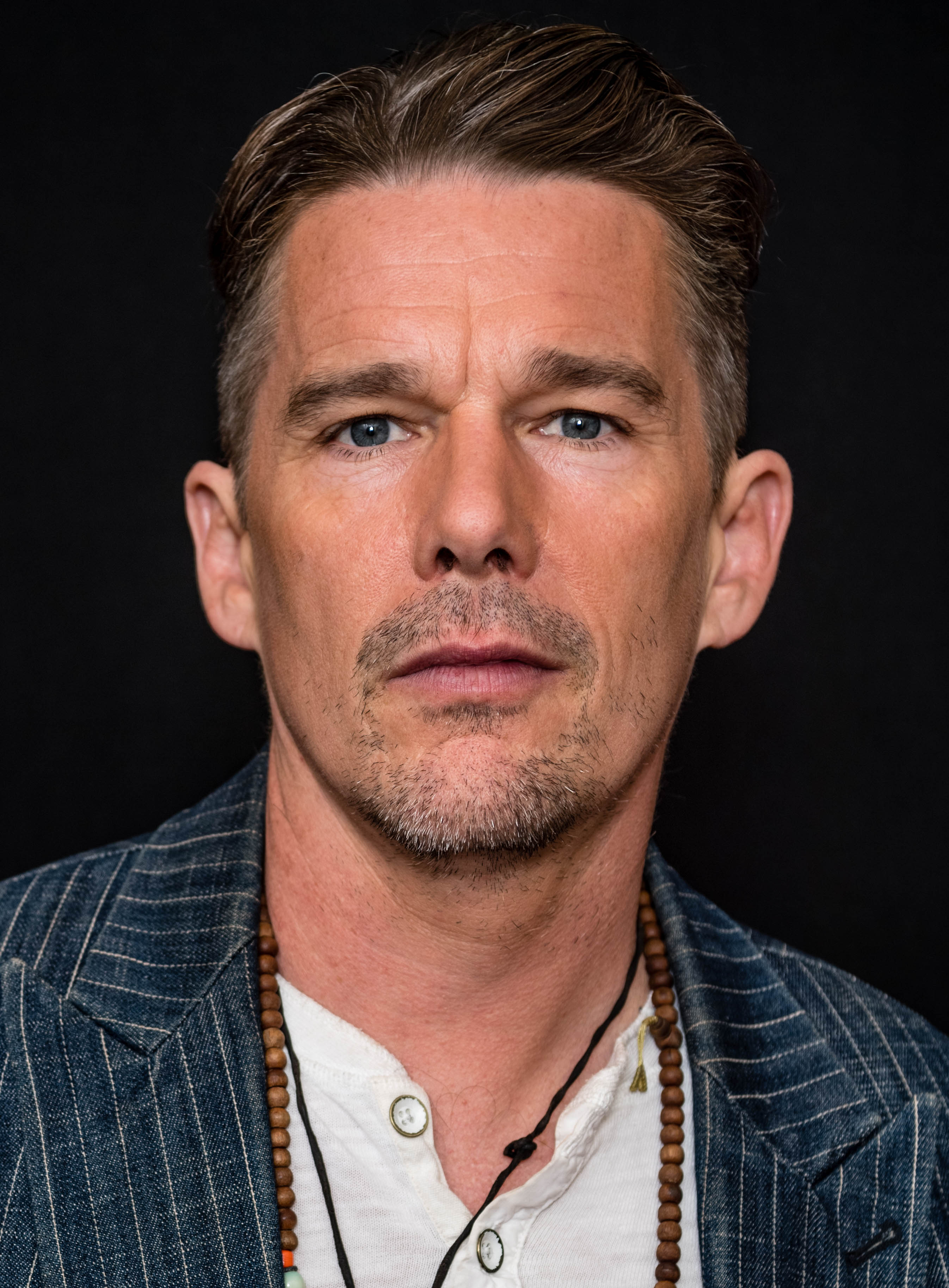
Ethan Hawke, Best Actor winner

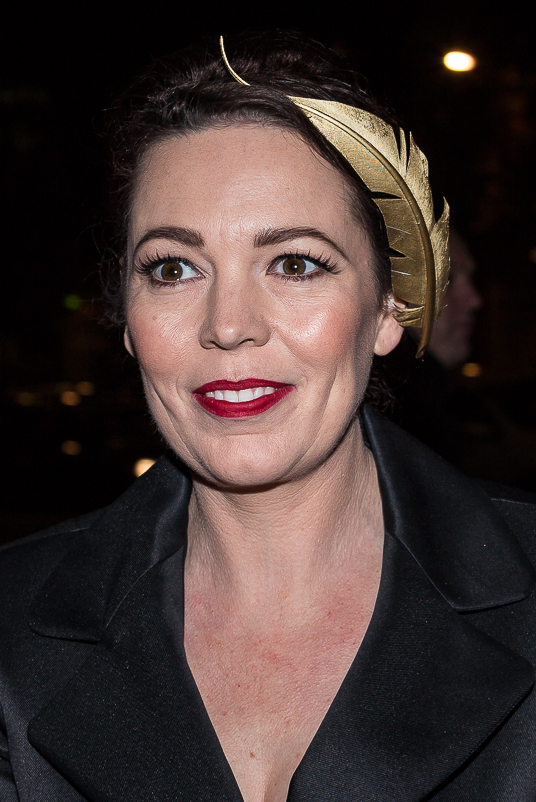
Olivia Colman, Best Actress winner

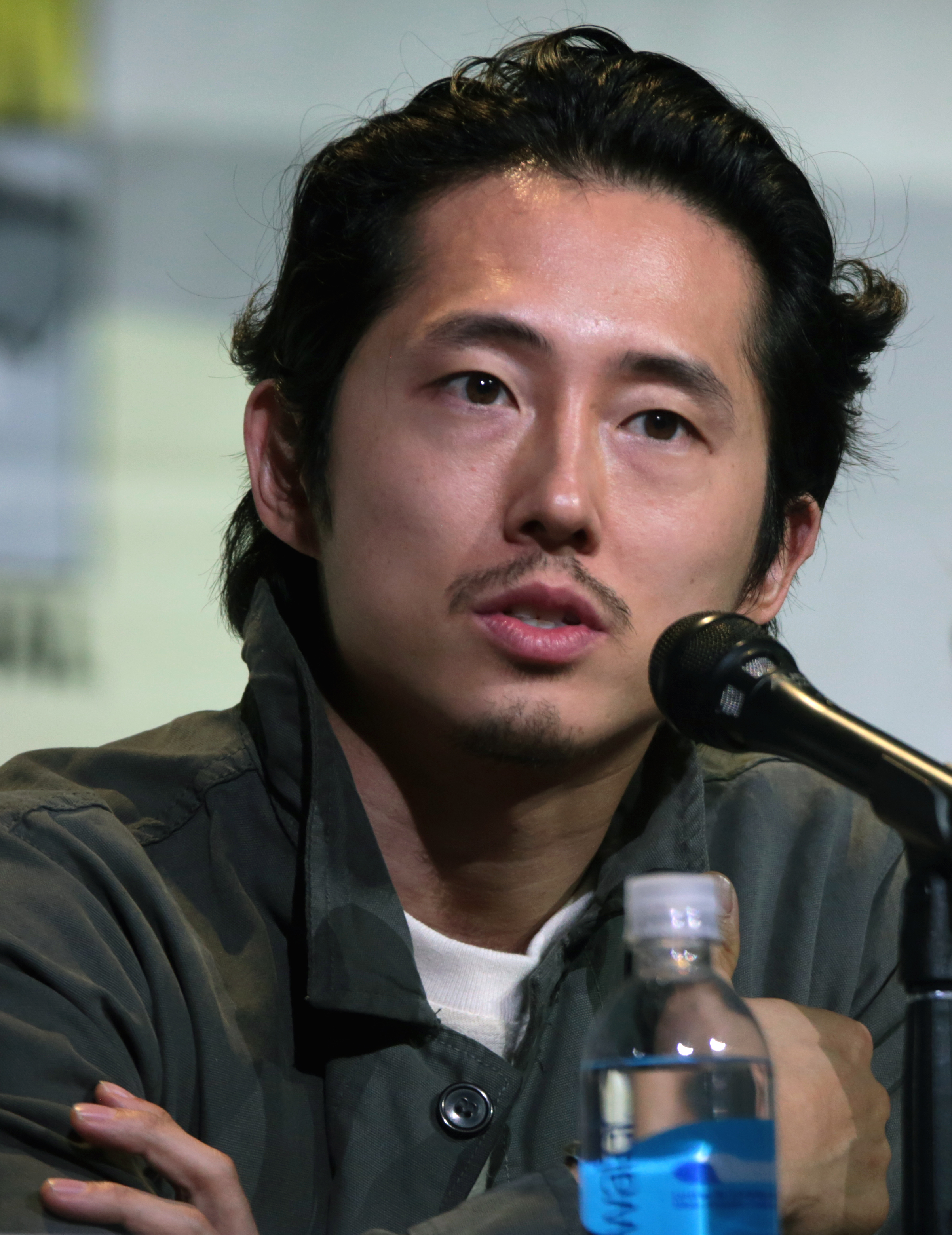
Steven Yeun, Best Supporting Actor winner

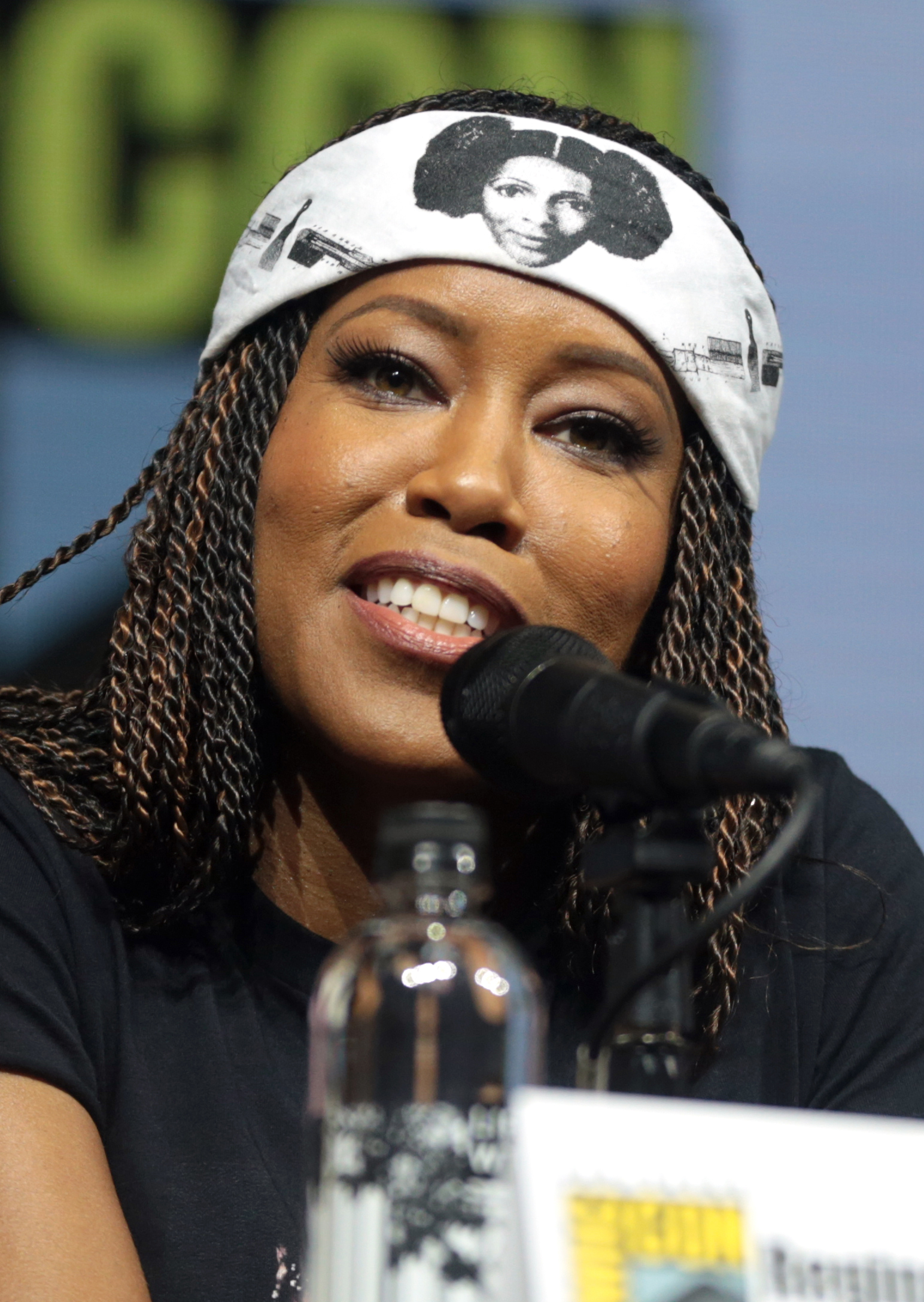
Regina King, Best Supporting Actress winner

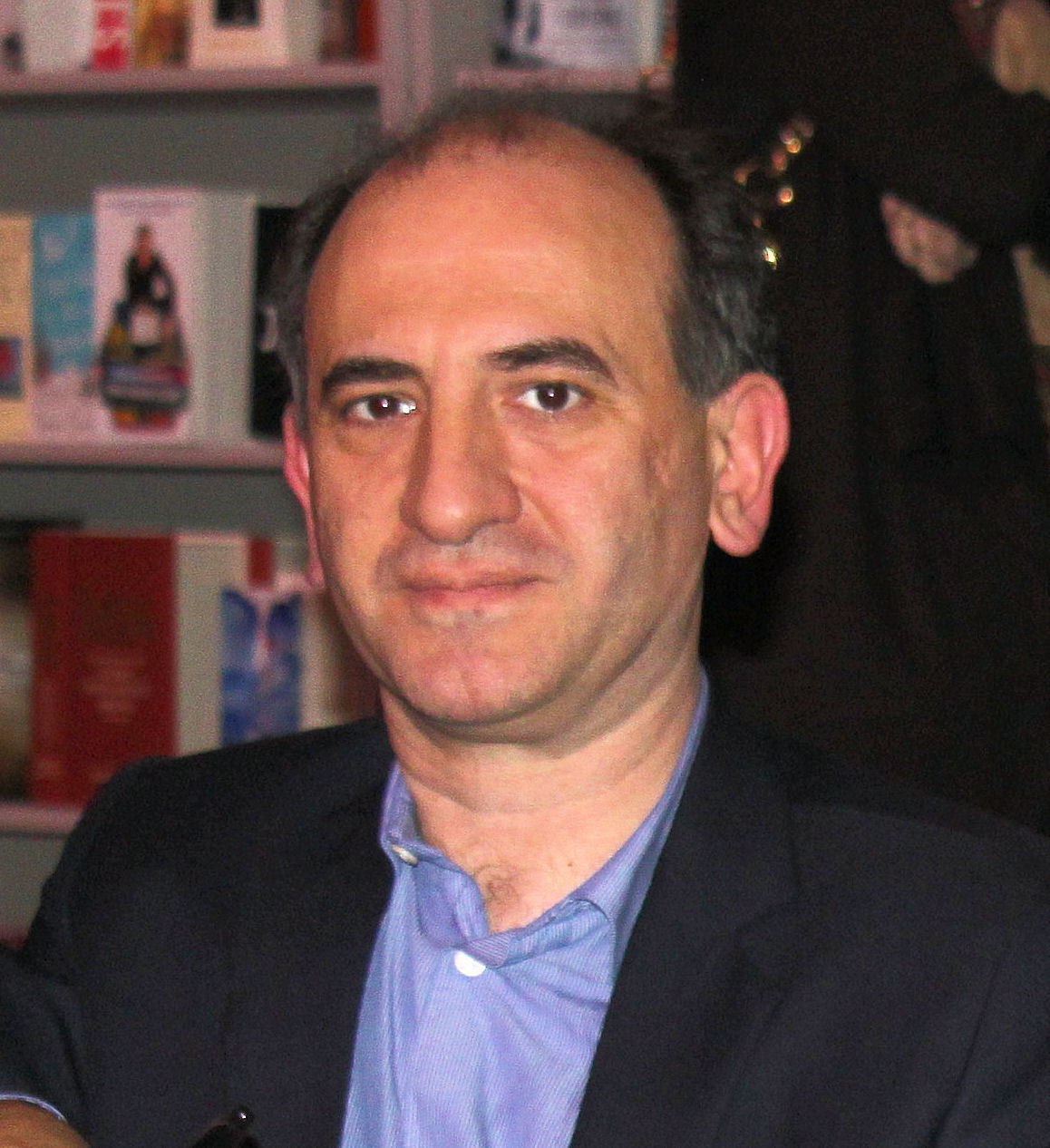
Armando Iannucci, Best Screenplay co-winner

=== Best Picture ===
1. **The Rider** (44)
2. Roma (41)
3. Burning (27)

=== Best Director ===
1. **Alfonso Cuarón – Roma** (60)
2. Lee Chang-dong – Burning (22)
3. Chloé Zhao – The Rider (22)

=== Best Actor ===
1. **Ethan Hawke – First Reformed** (58)
2. Willem Dafoe – At Eternity's Gate (30)
3. Ben Foster – Leave No Trace (25)
4. John C. Reilly – The Sisters Brothers and Stan & Ollie (25)

=== Best Actress ===
1. **Olivia Colman – The Favourite** (36)
2. Regina Hall – Support the Girls (33)
3. Melissa McCarthy – Can You Ever Forgive Me? (27)

=== Best Supporting Actor ===
1. **Steven Yeun – Burning** (40)
2. Richard E. Grant – Can You Ever Forgive Me? (35)
3. Brian Tyree Henry – If Beale Street Could Talk, Spider-Man: Into the Spider-Verse, and Widows (32)

=== Best Supporting Actress ===
1. **Regina King – If Beale Street Could Talk** (47)
2. Elizabeth Debicki – Widows (37)
3. Emma Stone – The Favourite (24)

=== Best Screenplay ===
1. **Armando Iannucci, David Schneider, and Ian Martin – The Death of Stalin** (47)
2. Nicole Holofcener and Jeff Whitty – Can You Ever Forgive Me? (27)
3. Deborah Davis and Tony McNamara – The Favourite (24)

=== Best Cinematography ===
1. **Alfonso Cuarón – Roma** (70)
2. James Laxton – If Beale Street Could Talk (26)
3. Łukasz Żal – Cold War (24)

=== Best Foreign Language Film ===
1. **Roma – Alfonso Cuarón** (44)
2. Cold War – Paweł Pawlikowski (34)
3. Burning – Lee Chang-dong (30)
4. Shoplifters – Hirokazu Kore-eda (30)

=== Best Non-Fiction Film ===
1. **Minding the Gap – Bing Liu** (35)
2. Shirkers – Sandi Tan (31)
3. Amazing Grace – Sydney Pollack (24)

=== Film Heritage Award ===
- Museum of Modern Art for restoring Ernst Lubitsch's 1923 film Rosita.
- "The team of producers, editors, restorers, technicians, and cineastes who labored for decades to bring Orson Welles's The Other Side of the Wind to completion for a new generation of movie lovers."

=== Special Citation ===
- A Family Tour, a film awaiting American distribution
