= Alaric Tay =

Singaporean actor (born 1979)

- Born: 26 June 1979 (age 47); Singapore
- Other name: Zheng Liangxiong
- Education: Griffith University
- Occupations: Actor; producer; director; comedian; host
- Years active: 1996–present
- Spouse: Juliet Tay (m. 2010)
- Children: 2

Chinese name
- Traditional Chinese: 鄭良雄
- Simplified Chinese: 郑良雄
- Hanyu Pinyin: Zhèng Liángxióng
- Website: www.alarictay.com

Alaric Tay Liang Hoong (born 26 June 1979) is a Singaporean actor, comedian, host, director and producer.

== Early life ==
Tay was born in Singapore and raised in religiously legalistic family. He would later passionately pursue entertainment as the career of his choice and graduated with a degree in film studies from Griffith University in Australia.

He began his career in the film and television scene as an actor at the age of seventeen. Tay was given a supporting role in a made-in-Singapore feature film called That's the Way I Like It, which was picked up for North American distribution in 1998 by Miramax.

== Acting career ==
Tay has taken on diverse roles over the years, including leads in tele-movies like Ang Tao Mui, Adventures of Holden Heng, and a well-received comic turn in the dramedy, Money. Tay also played lead roles in the sitcom, The Yang Sisters season 1 and 2 which ran on Mediacorp's Channel 5 as well as Random Acts, which was aired on Arts Central. His amusing physicality has provided shows like Whizzes of the Void Deck. He also played the role of a Chinese prisoner in a Lion TV production of The Great Wall of China and the role of Daniel in the film Carrot Cake Conversations.

In 2010, Tay acted in comedy film When Hainan Meets Teochew.

He is famously known for his role as nasal-voiced field reporter Andre Chichak in the MediaCorp Channel 5 satirical sitcom The Noose. He appeared as Kang in the 2013 HBO Asia series Serangoon Road and as James in the Singapore Police Force-commissioned series C.L.I.F. 3 in 2014.

== Filmmaking career ==
Tay is also a filmmaker. His film When We Were Bengs won three prizes at the 2007 ReelHeART International Film Festival, for Best Experimental Film, Best Sound and Best Editing, while his short documentary Journey of Change has garnered critical acclaim from audiences at its special screenings in Singapore, Malaysia, Australia, and the U.S.

In 2011, Tay started developing his first sci-fi action film, Final Defect. The 12-minute short film, a sci-fi tale about the dangers of playing God, stars his fellow Fly Entertainment artistes US-born actor Jimmy Taenaka and veteran actress Janice Koh and is slated for a 2012 release.

In 2016, Tay's boutique production company, Very Tay Media company was commissioned by HBO Asia to co-produce its first original 8-part comedy series Sent. Tay was also its showrunner and series director.

In 2017, Tay co-directed FAM!, a 13-part comedy series for Mediacorp MeWatch about a media-shy girl growing up in a social media family. The series starred Gurmit Singh, Vernetta Lopez, and Benjamin Kheng. It was nominated for an International Emmy for Best Comedy Series.

In 2018, Tay co-produced Zombiepura with film director, Jacen Tan from Hosaywood Studios and fellow co-star Benjamin Heng under the company, JAB Films. The acronyms of their first names combined (Jacen, Alaric, Benjamin) make up the company name – JAB. It is Tay's first starring role in a horror themed movie and it was theatrically released across Asia since October 2018. The film is regarded as Singapore's first wide-release zombie movie.

Throughout 2019, Tay collaborated on two more series projects for Mediacorp – I Am Madam and Cheerific. Serving as series co-director and showrunner, respectively.

In 2023, Very Tay and two Philippines companies Black Ops Studios Asia and PsyOps Studios formed a partnership to produce films of various genres for the international markets. The partnership included other companies such as Screen Ops (HK), Fly Entertainment, Causeway Media Productions and IAmCasting.

== Other interests ==
A student of the late John Spencer, and a former artiste of the Singapore Armed Forces Music and Drama Company (SAF MDC), Tay is an active member of the entertainment community. He has served as vice-president of the Ngee Ann Polytechnic Film, Sound and Video Alumni Chapter and continues to maintain his association with Breaking into Hollywood.

Tay is also an orator. He has hosted a variety of road shows to Dinner and Dances, to high-profile banquets involving national statesmen, politicians and ambassadors.

== Filmography ==
Film

Year	Title	Role	Notes	Ref.
2007	When We Were Bengs		Short film	
2010	When Hainan Meets Teochew	Ah Guang		
2012	Final Defect		Short film	
2018	Zombiepura	Tan Kayu		
2026	A Singapore Dementia Story		Short film	

=== Filmmaking credits ===
Year	Title	Director	Writer	Producer	Ref.
2007	When We Were Bengs	Yes	No	Yes	
2012	Final Defect	No	No	Yes	

Executive producer

- Zombiepura (2018)

== Awards and nominations ==
Organisation	Year	Award	Nominated work	Result	Ref
Asian Television Awards	2010	Best Comedy Performance	The Noose	Nominated	
Asian Television Awards	2011	Best Comedy Performance	The Noose	Nominated	

== Personal life ==
Tay and his wife have a son, born in 2013; and one daughter, who was born in 2019.
