= Bernard Tan (actor) =

Singaporean actor (born 1962 or 1963)

- Born: 1962 or 1963 (age 62–63); Singapore
- Other names: Chen Chuanzhi; Chen Tianlu
- Occupations: Actor; insurance dealer; model; host
- Years active: 1990−present

Birth name
- Traditional Chinese: 陳傳之
- Simplified Chinese: 陈传之
- Hanyu Pinyin: Chén Chuánzhī

Alternative name
- Traditional Chinese: 陳天路
- Simplified Chinese: 陈天路
- Hanyu Pinyin: Chén Tiānlù

Former stage name
- Traditional Chinese: 陳川之
- Simplified Chinese: 陈川之
- Hanyu Pinyin: Chén Chuānzhī

Bernard Tan Thuan Tjer (born in 1962 or 1963) is a Singaporean actor and insurance dealer. He has starred in the television series Bond of Love (1994), Silk and Romance (1995), A Romance in Shanghai (1996), The Other Parent (1997) and Point of Entry (2010−2014).

== Career ==
Tan was one of the 12 finalists of the 2nd Star Search Singapore competition in 1990, but withdrew before the finals and was replaced by another contestant Liang Yayu. Three years later after meeting a SBC producer, Tan took a three-month sabbatical leave from his ad agency and modelling job and made his acting debut in Bond of Love (1994), appearing opposite Aileen Tan and Lin Meijiao. He became a full-time actor in November 1994.

He has been a Great Eastern Life insurance dealer since 2009.

== Personal life ==
Tan attended Catholic High School where he was primary and secondary school classmates with actor Edmund Chen.

At a press conference for the Urofair 2012 Asia Pacific Congress of Urological Diseases, Tan spoke about suffering from testosterone deficiency (TD), revealing that the condition has caused him to constantly feel fatigued and unable to concentrate on "even simple, routine tasks".

== Filmography ==
Tan has appeared in the following programmes and films:

=== Television series ===
- Bond of Love (1994)
- Silk and Romance (1995)
- Project B (1995)
- The Golden Pillow (1995)
- Tales of the Third Kind (1996; season 3)
- A Romance in Shanghai (1996)
- Creative Edge (1996)
- My Destiny With You (1996)
- My Wife, Your Wife, Their Wives (1997)
- From The Medical Files (1997)
- The Other Parent (1997)
- Not The Facts (1997)
- Legend of The Crow (1998)
- Season of Love (1998)
- The New Adventures of Wisely (1998)
- Lost Soul (1999)
- The Story Of Nao Nao (1999; children drama)
- Knotty Liaison (2000)
- Dare To Strike (2000)
- My Home Affairs (2000)
- The Voices Within (2000)
- Phua Chu Kang Pte Ltd (2000; season 3)
- As You Like It (2000)
- In Pursuit of Peace (2001)
- Making Headlines (2001)
- Eternity: A Chinese Ghost Story (2003)
- Together Whenever (2003)
- Touched (2003)
- OK, No Problem (2003)
- 7th Month (2004; anthology series)
- Zero (2004)
- Love Concierge (2005)
- Echoes Of Time (2005)
- Honour and Passion (2007)
- Perfect Cut (2008)
- The Beautiful Scent (2008)
- Beach.Ball.Babes (2008)
- Red Thread (2009)
- Daddy at Home (2009)
- The Illusionist (2010)
- The Pupil (2010)
- Point of Entry (2010−2014)
- C.L.I.F. (2011)
- The Oath (2011)
- Unriddle 2 (2012)
- Show Hand (2012)
- Serangoon Road (2013)
- Koji Cooks (2014)
- Busy Body (2014)
- Fiends and Foes (2014; episode 3: "Union Wars")
- Mata Mata (2014; season 2)
- Verdict (2015)
- Blissful Living (2015)
- Accidental Agents (2015)
- Jump Class (2015)
- Second Chance (2015)
- The Queen (2016)
- My Teacher Is a Thug (2017)
- Life Less Ordinary (2017−2018)
- Gifted (2018)
- Say Cheese (2018)
- Till We Meet Again (2018)
- 20 Days (2018)
- You Can Be An Angel (2018; season 3)
- Fried Rice Paradise (2019)
- Daybreak (2019)
- Cheerific (2019)
- Kin: Matthew’s Story (2019)
- Meet the MP (2019; season 2)
- Happy Prince (2020)
- Loving You (2020)
- My Guardian Angels (2020)
- Khloe (2020)
- Titoudao: Inspired by the True Story of a Wayang Star (2020)
- The Cutting Edge (2021)
- The Ferryman: Legends Of Nanyang (2021)
- CTRL (2021)
- Mind Jumper (2021)
- Genie in a Cup (2022)
- Home Is Where the Heart Is (2022)
- Summer Wind (2022)
- Soul Detective (2022)
- Titoudao: Dawn of a New Stage (2023)
- Silent Walls (2023)
- Shero (2023)
- Till the End (2023)
- The Gift of Time (2025)

=== Film ===
- Hong Kong 1997 (1991; short film)
- Challenge of Truth (1994; telemovie)
- Fatal Memory (1995; telemovie)
- To Madam With Love (1997; telemovie)
- We Are Family (2006)
- Truth Be Told (2007)
- Autumn in March (2009)
- Recipe (2013; telemovie)
- Emily (2013; short film)
- Meeting the Giant (2014)
- Going Home (2014; short film)
- Gone Case (2014; telemovie)
- Young & Fabulous (2016)

=== Web series ===
- The Underdogs (2021; Viddsee original series)

=== Show hosting ===
- Mission Impossible (2004)

== Awards and nominations ==
Year	Award	Category	Nominated work	Result	Ref
1995	Star Awards	Most Popular Newcomer	Bond of Love	Nominated	
1997	Star Awards	Top 10 Most Popular Male Artistes	—	Nominated	
2025	Star Awards	Top 10 Most Popular Male Artistes	—	Nominated	
