= Zombiepura =

- Directed by: Jacen Tan
- Starring: Joey Pink Lai; Benjamin Heng; Alaric Tay; Chen Xiuhuan; Richard Low; Haresh Tilani
- Production companies: JAB Films; Clover Films mm2 Entertainment
- Distributed by: Shaw Organisation
- Release dates: 19 October 2018 (Scream Asia Film Festival); 25 October 2018 (Singapore)
- Running time: 83 minutes
- Country: Singapore
- Languages: English; Mandarin
- Budget: $900,000
- Box office: $359,232

Zombiepura (Chinese: 尸杀军营), is a 2018 Singaporean horror comedy film directed by Jacen Tan. The film stars Alaric Tay and Benjamin Heng. The film was the first widely released Singaporean zombie film.

== Plot ==
Lazy Corporal Tan Kayu and his friend Tarzan plan to skip guard duty by reporting sick at the medical centre, where they meet medic Chua, an old friend of Kayu. The strict Sergeant Lee Siao On comes to reprimand Kayu. At the same time, a soldier infected during an outfield exercise is brought into the medical centre and soon attacks those around him, including Tarzan. Kayu and Lee escape the medical centre with Xiao Ling, learning that the entire camp has been overrun. The trio retrieve Kayu's rifle, which he had hidden before reporting sick. After realising that the zombies act largely on muscle memory, they evade them by crossing the obstacle course.

At the camp canteen, they reunite with Xiao Ling's mother Susie, who runs the camp's military supplies store, as well as Chua and Captain Yap, who holds the keys to a vehicle that could get them out of the camp. When an infected private arrives, the increasingly paranoid Chua seizes Kayu's rifle, shoots the soldier, and locks him with Xiao Ling with the private, and Lee with Susie in another cage. Kayu briefly feints to side with Chua and Yap, before holding Yap at knifepoint to obtain the keys. Chua and Yap throw the keys towards an approaching horde before fleeing, but Kayu recovers them and frees Lee, Susie and Xiao Ling. The zombies are distracted when the national anthem begins playing, allowing the group to escape the canteen. Outside, they discover that Yap has crashed the vehicle during his attempted escape.

While rescuing Kayu from a zombie attack, Susie is bitten and infected. The group takes refuge in a storeroom, where Kayu and Lee argue over how to proceed. Xiao Ling criticises both men while trying to care for her mother, but Susie soon turns and attempts to attack her daughter. Kayu shoots the zombified Susie. Kayu, Lee and Xiao Ling then decide to reach the operations room in the headquarters building and contact Army HQ for assistance. They also discover that mosquitoes repellent repels the zombies; earlier, Xiao Ling, who had applied repellent, was spared from attack by the infected private.

Xiao Ling heads to the operations room to broadcast it over the camp's public-address system, while Kayu and Lee prepare to hold off the advancing horde. There, Xiao Ling encounters the injured Chua, who demands to know how she has managed to evade the zombies. During the ensuing struggle, the radio equipment is damaged, though not before they learn that a helicopter has been dispatched—apparently to rescue Captain Yap. Chua then forces Xiao Ling to accompany him as he attempts to reach the extraction point, while Kayu and Lee fight their way through the horde towards the camp gate.

At the gate, Chua confronts the group but is bitten and infected in the process. As Kayu tries to help him, Chua shoots Lee. Kayu then struggles with Chua for possession of the mosquito repellent. Despite being wounded, Lee assists Kayu in recovering the repellent; his dog tag protecting him from a fatal injury. Chua is subsequently overwhelmed by the pursuing horde, allowing Kayu, Lee and Xiao Ling to reach the helicopter. The aircraft is piloted by the camp's Regimental Sergeant Major (RSM), who is searching for his son, Lee.

28 hours later, Lee and Kayu are deployed on a mission to rescue other survivors of the outbreak.

== Cast ==
- Alaric Tay as Tan Kayu
- Benjamin Heng as Lee Siao On
- Joey Pink Lai as Xiao Ling
- Chen Xiuhuan as Susie
- Richard Low as Mad Dog Lee
- Haresh Tilani as Tarzan

== Production ==
In 2011, Jacen Tan pitched the idea to Alaric Tay and Benjamin Heng separately and they decided to form a production company, JAB Films, using their initials, to film a zombie outbreak in an army camp. Tan became the director while Tay and Heng were executive producers of the film.

By 2016, local film production companies mm2 Entertainment and Clover Films were convinced by them to co-produce and co-distribute the film. The Singapore Film Commission initially rejected funding the film but subsequently awarded the production the New Talent Feature Grant. The film costs $900,000 to produce.

Filming was done at an old power station and also warehouses redecorated to look like army buildings. An abandoned military Standard Obstacle Course was also used.

== Release ==
The film premiered at the 2018 Scream Asia Film Festival on 19 October. The film was released in theatres in Singapore on 25 October. The film had a limited release in Osaka and Tokyo, Japan in November 2019.

== Reception ==
Chen Yunhong of Lianhe Zaobao gave the film three stars out of five for entertainment and one star out of five for art. John Lui of The Straits Times gave the film 2.5 stars out of 5 in his review of the film, stating, "When the puzzle pieces shown in the first act come together neatly in the second, there is a tremendous sense of satisfaction. However, the third act comes and all the hard work unravels." Douglas Tseng of Today also gave the film 2.5 stars out of 5 in his review of the film, stating, "Sometimes, the action is more perspiration than inspiration, while pacing is an issue. At 83 minutes (shorter if you omit the end-credits), it still feels a tad sluggish."
