= The Faith of Anna Waters =

2016 horror film directed by Kelvin Tong

- Theatrical release poster
- Directed by: Kelvin Tong
- Written by: Kelvin Tong
- Starring: Elizabeth Rice; Matthew Settle
- Cinematography: Wade Muller
- Edited by: Olly Stothert
- Distributed by: Entertainment One
- Release dates: March 16, 2016 (Philippines); May 12, 2016 (Singapore)
- Running time: 95 minutes
- Countries: United States; Singapore

The Faith of Anna Waters is a 2016 American-Singaporean horror film starring American actors Elizabeth Rice and Matthew Settle and directed by Kelvin Tong. Billed as Singapore's first Hollywood supernatural feature, the film tells the story of an American journalist who travels to Singapore to investigate the mysterious suicide of her sister, and delves into one of Tong's favourite horror subgenres: exorcism.

The film was released on 6 May 2016 in the United States under the title The Offering.

== Plot ==
Jamie Waters, a police detective in Chicago, receives news that her sister Anna has committed suicide in Singapore. Jamie flies to Singapore and moves in to Anna’s house. Rather than go and stay with her father, Anna’s young daughter Katie is insistent that they do not leave the house because her mother has promised that she will return in seven days time. At the same time, the Catholic priest Father De Silva encounters a series of cryptic symbols that indicate that the Tower of Babel is rising again. As Jamie investigates other apparent suicides by people connected to Anna, she encounters increasingly spooky happenings all around the house.

== Cast ==
- Elizabeth Rice as Jamie Waters
- Matthew Settle as Sam Harris
- Colin Borgonon as Father James De Silva
- Adina Herz as Katie Harris
- Adrian Pang as Father Matthew Tan
- Jaymee Ong as Majorie Tan
- Pamelyn Chee as May Wong
- Tan Kheng Hua as Charlotte Sharma
- Gus Donald as Danny Crowther

== Reception ==
On the review aggregator website Rotten Tomatoes, 8% of 13 critics' reviews are positive, with an average rating of 3/10.

Chuck Bowen of Slant Magazine rate the film .5 over 4 rating and wrote: It inspires retrospective gratitude for the empty yet slick craftsmanship of someone like James Wan. Andy Webster of The New York Times gave the film a negative review and he wrote: Kelvin Tong’s "The Offering," a muddled horror film, falls over itself incorporating as many genre elements as possible. The result is the cinematic equivalent of combining every paint color on a canvas: a murky mess.

== Distribution ==
The film has been bought for distribution in France, Germany, Spain, Mexico, Hong Kong, Taiwan, Thailand and the Philippines. In Mexico the film was scheduled to have a theatrical release on July 8, 2016.
