= Rudra (band) =

Rock band from Singapore

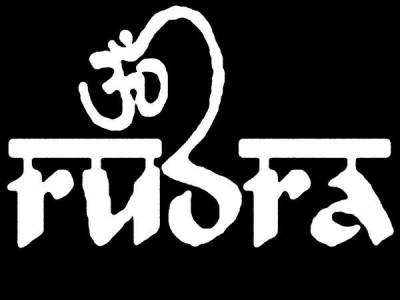
- Rudra Logo

Background information
- Origin: Singapore
- Genres: Vedic metal, avant-garde metal, blackened death metal, thrash metal, folk metal
- Years active: 1992−present
- Labels: Transcending Obscurity Asia, Awakening Records
- Members: Kathir - Vocals, Bass; Shiva - Drums; Devan - Guitars; Vinod - Guitars
- Past members: Alvin Chua; Bala; Kannan; Selvam; Simon; Subash
- Website: www.rudra.sg

Rudra is a Vedic metal band from Singapore formed in 1992. Rudra plays an avant garde blend of black metal-influenced death metal and Carnatic music. The lyrics derive from Sanskrit Vedic literature and philosophy, with ancient mantras (shlokas) incorporated into the songs.

== History ==
Kathir (bass and vocals), Shiva (drums), and Bala (guitar) formed Rudra as Rudhra in 1992. Selvam joined to supplement Bala on guitar. This line-up released the four-track demo The Past in 1994. Prior to this release, Rudhra was featured in a few underground Singaporean death metal compilation albums.

In early 1996, the band went on hiatus and the members were involved in separate bands. Towards the end of 1996, Kathir reformed Rudhra as Rudra (the most common English transliteration for the Sanskrit word). Kathir joined Shiva, Bala, and Alvin Chua before recording a self-titled debut album in late 1997, released in June 1998. The band played a couple of shows and started work on new material. The band replaced its two guitarists with Selvam (ex-member) and Kannan in January 2000.

Rudra released its second album, The Aryan Crusade, in September 2001. In January 2002, Big O magazine named this album one of the top 40 albums of the year. In July 2003, Rudra released a third album, Kurukshetra, named after a battlefield from the Mahabharata, Kurukshetra.

After touring Singapore, India, Indonesia and Thailand, Rudra released Brahmavidya: Primordial I, in April 2005. It represented exhibited more black metal influences than previous albums and a denser recording that showcases the band's progressive move into dynamic leads, complex bass-lines, and tighter, faster drumming with an emphasis on blast beats. With this release, Rudra toured the United States in January 2007.

In 2008, Kannan was replaced with Devan. In 2009, Rudra released Brahmavidya: Transcendental I as the second chapter in the Brahmavidya trilogy. They collaborated with Singaporean director Jacen Tan on the music video for "Hymns from the Blazing Chariot". In 2009, Vinod replaced Selvam.

In August 2010, Rudra headlined the first day of Baybeats, an annual three-day alternative music festival in Singapore. An extreme metal band headlining a non-metal music festival was rare. They headlined the festival again in 2012 and 2019. Musicologists have published research papers about Vedic metal and the band.

In November 2011, Rudra announced that they would close the 2011 Brahmavidya Tour by headlining the Strawberry Fields Rock Fest in Bangalore, India. It had been more than seven years since the band last played Bangalore.

In July 2011, Devan left the band to focus on his personal life. Subash joined the band officially in January 2012 to replace Devan. In 2013, Simon joined the band to replace Subash.

In August 2021, Simon left the band due to work commitments. Devan rejoined the band. Their 10th album (and 9th of all original material), Eight Mahavidyas, was released on 22 December 2022.

In 2023, the biographical book Rudra 30 Years of Vedic Metal was released.

The band announced that their 11th studio album, Antithesis, would released on 14 January 2025, via Chinese label Awakening Records.

== Discography ==
- The Past (Demo, 1995)
- Rudra (1998)
- The Aryan Crusade (2001)
- Kurukshetra (2003)
- Brahmavidya: Primordial I (2005)
- Brahmavidya: Transcendental I (2009) (Trinity Recs - Asia, Vic Records - Europe)
- Brahmavidya: Immortal I (2011)
- RTA (2013)
- Kurukshetra (Remastered) (2015)
- Enemy of Duality (2016)
- The Blackisle Sessions (2018)
- Past Life Regression (2018)
- Invoking the Gods (2019)
- Eight Mahavidyas (2022)
- Antithesis (expected in 2025)
