= It's a Great, Great World =

2011 Singaporean film

It's a Great, Great World 大世界
- Theatrical poster
- Directed by: Kelvin Tong
- Written by: Kelvin Tong; Ken Kwek; Marcus Chin
- Screenplay by: Kelvin Tong
- Music by: Alex Oh; Joe Ng
- Production company: Mediacorp Raintree Pictures
- Distributed by: Golden Village Pictures
- Release date: 27 January 2011
- Running time: 91 minutes
- Country: Singapore
- Languages: Mandarin; Hokkien; Teochew; Cantonese; Hainanese; Hakka; Shanghainese; English; Thai

It's a Great, Great World (Chinese: 大世界; pinyin: dà shì jiè; Pe̍h-ōe-jī: tōa sè-kài) is a Singaporean film directed by Kelvin Tong. It is set in the Great World Amusement Park and was released in Singapore cinemas on 27 January 2011. The film features an ensemble cast of local singers, established MediaCorp artistes, a number of celebrities from Hong Kong and Taiwan and getai group "Babes in the City". A notable feature of the film is the heavy use of the various Chinese languages native to the Singaporean Chinese population, including Hokkien, Teochew, Cantonese, Hakka, and Hainanese. Many actors had lines of dialogue in languages they were not familiar with.

== Plot ==
=== Prologue ===
On 12 November 2010, photographer Min was helping their staffs clearing up Brilliant Pearl photographic studio for the closure before her trip to Japan. While retrieving vintage photos, she found a paper note dated back on 15 December 1978, the day of the closure of Great World Amusement Park coinciding the relocation of Brilliant Pearl; her uncle Wen recalled that it was written by her mother's old friend Goh Ah Beng, a former employer of Great World; she found his residential address through the phonebook. She paid a visit to Goh and showed some pictures.

=== Boo's photo ===
On 15 February 1958, British-American celebrity Elizabeth Taylor visited Great World. Boo, a clown, was excited to meet her; however, his employer Tiger, rejected his leave; several employees resigned in protest of Boo, allowing him an opportunity to meet Taylor. The photographer took a picture of Taylor kissing a baby, whereas Boo obstructed the view to depict that Taylor kissed him, impressing his mother.

Tiger retired from his career afterwards, and his show was renamed to Tiny Tot's. Min recall Goh was the owner selling lok-lok until the park's closure which led to his eventual retirement. While Min help Goh repair the fan, she showed a second photo.

=== Meijuan's photo ===
Taken before Singapore's independence, Meijuan, a patron who helped Goh's business, worked in carnival shooting, One night, Leong suddenly kissed her as a method to avoid detection while hiding from his father Yeo, a liniment businessman, and on the next day, he invited her a ride aboard haunted train, where he was mocked for being cowardice. Ting, her colleague, told that the Yeo's will be moving back to Malaysia and the liniment was selling fast; Meijuan visited his stall only to find it was vacated, before seeing a television screen about Lee Kuan Yew making his proclamation.

A year later, Leong, now an officer and Singaporean, came back to see Meijuan and began their relationship. A factory producing liniments was formed upon their marriage, and was still operational. Min showed another picture which Goh quickly recognizes.

=== Rose's photo ===
Henry returned to Singapore to meet Rose, a famed performer at Flamingo for the first time in a decade; she gave a performance of "Rose, Rose, I Love You" despite an earlier mishap and a scolding from her manager Peter. After her performance, she reveals her relationship after seeing Henry; he revealed on his experience being detained in Thailand for five years until the government's release. He then introduced his family of two children before leaving on his trip to Indonesia, leaving Rose to tender her resignation; however, her audience's ovation and Peter's insistence led her to continue performing until the closure; Rose starts a relationship with Peter.

Goh further noted how television and supermarkets did contribute to the closure of Flamingo. After Min finished repairing the fan, she showed another picture; Goh becomes emotional, before revealing that it was their wedding photo.

=== The wedding photo ===
On the day of the bombing during World War II, Goh and his mute wife, Lian, were newlyweds and enjoyed a wedding dinner at Wing Choon Yuen (now called Spring Court). Several of Goh's relatives and guests became impatient due to the head cooks slacking, where their manager, Molly, reprimanded them. After the delivery man came to deliver fish, their cooks and patrons noticed a disturbance; an elderly came to inform that the Japanese forces had bombed Keppel Harbour. Frightened, but not in despair despite a power outage, the chefs diligently cooked their dishes and informed the patrons to prepare for the eventual event that was about to come. Lian then shared her feelings with Goh.

Goh revealed that Lian was killed during the Japanese's occupation, and thanked Min for finding the photo. Goh reminded that these stories were in the past and eventually forget.

=== Epilogue ===
Min returned to the studio only to discover it was empty, as the photos have been moved. A family then arrived at the studio, prompting a passport photo for their daughter, which Min complied. Min cancels her trip in favour of Brilliant Pearl's legacy and business.

== Cast ==
Wraparound Story

- Yvonne Lim as Tan Ah Huay
- Ben Yeo as Ah Siong
- Olivia Ong as Ah Min
- Nancy Sit as Mrs Tan
- Anna Lin Ruping as Ah Beng's neighbour
- Chew Chor Meng as Goh Ah Beng
- Emma Yong as Mother at Photo Studio

Boo's photo

- Henry Thia as Ah Boo
- Lai Meng as Ah Boo's mother
- Chen Tianwen as a Bellboy
- Tay Yin Yin as Ang Moh
- Sam Tseng as Tiger
- Gurmit Singh as a Security Guard
- Kelly Schuster as Elizabeth Taylor

Meijuan's photo

- Joanne Peh as Mei Juan
- John Cheng as Yeo, an oil seller
- Zhang Zhenhuan as Ah Leong, Yeo's son
- Justin Ang as an Ah Beng
- Ng Hui as Ah Ting
- Zheng Geping as ghost train ride operator

Rose's photo

- Xiang Yun as Rose
- Paige Chua as Mu Dan
- Babes in the City
- Huang Wenyong as Peter
- Guo Liang as Henry
- Vincent Tee as Towkay at Nightclub

The wedding photo

- Chen Shucheng as Towkay Lim
- Apple Hong as Lim Bee Lian
- Bryan Wong as Ah Kiang
- Zhang Yaodong as Ah Dong
- Marcus Chin as Ah Chuen (head chef)
- Kym Ng as Molly
- Ix Shen as Delivery Man
- Dennis Chew as Aunty Lucy
- Kimberly Chia as Ah Luan
- Benjamin Heng as Ah Ting's boyfriend
- Ken Kwek as Kitchen Helper

== Reception ==
As at 21 February 2011, the movie has earned more than S$2 million at the Singapore box office and attained viewership of 250,000.

== See also ==
- Great World Amusement Park
