= When Hainan Meets Teochew =

- Directed by: Han Yew Kwang
- Written by: Han Yew Kwang
- Produced by: Lau Chee Nien
- Starring: Lee Chau Min; Tan Hong Chye; Yeo Yann Yann; Alaric Tay; Catherine Sng; Soundarajan Jeeva
- Cinematography: Long Fei Liu
- Edited by: Grace Xiao
- Music by: Neil Lim
- Production company: 18g Pictures
- Release date: 3 December 2010
- Running time: 81 minutes
- Country: Singapore
- Languages: Mandarin; English; Hainanese; Teochew
- Budget: $10,000

When Hainan Meets Teochew (Chinese: 当海南遇上潮州) is a 2010 Singaporean romantic comedy film directed by Han Yew Kwang, starring Lee Chau Min, Tan Hong Chye, Yeo Yann Yann, Alaric Tay, Catherine Sng and Soundarajan Jeeva. It follows an effeminate man falling in love with a masculine woman.

== Cast ==
- Lee Chau Min as Hainan
- Tan Hong Chye as Teochew
- Yeo Yann Yann as Meihui
- Alaric Tay as Ah Guang
- Catherine Sng as Hainan's mother
- Soundarajan Jeeva as Teochew's landlord

== Release ==
The film premiered at The Arts House on 3 December 2010.

== Reception ==
John Lui of The Straits Times wrote: "At times gaudily surrealistic, and at other moments down-to-earth, the movie showcases Han's command of both kitsch and kitchen-sink drama. What shines through is his voice: laconic, deadpan, warm and always entertaining."

Li Yiyun of the Lianhe Zaobao rated the film 3.5 stars out of 5 for entertainment and 3 stars out of 5 for artistry.
