= A Romance in Shanghai =

- Written by: Jiang Long; Ying Tang
- Directed by: Zhijie Deng
- Country of origin: China; Singapore
- Original language: Mandarin
- No. of episodes: 5

Production
- Producer: Guangrong Huang
- Production location: China
- Cinematography: Sei-Kwong Tung
- Editor: Zhenjiang Lai
- Running time: 45 min.

Original release
- Release: 13 June 1996

A Romance in Shanghai (Chinese: 新上海假期; pinyin: Xīn Shànghǎi Jiàqī) is a modern television serial jointly produced by MediaCorp (Media Corporation of Singapore) and a China television production company. Starring Singaporean actress Fann Wong in her first non-Singaporean production, the serial is set in modern-day Shanghai where she plays a rich girl on holiday in the romantic city to reunite with her American-based Singaporean boyfriend (played by Bernard Tan). When she discovers he has been unfaithful to her, she seeks solace in the company of a Shanghainese divorcee (played by Chinese actor He Yan).

== Cast ==
- Fann Wong - Jian Ni
- He Yan - Liu Liwen
- Bernard Tan - Peter
- Shen Min - Ye Xinli
- Shao Min - Casey
