= Shirkers =

2018 documentary film by Sandi Tan

- Directed by: Sandi Tan
- Written by: Sandi Tan
- Produced by: Sandi Tan; Jessica Levin; Maya Rudolph
- Cinematography: Iris Ng
- Edited by: Lucas Celler; Sandi Tan; Kimberley Hassett
- Music by: Ishai Adar
- Distributed by: Netflix
- Release date: January 2018 (Sundance)
- Running time: 96 minutes
- Countries: Singapore; United Kingdom; United States
- Language: English

Shirkers is a 2018 British-American documentary film by Singapore-born filmmaker Sandi Tan about the making of an independent thriller featuring a teenage assassin set in Singapore. It premiered at the 2018 Sundance Film Festival in January and won the World Cinema Documentary Directing Award, making her the second Singapore-born filmmaker after Kirsten Tan (Pop Aye, 2017) to win an award at the festival. It was also nominated for the Gotham Independent Film Award for Best Documentary.

Shirkers was released on October 26, 2018, on Netflix.

== Synopsis ==
In the summer of 1992, 19-year-old Sandi Tan, alongside friends Jasmine Ng and Sophia Siddique, as well as film teacher and mentor Georges Cardona, shot the independent film Shirkers, which would have made it Singapore's first road movie. The footage showed lots of promise and big things were expected of the finished result. After wrapping, Tan, Ng, and Siddique left the footage with Cardona as the trio went to study abroad for college. However, Cardona disappeared with the footage and the trio never saw him again; Tan did receive two brief, inconsequential taped messages via snail mail.

On September 11, 2011, four years after Cardona's death in 2007, Cardona's ex-wife emailed Tan (who by now was a novelist living in Los Angeles), informing her that she was in possession of the footage for Shirkers, minus the audio tracks. In the proceeding years, Tan decided to digitize the footage and use it to make something new: a documentary about the process of creating, and then losing, the original 1992 film.

Interviews were conducted in 2015 with Tan's friends, people involved with the making of Shirkers, and people who knew Cardona. The interviewees were Sophia Siddique Harvey, Jasmine Ng, Sharon Siddique, Philip Cheah, Ben Harrison, Foo Fung Liang, Pohshon Choy, Tay Yek Keak, Grace Dane Mazur, Stephen Tyler, and Georges Cardona's ex-wife.

== Georges Cardona ==
Around 1976 in New Orleans, Georges Cardona, a John F. Kennedy High School attendee, photography mentor to David Duke, and Vietnam War veteran, opened Lighthouse Media Center (a franchisee of Cambridge, Massachusetts-based Super-8 Sound, a retrofitter of Beaulieu Super 8 film cameras). Cardona was the cinematographer for some of David Duke's electoral campaign commercials and, in New Orleans in 1988, for Stephen Tyler's The Last Slumber Party.

== Reception ==
=== Critical reception ===
On Rotten Tomatoes, the film holds an approval rating of 99% based on 70 reviews, with an average rating of 8.3/10. The site's consensus reads: "Shirkers uses one woman's interrogation of a pivotal personal disappointment to offer affecting observations on creativity, lost opportunity, and coming to terms with the past." On Metacritic, the film has a weighted average score of 88 out of 100 based on 20 critics, indicating "universal acclaim"; it is labeled as a "Metacritic must-see".

Citing the film as one of his favorites at Sundance, Nick Allen of RogerEbert.com wrote a rave review for Shirkers, saying that "Tan presents her multifaceted life story—vibrant, unbelievable, and full of such incredible women—as a dazzling tapestry that’s unlike many narrative or documentary films."

=== Accolades ===
Award	Date of ceremony	Category	Recipient(s)	Result	Ref.
Alliance of Women Film Journalists Awards	January 10, 2019	Best Documentary	Sandi Tan	Nominated	
Austin Film Critics Association Awards	January 18, 2019	Best Documentary	Shirkers	Nominated	
Cinema Eye Honors	January 10, 2019	Outstanding Achievement in a Debut Feature Film	Sandi Tan	Nominated	
Cinema Eye Honors	January 10, 2019	Outstanding Achievement in Direction	Sandi Tan	Nominated	
Cinema Eye Honors	January 10, 2019	Outstanding Achievement in Original Music Score	Ishai Adar	Won	
Cinema Eye Honors	January 10, 2019	Outstanding Achievement in Graphic Design or Animation	Sandi Tan and Lucas Celler	Won	
Cinema Eye Honors	January 10, 2019	Audience Choice Prize	Sandi Tan	Nominated	
Cinema Eye Honors	January 10, 2019	The Unforgettables	Georges Cardona, Sophia Siddique Harvey, Jasmine Kin Kia Ng, and Sandi Tan	Won	
Dorian Awards	January 12, 2019	Documentary of the Year	Shirkers	Nominated	
Florida Film Critics Circle Awards	December 21, 2018	Best Documentary Film	Shirkers	Won	
Golden Reel Awards	February 17, 2019	Outstanding Achievement in Sound Editing – Feature Documentary	Lawrence Everson and Cindy Takehara Ferruccio	Nominated	
Gotham Independent Film Awards	November 26, 2018	Best Documentary	Shirkers	Nominated	
Gotham Independent Film Awards	November 26, 2018	Audience Award	Shirkers	Nominated	
Independent Spirit Awards	February 23, 2019	Best Documentary Feature	Sandi Tan, Jessica Levin, and Maya E. Rudolph	Nominated	
International Cinephile Society Awards	February 3, 2019	Best Documentary	Shirkers	Nominated	
Los Angeles Film Critics Association Awards	December 9, 2018	Best Documentary/Nonfiction Film	Shirkers	Won	
National Society of Film Critics Awards	January 5, 2019	Best Non-Fiction Film	Shirkers	Runner-up	
Online Film Critics Society Awards	January 2, 2019	Best Documentary Film	Shirkers	Nominated	
Peabody Awards	May 18, 2019	Documentary	Shirkers	Nominated	
Philadelphia Film Festival Awards	October 28, 2018	Best Documentary Feature	Shirkers	Won	
San Francisco Bay Area Film Critics Circle Awards	December 9, 2018	Best Documentary	Shirkers	Nominated	
Seattle Film Critics Society Awards	December 17, 2018	Best Documentary Feature	Sandi Tan	Nominated	
Sundance Film Festival	January 27, 2019	World Cinema Documentary Directing Award	Sandi Tan	Won	
Women Film Critics Circle Awards	December 11, 2018	Best Documentary by or About Women	Shirkers	Runner-up	

== See also ==
- Cinema of Singapore
- Guerrilla filmmaking
- Cinephilia
