= Lucas Celler =

American documentary film editor

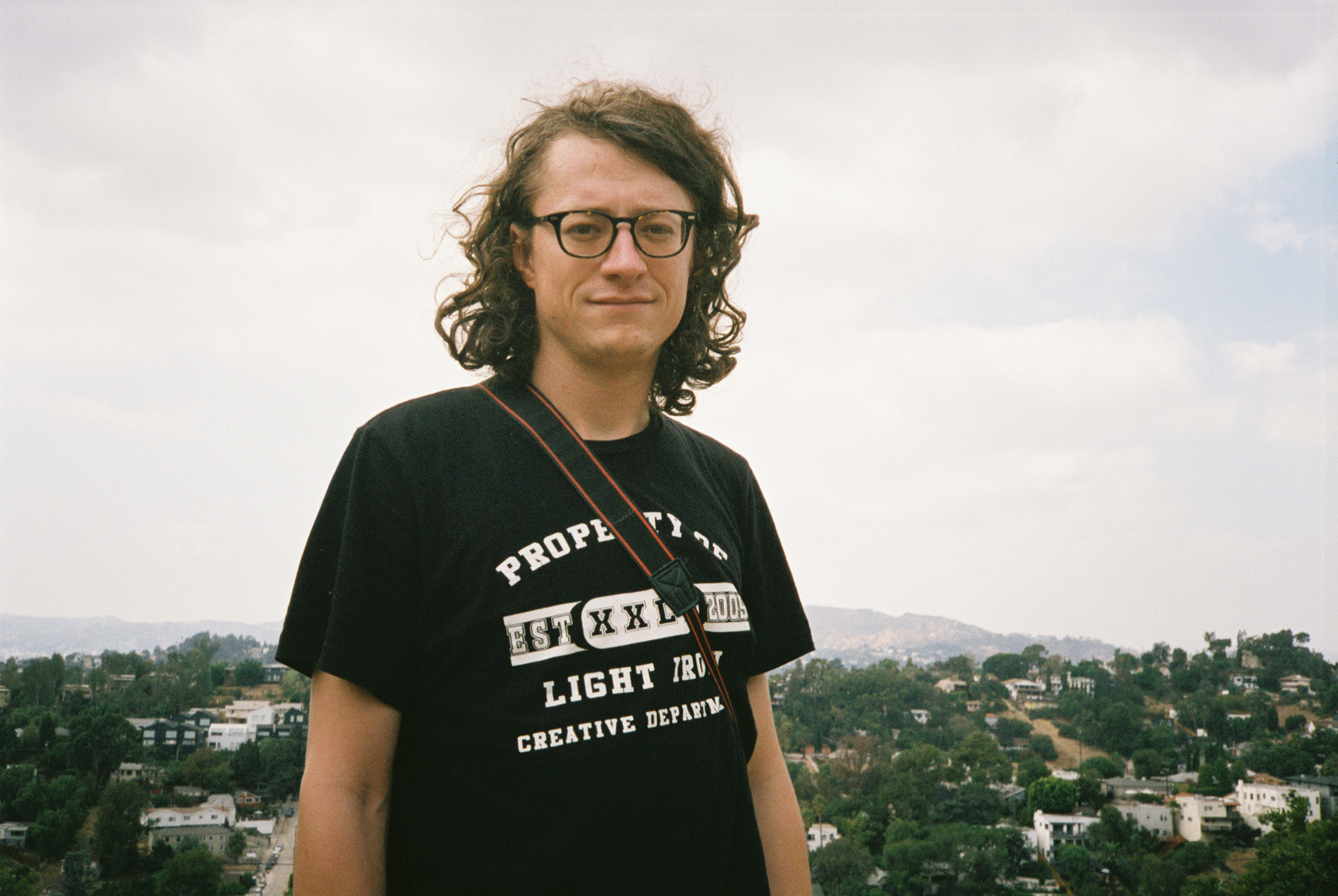
- Born: U.S.
- Occupation(s): Editor, director, photographer, motion designer
- Years active: 2013 – present

Lucas Celler is an American documentary film editor, director, photographer and motion designer. He is best known for his work on Shirkers and Claydream.

== Life and career ==
Lucas went to New Trier High School and Depaul University's School of Cinematic Arts in Chicago. He then moved to Los Angeles to intern for Chris Hanley. He served as assistant editor on Jeff Feuerzeig's Author: The JT LeRoy Story. He got his start editing feature documentary film on Shirkers which won him the Cinema Eye Honors Award for Outstanding Achievement in Graphic Design.

== Filmography ==
Year	Title	Contribution	Note
2013	The Gasoline Party	Editor, director, writer and producer	Short film
2013	Dean Wareham: Love Is Colder Than Death	Editor, director and producer	Video short
2016	Own the Nite	Editor, director, writer and producer	Documentary
2018	Shirkers	Editor, motion designer	Documentary
2018	Olompali: A Hippie Odyssey	Editor, motion designer	Documentary
2020	Awkward Family Photos	Editor	Documentary
2021	Claydream	Editor, motion designer	Documentary

== Awards and nominations ==
Year	Result	Award	Category	Work	Ref.
2019	Won	Cinema Eye Honors	Outstanding Achievement in Graphic Design or Animation	Shirkers	
