= Eating Air =

1999 Singaporean film

- Theatrical release poster
- Traditional Chinese: 吃風
- Simplified Chinese: 吃风
- Literal meaning: “Having a good time” in Hokkien slang
- Hanyu Pinyin: Chī fēng
- Hokkien POJ: Jiak hong
- Directed by: Kelvin Tong; Jasmine Ng
- Written by: Kelvin Tong; Jasmine Ng
- Produced by: Loraine Frugniet; Mabelyn Ow
- Starring: Benjamin Heng; Alvina Toh
- Cinematography: Lucas Jodogne; Mary Van Kets
- Edited by: Jasmine Ng
- Music by: Joe Ng; Seens; Jason Tan; Nigel Woodford
- Production companies: YTC Pictures; Multi-Story Complex
- Distributed by: United International Pictures
- Release date: 9 December 1999
- Running time: 107 minutes
- Country: Singapore
- Languages: Mandarin; Hokkien; English; Malay
- Budget: S$800,000

Eating Air (Chinese: 吃風) is a 1999 Singaporean action romantic drama film directed by Kelvin Tong and Jasmine Ng, starring Benjamin Heng and Alvina Toh as two disaffected teenagers who are in love and about their days of being wild and crazy. Billed as "a motorcycle kung-fu love story", the directorial feature debut of Tong and Ng has since been considered a cult classic among the local film community.

== Synopsis ==
A young man loves spending his time cruising the streets on his motorcycle and imagines himself as a martial arts hero. He falls in love with a quiet, withdrawn student who works in a photocopy shop by day and sells newspapers with her mother at night. The young man's carefree life changes when his best friend gets into trouble with the underworld triads and he feels obligated to shoulder the responsibilities with him.

== Cast ==
- Benjamin Heng as Ah Boy
- Alvina Toh as Ah Girl
- Joseph Cheong as Ah Gu
- Ferris Yeo as Chao Helang
- Andy Chng as Aw Tau
- Mark Lee as Lao Beng
- Michelle Chong as Posche
- Deborah Png as Ah Girl's mother
- Kit Chan as Mysterious girl

== Accolades ==
Year	Awards	Category	Recipient	Result	Ref.
2000	Singapore International Film Festival	Young Cinema Award	Kelvin Tong and Jasmine Ng	Won	
