= Tak Giu =

Short film

Tak Giu, an indie short film about Singaporean football, gained a cult-following and gathered 100,000 viewers in 6 months after it was hosted on the internet. Shot with just a camcorder, Tak Giu spread like wild-fire and made waves in the Singaporean football and online community. The 15min film in Singlish, English and Mandarin was produced, written and directed by Jacen Tan, who also starred in the film.

The film talks about the lack of soccer fields in soccer crazy Singapore and difficulties of finding suitable fields in land scarce Singapore. It also laments Singaporeans' lack of support for their national soccer and the futility of Singapore's 2010 World Cup goal.

Aside from being mentioned in prominent blogs and internet portals, Tak Giu was featured on local newspapers like The Straits Times, The New Paper, and Today. Jacen Tan was also invited to appear on TV programs like ESPN “Football Crazy”, “LiveWire” on Arts Central, Radio UFM 100.3 on the late Show with DJ Yuling, and News 93.8fm. It was shown in the CINEKATIPUNAN film fest in Philippines.

== Critical response ==
Jeremy Sing of sinema liken the short film to "the ‘Money No Enough’ of the soccer world, where 3 characters come together" and that it had "succeeded in capturing the hearts of many online viewers".
