= Stepping Out (Singaporean TV series) =

- Title card
- 出路
- Genre: Period drama
- Written by: Ang Eng Tee 洪荣狄; Ng Kah Huay 黄佳华
- Directed by: Chia Meng Yang 谢敏洋; Loo Yin Kam 卢燕金; Tay Peck Choo 郑碧珠; Su Miao Fang 苏妙芳
- Starring: Xie Shaoguang; Cynthia Koh; Ivy Lee; Tay Ping Hui; Terence Cao; Yvonne Lim
- Opening theme: 我吃得起苦 by Power Station
- Country of origin: Singapore
- Original language: Mandarin
- No. of episodes: 30

Production
- Producer: Kok Len Shoong
- Running time: 45 minutes approximately(Not including commercial breaks)

Original release
- Network: TCS 8th Frequency (Now MediaCorp TV Channel 8)
- Release: 1999

Stepping Out (Chinese: 出路) is a 1999 Singaporean Mandarin drama series adapted from Stepping Out: The Making Of Chinese Entrepreneurs by Chan Kwok Bun and Claire Chiang See Ngoh.

It reran several times like in 2006, 2019 and in 2021. It stars Xie Shaoguang, Cynthia Koh, Ivy Lee, Tay Ping Hui, Terence Cao and Yvonne Lim as the casts of the series.

The series focuses on the Chinese immigrant experience in Singapore, and their rough, hard ascent (along with the rest of Singapore) to the present state of wealth and riches that is unprecedented in Singaporean history. The drama begins in China and spans roughly three decades. It was produced following the success of the 1997 period drama The Price of Peace.

The story begins at the start of the Chinese Civil War during the 1920s. The chaos and upheaval which entailed caused many Chinese to migrate to Southeast Asia, mainly Malaysia and Singapore, and sets the background for the series. The Hock Lee bus riots and Chinese middle schools riots of the 1950s were referenced and clips of the actual incidents were shown.

== Plot ==
It is the 1920s, a time of great chaos in China. Poverty was rampant in many regions, forcing many people to seek their fortune in the fabled Southern region known collectively as Nanyang. The story begins with three young men from the Fujian province.

A poor oyster collector named Chen Xia wishes to marry his childhood sweetheart, Hong Dou (Cynthia Koh), but struggles to make ends meet.

The son of a wealthy tea plantation owner, Jia Fu (Xie Shaoguang) is a wastrel. Lazy and childish, the only saving grace to his character is his thoughtless generosity. In his naivete he loses his inheritance and is left with nothing but the support of his industrious wife, Ju (Ivy Lee).

After Tian's (Chunyu Shanshan) father dies on the trip to Nanyang, his widowed mother and his two siblings are forced to live a life of scavenging for food in the wilderness. After his sister is killed and his brother goes missing, he is hired by a rich merchant. His new employer is cruel and his meekness makes him an easy target for bullying, but he finds himself attracted to the man's second wife, Hai Yan (Yvonne Lim).

Despite the disparity between their situations and personalities, they each find themselves making the trip to the port of Singapore in Nanyang all with the same purpose: To seek a way out of their circumstances and a better future.

== Cast ==
- Xie Shaoguang as Zhang Jiafu
- Terence Cao as Chen Xia
- Cynthia Koh as Hongdou
- Tay Ping Hui as Liu Mei
- Yvonne Lim as Hai Yan
- Ivy Lee as Ah Ju
- Chunyu Shanshan
- Chen Huihui

== Production ==
The series' producer is Kok Len Shoong.

== Accolades ==
Organisation	Year	Category	Nominee	Result	Ref
Star Awards	1999	Best Actor	Terence Cao	Nominated	
Star Awards	1999	Best Actor	Xie Shaoguang	Won	
Star Awards	1999	Best Actress	Cynthia Koh	Won	
Star Awards	1999	Best Actress	Ivy Lee	Nominated	
Star Awards	1999	Best Supporting Actor	Tay Ping Hui	Won	
Star Awards	1999	Best Supporting Actor	Chunyu Shanshan	Nominated	
Star Awards	1999	Best Supporting Actress	Yvonne Lim	Nominated	
Star Awards	1999	Best Supporting Actress	Chen Huihui	Nominated	
Star Awards	1999	Best Drama Serial	Stepping Out	Won	
Star Awards	1999	Best Theme Song	"我吃得起苦" by Power Station	Won	
Star Awards	2007	Top 5 Favourite Dramas 最喜爱的五大连续剧	—N/a	Won Top 5	

Preceded by Stand by Me; 1998	Star Awards for Best Drama Serial; Stepping Out; 1999	Succeeded by Hainan Kopi Tales; 2000
