= Truth Be Told (2007 film) =

2007 Singaporean film

- Theatrical release poster
- Chinese: 真相
- Literal meaning: "The Truth"
- Hanyu Pinyin: Zhēnxiàng
- Directed by: Teo Eng Tiong
- Screenplay by: Lim Jen Nee
- Produced by: Lim Jen Nee; Teo Eng Tiong
- Starring: Yvonne Lim; Bernard Tan; Liang Tian; Steven Woon; Luis Lim
- Cinematography: Amandi Wong
- Edited by: Alicia Law
- Music by: Tay Chee Wei
- Production company: Pilgrim Pictures
- Distributed by: Golden Village Pictures
- Release date: 28 September 2007
- Running time: 89 minutes
- Country: Singapore
- Languages: Mandarin; English; Teochew; Hokkien; Cantonese
- Budget: S$500,000

Truth Be Told (Chinese: 真相) is a 2007 Singaporean drama film directed by Teo Eng Tiong and written by Lim Jen Nee, a husband-and-wife team. It tells the story of Renee, a television presenter who returns to her home in Tiong Bahru Estate, only to be confronted by a former neighbour who threatens to reveal the past she wants buried. The film stars Yvonne Lim, Bernard Tan, Liang Tian, Steven Woon and Luis Lim. It was theatrically released on 28 September 2007.

== Plot ==
As a television presenter struggles to conceal her real identity in order to complete an assignment in the neighbourhood she ran away from 10 years ago, she is forced to confront her past.

== Cast ==
- Yvonne Lim as Renee Donovan / Ling Ling
- Bernard Tan as Damien
- Liang Tian as Old Teo
- Steven Woon as Seng
- Luis Lim as Mr. Tan
- Fish Chaar as Fake loan shark

== Production ==
The film was shot at Block 33 in the old Taman Ho Swee Estate, where director Teo Eng Tiong had lived for 30 years. Filming took a total of 18 days.

== Awards and nominations ==
Awards	Category	Recipient	Result	Ref.
Rome Asian Film Festival	Best Original Film	Truth Be Told	Won	
