= Men in White (2007 film) =

2007 Singaporean film

- Theatrical release poster
- Directed by: Kelvin Tong
- Written by: Kelvin Tong
- Produced by: Kat Goh
- Starring: Shaun Chen; Ling Lee; Alice Lim; Ben Yeong; Xavier Teo; David Aw
- Cinematography: Lucas Jodogne
- Edited by: Yim Mun Chong
- Music by: Joe Ng; Alex Oh
- Production companies: Boku Films; Innoform Media
- Release date: 6 June 2007
- Running time: 88 minutes
- Country: Singapore
- Languages: Mandarin; English; Hokkien
- Budget: $500,000
- Box office: $500,315

Men in White (Chinese: 鬼啊鬼啊) is a 2007 Singaporean horror comedy film directed by Kelvin Tong. Filming for the film began in late 2006. It is mostly in Mandarin and English, and has some Hokkien. It satirises several aspects of Singaporean life.

== Plot ==
Five Singaporeans - a housewife, a gangster girl, two rappers and a badminton player - die on the same day and become ghosts.

== Cast ==
- Shaun Chen as Ah Boon
- Ling Lee as Wan Yi
- Alice Lim
- Ben Yeung as Hop
- Xavier Teo as Hip
- David Aw
- Benjamin Heng
- Adrian Pang
- Ix Shen
- Wang Xiong
- Lawrence Wong as Ah Huat
- Dennis Chew as himself
- Han Yew Kwang as Ghost in police lineup
- Siau Jia Hui

== Release ==
A preview of the film was held on 5 June 2007 for charity. The film was released in theatres in Japan on 6 June. The film had an underwhelming performance at the box office.

== Reception ==
Jeanmarie Tan of The New Paper gave the movie two-and-a-half stars out of five. Jiang Jinyu of Lianhe Zaobao criticised the film's characters, while praising the acting. Hong Mingua of Lianhe Zaobao also gave the film a negative review. Li Yiyun of Lianhe Zaobao gave the film two stars out of five for entertainment and two stars out of five for art. Geoffrey Eu of The Business Times rated the movie C−.
