= Rule No. 1 =

2008 Hong Kong-Singaporean film by Kelvin Tong

Rule #1
- Film poster
- Traditional Chinese: 第一誡
- Simplified Chinese: 第一诫
- Hanyu Pinyin: Dì Yī Jiè
- Jyutping: Dai6 Jat1 Gaai3
- Directed by: Kelvin Tong
- Screenplay by: Kelvin Tong
- Story by: Kelvin Tong; John Powers
- Produced by: Lam Tak; Candy Leung
- Starring: Shawn Yue; Ekin Cheng; Stephanie Che; Fiona Xie
- Cinematography: Venus Keung
- Edited by: Azrael Chung
- Music by: Joe Ng; Alex Oh
- Distributed by: Fortune Star Entertainment
- Release date: 4 September 2008
- Running time: 95 minutes
- Countries: Hong Kong; Singapore
- Language: Cantonese
- Box office: US$932,596

Rule #1 is a 2008 horror film directed by Kelvin Tong and starring Shawn Yue, Ekin Cheng, Stephanie Che and Fiona Xie. The film is co-produced by Hong Kong and Singapore.

== Plot ==
While on duty during an assignment, police sergeant Lee Kwok-keung shot and killed Chan Fuk-loi, a serial killer, after Chan crippled his four limbs. When Lee woke up in hospital 49 days later, the police refused to recognise his testimony because it contained information about the supernatural. His superior then transferred him to the Miscellaneous Affairs Department so that he would be on light duty.

Unlike the heroic duty of fighting crime and protecting citizens, the Miscellaneous Affairs deals with unusual cases, which is intriguing and makes people feel lost. The head of the Miscellaneous Affairs, Inspector Wong Yiu-fai, is an eccentric and beer-guzzling man. Wong and Lee work together for the Miscellaneous Affairs to solve an unusual request: to eliminate the fear of every citizen seeking help. While carrying out their duties, Wong pretentiously tells Lee the first commandment of the Miscellaneous Affairs: There are no ghosts in this world! In fact, this first commandment is just a lie. The primary task for the Miscellaneous Affairs of dealing unusual cases is to conceal supernatural incidents to the community to reduce social panic.

Just when Wong and Lee take over the case of the Saint Austina High School massacre, Chan Fuk-loi's ghost possesses Lee's wife, May, while Lee was also possessed later. The possessed Lee shoots and kills Wong and other colleagues and then makes up his own story to deceive the police.

== Cast ==
- Shawn Yue as Sergeant Lee Kwok-keung
- Ekin Cheng as Inspector Wong Yiu-fai
- Stephanie Che as Esther
- Fiona Xie as May
- Renee Lee as Siu-man
- Bill Liu as Telephone
- Gloria Wong as Woman on bus
- Tsui Hing-wah as Man on bus
- Ben Yuen as Chan Fuk-loi
- Leung Tse-yan as Girl in car trunk
- Ng Siu-kong as DCP Lau
- Alex To as Harold
- Poon Cheuk-ming as Swimming Pool Guard
- Yu Sin-man as Ghost in swimming pool
- Choi Ka-po as Lam Siu-yuk
- Tsang Yuk-kuen as Nursing Home Matron
- Chow Chi-sing as Bartender
- Tsui Kwai-san as Cinema Caretaker
- Ng Fung-ming as Real Estate Agent
- Chan Ching-yee as Winnie Lai
- Lee Pui-san as Gillian
- Cheng Lai-pung as Doctor Au Chi-wai
- Ivy Lau as Nurse
- Jordon Ho as Coroner
- Ho Chi-wai as Rude Policeman
- Wong Kam-tong as Pig Farmer
- Leung Suk-fun as Pig Farmer's wife
- Wong Lo-yiu as Kwok Siu-lan
- Chow Suk-wai as Policewoman
- Helen Lee as Teacher Lee
- Vanessa Tuan as School girl # 1
- Mo Kai-lai as School girl # 2
- Chan Yu-yan as School girl # 3

== Awards and nominations ==
- 2008 Puchon International Fantastic Film Festival
  - Won: Best Actor (Shawn Yue, Ekin Cheng)
  - Nominated: Best of Puchon (Kelvin Tong)
- 2009 Singapore International Film Festival
  - Won: Silver Screen Award for Best Singapore Film (Kelvin Tong)
