= Dance Dance Dragon =

- Theatrical release poster
- Directed by: Kat Goh
- Written by: Kelvin Tong; Marcus Chin
- Produced by: Man Shu Sum; Kelvin Tong; Sock Ling; Leon Tong; Hui Hui
- Starring: Lai Meng; Kym Ng; Dennis Chew; Adrian Pang; Melvin Sia
- Music by: Alex Oh; Joe Ng
- Production company: Mediacorp Raintree Pictures
- Distributed by: Cathay
- Release date: 19 January 2012
- Running time: 93 minutes
- Country: Singapore
- Languages: Mandarin Chinese with some Teochew, Hokkien and Singlish dialogue
- Budget: $1.2 million

Dance Dance Dragon (Chinese: 龙众舞; pinyin: lóng zhòng wǔ) is a Singaporean comedy film from Mediacorp Raintree Pictures and Golden Village Pictures that was released for Chinese New Year on 19 January 2012 in Singapore and in March in Malaysia. It is MediaCorp Raintree Pictures's last film. It was produced by most of the production team of It's a Great, Great World. The cast includes artistes from both Singapore and Malaysia.

== Plot ==
As Chinese New Year 2012 marks the year of the Dragon, the film explores the Chinese's age-old obsession with the Dragon and having children on a "Dragon year" (see Chinese zodiac). In the introduction, Ah Long (Melvin Sia) tells about how his father (Zheng Geping) was desperate to have a son born in the Dragon year because his ancestors had decreed that only a "Dragon boy" could take over the family's Dragon Dance Association, known as Long Zhong Wu Dragon Dance and Lion Dance Association (龙众舞舞龙舞狮团). His mother (younger, Pan Lingling and older, Lai Meng) instead gives birth to "Dragon girls" while Ah Long himself was born several seconds after the clock struck twelve, making him a "Snake baby", much to the disappointment of his father.

At present time, Mother Long prays to the gods for blessings on her three children and pours out her desire for a grandchild. The oldest daughter Lucy, 48, is a spinster and can't find suitable work. The second daughter Ah Bee, 36, is a gambling addiction counselor who is tomboyish and was recently dumped by her boyfriend. The youngest and only son Ah Long is married but is terrified of children.

Meanwhile, up in heaven, the gods are growing sick and tired of hearing Mother Long's daily prayers for a grandchild and deliberate whether to grant Mother Long her wish.

== Cast ==
- Lai Meng
- Kym Ng as Long Ah Bee
- Dennis Chew as Lucy Long
- Adrian Pang as Eric Tan
- Melvin Sia as Ah Long
- Zheng Geping
- Pan Lingling
- Belinda Lee as midwife
- Bryan Wong as Uncle Teck
- Chen Huihui
- Marcus Chin as Ah Gui
- John Cheng as Ah Gao
- Brandon Wong
- Patricia Mok
- Dawn Yeoh as Ah Long’s wife
