= An Enchanted Life =

An Enchanted Life (Chinese: 钻石情缘) is a Singaporean Chinese drama that was telecast on Singapore's free-to-air channel, MediaCorp TV Channel 8. This show made its debut on 9 October 2006 and made ended its run on 1 December 2006. The show consists of a total of 20 episodes. The theme song of the show is Hui Gu Niang.

== Cast ==
=== Main cast ===
- Yvonne Lim as Li Shan Qi
- Pierre Png as Yang Zhi Yun
- Fiona Xie as Zhang Mei Ya
- Adam Chen as Xiao Fei

=== Supporting cast ===
- Bryan Wang as Chen Shu Tang
- Chen Shucheng as Zhang Ming Sheng
- Jin Yin Ji as Chen Yu Chun
- Hong Hui Fang as Liu Yu Han
- Ong Ai Leng as Ai Xi

== Synopsis ==
Li Shanqi, a betel nut seller, had to flee Taiwan after offending an underworld leader. With her late mother's belongings, she came to Singapore to look for her birth father who is a jewelry businessman. When she arrives, an unfortunate string of events took place before she finally reunites with him.

However, further trial and tribulations await Shanqi as her stepmother and stepsister make things difficult for her. Undaunted, Shanqi upgrades herself and excel as a jewelry designer. She even caught the eye of the man her stepsister, Meiya, fancies. As a proud Meiya turns mad with hatred and jealousy, will Shanqi's sweet turn of events be ruined by her? Will fate bring her and the man she loves together?

== Viewership ==
An average of 750,000 people watched this show every day during its telecast. On the last episode, a total of about 860,000 people watched the show. This drama series ranked 7th in terms of highest viewership ratings for the whole year.

== See also ==
- List of programmes broadcast by Mediacorp Channel 8
