= Love Story (2006 Singaporean film) =

2006 Hong Kong-Singaporean film

- Theatrical release poster
- Traditional Chinese: 愛情故事
- Simplified Chinese: 爱情故事
- Hanyu Pinyin: Àiqíng gùshì
- Directed by: Kelvin Tong
- Screenplay by: Kelvin Tong; Yeo Lay-leng
- Produced by: Leon Tong
- Starring: Allen Lin; Erica Lee; Evelyn Tan; Tracy Tan; Amanda Ling
- Cinematography: Chiu Wai-yin
- Edited by: Derek Ho
- Music by: Joe Ng; Alex Oh
- Production companies: Focus Films; Boku Films
- Distributed by: Golden Village Pictures
- Release dates: April 2006 (SGIFF); 25 May 2006 (Singapore)
- Running time: 96 minutes
- Countries: Hong Kong; Singapore
- Language: Mandarin
- Budget: US$500,000

Love Story (Chinese: 爱情故事) is a 2006 Hong Kong and Singaporean romantic drama film directed by Kelvin Tong. The film follows a romance novelist and his four different muses, and stars Allen Lin, Erica Lee, Evelyn Tan, Tracy Tan and Amanda Ling. Funded by Andy Lau's production company Focus Films as part of its Focus: First Cuts projects which was set up to encourage the region's promising directors, the film won Tong the Best Director award at the 2006 Singapore International Film Festival.

== Cast ==
- Allen Lin as Jiang Qin
- Erica Lee as PC 136
- Evelyn Tan as Librarian
- Tracy Tan as Theatre usher
- Amanda Ling as Punk rocker
- Benjamin Heng as The actor
- Ben Yeung

== Awards and nominations ==
Organisation	Year	Category	Recipient	Result	Ref.
Singapore International Film Festival	2006	Silver Screen Award for Best Director	Kelvin Tong	Won	
Locarno Film Festival	2006	Golden Leopard – Filmmakers of the Present	Kelvin Tong	Nominated	
