= Lunarin =

Alternative rock band

- Origin: Singapore
- Genres: Alternative rock, Alternative Metal, Progressive Rock, Progressive Metal
- Years active: 2003–present
- Label: Indie
- Members: (l-r); Loo Eng Teck; Linda Ong; Ho Kah Wye
- Website: lunarin.com

Lunarin is a 3-piece alternative rock band hailing from Singapore. Consisting of Linda Ong (Bass/Vocals), Ho Kah Wye (Guitars) and Loo Eng Teck (Drums/Vocals), the trio were friends since 1993. They started a 4-piece band called Fuzzbox in 1995 before exploring a darker progressive sound as Lunarin in 2003.

The band was highly prolific in the Singapore gig scene in the 2000s, playing numerous shows and gaining a reputation in the underground for their tight and intense live shows. The trio have been compared to heavy acts such as Tool (band), A Perfect Circle and Soundgarden while their softer sound has been attributed to Linda Ong’s deep affinity to female singer-songwriters such as Faye Wong, Tori Amos and P J Harvey.

The trio released their debut album “The Chrysalis” in 2006, their second full-length album “Duae” in 2010, and an acoustic album named “The Midas Sessions” in 2012.

Friends of the band know that the trio have always had difficulty focusing on music due to their day jobs and families – Loo and Ong are trained lawyers and Ho is an engineer by profession – and this proved true when the band went on hiatus in 2012 due to Ong’s pregnancy. This break extended when drummer Loo Eng Teck went on to have 2 children as well.

The band returned in 2018 with a new EP titled “Into the Ether”. Consisting of songs written during the 5 years when they were on hiatus and recorded when Ong was pregnant with her second child, “Into the Ether” was recorded by the band in Singapore, mixed by acclaimed music producer David Bottrill and mastered by Grammy winning mastering engineer Adam Ayan. The band collaborated with Singapore Clare Lee on this release, who created the accompanying artwork for the songs.

== Members ==
Lunarin consists of Ho Kah Wye (Guitars), Loo Eng Teck (Drums) and Linda Ong (Bass, Vocals). All 3 members of Lunarin were schoolmates in Dunman High School, Victoria Junior College and the National University of Singapore.

- Linda Ong : Lead Vocals, Electric Bass, Acoustic Bass
- Ho Kah Wye : Electric Guitar, Acoustic Guitar, Backing Vocals
- Loo Eng Teck : Drums, Percussion, Piano, Backing Vocals

== Music ==
Lunarin also contributed one song, a previously unreleased track called 'Absolution', to a CD compilation which was released by Aging Youth Records in support of Music For Good in April 2006.

== Discography ==
| Album / EP title | Cover art | Release date | Tracklisting |
|---|---|---|---|
| Limited Edition 2-Track Sampler (EP) | | 16 July 2005 | Ariel (Acoustic); Dry (Acoustic) |
| The Chrysalis | | 4 January 2006 | Eclipse; Dry; Ligeia; Shiver; Medusa; Ariel; Silverpiece; The Tower; Usher; The Chrysalis |
| Little Pieces (EP) | | 14 July 2006 | Absolution; Ligeia (Acoustic Live); Absolution (Director's Remix) |
| Duae | | 20 August 2010 | For Apollo; Midas; Zero Point Red; Saturn; Red; Coralline; Icarus Rising; Serpentine; To Forget; The Sky (Algiers); Solus Nebula; The Inquisition |
| The Midas Sessions | | 15 January 2012 | Ghost; Right of Sleep; Zero Point Red (Acoustic); 22; Midas (Acoustic); The Chrysalis (Acoustic); Coralline (Acoustic); Wednesday; Serpentine (Acoustic/Live)*; Isobel* |
