= Elizabeth Rice =

American actress (born 1985)

Elizabeth Ellen Rice
- Born: Elizabeth Ellen Rice; November 5, 1985 (age 40); Pine Bluff, Arkansas, U.S.
- Occupation: Actress
- Years active: 1990–present

Elizabeth Ellen Rice (born November 5, 1985) is an American actress, performing in television and film. Born and raised in Pine Bluff, Arkansas, she began her entertainment career at the age of five.

== Education, awards and nominations ==
She attended New York film academy and later graduated from North Carolina State University.

She won the Grand Jury Award in the 2008 Solstice Film Festival for Best Actress for From Within (2008).

== Filmography ==
=== Film ===
Year	Title	Role	Notes
1997	Sour Milk	Liz	Short film
2000	My Dog Skip	Rivers' Friend	
2008	From Within	Lindsay	
2012	Forgetting the Girl	Beth Dalewell	
2012	Dara Ju	Lydia	Short film
2012	Two Summers Ago	Jules	Short film
2014	Buttwhistle	Beth	
2014	The Last Rescue	2nd Lt. Nancy Bell	
2014	Garden of Eden	Catherine	Post-production
2016	The Faith of Anna Waters	Jamie Waters	

=== Television ===
Year	Title	Role	Notes
2001	Crossing Jordan	Sarah Browning	Episode: "Sight Unseen"
2002	ER	Sara Pasbalas	Episode: "One Can Only Hope"
2003	Peacemakers	Amy Owen	Episodes: "29 Seconds", "No Excuse", "Legend of the Gun"
2003	Without a Trace	Natasha Tzetcovich	Episode: "Prodigy"
2004	Boston Public	Marilee Morford	Episode: "Chapter 77"
2004	The Mystery of Natalie Wood	Teenage Natalie Wood	TV film
2005	Odd Girl Out	Nikki Rodriguez	TV film
2005	Close to Home	Tracy Fields	Episode: "Romeo and Juliet Murders"
2007-2014	Mad Men	Margaret Sterling Hargrove	Recurring role (10 episodes)
2009	CSI: Crime Scene Investigation	Jess Smith	Episode: "Death and the Maiden"
2010	Medium	Caroline Krueger	Episodes: "The Match Game", "How to Kill a Good Guy"
2013	Cult	Laura Spottswood	Episode: "Being Billy"
2017	Groomzilla	Allysa Rydell	TV film
