= Kelvin Tong =

Singaporean filmmaker (born 1971 or 1972)

- Born: 1971 or 1972 (age 52–53); Singapore
- Education: Victoria School; Victoria Junior College
- Alma mater: National University of Singapore
- Occupations: Film director; screenwriter; film producer; film critic
- Years active: 1996−present

Chinese name
- Traditional Chinese: 唐永健
- Simplified Chinese: 唐永健
- Hanyu Pinyin: Táng Yǒngjiàn

Kelvin Tong Weng Kian (born in 1971 or 1972) is a Singaporean film director, screenwriter and producer. He was a former film critic for The Straits Times.

== Career ==
Kelvin's passion for theatre and filmmaking began in his secondary school days in Victoria School. He went on to study at Victoria Junior College and law at the National University of Singapore. After a short nine-month stint with law firm, Drew & Napier, following his graduation from law school, Kelvin started out in the film business as a film critic, writing reviews for The Straits Times from 1995 to 1999. He made a short film, Moveable Feast, in 1996 with Sandi Tan and Jasmine Ng Kin Kia. His first feature, co-directed with Jasmine Ng Kin Kia, is "a motorcycle kung-fu love story", titled Eating Air, which was received respectably.

His next film, The Maid, a horror thriller, made a bigger impact, breaking the box office record in Singapore for the horror genre, making S$700,000 on its opening weekend. Hailed as the first Singaporean horror film, The Maid won the European Fantastic Film Festivals Federation Asian Film Award at the 10th Puchon International Fantastic Film Festival. It was produced by MediaCorp Raintree Pictures.

He next directed Love Story, which combined three short stories that examined different aspects of love. It was screened at the 2006 Pusan International Film Festival. The film was produced by Hong Kong–based Focus Films.

In 2007, he directed the horror-comedy Men in White, about four ghosts struggling to survive in Singapore, and which examined the Singaporean obsession with superstitions. It was produced by Innoform Media.

In 2008, he directed the crime thriller, Rule No. 1, produced by Hong Kong–based Fortune Star. He also plans to direct a film called Bed, a comedy drama set in 1960s Singapore when the city-state's education system switched from Chinese language to English.

Tong says his influences range "from Lars von Trier to Stephen Chow".

With his brother, producer Leon Tong, Kelvin has his own production company, Boku Films, enabling him to independently develop his film projects.

In a 2007 interview, Kelvin Tong said he is still learning his craft: "It is one thing to talk about films as a journalist, but it is fascinating that many of the decisions that make a difference between a good and a bad film are made in front of a monitor, often in a fraction of a second."

In June 2010, Tong was part of a group of Singapore filmmakers to protest the Asian Film Archive's head Tan Bee Thiam's supposed conflict of interest. Their letter led to Tan's resignation as executive director in September.

In 2014, Tong became the first Singaporean director to helm a Hollywood film when he started shooting The Faith of Anna Waters (2016), a horror film starring Elizabeth Rice, Matthew Settle and Adrian Pang. He also shot a short film as part of the 7 Letters omnibus to celebrate Singapore's 50th anniversary in 2015.

== Filmography ==
Year	Title	Notes
1996	Moveable Feast	Short film; co-director and writer
1999	Eating Air	Co-director and writer
2005	The Maid	
2006	Love Story	
2007	Men in White	
2008	Rule No. 1	
2010	Kidnapper	
2011	It's a Great, Great World	
2012	Dance Dance Dragon	Producer and writer
2015	7 Letters	Segment "Grandma Positioning System"
2016	The Faith of Anna Waters	
2018	Republic of Food	
2023	Trapped	Short film
2023	Confinement	
2023	A Year of No Significance	
