= Yvonne Lim =

Singaporean actress (born 1976)

- Born: 28 September 1976 (age 50); Singapore
- Other name: Lin Xiangping
- Education: Singapore Polytechnic
- Occupation: Actress
- Years active: 1997–present
- Spouse: Alex Tien (m. 2014)
- Children: 2
- Awards: Full list

Chinese name
- Traditional Chinese: 林湘萍
- Simplified Chinese: 林湘萍
- Hanyu Pinyin: Lín Xiāngpíng

Yvonne Lim (born 28 September 1976) is a Singaporean actress.

Best known for starring in many Chinese-language television dramas in Singapore, Taiwan and mainland China, Yvonne is one of the few actresses to have won both the Best Actress and the Best Supporting Actress awards at Singapore's Star Awards.

== Early life and education ==
Lim was born to Hokkien-speaking family. She studied at CHIJ St Theresa's Convent and graduated with a Diploma in Electronic, Computer, & Communication Engineering (DECC) at Singapore Polytechnic in 1996.

In an interview with SP's alumni magazine, she stated that she was a "shy girl" who rarely took part in extracurricular activities. At the recommendation of some friends, she took part in the Miss Singapore Polytechnic beauty pageant and finished first runner-up. She was a finalist with Go Magazine's Cover Girl Contest and did some modelling before joining Star Search Singapore 1997. While she was eliminated in the finals but she was offered a contract by the Television Corporation of Singapore.

== Career ==
Lim was given a lead role in Starting Point, where she played a young entrepreneur, and was well received by audiences. She was nominated for Best Newcomer and Top 10 Most Popular Female Artistes in the Star Awards 1998 after her debut, Starting Point. Although she did not manage to win the 'Best Newcomer 1998', she was voted into the Top 10 Most Popular Female Artistes for that year. However, her career started to pick up again in 1999 with her role of an unfortunate girl lost in the crowds of Singapore in the early 20th century in Stepping Out.

Her subsequent progress was fairly slow, mainly appearing in minor supporting roles (The Vagrant, A Child's Hope). Some attribute this trend to her petite build, which dwarf her in comparison to other actresses.

She also recorded and released a solo Mandarin album in 2000. In 2002, she participated in the Hong Kong television station ATV 30-part courtroom drama Innocently Guilty, which also starred Anita Yuen, Kent Cheng and Felix Wong.

In 2005, she landed major roles in popular dramas such as A New Life, where she played a poor but contented woman, and Portrait of Home, in which she played one of the antagonists. At the Star Awards 2005, she had the rare honour of being nominated in both acting categories and won the Best Supporting Actress for the latter. That drama's role as a vengeful woman was also named one of the top 10 most memorable villains at the Star Awards 2007 25th anniversary special.

In 2006, her stock rose even further when she landed the lead role in An Enchanted Life, a story of a Taiwanese betel nut seller who journeys to Singapore in search of her long-lost father. She also starred in the hit drama Metamorphosis in 2007, which granted her the coveted Star Awards 2007 Best Actress Award. This award was an important milestone for her as it led to her rising popularity. Metamorphosis also won Best TV Serial in the Star Awards 2007.

Lim appeared on numerous variety and game shows, including Let's Party With Food! and The Giant Show in 2008, after her win for Best Actress in the Star Awards 2007.

Lim has been nominated for Top 10 Most Popular Female Artistes in the Star Awards for every single year since she joined Mediacorp in 1998. After her first win in 1998, she did not win the Top 10 award until 2009.

== Personal life ==
Lim is married to former Taiwanese boy band B.A.D member Alex Tien, who is 3 years younger than her. The couple held their wedding on 7 September 2014, at Ritz Carlton Hotel, Singapore.

Lim gave birth to their first child, a son, on 27 December 2014 at Mount Elizabeth Hospital in Singapore, and after which they moved to Taiwan on 25 May 2015. On 6 January 2017, she gave birth to her second child, a daughter, in Taiwan. As of 2018, their daughter acquired her Singapore citizenship.

In 2019, Lim planned to move her family back to Singapore. In November 2024, she announced she is moving back to Singapore in 2025.

== Filmography ==
=== Film ===
Year	Title	Role	Notes	Ref.
2002	Nothing to Lose	Daderufang		
2007	Truth Be Told	Renee Donovan / Ling Ling		
2011	It's A Great, Great World	Tan Ah Huay		
2012	My Dog Dou Dou	Xing's Mother		
2013	Popiah	Youngest Auntie		
2019	When Ghost Meets Zombie	Judge		

=== Television series ===
Year	Title	Role	Notes	Ref.
1997	Starting Point	He Xinjie		
1997	Danger in Sight			
1998	The Return of the Condor Heroes	Guo Xiang		
1998	The New Adventures of Wisely	Huang Honghong		
1998	Legend of the Eight Immortals	Long San		
1999	Stepping Out	Hai Yan		
1999	Hero of the Times	Lei Xiaoti		
2000	The Voices Within			
2000	Master Swordsman Lu Xiaofeng 2	Ye Xue		
2000	Don't Worry, Be Happy V			
2001	The Hotel			
2001	The Reunion	Lu Xiuwen		
2001	The Vagrant	Song Xintian		
2002	Innocently Guilty			
2003	True Heroes	Irene		
2003	A Child's Hope	Fang Xiuyue		
2004	Amnesia (telemovie)			
2004	The Dragon Heroes	Princess Yin Qiao		
2004	My Fair Lady	Huai Xiao		
2004	Celestial Legends			
2004	烟花三月		Chinese production	
2004	Stranger in the mirror			
2005	Portrait of Home	Chen Fenling (Fyn)		
2005	Portrait of Home II	Chen Fenling (Fyn)		
2005	Beautiful Illusions	Lu Xiaofen		
2005	A New Life	Ah Mei		
2006	Fairy of the Chalice			
2006	An Enchanted Life	Li Shanqi		
2007	A Mobile Love Story	Su Fei		
2007	Metamorphosis	Sheryl Wen Wanrou		
2008	Nanny Daddy	Lin Aihua		
2008	Love Blossoms II	Pan Jiaqi		
2008	Perfect Cut	Herself		
2009	Your Hand in Mine	Zheng Aizhen		
2010	Secret Garden			
2011	Kampong Ties	Lin Shuixian		
2011	The Oath	Xu Yunwen		
2012	Rescue 995	Xu Wenqian		
2013	Marry Me	Liu Xixi		
2013	Break Free	Tian Shishi		
2014	World at Your Feet	Zheng Yongyi		
2014	Blessings	Du Shini		
2015	The Female Assassins in the Palace	Da Na	Chinese production	
2019	A World of Difference	Li Jiaying		
2019	While You Were Away	Wu Senmei		
2023	Strike Gold	Lisa Fang		
2023	Whatever Will Be, Will Be	Liu Bizhen	Dialect series	
2026	The Grind	Ye Kui		
2026	Timeless Memories	Qian Limin		

== Discography ==
=== Compilation albums ===
Year	English title	Mandarin title
2009	MediaCorp Music Lunar New Year Album 09	新传媒福牛迎端年
2010	MediaCorp Music Lunar New Year Album 10	新传媒金虎迎富贵

== Awards and nominations ==
Year	Organisation	Category	Nominated work	Result	Ref
1998	Star Awards	Best Newcomer	Starting Point (as He Xinjie)	Nominated	
1998	Star Awards	Best Supporting Actress	Condor Heroes (as Guo Xiang)	Nominated	
1998	Star Awards	Top 10 Most Popular Female Artistes	—N/a	Won	
1999	Star Awards	Best Supporting Actress	Stepping Out (as Hai Yan)	Nominated	
1999	Star Awards	Top 10 Most Popular Female Artistes	—N/a	Nominated	
2000	Star Awards	Top 10 Most Popular Female Artistes	—N/a	Nominated	
2001	Star Awards	Best Supporting Actress	Master Swordsman Lu Xiaofeng 2 (as Ye Xue)	Nominated	
2001	Star Awards	Top 10 Most Popular Female Artistes	—N/a	Nominated	
2002	Star Awards	Top 10 Most Popular Female Artistes	—N/a	Nominated	
2003	Star Awards	Top 10 Most Popular Female Artistes	—N/a	Nominated	
2004	Star Awards	Top 10 Most Popular Female Artistes	—N/a	Nominated	
2005	Star Awards	Best Supporting Actress	Portrait of Home (as Fyn)	Won	
2005	Star Awards	Top 10 Most Popular Female Artistes	—N/a	Nominated	
2005	Star Awards	Best Actress	A New Life (as Ah Mei)	Nominated	
2006	Asian Television Awards	Best Actress in a Leading Role	Portrait Of Home II (as Fyn)	Highly Commended	
2006	Star Awards	Top 10 Most Popular Female Artistes	—N/a	Nominated	
2007	Star Awards	Top 10 Most Popular Female Artistes	—N/a	Nominated	
2007	Star Awards	Best Actress	Metamorphosis (as Wen Wanrou)	Won	
2007	Star Awards	Top 10 Most Memorable Villains	Portrait of Home (as Fyn)	Won	
2009	Asian Television Awards	Best Actress in a Leading Role	Perfect Cut	Nominated	
2009	Star Awards	Top 10 Most Popular Female Artistes	—N/a	Won	
2010	Star Awards	Top 10 Most Popular Female Artistes	—N/a	Won	
2011	Star Awards	Top 10 Most Popular Female Artistes	—N/a	Won	
2012	Star Awards	Top 10 Most Popular Female Artistes	—N/a	Won	
2012	Star Awards	Best Supporting Actress	The Oath (as Yunwen)	Nominated	
2013	Star Awards	Top 10 Most Popular Female Artistes	—N/a	Won	
2014	Star Awards	Top 10 Most Popular Female Artistes	—N/a	Won	
2014	Star Awards	Most Popular Regional Artiste (China)	—N/a	Won	
2014	Star Awards	Most Popular Regional Artiste (Indonesia)	—N/a	Nominated	
2014	Star Awards	Most Popular Regional Artiste (Cambodia)	—N/a	Nominated	
2015	Star Awards	Best Actress	World at Your Feet (as Zheng Yongyi)	Nominated	
2015	Star Awards	Most Popular Regional Artiste (China)	—N/a	Nominated	
2015	Star Awards	Most Popular Regional Artiste (Indonesia)	—N/a	Nominated	
2015	Star Awards	Most Popular Regional Artiste (Cambodia)	—N/a	Nominated	
2021	Star Awards	Top 10 Most Popular Female Artistes	—N/a	Won	
2022	Star Awards	Top 10 Most Popular Female Artistes	—N/a	Won	
2024	Star Awards	Top 10 Most Popular Female Artistes	—N/a	Won	
2025	Star Awards	All-Time Favourite Artiste	—N/a	Won	
