= Benjamin Heng =

Singaporean actor

- Born: Singapore
- Other name: Wang Zhiguo
- Education: Singapore Polytechnic
- Occupation: Actor
- Years active: 1999−present
- Spouse: Michelle Ng (died 2019)
- Children: 1

Chinese name
- Traditional Chinese: 王智國
- Simplified Chinese: 王智国
- Hanyu Pinyin: Wáng Zhìguó

Benjamin Heng is a Singaporean actor, known for starring in the romantic action film Eating Air, the comedy film Lelio Popo, and in the horror comedy film Zombiepura, as well as in several television series, such as Anything Goes, Durian King and Money No Problem!.

== Early life and education ==
Heng was a student of maritime transportation at Singapore Polytechnic.

== Career ==
Prior to acting, Heng had worked as a waiter, a Mexican cook, a stagehand and in a watch factory. Heng made his acting debut by starring in Kelvin Tong and Jasmine Ng's romantic action film Eating Air in 1999. He starred in the television series The Frontline in 2003. In 2004, he signed up with SPH MediaWorks after leaving Fly Entertainment. By then, he had appeared in the television series Brand New Towkay. He also starred in the television series Durian King and Money No Problem!, which were filmed in July. Later that year, he starred in the medical drama Heal And Be Healed. He appeared in the 2006 romance film Love Story. In 2006, he used his retrenchment package from SPH MediaWorks and borrowed money from family members in order to open the Flowerbed Kitchen & Bar noodle eatery. The eatery's chef was former actress Deborah Sim whom he met on the set of Heal And Be Healed. It closed in 2007, resulting in a "six-figure loss". He starred in the 2007 horror comedy film Men in White.

Heng rejoined Fly Entertainment under a three-year contract in 2008. He starred in the comedy series Calefare. He starred in the 2010 comedy film Lelio Popo. He played a supporting role in the 2011 horror film Twisted. Later that year, he appeared in the sitcom Anything Goes, as well as the television series Days When We Are Young. He also played a supporting role in the 2012 comedy film Dance Dance Dragon. He appeared in the television series The Recruit Diaries. He appeared in the television series The Dream Job in 2016. He was featured in the special four-episode series On The Red Dot — In My Helper's Shoes. He starred in the 2018 horror comedy film Zombiepura, which he co-produced. He appeared in the 2019 romantic comedy film When Ghost Meets Zombie. Later that year, he starred in the 2019 TV miniseries I'm Madam!.

== Personal life ==
Heng was married to Michelle Ng, a former marketing manager, with whom he had one daughter. Ng died on 15 June 2019.

== Filmography ==
=== Film ===
Year	Title	Role	Notes	Ref.
1999	Eating Air	Ah Boy		
2006	Love Story	The actor		
2007	Men in White			
2010	Lelio Popo			
2011	Twisted			
2012	Dance Dance Dragon			
2014	Filial Party	Director		
2018	Zombiepura	Lee Siao On		
2019	When Ghost Meets Zombie	Joe		

=== Television ===
Year	Title	Role	Notes	Ref.
2001	Brand New Towkay			
2003	The Frontline			
2004	Durian King			
2004	Heal And Be Healed			
2004	Money No Problem!			
2005	Tiramisu	Marcus		
2007	Parental Guidance	Matthew Seto		
2008	Calefare	Hamsome		
2008	Taste of Love			
2009	Goodbye Kucinta			
2010	Secret Garden			
2011	Days When We Are Young			
2011	Dragon’s Inn	Assassin		
2011	Fatherhood			
2011	Feast Fight			
2011	Point of Entry			
2011	We Are Singaporeans		Game show	
2011	You're History			
2012	The Diary of Amos Lee			
2013	C.L.I.F. 2	Tang Yewcheng		
2013	Journey With Me			
2013	The Recruit Diaries			
2014	Koji Cooks	Koji Tan		
2014	Mata Mata			
2014	Working Class	Nick Ong / Wee Kiat		
2015	118	Max Chan		
2015	On The Red Dot — In My Helper's Shoes			
2015	You Can Be an Angel Too	Liu Yongming		
2016	The Dream Job	Peter		
2017	Faculty			
2017	Meet the MP	Lester Bee		
2018	Mind Matters	Fang Zhengye		
2019	I'm Madam!			
2020	Classmates	Andy	TV mini series	
2020	Maisonette	Adrian	TV mini series	
2022	Third Rail	Choy Boonwee		
