= City Beat =

New Zealand television series

City Beat is a reality television series from New Zealand, following late night patrols by security guards on the streets of Auckland. The program features employees of First Security, working as part of an initiative to reduce the workload of the city police force, dealing with street crime such as drunken disorder, street fighting, break ins, road rage and car crashes.

The series was originally aired on the free to air TV 2 network in New Zealand during 2002/2003, but was later syndicated across the globe on networks such as Zone Reality (UK).

== Featured guards ==
The show often featured on a number of guards who would be introduced in the opening titles of each show.

Senior Guards Bill, Mark, T, John and Jason are featured on every episode, commonly joined by other guards including James, Davy Grover, Stuart and Scott.
