= Sandi Tan =

American film director

- Born: 1972 (age 53–54); Singapore
- Education: University of Kent; Columbia University (MFA)
- Occupation: Filmmaker
- Years active: 1992–present

Sandi Tan
- Traditional Chinese: 陳善治
- Simplified Chinese: 陈善治
Transcriptions
Standard Mandarin
- Hanyu Pinyin: Chén Shànzhì
Southern Min
- Hokkien POJ: Tân Siān-tǐ

Sandi Tan (born 1972 in Singapore) is a film critic, writer, and filmmaker. After attending the University of Kent, she wrote as the film critic for The Straits Times from 1995 to 1997 before attending Columbia University's film school and earning a Master of Fine Arts in Screenwriting. Her first short film, Moveable Feast, was her entry in the 1996 Singapore International Film Festival.

Tan has worked as the director for short films Moveable Feast (1996) and Gourmet Baby (2001), but is best known for her full-length 2018 documentary, Shirkers. Shirkers made its debut at the 2018 Sundance Film Festival, at which it won the Directing Award: World Cinema Documentary. Her debut novel, The Black Isle, was published by Grand Central Publishing in 2012 and was generally well received by critics and readers.

Tan's novel Lurkers was released on March 30, 2021 by Soho Press. She will be directing a film adaptation of Elif Batuman's novel The Idiot.

== Filmography ==
Year	Film	Writer	Director	Producer	Notes
2018	Shirkers	✓	✓	✓	Documentary
2001	Gourmet Baby	✓	✓	✓	Short film
1998	Stop & Go	✗	✓	✗	TV series
1996	Moveable Feast	✗	✓	✗	Documentary
