= Michael Younesi =

American film director

- Born: 3 February 1987 (age 39); Los Angeles, California, U.S.
- Occupations: Filmmaker, director, producer
- Years active: 2006–present

Michael Younesi (born February 3, 1987) is an American-Iranian filmmaker, whose directing and producing work includes television, films and advertisements. He is perhaps best known as director and executive producer of the Emmy-nominated Netflix series Project Mc2. He also directed the short film Liberation. He is a graduate of the USC School of Cinematic Arts. In December 2019, Younesi wrote and directed the original movie, Adventure Force 5 for Vudu and Studio71.

== Filmography ==
Year	Title	Director	Screenwriter	Producer	Notes
2008	Fosh The Movie	Yes	Yes	Yes	Persian Language
2009	Liberation	Yes	Yes	Yes	
2009	The Copper Barron	Yes	Yes	Yes	
2010	Look Not At The Mountains	Yes	Yes	Yes	
2014	Black Martini	No	Yes	Yes	
2015	Project MC2	Yes	Yes	Yes	Director (7 Episodes), Producer (10 Episodes)
2019	Adventure Force 5	Yes	Yes	Yes	
2024	FOSH 2	Yes	Yes	Yes	July 10 2024 Release. Persian Language
