= Don't Forget the Lyrics! (Singaporean game show) =

- 我要唱下去！
- Presented by: Gurmit Singh (English); Adrian Pang (English, Only for Comic Mayhem Episode); Sam Tseng (Chinese); Mark Lee (Chinese All Stars Edition)
- Country of origin: Singapore
- No. of episodes: 42

Production
- Running time: 60 minutes (with commercials)

Original release
- Network: MediaCorp Channel 5 (English); MediaCorp Channel 8 (Chinese/Chinese All-Stars)
- Release: 27 November 2008 – 24 August 2010

Don't Forget the Lyrics! is the Singaporean version of the international game show Don't Forget the Lyrics!. In Singapore, an English-language version premiered on 27 November 2008, whereas the Chinese Mandarin-language version premiered on 25 August 2009 in addition to a special celebrity episodes in 2010.

== Gameplay ==
A contestant is presented with nine categories representing different genres, time periods, artists, or themes. Each category contains two songs to choose from. In each round, the contestant selects a category and song, and then begins a karaoke performance to a portion of the selected song as the lyrics are displayed on a screen. Eventually, the music stops and the screen displays a group of blanks, representing words that the contestant must attempt to supply.

Like in the original American version, the contestant may review, amend, and lock in their guess, or use one of their "backups" to assist them in figuring out the correct lyric:

- Backup Singer (二人帮): The contestant can bring a supporter (e.g. friend or family member) on-stage to perform the song again or otherwise provide their own guess for consideration. The contestant is given a choice of sticking with their own lyrics or going with the backup singer's lyrics if it is different.
- Two Words (一送一): The contestant may have any two words of their choice correctly filled in.
- Three Lines (三提示): Gives the contestant a choice of three possible answers, of which one is the correct line (the lyric that are common on all three lines are colored green automatically).

Contestants progress up a money ladder for each correct answer given, ranging from $1,000 to $200,000 ($100 to $20,000 on the Chinese celebrity). As long as the contestant has not locked in lyrics for the current song, they may choose to walk away with their winnings so far. If the contestant locks in with an incorrect answer, the game ends and they lose any winnings they have accrued. If the contestant makes it past the fourth song, they are guaranteed to leave with no less than $10,000 (or $1,000 in the Chinese celebrity).

If the contestant makes it past all nine categories, they become eligible to play the final "Half-a-Million Song", ("$500,000 song" for the Chinese version, or "$50,000 song" for the Chinese celebrity version), but is not revealed to the contestant in advance. The contestant may either end the game with their winnings up to that point, or risk it for a chance at the top prize. Unlike the other rounds, the contestant is only allowed to use the Backup Singer, and cannot freely walk away: if they answer incorrectly or walk away, their winnings are reduced to the guaranteed amount, a format which would later be adopted in the 2022 revival of the American version.

=== Money ladder ===
As contestants sing correct lyrics, contestants move up the progressive money ladder and their winnings increases; upon reaching a certain point in the game, their money is guaranteed and contestants keep their amount if they got any lyrics wrong, which indicated in bold.

Correct song lines	Prize value	
Correct song lines	Normal version	Chinese celebrity
1	$1,000	$100
2	$2,000	$200
3	$5,000	$500
**4**	**$10,000** (Guaranteed sum)	**$1,000** (Guaranteed sum)
5	$15,000	$1,500
6	$25,000	$2,500
7	$50,000	$5,000
8	$100,000	$10,000
9	$200,000	$20,000
**10**	**$500,000** (Grand Prize)	**$50,000** (Grand Prize)

== English and Chinese Versions ==
=== English Version ===
The Singapore version of the game show, hosted by Singapore Idol host Gurmit Singh, premiered on 27 November 2008 and ran till 9 April 2009 on MediaCorp Channel 5. It airs every Thursday night at 8:00pm. Contestants will sing their way to the top prize of S$500,000.

Similar to the American version, three backups were available during the game; each backup can only be used once throughout the game on any level but the final song. They were Backup Singer (二人帮), Two Words (一送一) and Three Lines (三提示).

Unlike the American version, contestants/teams who chose to attempt the final song (dubbed "Half-a-Million Song", or "$500,000 song" for the Chinese version) does not immediate raise the guaranteed cash value of $10,000 (in the American version, contestants/teams attempting the final song did raised the guaranteed cash from $25,000 to $100,000, which was the value for the sixth level), meaning the contestant would drop down to the $10,000 mark with an incorrect answer to the final song. This was first seen on the Chinese Version (see below).

The first episode on November 27, 2008 featured Singapore Idol contestants Hady Mirza, Jonathan Leong and Taufik Batisah for a Pop Stars Edition of the show. They earned a total of S$25,000 for charity.

During the Comic Mayhem episode in the Singapore version aired on March 5, 2009, the episode was mashup with another game show, Deal or No Deal, where the host Adrian Pang hosted the episode, and the show ended with the three contestants running away due to the time, and ended with the lyrics of the $10,000 song "Macrena", which the team did not lock in. The contestants for the first part of the Comic Mayhem Special were Phua Chu Kang (Gurmit Singh) from Phua Chu Kang Pte Ltd, Barberella (Michelle Chong) from The Noose and Sgt Dollah Abu Bakar (Suhaimi Yusof) from Police & Thief. The second episode on March 12, 2009, returned to normal where Gurmit Singh returned as host, where Adrianna Wow (Michelle Chong), Jojo Joget (Suhaimi Yusof) (both from The Noose) and Adrian Pang were the contestants. In the end, the team won S$50,000, which was given to charity.

Another special episode featured local Channel 5 babes in the form of Fiona Xie, Jade Seah and Andrea Fonseka. On the S$50,000 to S$100,000 mark, Andrea was confident of her answer to the song of "The Boy is Mine" with 12 missing words. The trio locked the lyrics, but was incorrect (only one word, "what's", was wrong, where the actual lyrics was "When will you get the picture, You're the past, I'm the future"), and as a result they were left with S$10,000 which was raised for charity.

On the final episode on April 9, 2009, MPs Maliki Osman and Baey Yam Keng participated in the game show, and raised S$25,000 for charity.

=== Chinese Version ===
The Chinese Version (Chinese: 我要唱下去) premiered on 25 August 2009 at 8:00pm every Tuesday. It is hosted by Taiwanese host Sam Tseng. Like the English version, the Mandarin version had 14 episodes, with 10 civilian episodes and four celebrity episodes. Unlike the English version, the host would not provide how many missing lyrics in advance, similar to the Taiwanese version known as 百万大歌星.

On the two episodes aired October 7 and 14, 2009, Wu Huixin (Chinese: 吴惠欣) become the first contestant in any version of the show to win $200,000, but opted not to risk $190,000 to attempt the $500,000 song. With that, Wu become the highest-winning female Singaporean game show contestant to date, and the second overall after Steven Tan, who won $250,000 on a December 27, 2001 episode of Who Wants to be a Millionaire.

There were four celebrity episodes airing on the first, fifth, tenth and the final episodes. The first celebrity team consisting of three local comedians, Mark Lee, Michelle Tay and Henry Thia won S$10,000 for the charity; the second team featuring local Singaporean singers Joi Chua, Kelvin Tan and Chew Sin Huey raising S$10,000 for their charity; a third team featuring local television hosts Jeff Wang, Kym Ng and Quan Yi Fong winning S$25,000, and the last team, YES 933 DJs Dennis Chew, Seah Kar Huat and Siau Jia Hui, raised the largest for the celebrities in the series, with S$50,000. In total, S$95,000 were raised from the four teams.

=== Chinese Version (All Stars Edition) ===
A third installment of Singaporean's Don't Forget the Lyrics (titled Chinese: 我要唱下去 名人版), started filming their 14 episodes from 7 to 12 May and 1 and 2 June 2010. Tseng was replaced by Mark Lee as the host. The series ran for 14 episodes from 1 June to 24 August. The money ladder was reduced by tenfold (see money ladder above). In each episode except for one, teams of three members with a common theme compete to raise for their charity.

At the end of the series, a grand total of $50,000 was raised to the three charities (Singapore Children's Society, Lee Ah Mooi Old Age Home and Bishan Home for the Intellectually Disabled). The highest amount raised in the charity version was $10,000 by a singing expert team consist of Anthony Png, Dawn Yip and Cao Jian Ping. Two teams made it to the final level (Taiwanese Singers Tony Sun, Ehlo Huang and Yang Guang; and Project Superstar season two contestants Kelvin Soon, Lydia Tan and Carrie Yeo); however, both teams took the risk to reveal the final song title, but immediately walked away before singing, and left with $1,000 for their charities.
