= Jonathan Leong =

Jonathan Leong, 梁偉鑛
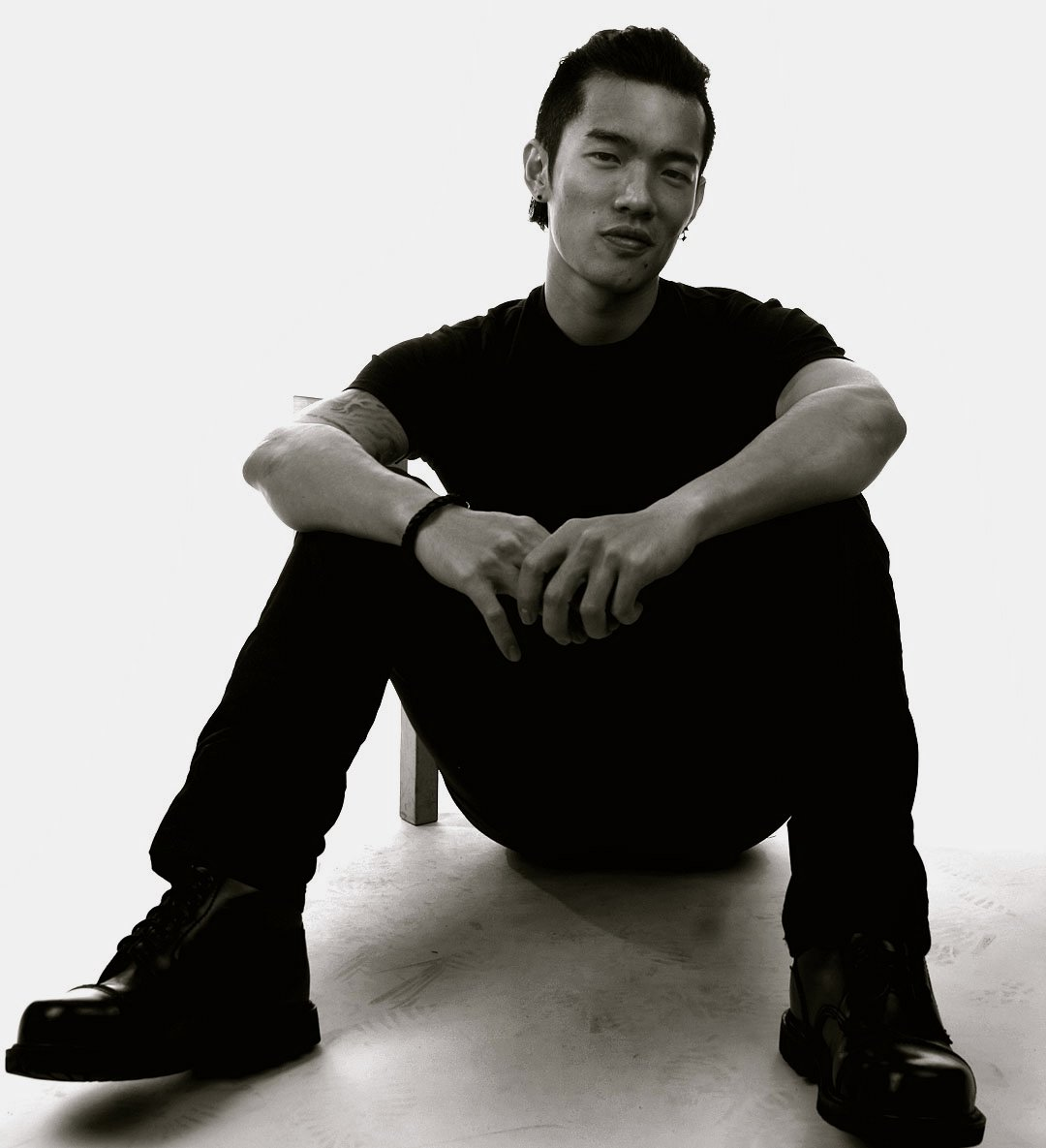
- Jonathan Leong

Background information
- Also known as: Jon Leong
- Born: Jonathan Ken Leong, 梁偉鑛; 6 June 1982 (age 44)
- Origin: Singapore
- Genres: Rock, Pop, Alternative rock, Jazz, Swing
- Occupations: Singer, songwriter, actor
- Instruments: Vocals, guitar, piano
- Years active: 2003–present
- Label: Hype Records
- Website: http://jonleong.com

Jon Leong, 梁偉鑛, (pronounced Liang Wei Kuang in mandarin) (Born Jonathan Leong, 6 June 1982) is a Singaporean performing artist, singer-songwriter, music producer and actor. His first steps into the world of entertainment started when he played in bands in the Singaporean live music bar and club scene through his university days before achieving public prominence after finishing as the runner-up during the second season of Singapore Idol, a franchise of the popular Pop Idol series. He played the principal role of "The Boy" in the Cirque Du Soleil-esque circus musical, Voyage De La Vie. The show ran for more than 3 years, making it the longest running show in Singapore until the time of its closing.

Leong also recorded a full-length studio album, which was released on 22 September 2011. He left his record label soon after.

Since 2013, Leong moved into banking and finance and into the Investment management industry.

== Early life ==
Leong was born and raised in Singapore, he is a son of Joseph, an owner of a newspaper stand, and Mary, an ex airline ticket sales executive. Leong was raised catholic and received his primary school education at Nan Hua Primary School, secondary school education at St. Joseph's Institution where he won his first singing competition in 1997 and junior college education in Serangoon Junior College. Leong finished his academic life graduating in 2007 from the National University of Singapore with a degree in Political Science. Leong was active in sports during his school days, notably so in fencing. He had earned himself the school colors from both his secondary school and junior college for his contribution to the respective schools through the sport. Leong had won many national fencing competitions and was part of the Singapore national team, representing the country in the sport from the year 2000–2001.

Trained electric organ and classical piano from an early age, Leong developed a deep love with music. Leong often cites his father and his family as very strong musical influences in many interviews, saying that his father's one time stint as a singer for a band and the many musical jam sessions that surrounded the young singer-to be weaned him for his career in entertainment. Leong cited his early influences to be a lot of old mainstream pop music, classic rock, heavy metal and hard rock. In many interviews, he has mentioned the vocal stylings of Rob Thomas, Elvis Presley, Dave Gahan, David Bowie, Scott Weiland, Frank Sinatra, Dean Martin and Bono as strong influences.

His first memorable experience on the stage was when he won a school singing contest at the age of 15 and got the opportunity to give a solo performance at a school event as a result. In an interview with Channel NewsAsia, he mentioned that he took part in the singing contest "to get out of detention, not to win and fate decided the rest."

Towards the end of his military term, he formed the rock band, Reverie, taking the role of lead singer with other members of his unit. Leong fronted rock band, Reverie, in the pub and club scene for four years as a means of income while attending university. The band was reasonably successful and they were often hired to play private events, the most notable being FHM Singapore's Girl next door competition finals and various university parties alongside other bands. The band also recorded an original song for a World Harmony Day event for the Nanyang Academy of Fine Arts.

In late 2004, Leong was signed on to Upfront Models a very well known, modeling agency in Singapore. His involvement in the fashion industry led him to branch out as a solo singer with performances at various fashion events such as DKNY's store launch at Palais renaissance, an upmarket shopping arcade in Singapore, The Takashimaya Singapore Retailer's show, The New Paper New Face pageant finals and as a guest performer at the Concert in the park held at the Singapore Botanic Gardens in 2005.

== Singapore Idol ==
Auditioning for the popular reality series among thousands and eventually reaching the finals held at the Singapore indoor Stadium of the television show with eventual winner, Hady Mirza, is Leong's first foray into mainstream media attention.

In the early part of the competition, Leong sang Matchbox Twenty's "If You're Gone" to cinch his place in the top 12 and was an early media and crowd favourite after that performance. During jazz week, his rendition of Nat King Cole's "Unforgettable" cemented his position as a hot favourite in the competition. However, the performance that won the hearts of the Singaporean population was his take on Irish indie rock band Snow Patrol's hit song, "Chasing Cars", which placed Leong as the media's favourite for the title. Leong finished the competition as 1st runner up in the finals held in the Singapore Indoor Stadium where he performed to a full crowd of more than 12,000 people.

The nationally televised singing competition put Leong's distinctive baritone voice on the map and made him one of the most recognizable faces and voices in the Singaporean entertainment scene. It did not come as a surprise when Leong was offered a record deal (from chief Singapore Idol judge, Ken Lim) a year later, the chief judge was remembered to have said on air (after the announcement of the final results) that Leong had what it took to "be a regional star, anytime."

During the competition he garnered a huge fanbase, self named the 'Jonatics'. Leong has mentioned on some occasions that he was initially uncomfortable with the word, "fan" and prefers to refer to his fanbase as "supporters" as he felt that the "fan" sounded "rather snooty". His fanbase has been well aware of Leong's longtime affinity with animals and have adopted a dog and a monkey in his name at a dog society in the case of the former and the Night Safari for the latter.

== Post-Idol career ==
Following Singapore Idol, Leong has performed at many high-profile events, television shows and many concert venues including Miss Singapore Universe, the President's Star Charity Singapore, a Levi's jeans launch and an FHM event.

In December 2006, Leong hosted a local holiday special series produced by Mediacorp named "Wish Upon A Star" alongside Hady Mirza and Gurmit Singh to fulfill contractual obligations. It was filmed between November and December 2006. He was voted Man of the Year 2006 in The Flame Awards organised by The New Paper. Mediacorp's Channel 5 Fame Awards gave Leong the title of "Best Hunk 2006".

In 2007, Leong was made an ambassador for the Motorola Singapore (RED) Campaign, an initiative spearheaded by Bono of U2 to alleviate the spread of HIV in Africa. In November that year, Leong lent his vocals to a Mandarin track, 情牵二十五, which was included in the track list for an album compilation to commemorate Mediacorp's twenty five-year anniversary of broadcasting locally produced mandarin drama serials on Channel 8.

In September 2008, Leong acted in an episode in Calefare, as a popular singer named Johnny Chia, a parody of himself. When interviewed if he was aware of the similarities between the two shows, Leong expressed ignorance during filming, but has since "immensely enjoyed" the original British sitcom after the fact. He was featured as a celebrity guest contestant in the premiere episode of the Singaporean version of the popular television gameshow Don't Forget the Lyrics!. Along with other singers, Leong managed to raise $25,000 for charity. He was also an ambassador for the Passion Card Ad campaign for the People's Association.

== Theatrical Circus career ==
In April 2010, it was announced that Leong would star in the original theatrical production, "Voyage De La Vie" along with a cast of international performers. After several rounds of auditions, Leong got the lead role of "The Boy".

Leong is the only Singaporean performer in "Voyage De La Vie", a Cirque Du Soleil-esque show with circus performances, elaborate sets, costumes and original music.

== Solo album ==
On 22 September 2011, Leong's solo album, 神秘英雄 (Mysterious Hero) was released. The album is recorded in Mandarin but featured one English single titled, For You. The single 多一次机会 peaked at number 7 on the Top 20 Countdown chart on the most popular radio station in Singapore, Y.E.S. 93.3FM.

== Internet blog and Podcast Show ==
In August 2011, Leong started a web blog named "Life in Stereo- Jonathan Leong's guide to Life" and an accompanying monthly podcast show that is available for free download on his website.

== Personal life ==
In many of his interviews, Leong has emphasized his priority away from work is always his family, loved one, his pets and close friends. Leong has always shown a great love and respect for films and good writing. He has mentioned on several occasion that enjoys writing, reading and art.

Leong married Jeneen Goh on 26 December 2015.
