= Singapore Indoor Stadium =

Sports arena and performance venue in Singapore

- 新加坡室内体育馆; Stadium Tertutup Singapura சிங்கப்பூர் மூடப்பட்ட அரங்கம்
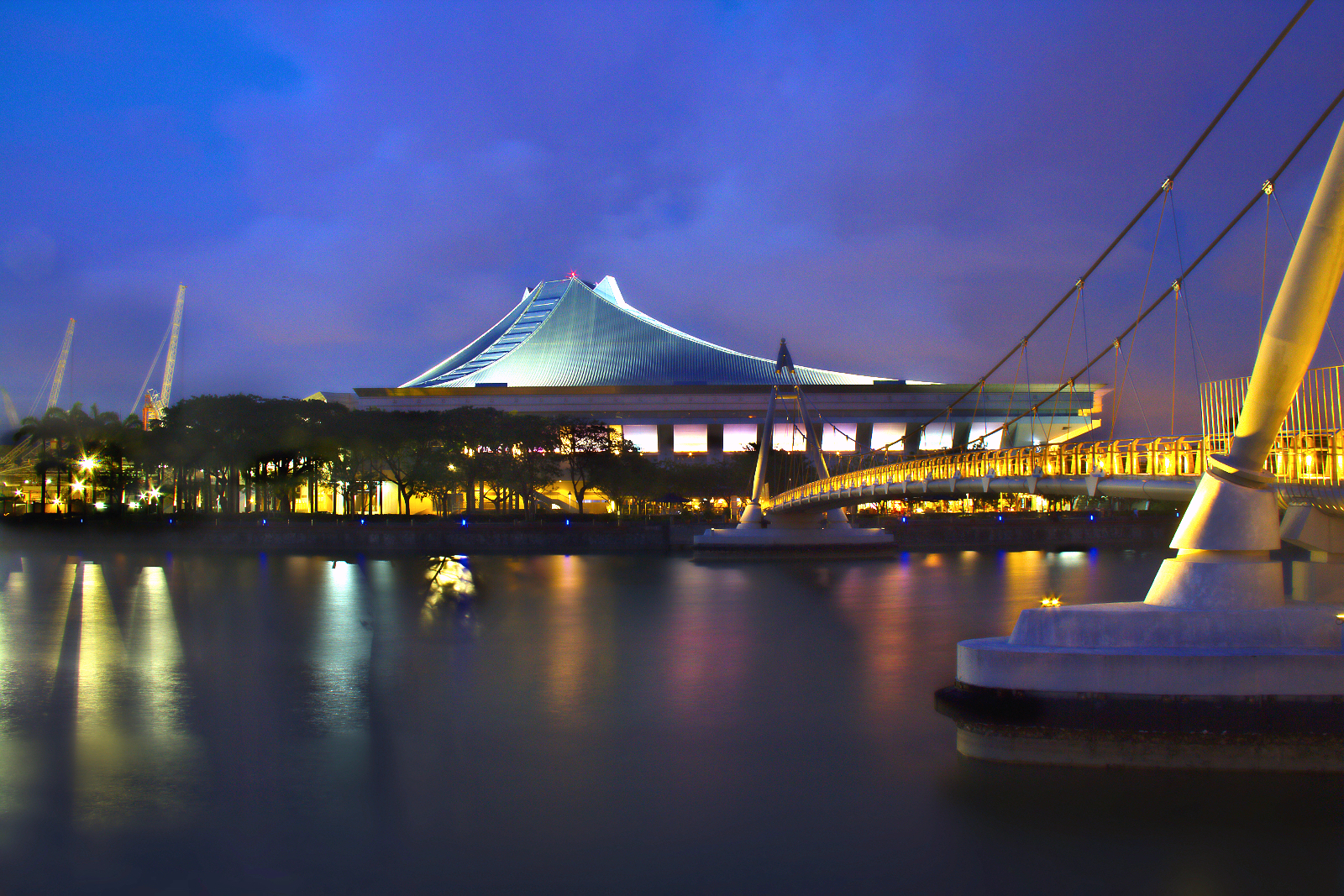
- Exterior view
- Interactive map of Singapore Indoor Stadium
- Location: 2 Stadium Walk, Singapore 397691
- Coordinates: 1°18′02″N 103°52′28″E
- Owner: Government of Singapore
- Operator: Sport Singapore
- Capacity: Concerts: 8,000–9,000; Sporting events: 12,000; Maximum: 15,000
- Public transit: CC6 Stadium; EW10 Kallang; TE23 Tanjong Rhu

Construction
- Groundbreaking: 1 January 1985; 41 years ago
- Built: 1 March 1987; 39 years ago
- Opened: 31 December 1989; 36 years ago
- Cost: S$90 million
- Architect: Kenzo Tange

Tenants
- Sport Singapore; Singapore Slingers; Singapore Slammers (IPTL, 2014–2016); Singapore Open

The Singapore Indoor Stadium, known exonymously as the Indoor Stadium, is an indoor arena located in Kallang, Singapore. It is within walking distance of the Singapore National Stadium, and collectively form a part of The Kallang. It has a maximum total capacity of 15,000 depending on configuration, with an all-seating configuration of 12,000.

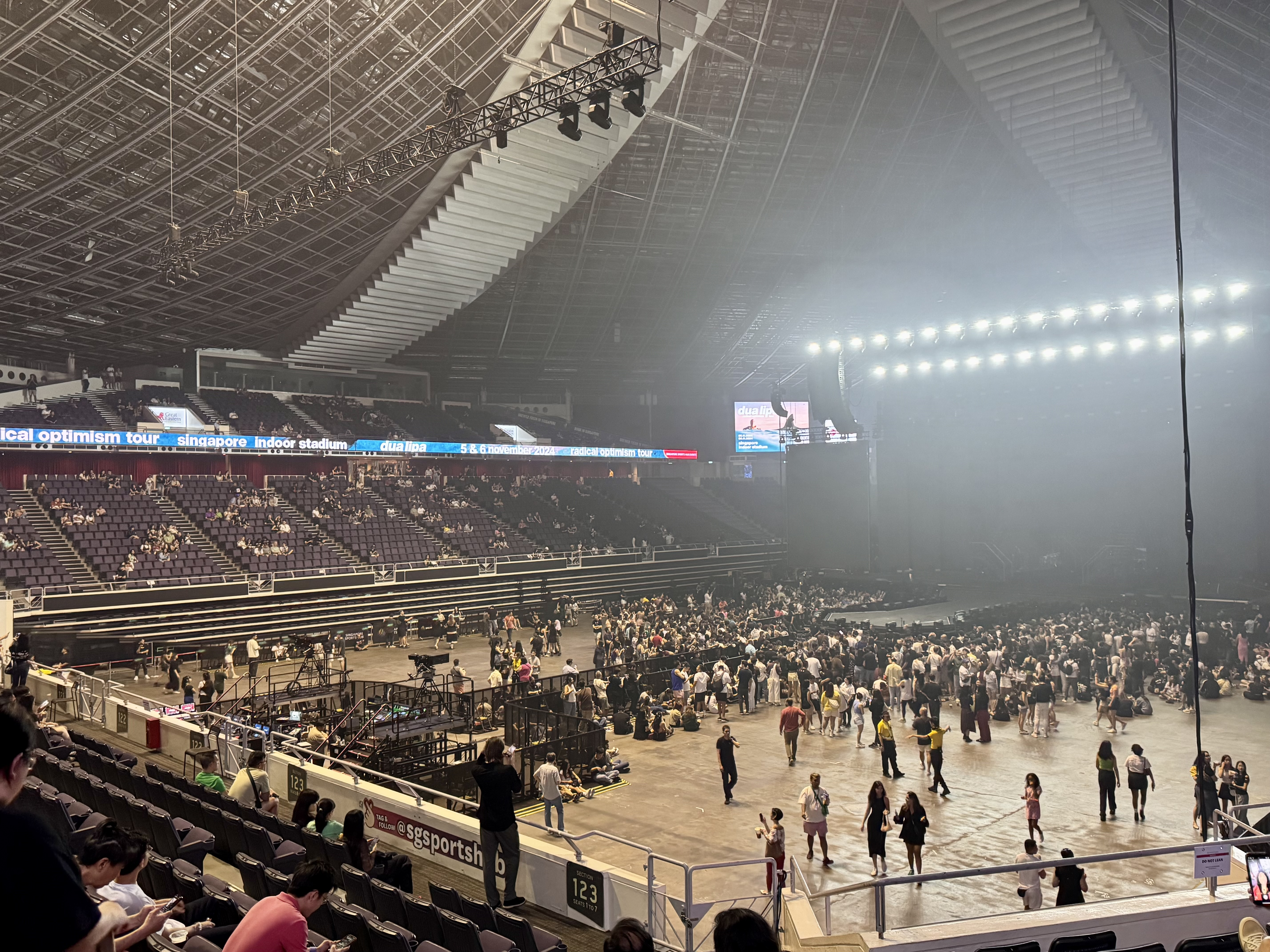
The interior of the Indoor Stadium in 2024.

It regularly hosts events such as music concerts, badminton, basketball, netball, tennis, esports, pro-wrestling, mixed martial arts, kickboxing, and monster truck races. The Singaporean ONE Championship regularly hosts its events here. In 2015, the Singapore Indoor Stadium sold 72,342 tickets for the entire year. In 2022, the stadium was the venue for The International 2022, the annual Dota 2 world championship esports tournament and the largest single-tournament prize pool of any esport event. On 16–18 February 2023, Irish pop band Westlife's three shows made them the first international group to perform at the stadium thrice in one tour.

== History ==
Construction began on 1 January 1985, and it was built at a cost of S$90 million. The arena was designed by Japanese architect Kenzo Tange in partnership with Raglan Squire & Partners, and it has a cone shaped roof and a pillarless arena. It was completed on 1 March 1987 and officially opened to public on 1 July 1988.

On 31 December 1989, Singapore Indoor Stadium was officially opened in an inaugural ceremony by the Prime Minister of Singapore, Lee Kuan Yew.

On 7 March 2024, Minister for Culture, Community and Youth Edwin Tong revealed plans for a new indoor arena to replace the existing Indoor Stadium during an outline of the ministry's spending plans. On 18 August, Prime Minister Lawrence Wong formally announced the new arena during the National Day rally. It is planned to have a capacity of 18,000.

== Capacity ==
Due to its flexible stage configuration, the capacity of the stadium varies 8,000–9,000 during concerts to 8,126–10,786 during sporting events. Its seating capacity is around 12,000, and its full capacity is 15,000.

== Transportation ==
Both the Stadium MRT station on the Circle Line and the Tanjong Rhu MRT station on the Thomson–East Coast Line enables visitors to commute to the stadium via train service. Kallang MRT station on the East–West Line is also within reasonable distance, with a direct connection via sheltered walkways.

== Sporting events ==
Sporting events at the Singapore Indoor Stadium
Year	Date	Events
2008	30 November	2008–09 PBA Philippine Cup – Basketball
2009	29 June	2009 Asian Youth Games – Opening Ceremony
2010	15–19 August	2010 Summer Youth Olympics – Badminton
2010	21–26 August	2010 Summer Youth Olympics – Table Tennis
2011	30 June	2011 ASEAN School Games – Opening Ceremony
2011	8 July	2011 ASEAN School Games – Closing Ceremony
2011	3–10 July	2011 World Netball Championships all 48 matches
2011	3 September	ONE Fighting Championship: Champion versus Champion
2012	31 March	ONE Fighting Championship: War of the Lions
2012	6 November	ONE Fighting Championship: Rise of Kings
2013	5 April	One Fighting Championship 8: Kings and Champions
2013	18 October	One Fighting Championship 11: Total Domination
2014	8–13 April	2014 BWF Super Series – 2014 Singapore Super Series
2014	14 June	ONE Fighting Championship: Honor and Glory
2014	15 & 16 August	2014 PDC Singapore Darts Masters
2014	17–26 October	2014 WTA Finals (tennis)
2014	7 November	ONE Fighting Championship: Battle of the Lions
2014	2–4 December	International Premier Tennis League
2015	7–12 April	2015 BWF Super Series – 2015 Singapore Super Series
2015	1–8 June	2015 Southeast Asian Games – Table Tennis
2015	10–16 June	2015 Southeast Asian Games – Badminton
2015	2 July	WWE Live event in Singapore
2015	25 October – 1 November	2015 WTA Finals
2015	13 November	ONE Fighting Championship: Pride of Lions
2015	3 December	2015 ASEAN Para Games – Opening Ceremony
2015	4–9 December	2015 ASEAN Para Games – Wheelchair Basketball
2015	18–20 December	International Premier Tennis League
2016	12–17 April	2016 BWF Super Series – 2016 Singapore Super Series
2016	6 May	ONE Fighting Championship: Ascend to Power
2016	23–30 October	2016 WTA Finals
2016	11 November	ONE Fighting Championship: Defending Honor
2016	6–8 December	International Premier Tennis League
2017	11–16 April	2017 BWF Super Series – 2017 Singapore Super Series
2017	17 June	UFC Fight Night: Holm vs. Correia
2017	28 June	WWE Live Singapore – Wrestling
2018	17–22 July	Singapore Open – Badminton
2018	23 June	UFC Fight Night: Cowboy vs. Edwards
2019	9–14 April	Singapore Open – Badminton
2019	26 October	UFC Fight Night: Maia vs. Askren
2022	January–December	ONE Championship events (February, October 2020 – September 2022, November 2022)
2022	11 June	UFC 275: Teixeira vs. Procházka
2022	12–17 July	2022 Singapore Open – Badminton
2022	29–30 October	The International 2022 Grand Finals – Dota 2
2023	25 March	ONE Fight Night 8: Superlek vs. Williams
2023	26 August	UFC Fight Night: Holloway vs. The Korean Zombie
2023	21–24 September	2023 FIBA Intercontinental Cup (Singapore)
2023	30 September	ONE Fight Night 14: Stamp vs. Ham
2026	10–13 December	PGL Major Singapore 2026 Playoffs - Counter-Strike 2

== Entertainment events ==
The stadium has hosted major concerts and shows by many famous artists and bands, spanning many different genres.

Events from local artists
Events from Asian and regional artists
Events from international artists

=== 1990–2010 ===
Entertainment events at Singapore Indoor Stadium
Dates	Artists	Events
1990
24 November	Eric Clapton	Journeyman World Tour
1991
20 November	Gloria Estefan	Into The Light Tour
1993
23–24 March	Elton John	The One Tour
13 April	Metallica	Nowhere Else to Roam Tour
1994
24 February	Bob Dylan	Never Ending Tour 1994
1 March	Depeche Mode	Exotic Tour/Summer Tour '94
1995
27–28 February	Janet Jackson	janet. World Tour
3 March	Pearl Jam	Vitalogy Tour
22–23 March	Phil Collins	Both Sides of the World Tour
29 April	Whitney Houston	The Bodyguard World Tour
10 October	Take That	Nobody Else Tour
1996
13 April	Tina Turner	Wildest Dreams Tour
30 May	Def Leppard	Slang World Tour
1997
21–27 November	Jacky Cheung, Nadia Chan, Kit Chan	Snow.Wolf.Lake
1999
1999	Don Moen	Asia Tour (Recorded Album "The Mercy Seat")
26–27 March	Jacky Cheung	Jacky Live in Concert 1999
2000
24 June	Fann Wong	My Story in Concert
2001
25 April	Kelly Chen	Kelly Chen Paisley Galaxy World Tour
27 May	Westlife	Where Dreams Come True Tour
29 July	Coldplay	Parachutes Tour
6 October	The Corrs	In Blue Tour
20 October	Robbie Williams	Sing When You're Pacific Rimming Tour
22 November	Elton John	Songs from the West Coast Tour
2002
17–18 May	Jacky Cheung	Jacky Live Music Odyssey
26 October	Oasis	Heathen Chemistry World Tour
8 December	Red Hot Chili Peppers	By the Way World Tour
2003
28 February	Cliff Richard	Wanted World Tour
24, 26 March	The Rolling Stones	Licks Tour
12 December	Kelly Chen	Kelly Chen Dynacarnival World Tour
2004
4 March	David Bowie	A Reality Tour
8 May	Andrea Bocelli	Live in Singapore
18 June	Sarah Brightman	Harem World Tour
5 October	Various	American Idols LIVE! Tour 2004
1 December	Taufik Batisah; Sylvester Sim	Singapore Idol season 1 Grand Finalé
2005
8 January	S.H.E	Fantasy Land World Tour
20 July	Siti Nurhaliza	Siti Nurhaliza LIVE 2005
16–18 September	Jacky Cheung, Evonne Hsu, Nadia Chan	Snow.Wolf.Lake
2006
24 January	Backstreet Boys	—N/a
27 January	Dream Theater	Octavarium Tour
23 February	Oasis	Don't Believe the Truth Tour
10 July	Coldplay	Twisted Logic Tour
8 September	Westlife	Face to Face Tour
24 September	Hady Mirza; Jonathan Leong	Singapore Idol season 2 Grand Finalé performances
25 September	Hady Mirza; Jonathan Leong	Singapore Idol season 2 Grand Finalé results
2007
21 January	Rain (정지훈)	Rain's Coming World Tour
27 January	S.H.E	Perfect 3 World Tour
11 February	Cliff Richard	The Here and Now Tour
27 April	Olivia Newton-John	Body Heart & Spirit Tour
30 June	Christina Aguilera	Back to Basics Tour
13–15 July	Jacky Cheung	The Year of Jacky Cheung World Tour 07
1 August	The Cure	4 Play Tour
16 August	Gwen Stefani	The Sweet Escape Tour
22 October	Black Eyed Peas	Black Blue & You Tour
13 November	Linkin Park	Minutes to Midnight World Tour
2008
5–6 January	Jacky Cheung	The Year of Jacky Cheung World Tour 07
4 February	The Police	The Police Reunion Tour
10 March	Backstreet Boys	Unbreakable Tour
25 March	Maroon 5	It Won't Be Soon Before Long Tour
7 May	Elton John	Rocket Man: Greatest Hits Live
7 September	Avril Lavigne	The Best Damn World Tour
29 October	Kanye West	Glow in the Dark Tour
4 November	—N/a	Korean Pop Night
13 November	Rihanna	Good Girl Gone Bad Tour
25 November	Kylie Minogue	KylieX2008 World Tour
2009
23 March	Coldplay	Viva La Vida Tour
5 April	Oasis	Dig Out Your Soul Tour
4 June	The Pussycat Dolls	Doll Domination Tour
18 July	Superband (纵贯线)	Superband World Tour
27 December	Sezairi Sezali; Sylvia Ratonel	Singapore Idol Season 3 Finale – Performances & Results
2010
14 January	Green Day	21st Century Breakdown World Tour
23 January	Superband (纵贯线)	Superband World Tour
3 February	Muse	The Resistance Tour
7 March	Paramore	Brand New Eyes World Tour
17 April	S.H.E	S.H.E is the One World Tour
27 April	Kelly Clarkson	All I Ever Wanted Tour
9 May	Jolin Tsai (蔡依林)	Myself World Tour
12 May	Deep Purple	Rapture of the Deep Tour

=== 2011–2020 ===
Entertainment events at Singapore Indoor Stadium
Dates	Artists	Events
2011
29–30 January	Super Junior	Super Show 3
7 February	Janet Jackson	Number Ones: Up Close and Personal Tour
9 February	Taylor Swift	Speak Now World Tour
15 February	Iron Maiden	The Final Frontier World Tour
23 February	Eagles	Long Road Out of Eden Tour
9 March	Michael Bublé	Crazy Love Tour
12 March	Slash	Slash 2010–11 World Tour
19 April	Justin Bieber	My World Tour
25 April	Maroon 5	Hands All Over Tour
9 May	Avril Lavigne	The Black Star Tour
14 May	Show Lo (罗志祥)	'Dance Without Limits' Encore World Live Tour'
22 May	Rain	The Best Show Asia Tour
29 June	Kylie Minogue	Aphrodite: Les Folies Tour
15 July	—N/a	Korean Music Wave
1 August	The Cranberries	20 Years Reunion Tour
11 August	James Blunt	Some Kind of Trouble Tour
21 August	Paramore	Brand New Eyes World Tour
26–30 August	Jacky Cheung (张学友)	Jacky Cheung 1/2 Century World Tour
10 September	Shinee	Shinee World
3 October	Westlife	Gravity Tour
19 November	2PM	Hands Up Asia Tour
20 November	Elton John	Greatest Hits Tour
29 November	—N/a	2011 Mnet Asian Music Awards
4 December	TVXQ	TVXQ Asia Fan Party
9–10 December	Girls' Generation	Girls' Generation Tour
2012
18–19 February	Super Junior	Super Show 4
27 February	Evanescence	Evanescence Tour
10 March	Duran Duran	All You Need Is Now Tour
20 March	Jessie J	Heartbeat Tour
2 April	The Cranberries	Roses Tour
28 April	L'Arc-en-Ciel	20th L'Anniversary World Tour
5–6 May	Russell Peters	Notorious World Tour
28–29, 31 May	Lady Gaga	Born This Way Ball
22 July	The Stone Roses	Reunion Tour
22 August	The Beach Boys	The 50th Reunion Tour
28–29 September	BigBang	Alive Galaxy Tour
1 December	2NE1	New Evolution Global Tour
8 December	Shinee	Shinee World II
13 December	Sting	Back to Bass Tour
15 December	The Jacksons	Unity Tour
15 December	Elton John	40th Anniversary of the Rocket Man
2013
17 January	Swedish House Mafia	One Last Tour
1 March	Show Lo (罗志祥)	Over The Limit
19 March	Journey	Eclipse Tour
29 March	The Script	#3 World Tour
13 April	CNBLUE	Blue Moon World Tour
26 April	Namie Amuro	20th Anniversary Asian Tour
6 June	Jay Chou (周杰伦)	Opus Jay Chou World Tour
15 June	Mayday (五月天)	Nowhere World Tour
29–30 June	G-Dragon	One of a Kind World Tour
6 July	Super Junior	Super Show 5
5 October	Infinite	One Great Step
12 October	Girls' Generation	Girls & Peace World Tour
26 October	S.H.E (女朋友)	2gether 4ever World Tour
9 November	JJ Lin (林俊杰)	Timeline Tour
10 November	Matchbox 20	North Tour
2014
15 February	Avril Lavigne	The Avril Lavigne Tour
22 February	Cheer Chen (陈绮贞)	Song of Transcient 2014 (时间的歌巡回演唱会)
4 March	Eric Clapton	Live in Singapore
26 March	Bruno Mars	The Moonshine Jungle Tour
14 April	Lionel Richie	All the Hits, All Night Long
16 April	André Rieu	André Rieu & His Johann Strauss Orchestra
3 May	Show Lo (罗志祥)	Over the Limit: Dance Soul Returns World Live Tour
10 May	CNBLUE	CNBLUE Live "Can't Stop"
7 June	Sam Hui (许冠杰)	What A Wonderful World
9, 12 June	Taylor Swift	The Red Tour
15 June	Hillsong United	Welcome Zion
21 June	Jonathan Lee (李宗盛)	李宗盛2014年新加坡演唱会
28 June	2NE1	All or Nothing World Tour
23 August	Exo	Exo from Exoplanet 1 – The Lost Planet
13–14 September	YG Family	YG Family 2014 World Tour: Power
2015
21 April	The Script	No Sound Without Silence Tour
1 May	Super Junior	Super Show 6
11 May	Katy Perry	Prismatic World Tour
2 July	WWE Live Singapore	
11 July	—N/a	SG50 Sing-Along
18–19 July	BigBang	Made World Tour
25 July	Jolin Tsai (蔡依林)	Play World Tour
25 August	Imagine Dragons	Smoke + Mirrors Tour
29 August	Wakin Chau (周华健)	What Shall I Sing Today? World Tour Concert
5 September	JJ Lin (林俊杰)	Genesis World Tour
26 September	Muse	Drones World Tour
7–8 November	Taylor Swift	The 1989 World Tour
10 November	S.H.E (女朋友); Aaron Yan (炎亚纶)	Forever Stars
2016
9–10 January	Exo	Exo Planet 2 – The Exo'luxion
30 January	Stella Zhang (张清芳)	Stella Zhang Qing Fang Live in Singapore 2016
13 February	CNBLUE	Come Together
5 March	Hebe Tien (田馥甄)	If World Tour
11–13, 17–20 March	Disney on Ice: Magical Ice Festival	
26 May	Jessie J	Sweet Talker World Tour
18 June	—N/a	AL!VE Singapore 活出自己音乐会
24 July	iKon	iKoncert 2016: Showtime Tour
27 July	Selena Gomez	Revival Tour
5–6 August	Mayday (五月天)	Just Rock It! World Tour
10 September	Kit Chan (陈洁仪)	Kit Chan Spellbound Homecoming Concert 2016
24 September	Fish Leong (梁静茹)	Tu t'Appelles l'Amour 2015 – 2016 World Tour
2 October	BigBang	Made V.I.P Tour
19 November	Alan Tam (谭咏麟)	40th Anniversary Concert Tour
3 December	Maher Zain	"One" Concert Tour
2017
22 January	Metallica	WorldWired Tour
11 February	F.T. Island	2017 F.T. Island Live [The Truth]
24–26 February	Jacky Cheung (张学友)	A Classic Tour
15–19 March	The Wonderful World of Disney on Ice	
2 April	Exo	Exo Planet 3 – The Exo'rdium
20 May	Voices of Harmony 2017 (千年一音)	
28 May	Sting	57th & 9th Tour
9–10 June	A-Mei (张惠妹)	Utopia 2.0 Carnival World Tour
24–25 June	G-Dragon	Act III: M.O.T.T.E World Tour
30 June	Britney Spears	Britney: Live in Concert
22 July	Grasshopper (草蜢)	Grasshopper Music Walker Concert
25 July	The xx	I See You Tour
12–13 August	G.E.M.	Queen of Hearts World Tour
26 August	Wakin Chau (周华健)	Wakin Chau 2017 World Tour
2 September	Michael Learns To Rock	Eternal Asia Tour 2017
11–12 November	Ed Sheeran	÷ Tour
15–17 December	Mayday (五月天)	Mayday 2017 Life Tour
2018
7 January	Imagine Dragons	Evolve World Tour
27 January	Super Junior	Super Show 7
9–11 February	Jacky Cheung (张学友)	A Classic Tour
21 February	—N/a	Stargram 2018 Launch K-POP Show in Singapore
3 March	Exo	Exo Planet 4 – The Elyxion
8 April	Katy Perry	Witness: The Tour
12 April	The Script	Freedom Child Tour
3 May	Harry Styles	Live on Tour
6–7 May	Bruno Mars	24K Magic World Tour
17 June	Twice	Twiceland Zone 2 – Fantasy Park
13 July	Wanna One	One: The World
15–16, 18–19 August	JJ Lin (林俊杰)	Sanctuary World Tour
21 August	Boyzone	BZ20 Tour
7–9 September	—N/a	HallyuPopFest 2018
21 September	Seventeen	Seventeen Concert 'Ideal Cut' 2018
2–3 October	Sam Smith	The Thrill of It All Tour
5 November	Kygo	Kids in Love Tour
17 November	Joker Xue	Skyscraper World Tour
5 December	The Weeknd	The Weeknd Asia Tour
2019
15 February	Blackpink	In Your Area World Tour
25–26 May	—N/a	HallyuPopFest 2019
6 July	5566	SINCE 5566 Live in Singapore 2019
13 July	Twice	Twicelights World Tour
20 July	NCT 127	Neo City – The Origin
16 August	Kang Daniel	Kang Daniel Fan Meeting: Color on Me in Singapore
15 September	Exo	Exo Planet 5 – Exploration
25–28 September	Andy Lau (刘德华)	My Love Andy Lau World Tour
4 October	Shawn Mendes	Shawn Mendes: The Tour
12 October	Fei Yu-ching (費玉清)	Fei Yu Qing Farewell Concert Encore Show
30 October	Backstreet Boys	DNA World Tour
9–10 November	—N/a	KAMP K-pop Music Festival 2019

=== 2021–present ===
Entertainment events at Singapore Indoor Stadium
Dates	Artists	Events
2022
2 July	NCT 127	Neo City – The Link
3 September	Super Junior	Super Show 9: Road
13 October	Seventeen	Be the Sun World Tour
26 November	Local and regional artistes	SingLang 2022 Concert
23 December	Jackson Wang	Magic Man World Tour
2023
5 February	Stray Kids	Maniac World Tour
16–18 February	Westlife	The Wild Dreams Tour
28 February	Arctic Monkeys	The Car Tour
11–12, 15–19 March	Disney on Ice	Magic in the Stars (16 shows)
4 March	Anirudh Ravichander	Once Upon a Time Tour
1 April	Tomorrow X Together	Act: Sweet Mirage
8 April	Treasure	Treasure Tour Hello
1 May	NCT Dream	The Dream Show 2: In A Dream
16–18 June	Agust D (Suga)	D-Day Tour
28 June	Jing Long, Ahrong, Ahhan	Hitz Concert 2023
7–8 July	A-Mei	ASMR World Tour
14–16, 21–23, 28–30 July, 3–4 August	Jacky Cheung	Jacky Cheung 60+ Concert Tour
19–20 August	Taeyeon	The Odd of Love
2–3 September	Twice	Ready to Be World Tour
5 September	Lauv	The Between Albums Tour
9 September	Ateez	The Fellowship: Break The Wall Tour
29 October	(G)I-dle	I Am Free-ty World Tour
25 November	10 local and regional artistes	Yes 933 Hits Fest
18 December	One Ok Rock	Luxury Disease Asia Tour
23 December	Jeff Chang	Continuum 2.0 World Tour
2024
5–7 January	Joker Xue	Extraterrestrial World Tour
20–21 January	Enhypen	Fate World Tour
24 February	Ive	Show What I Have World Tour
2 March	Shinee	Shinee World VI: Perfect Illumination
9–10, 13–17 March	Disney on Ice	100 Years of Wonder (17 shows)
30 March	Fish Leong	When We Talk About Love World Tour
6 April	Itzy	Born to Be World Tour
13 April	Kelly Yu	3x3 World Tour
20–21 April	IU	HEREH World Tour
27 April	CNBLUE	CNBLUENTITY
1 May	Mirror	Feel the Passion Concert Tour
9 May	Niall Horan	The Show: Live on Tour
18 May	Power Station	Because of Love World Tour
9 June	Hacken Lee	Hacken Lee x Orchestra Concert
29–30 June	NCT Dream	The Dream Show 3: Dream( )scape
6 July	Local and regional artistes	Xinyao 42nd Reunion Concert
20 July	Aespa	Synk: Parallel Line
27–28 July	A-Mei	ASMR Max World Tour
8 August	D.O.	Bloom Asia Fan Concert Tour
17–18 August	Super 24	Super24 Dance Competition 2024
24 August	Rainie Yang	Like A Star World Tour
30 August	Yoga Lin	Idol World Tour
1 September	Conan Gray	Found Heaven On Tour
7 September	Tomorrow X Together	Act: Promise World Tour
20 September	LANY	A Beautiful Blur: The World Tour
28 September	Zerobaseone	Timeless World
1–2 October	Olivia Rodrigo	Guts World Tour
10–13 October	Andy Lau	Today... is the Day Tour
26 October	Fujii Kaze	Best of Fujii Kaze 2020–2024 Asia Tour
31 October	Local and regional artistes	SingLang 2024 Concert
5–6 November	Dua Lipa	Radical Optimism Tour
11 November	Lisa	Lisa Fan Meetup in Asia 2024
30 November	Anirudh Ravichander	Hukum World Tour
21–22 December	2NE1	Welcome Back Tour
2025
3 February	Cigarettes After Sex	X's World Tour
8 February	The Script	Satellites World Tour
18 February	Niki	Buzz World Tour
22–23 February	Yoasobi	Chō-genjitsu Asia Tour
8 March	Sodagreen	Sodagreen 20th Anniversary Concert Tour
15–16, 19–23 March	Disney on Ice	Magic in the Stars (17 shows)
26 March	Keshi	Requiem Tour
5–6, 12–13 April	Stefanie Sun	Aut Nihilo: Sun Yanzi in Concert
19 April	Wu Bai & China Blue	Rock Star 2 World Tour
26–27 April	J-Hope	Hope on the Stage Tour
3–4 May	Taeyeon	The Tense
17 May	Babymonster	Hello Monsters World Tour
21 May	Ado	Hibana World Tour
14 June	Alan Tam	Classic Legend Tour
21 June	30 local and regional artistes	Xinyao 43rd Reunion Concert
5 July	Ayumi Hamasaki	Ayumi Hamasaki Asia Tour 2025
19 July	Wakin Chau	The Younger Me Concerts Tour 3.0
26 July	Siti Nurhaliza	The Next Wave
16 August	Le Sserafim	Easy Crazy Hot Tour
23 August	D.O. (entertainer)	DO it! Asia Tour
25 August	Black Eyed Peas	Black Eyed Peas – Live in Singapore
28 September	10 local and regional artistes	Yes 933 Hits Fest
3–5 October	Enhypen	Walk The Line Tour
11–12 October	TWICE	This Is For World Tour
18–19 October	NCT Dream	The Dream Show 4: Dream The Future
25 October	Jam Hsiao	Wild/Mild World Tour
1 November	Baekhyun	Reverie World Tour
15 November	Zerobaseone	Here & Now World Tour
21–23, 28–30 November	Jacky Cheung	Jacky Cheung 60+ Concert Tour
10 December	Doja Cat	Ma Vie World Tour
13 December	Jimmy O. Yang	Big & Tall Tour
24 December	Wings	Wings 40th Year Anniversary Tour
27 December	3P	Xin World Tour
2026
2–3 January	Super Junior	Super Show 10
10 January	Crowd Lu	HeartBreakFast World Tour
17–18 January	Tomorrow X Together	Act:Tomorrow
24 January	Riize	Riizing Loud
7 February	Matt Rife	Stay Golden World Tour
22 February	Ateez	In Your Fantasy
28 February	David Tao	Soul Power II World Tour
2 March	OneRepublic	From Asia, With Love
8 March	One Ok Rock	Detox Asia Tour 2026
14–15, 18–22 March	Disney on Ice	Magic in the Stars (17 shows)
27–29 March	Silence Wang	Rise of Romance World Tour
11–12 April	Eric Chou	Odyssey · Stars Tour
18 April	Day6	Day6 10th Anniversary Tour "The Decade"
3 May	Treasure	Pulse On Tour
9 May	Ive	Show What I Am
16–17 May	Daniel Caesar	Son of Spergy Tour
19 May	Laufey	A Matter of Time Tour
13 June	I-dle	Syncopation World Tour
26 July	Exo	Exo Planet 6 – Exhorizon
5 September	Sam Lee	One Day World Tour
12 September	Firdhaus Farmizi	Flat Earth Theory Concert Tour
19 September	Kit Chan	Atrium Live Tour
26 September	Anirudh Ravichander	XV Tour
3 October	Itzy	Itzy - Tunnel Vision
7 October	Hans Zimmer	The Next Level World Tour
13 October	Avenged Sevenfold	Asia Tour 2026
10–11 November	My Chemical Romance	The Black Parade 2026 Stadium Tour
22 November	Simple Plan	The Bigger Than You Think! Tour
28–29 November	Babymonster	Choom World Tour

== See also ==
- Sport in Singapore
- Sport Singapore
