= Gurmit Singh =

Singaporean singer and actor

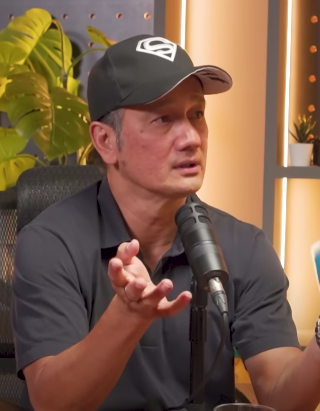
- Singh in 2024
- Born: Gurmit Singh Virk Chainchal Singh; 24 March 1965 (age 61); Singapore
- Education: Outram Secondary School
- Occupations: Actor; comedian; host
- Years active: 1994–present
- Notable work: Phua Chu Kang Pte Ltd; Phua Chu Kang Sdn Bhd; Phua Chu Kang The Movie
- Spouse: Melissa Wong (m. 1995)
- Children: 3

Gurmit Singh Virk, more commonly known simply as Gurmit Singh, (Note: Punjabi: ਗੁਰਮੀਤ ਸਿੰਘ, romanized: Gurmīt Siṅgh; Chinese: 葛米星; pinyin: Gémǐ Xīng) (born 24 March 1965) is a Singaporean actor, comedian, and host. He was prominently a full-time Mediacorp artiste from 1994 to 2014. He is best known for his role as the titular protagonist named Phua Chu Kang in Phua Chu Kang Pte Ltd, Phua Chu Kang Sdn Bhd and Phua Chu Kang The Movie, for which he won the Asian Television Awards prize for Best Performance by an Actor (Comedy) five times, from 1998 to 2001 and in 2003 for the former. From 2004 to 2005, he won the Highly Commended prize.

== Early life ==
Born in Singapore to a Sikh Indian father, Chainchal Singh Virk and a mother of mixed Chinese and Japanese descent, Singh was brought up as a Sikh, but converted to Christianity in 1985. Singh studied in Outram Secondary School during his years in secondary school.

Singh married Melissa Wong in 1995, who is a Cantonese Chinese. They have three children, Gabrielle (born 1997), Elliot (born 2002) and Mikaela (born 2013). Singh is an alumnus of National Police Cadet Corps and held the rank of Cadet Inspector.

Singh is a native English speaker owing to his multiracial heritage and is also fluent in Malay as he learnt it as his Mother Tongue Language at school.

== Career ==
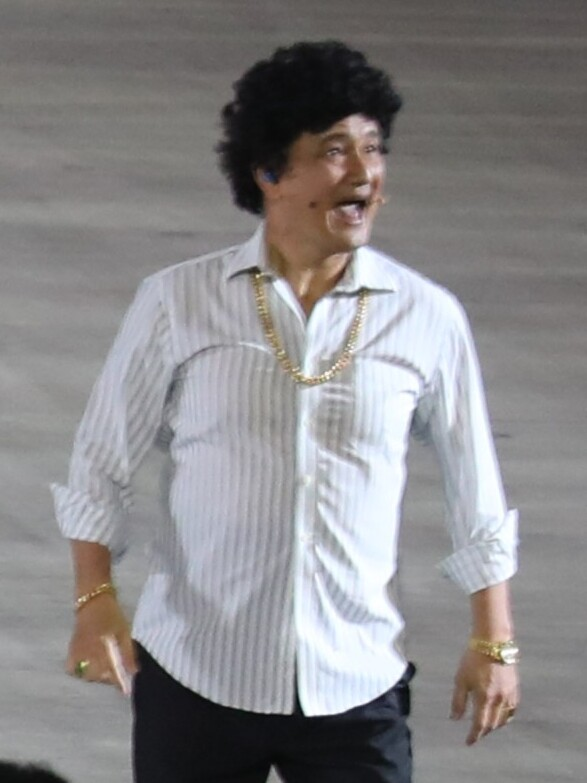
Singh in character as Phua Chu Kang at the 2026 National Day Parade

Making his debut in the variety show named Live On 5 in 1994, he then became the host and lead actor in the sketch comedy sitcom based on him known as Gurmit's World, which was also debuted in 1994 for the 1st season after Live On 5 Season 1 ended. The 2nd season of Gurmit's World, which continued in 1995, Singh portrayed his 'relatives' in a series of skits (unlike the first season where he played a wide assortment of mostly non-recurring characters), featured the first appearance of a character and general contractor named Phua Chu Kang, where he is one of the 6 characters that Singh was portraying in the 2nd season of Gurmit's World. The Singlish-based spin-off sitcom based on Phua Chu Kang known as Phua Chu Kang Pte Ltd in 1997 made Singh a popular icon, not only in Singapore, but also in neighbouring countries (especially Malaysia and the Riau Islands of Indonesia, as well as the Philippines). This factor leads to having another spin-off sitcom sequel based in Malaysia known as Phua Chu Kang Sdn Bhd (2009–2010).

In 2013, Singh was nominated for the Best Actor prize at the 1st Golden Wau Awards, aimed at promoting Chinese-language Malaysian films, for his role in Phua Chu Kang The Movie (2010).

In October 2014, the Madame Tussauds Singapore museum unveiled a wax figure of Phua Chu Kang.

In November 2014, Singh announced that he would leave the entertainment industry at the end of his full-time television career at Mediacorp - after exactly 20 years. Singh shared that he planned to spend more time with his family and would take on engagements on a more selective basis.

In July 2017, Singh was announced by the Dover Park Hospice as the Hospice Ambassador.

In August 2020, Phua Chu Kang was announced and signed as Shopee's first Singaporean brand ambassador.

== Filmography ==
=== Film ===
Year	Name of Film	Role	Notes	Ref
2001	One Leg Kicking	Tai Po	1st Collaboration with Jack Neo and Mark Lee	
2007	Just Follow Law	Lim Teng Zui	2nd Collaboration with Jack Neo; 1st Collaboration with Henry Thia	
2007	Sumolah	Akira		
2010	Phua Chu Kang The Movie	Phua Chu Kang / Phua Ah Pa (Phua Chu Kang's Father) / Phua Ah Kong (Phua Chu Kang's Grandfather from Phua Ah Pa's Side)	Phua Ah Pa only appeared in flashbacks when he was younger during the olden century and dynasty period 2nd Collaboration with Henry Thia	
2011	It's a Great, Great World	Security Guard		
2012	The Million Dollar Job	Alvin		
2013	Taxi! Taxi!	Professor Chua See Kiat	2nd Collaboration with Mark Lee	
2013	Everybody's Business	John Lu	3rd Collaboration with Jack Neo, Mark Lee and Henry Thia	
2013	The Million Dollar Job 2: Raffles' Gold	Alvin		
2016	Young & Fabulous	Mr Boo	4th Collaboration with Henry Thia	
2019	When Ghost Meets Zombie	Priest		
2024	The Chosen One	Bai Yun		
2026	Liang Po Po VS Ah Beng	Liang Po Po's Job Interviewer	4th Collaboration with Jack Neo	

=== Television ===
Year	Name of Show	Role	Notes	Ref
1996	Can I Help You?	Sam Pereira/Phua Chu Kang	Also portrayed Phua Chu Kang in only 1 episode known as Use Your Blain: The Return of Phua Chu Kang episode, reprising his role from Gurmit's World Season 2	
1997	Shiver	Father		
1997–2007	Phua Chu Kang Pte Ltd	Phua Chu Kang	Also portrayed Phua Ah Pa (Phua Chu Kang's Father) in certain episodes	
2002	The Amazing Race 3	Phua Chu Kang	As a cameo appearance, giving out clues to the teams. Originally meant to be the pit stop greeter.	
2003	My Sister Harmie	Rani Kaur's brother		
2003	Brothers 4	Tony Chung		
2003	Baby Boom	Adam		
2005–2008	Lifeline	CPT Daniel De Souza		
2007	80's Rewind	Larry Goh		
2007	The Noose	Multiple characters	Prominently as Roy Terse and Windy Miao	
2008–2009	Calefare	Andy Lau Hong		
2008–2009	Cosmo & George	Cosmo		
2009–2010	Phua Chu Kang Sdn Bhd	Phua Chu Kang		
2014	Say It!	Himself	Season 2	
2018	Fam!	Gordon Toh		
2019	Lion Mums 3	Edmond Silvani	Guest appearance	
2020	Slow Dancing	Gareth		
2022	Sunny Side Up	Alex Rajendran		
2023	Downstairs	Himself	Guest appearance	

=== Skit & Entertainment ===
Year	Name of Show	Role	Notes
1994	Live On 5	Host	
1994	Gurmit's World	Host and lead actor	Portrayed many different characters and also Phua Chu Kang as well
1995	Family Fun Show		
1995	Toa Payoh Roadshow		
1995	TCS 1st Anniversary		
1996	Gotcha!	Host	
1996	Courtesy Show		
1996	TCS 2nd Anniversary		
1996	Singapore National Day Parade	Host	
1997	A National Day Special	Host	
1997	Anti-Smoking Show		
1997	Terry Fox Run		
1997	Courtesy Show		
1997	A Nation Connects		
1997	Singapore National Day Parade	Host	
1997	Anti-Drug Show		
1997	Disney Fest		
1998	Tonight With Gurmit	Host	
1998	Courtesy Campaign 20th Anniversary		
1998	Asian Television Awards Show		
1998	SingTel Hello Concert		
1998	High on Life		
1998	Singapore National Day Parade	Host	
1998	Anti-Drug Show		
1998	Swing Singapore Party		
1998	President Star's Charity		
1999	MediaCorp All Star Charity		
1999	Millennium Swing		
1999	Singapore National Day Parade	Host	
1999	Tonight With Gurmit	Host	
1999	Anti-Drug Show		
1999	President Star's Charity		
2000	Singapore National Day Parade	Host	
2000	Tonight With Gurmit	Host	
2001	2MM		
2001	National Crime Prevention Show		
2001	President Star's Charity		
2002	Miss Singapore/Universe 2002		
2002	Singapore National Day Parade	Host	
2002	Health Matters		
2002	President Star's Charity		
2003	Gurmit's Small Talk		
2003	Singapore National Day Parade	Host	
2004	Singapore Idol	Host	
2004	Singapore National Day Parade	Host	
2005	Our Makan Places: Lost and Found	Host	
2005	A Blessed Christmas	Phua Chu Kang	
2005	Singapore National Day Parade	Host	
2005	Sky Symphony Countdown 2006	Host	
2006	Coffee Talk & Hawker Woks Season 3		Guest appearance
2006	Singapore Idol (season 2)	Host	
2006	Our Makan Places: Lost and Found (season 2)	Host	
2006	Singapore National Day Parade	Host	
2006	President Star's Charity		
2006	Countdown 2007 at VivoCity	Host	
2007	Countdown 2008 at VivoCity	Host	
2008	Don't Forget the Lyrics! (English version)	Host	
2008	Our Makan Places: Lost and Found (season 3)	Host	
2008	Countdown 2009 at Marina Bay	Host	
2009	New City Beat 城人新杂志	Co-hosted with Bryan Wong, Kym Ng and Adrian Pang	
2009	Singapore Idol (season 3)	Host	
2009	Singapore National Day Parade	Host	
2010	Singapore National Day Parade	Host	
2011	Singapore National Day Parade	Host	
2012	Our Makan Places: Lost and Found (season 4)	Host	
2012	Singapore National Day Parade	Host	
2013	Singapore National Day Parade	Host	
2014	Our Makan Places: Lost and Found (season 5)	Host	
2016	Don't Forget to Remember	Host	
2018	Our Makan Places: Lost and Found (season 6)	Host	
2018	Singapore National Day Parade	Host	
2022	Kin: The Farewell Special	Host	
2024 & 2025	Mediacorp's National Day Concert by Gardens by the Bay	Host	
2026	Singapore National Day Parade	Host	

=== Others ===
Year	Name of Show	Role
1998	Beauty World: The Musical	TBA
2000	My Lonely Tarts	TBA
2005	Phua Chu Kang - The Musical	Phua Chu Kang

== Discography ==
=== Albums ===
- Sing Singapore 2002 : One (We Are One) (2002) duet with Tay Ping Hui
- One Leg Kicking Original Soundtrack: 'Calling': "Into The House" (2001)
- Moments Gurmit's debut album (2015)
- Gurmit Goes Local (1995) comedy album

=== Compilations ===
- A Happy Journey Starts Like That! (2009)
- The PCK Sar-vivor Rap (2003)
- Love, No Boundaries: "Into the House" (2001) [album single]

== Awards and nominations ==
Organisation	Year	Accolade	Nominated work	Results	Ref.
Star Awards	2002	Top 10 Most Popular Male Artistes	—N/a	Won	
Star Awards	2003	Top 10 Most Popular Male Artistes	—N/a	Won	
Star Awards	2003	Star Awards for Most Popular Regional Artiste (Malaysia)	—N/a	Nominated	
Star Awards	2004	Top 10 Most Popular Male Artistes	—N/a	Nominated	
Star Awards	2005	Top 10 Most Popular Male Artistes	—N/a	Won	
Star Awards	2006	Top 10 Most Popular Male Artistes	—N/a	Won	
Star Awards	2007	Top 10 Most Popular Male Artistes	—N/a	Won	
Star Awards	2009	Top 10 Most Popular Male Artistes	—N/a	Nominated	
Star Awards	2010	Top 10 Most Popular Male Artistes	—N/a	Nominated	
Star Awards	2011	Top 10 Most Popular Male Artistes	—N/a	Nominated	
Star Awards	2012	Top 10 Most Popular Male Artistes	—N/a	Nominated	
Star Awards	2014	Top 10 Most Popular Male Artistes	—N/a	Nominated	
Asian Television Awards	1998	Best Comedy Actor	Phua Chu Kang Pte Ltd (as Phua Chu Kang)	Won	
Golden Horse Film Festival and Awards	2007	Best Leading Actor	Just Follow Law	Nominated	
