= Maia Lee =

Singaporean singer (born 1983)

- Born: 31 January 1983 (age 43); Singapore
- Other name: Li Zhiying
- Occupations: Singer; businesswoman; writer
- Years active: 2004–present
- Children: 3
- Musical career
- Origin: Singapore
- Genres: Rock; pop
- Member of: The Usual Suspects

Chinese name
- Chinese: 李芝瑛
- Hanyu Pinyin: Lǐ Zhīyīng

Maia Lee (born 31 January 1983) is a Singaporean singer and businesswoman.

== Early life ==
Lee left secondary school at the age of 15.

== Career ==
Lee is part of the local techno trio, The Usual Suspects, who have had three Number 1 hits on the local station WKRZ 91.3 FM: "China Girl", "The Love You Promised", and "Sunburn". "The Love You Promised" has also been released in Japan and Europe, receiving airplay as far as Scandinavia. Famed German dance group Cascada recorded a remix in December 2004.

Lee was 7th-placed in the national talent contest, Singapore Idol in Season 1.

In May 2005, Lee become a celebrity guest interviewer-writer for The New Paper.

In 2018, Lee appeared in Indosiar’s D’Academy Asia.

Lee is a co-founder of the modelling agency, Viva Angels. She announced on Facebook on 23 March 2025 that her agency had ceased operations

== Discography ==
=== Studio albums ===
- Oriental Love (2004; released under The Usual Suspects)
- Emotionally Advised (2005)

=== Compilations ===
(with "The Usual Suspects")

- December 2004: "Techno Party 2005 Countdown" The Love You Promised (Take On Maia remix/Cascada remix edit)
- March 2005: "From Euro With Love..." The Love You Promised (candlelight remix)
- March 2005: "The Downtempo Room" With You (candlelight remix)
- June 29, 2005: "Quake Trance Bestシリーズ第8弾" The Love You Promised (Cascada Remix)
- August 12, 2005: "Nonstop Mega Trance 1 / 电音王朝01" (The Love You Promised / 你承诺的爱, The Dj /滴接)

=== Singles ===
- December 2004: "Sunburn" – The Usual Suspects ft. Maia
- January 2005: "The DJ" – The Usual Suspects ft. Maia
- June 2005: "Moving Along" – The Usual Suspects ft. Maia
- November 2005: "Love Bites" – TV Drama "Tiramisu" Theme song
- October 2006: – "Children – Sunshine Of Our Lives" – "Walking On Sunshine"
- 2008: "With You" – The New Romantics ft. Maia
- 2008: "How Do I Say It?" – The New Romantics ft. Maia
- 2023: "Let Go"
