= Cadet inspector =

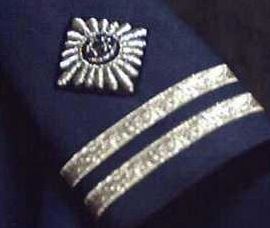
Rank insignia of a Senior Cadet Inspector.

Cadet Inspectors (CIs) are ex-cadets who have completed their secondary school education and volunteered to continue their service in the National Police Cadet Corps in Singapore. They play a similar role to that of warrant officers in the military, not being a cadet nor officer, but in between, possessing a high level of hard and soft skills that can assist in training in their unit.

== Requirements ==
Ex-cadets must meet these following requirements in order to be eligible to apply:

1. They must have graduated from secondary school or be enrolled in a post-secondary educational institution;
2. They must have held the rank of Staff Sergeant or above when they were a cadet;
3. They must be physically fit (pass a medical examination) and have a Body Mass Index (BMI) of 27.5 or less;
4. They must possess all the following badges:
- 2nd Class Drill;
- Campcraft;
- Adventure Training Camp;
- Police Knowledge;
- Total Defence;

5. and have any one of the following badges:

- Marksmanship
- Community Safety and Security Programme
- Swimming
- Kayaking

== Details ==
Ex-cadets who want to become CIs must apply for entry into the course through their Unit's Officer-in-Charge (OC) and then attend the 2-week long Cadet Inspector Basic Training Course (CIBTC) held twice every year in June and December at the Home Team Academy and NPCC Camp Resilience in Pulau Ubin. During CIBTC, they will hold the rank of Cadet Inspector Trainee [CIT (NPCC)] and attend lectures teaching them about Cadet Inspectorship. Upon completion of the course, they will pass out and attain the rank of Probationary Cadet Inspector [P/CI (NPCC)].

After passing the probation requirements, they will attain the rank of Cadet Inspector [CI (NPCC)].

Cadet Inspectors who have served in the Corps for at least 2 years are eligible for promotion to the rank of Senior Cadet Inspector [SCI (NPCC)].

The rank insignia for CIT (NPCC) is one white stripe, while P/CI (NPCC) and CI (NPCC) is one white stripe and a pip, while SCI (NPCC) is two white stripes and a pip.

== Uniform ==
The No. 3 uniform worn by a Cadet Inspector is similar to that of a Cadet, with some slight differences:

Do note that the following differences are for the No. 3 Working Attire dress.

Differences in uniform between a Cadet and a Cadet Inspector
| Area | Cadet | Cadet Inspector |
|---|---|---|
| Head dress | Dark blue beret with a metal NPCC crest attached to it | Peak cap (for males) and a bowler hat (for females) with an embroidered NPCC crest attached to it |
| Collar | No accessories are to be attached to the collar | One embroided collar pin with the NPCC crest on it attached to each collar respectively |
| Chest pockets | Badges are attached at the sleeves and above the left and right chest pockets | Only the SPF-NPCC badge may be attached above the left chest pocket; no badges are to be attached above the right chest pocket and the sleeves |
| Foot wear | Male boots require the user to secure the foot tightly in the boot using a chain knot, female boots require the user to secure the boot using a butterfly knot | Male boots have a zip attached to it; zip is used to secure the foot in the boot, female boots are the same as female cadet boots |

== Opportunities ==
Cadet Inspectors are given the opportunity to return to their secondary school to continue teaching cadets there. They are also given the opportunity to participate in Area events, like their Area's Adventure Training Camp, Area Games Day and Secondary One Swearing-in Ceremony, Headquarters events like shooting competitions and the NPCC Annual Parade, and National events like the National Day Parade.
