= Taufik Batisah =

Singaporean singer-songwriter (born 1981)

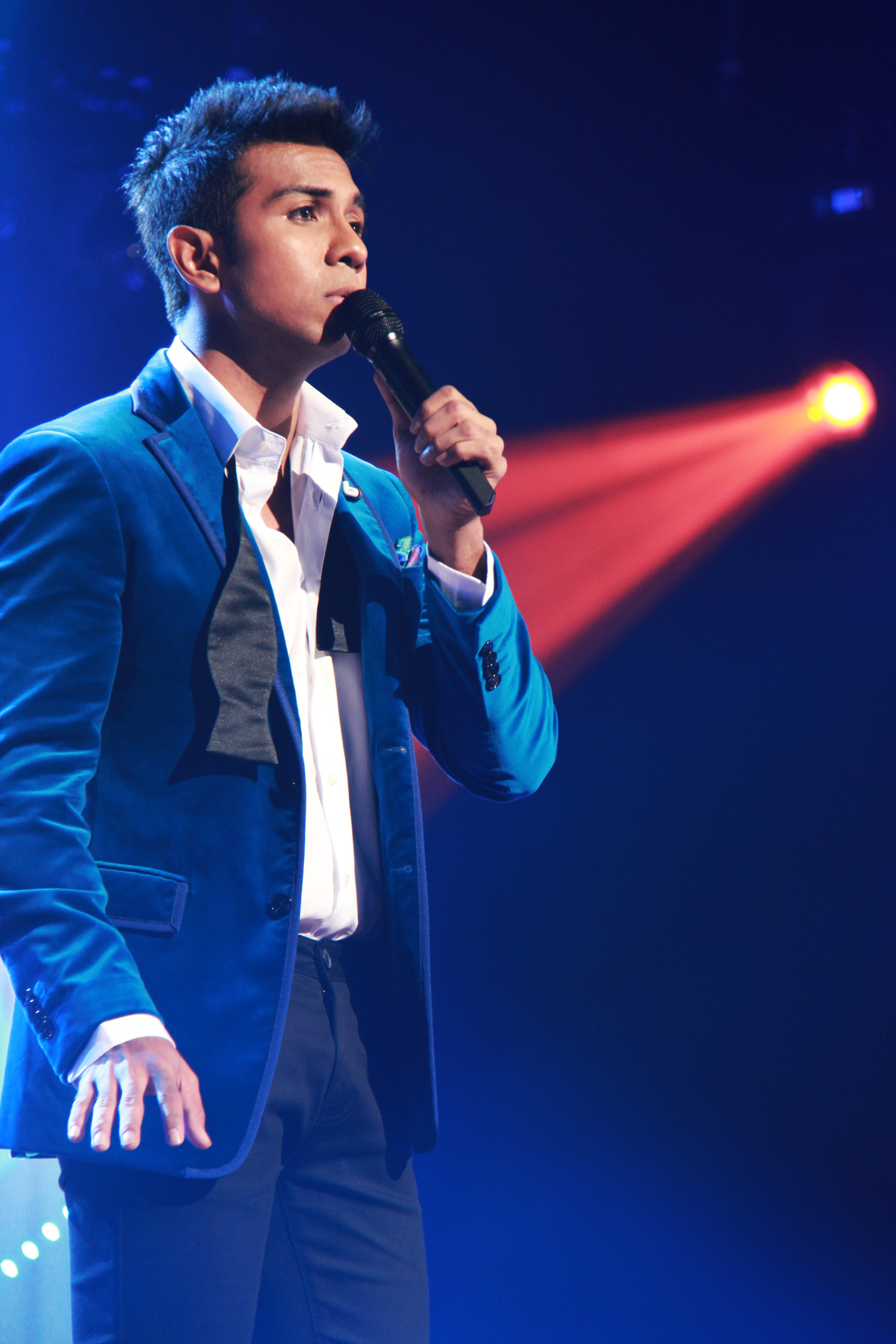
- Taufik performing at ABU TV Song Festival in Seoul, South Korea.
- Born: Muhammad Taufik bin Batisah; 10 December 1981 (age 44); Singapore
- Occupations: Singer; songwriter; actor
- Agent: Hype Records
- Spouse: Sheena Akbal (m. 2015)
- Musical career
- Genres: Pop; R&B
- Instruments: Vocals
- Years active: 2002–present

Muhammad Taufik bin Batisah (Jawi: محمد توفيق بن بتيسه; born 10 December 1981) is a Singaporean singer-songwriter best known for winning the first season of the reality TV series Singapore Idol.

== Early life and education ==
Taufik was born to an Indian Muslim father of Malayali descent and Malay mother of Buginese descent. His parents divorced when he was 13 years old. He attended Boon Lay Primary School (now known as Jurong Primary School), Jurong Secondary School before graduating from Singapore Polytechnic.

== Music career ==
Taufik first started out as a singer in a local group called Bonafide, playing a mixture of hip hop and R&B with fellow rapper, Mark Subramaniam whose stage name is Mark Bonafide.

Taufik participated in the first season of the reality TV series Singapore Idol, part of the Idol franchise based on the British show Pop Idol. in 2004. On 1 December 2004, Taufik became the first Singapore Idol at the Singapore Indoor Stadium before an audience of more than 8,000 fans and 1.8 million viewers across the country. He scored a recording deal with Sony BMG and a management deal under Hype Records' artiste management arm, ArtisteNetworks. It was later revealed that Taufik had won 682,000 of the 1.1 million votes cast that night, while his opponent Sylvester Sim managed 418,000 votes.

Following his win, Taufik clinched a string of endorsements for brands such as Harmuni Rice, Samsung, 7-Eleven stores and HSC drinks. He was the first Singapore artiste to endorse for the Swiss watch-maker, Swatch. He was also the face of the "fresh air for women" campaign in Singapore. This was aimed at reducing smoking in Singapore. However it was shortly pulled due to a member of public documenting pictures of him smoking.

On 14 January 2005, Taufik released his first English album Blessings. The album included Taufik's hits from the competition such as Me and Mrs Jones, Let's Stay Together, Superstition as well as the Idol winning song I Dream. Taufik also co-wrote one track on the album titled Close 2 You. Blessings went on to a smashing sale of 36,000 copies, making into the Singapore Guinness Book of Records as the best selling local English album in the past decade. It remains a record unbroken in the Singapore music industry.

On 19 April 2005, Taufik held his first solo concert showcase An Evening With Taufik at the Kallang Theatre. Fresh from recovering from tonsillitis (resulted from a non-stop four months performing schedule), he charmed both the media and full-house audience with his soulful singing and smooth on-stage moves.

In 2006, Taufik released his second album All Because of You where he wrote and produced eight of the tracks. The English-Malay album spurred off a string of hits and further opened doors to the Malay music industry. Title track All Because of You made its debut that the finals of the second season of Singapore Idol. The three Malay singles on the album Usah Lepaskan, Sesuatu Janji and Sombong took the Malay music industry by storm. He was named the Most Sellable Artiste at MediaCorp Suria's People's Choice Awards and was also awarded the Most Popular Male Artiste Award at the regional Anugerah Planet Muzik 2006. Winning Favourite Artist Singapore at the 2006 MTV Asia Awards further elevated Taufik's career to further heights. An iconic role model, Taufik was also voted as the Winner of Kid's Choice Wannabe Award (Singapore) at the Nickelodeon Kids' Choice Award 2006.

Taufik continued to shine as the top artiste in Singapore, garnering the Most Popular Male Personality Award at Suria's Annual TV awards, Pesta Perdana 2007, the Nickelodeon Kid's Choice Wannabe Award (Singapore) for the second consecutive year, and also the Most Popular Artiste (Singapore) Award, Most Popular Song – Usah Lepaskan (Singapore) Award and the Best Local Song – Usah Lepaskan(Singer/Composer/Lyricist) Award at the Anugerah Planet Muzik 2007. Usah Lepaskan was also the Number 1 Song of the Year on Ria 89.7FM.

In 2007, he debuted his Malaysian album titled, Teman Istimewa (Special Friend) on 5 September and was the album long-awaited by the Malaysian Fiknatics (as his fans are called). Taufik produced 90% of the album and three songs are the Malay version of his earlier English songs Untukmu (First), Berserah (Holding On) and Janjiku Padamu (I Promise Forever). Seribu Tahun (A Thousand Years), a song which he co-wrote, swept the Malaysian radio charts after it became the theme song for Malaysia's Channel TV3 hit drama series, Kerana Cintaku Saerah (Because of My Love Saerah).

In 2008, Taufik won the Most Popular Artiste (Singapore) Award and Most Popular Song (Singapore) Award for his composition Berserah (Surrender) as well as the Best Singapore Artiste Award at Anugerah Planet Muzik 2008. He also received the Singapore Youth Award (Arts and Culture), awarded by the National Youth Council, in recognition of his achievements in the music industry and for being a role model to the younger generation. Meanwhile, Taufik's music compositions also received greater recognition as Berserah took the No. 1 spot for Song of the Year and Teman Istimewa took 5th place on the RIA 89.7FM radio station's 2008 Top 30 Countdown.

Taufik also launched his fourth music album Suria Hatiku (Light of My Heart). This critically acclaimed Malay album showcased a wide variety of songs of different genres and had spurned multiple Number No. 1 hits such as Gadis Itu (That Girl), Nafasku (My Breathe), Hey and Kepadanya (For Him). The album also featured music collaborations between his mentor, Ken Lim, renowned music producer, M. Nasir, and singer, Hady Mirza.

Taufik was named the Most Popular Singapore Artiste for the third consecutive year at the Anugerah Planet Muzik Award 2009. His composition Usah Lepaskan was awarded the top Malay song with the highest royalties by COMPASS. Taufik also performed at the Angureah Planet Muzik Award held in Jakarta and the Singapore Day 2009 event in London. He was also invited to represent Singapore to perform at the ASEAN – Korea Commemorative Summit in Korea and performed at APEC Singapore 2009's "Singapore Evening at The Esplanade".

The year 2010 proved to be an exuberant start for Taufik. Besides fronting the finale performance at the Chingay Parade 2010 and performing for the second consecutive time in Seoul under the invitation of the Ministry of Culture, Sports and Tourism of Korea as well as Singapore's NAC, he continued to receive recognition for his music. He earned the top honour roll of six major awards at the first AnugeraHitz.sg Awards, which honoured the best in the local Malay music industry. The year also saw him diversifying his art and making his theatrical debut in Dick Lee's Fried Rice Paradise – The Musical.

In 2011, he was part of the "Home" video project under Total Defence Campaign and also fronted the "WeAreOne" fund raising project for the Japan tsunami. He also released an Eid ul-Fitr collaboration album Kenangan Di Hari Raya (Memories on Eid) with Hady Mirza.

In August of that year, he represented Singapore and performed with the Asia Traditional Orchestra for Korea's Independence Day in Seoul. He also wrote and recorded a duet single Aku Bersahaja (Simply Me) with Indonesian diva Rossa. The pair debuted the single at Rossa's "Harmoni Cinta" Concert at Esplanade. Aku Bersahaja was released in Singapore and Malaysia and to date, is his eighth Malay No. 1 radio chart topper.

For his achievements in the local music scene, he was honoured with the Yahoo! "Singapore Most Influential Person in Entertainment 2011".

In 2012, his hit ballad 'Usah Lepaskan' was also voted the Most Iconic Song in 55 years of Malay music in Singapore. July of that year saw his return to the English music scene with a new single Sky's The Limit which featured the voice of popular singer-actress Rui En.

Sky's The Limit hit the No. 1 position on 98.7 FM Top 20 Countdown Chart for two consecutive weeks on 7 and 14 September, a rare feat for a local song as the Chart is usually dominated by international acts.

Taufik represented Singapore at the first ABU TV Song Festival 2012 at the KBS Concert Hall, in Seoul, South Korea on 14 October 2012. He performed his multi-award-winning composition -Usah Lepaskan at the international gala music concert alongside high-profile music talents from across the region, including TVXQ (Korea), Havana Brown (Australia), Hafiz Suip (Malaysia) and Perfume (Japan).

Aku Bersahaja with Rossa was nominated for "Lagu Bahasa Melayu Terbaik yang Dipersembahkan oleh Artis Luar Negara" (Best Malay Song performance By A Foreign Artist) at the upcoming Malaysia's annual music award – Anugerah Industri Muzik (AIM) 19, and also for "Kolaborasi Terbaik" (Best Collaboration) in Singapore's Malay regional music Anugerah Planet Muzik.

Taufik also rose in the ranks of the regional and international music scene when he received significant recognition from Korea's Mnet Asia Music Awards (MAMA) for Best Asian Artist (Singapore) as well as Anugerah Planet Muzik's Best Collaboration (for Aku Bersahaja), Most Popular Singapore Artiste and Most Popular Regional Artiste.

On 1 October 2014, Taufik released his fifth studio album, Fique, which he produced, arranged and wrote all but one song. Fique features duets with Malay rapper Altimet, singer Shila Amzah and his aunt, Maria Bachok. Reviewing Fique in The Straits Times, Eddino Abdul Hadi awarded the album four out of five stars and wrote that it was "not so much Taufik, 32, reinventing himself as it is him taking the best parts of his past and moulding them into one cohesive work...a solid collection of songs." TODAY's Kenneth Choy awarded Fique four out of five, calling the album "[e]xpressive, emotive and energetic" plus "truly a good comeback effort with just about the right mix of material that will appeal to new and current fans alike."

At the Anugerah Planet Muzik 2014, Taufik won three awards: Most Popular Song (Singapore), Most Popular Artist and Social Media Icon, winning the most awards by any artist that year. Taufik also performed three songs, including his new single, '#AwakKatMane' (Where Are You), off his recent album, Fique.

In 2018, Taufik represented Singapore at the ASEAN-JAPAN Music Festival in Tokyo, performing alongside Dato Sri Siti Nurhaliza (Malaysia), W-inds (Japan), Sarah Geronimo (Philippines), Andien (Indonesia) and Dong Nhi (Vietnam).

In 2019, Taufik performs the National Day Parade 2019 theme song "Our Singapore", alongside Stefanie Sun, JJ Lin, Ramli Sarip, Dick Lee, Kit Chan, Sam Willows and an inter-generation cast.

On 25 October 2025, Taufik made his debut major headlining concert, "Taufik Batisah: One Last Dance", which was to be his last concert as well. The concert held at The Star Theatre was sold out and Afgan and Rossa appeared as guest singers.

== Personal life ==
On 4 April 2015, Taufik married Nursheehana Akbal, a production manager. During an interview in a podcast in 2026, Sheena revealed that she had six rounds of In vitro fertilisation. She was pregnant in 2023 but miscarried at six weeks.

In July 2018, Taufik started a restaurant, Chix Hot Chicken, which offers fried chicken served in "Nashville-style" style with his longtime friend Bober Ismail.

In September 2019, Taufik joined his elder brother Mustaffa, as a registered property agent under Propnex Realty Pte Ltd to expand himself as an entrepreneur, under the name Batisah Bros Property.

== Discography ==
Studio albums

- 2005: Blessings
- 2006: All Because of You
- 2007: Teman Istimewa
- 2008: Suria Hatiku
- 2014: Fique

Other albums

- 2005: Shooting Stars Original Soundtrack
- 2010: Fried Rice Paradise – The Musical Soundtrack
- 2011: Kenangan Di Hari Raya

VCD

- 2005: An Evening with Taufik

Singles

- 2005: Reach out for the Skies (National Day Parade Theme Song) (with Rui En)
- 2006: Let Her Go
- 2006: I Don't Know
- 2009: Addicted
- 2011: Aku Bersahaja (duet with Rossa)
- 2012: Sky's The Limit (feat. Rui En)
- 2013: Ikrar Kasih (OST Luluhnya Sebuah Ikrar)
- 2014: Awak Kat Mane
- 2015: Izinkanku (Campaign song for Pioneer Generation Package)
- 2016: Like Fireflies (with Ning Baizura & Fazura, composed by Estranged Band | Firefly Airline Campaign song
- 2017: Untuk Kita (Theme song for telemovie "Gunting")
- 2017: Memilih Mencintaimu (feat. Adira)
- 2017: Everyday Heros(Theme Song for Home Team Show and Festival)
- 2017: High On Love (Theme Song for Anti-Drug Abuse Campaign)
- 2018: Ayu (Song collaboration with Malaysian rapper Altimet)
- 2022: Stronger Together (National Day Parade Theme Song)

== Filmography ==
=== Television ===
Year	Title	Role	Ref
2005	Shooting Stars	Himself	
2014 - 15	Maharaja Lawak Mega 2014	Judge	
2016 - 2018	Tanglin	Khairul Anuar	
2018	Gunting- The Series (TV series)	Taufik Salihin	
2025	Provocative	Irfan	

=== Film ===
Year	Title	Role	Notes
2014	Demi Adriana	Dr. Khairul	Telemovie
2016	Dukun Dr. Dani	Doktor Dani	
2017	Gunting	Taufik Salihin	Telemovie
2017	Soulmate Hingga Jannah	Azmeer	

== Stage ==
- 2010 : Fried Rice Paradise – The Musical

== Awards ==
2006

- Pesta! Pesta! Pesta! – Most Sellable Artiste
- Anugerah Planet Muzik 2006 – Most Popular Male Artiste
- MTV Asia Awards 2006 – Favourite Artist Singapore
- Nickelodeon Kids' Choice Award 2006 – Kids' Choice Award Wannabe Award (Singapore)

2007

- Pesta Perdana 9 – Most Popular Male Personality
- Nickelodeon Kids' Choice Award 2007 – Kids' Choice Award Wannabe Award (Singapore)
- Anugerah Planet Muzik 2007 – Most Popular Singapore Artiste
- Anugerah Planet Muzik 2007 – Most Popular Singapore Song ("Usah Lepaskan")
- Anugerah Planet Muzik 2007 – Best Local Singapore Song ("Usah Lepaskan")

2008

- Anugerah Planet Muzik 2008 – Most Popular Singapore Artiste
- Anugerah Planet Muzik 2008 – Most Popular Singapore Song ("Berserah")
- Anugerah Planet Muzik 2008 – Best Singapore Artiste
- Singapore Youth Award 2008 (Arts and Culture)

2009

- Composers and Authors Society of Singapore (Compass) Award – Top Local Malay Pop Song ("Usah Lepaskan")
- Anugerah Planet Muzik 2009 – Most Popular Singapore Artiste

2010

- Manja Star Award ("Anugerah Bintang Manja") 2010
- AnugeraHitz.sg 2010 – Best Artiste
- AnugeraHitz.sg 2010 – Best Composer ("Nafasku")
- AnugeraHitz.sg 2010 – Best Album ("Suria Hatiku")
- AnugeraHitz.sg 2010 – Most Popular Song ("Nafasku")
- AnugeraHitz.sg 2010 – Most Popular Song ("KepadaNya")
- AnugeraHitz.sg 2010 – Most Popular Artiste

2011

- Yahoo! Singapore – Singapore 9 Award (in Entertainment Category)

2012

- MediaCorp Suria BandStand Elektra – MOST ICONIC SONG – VIEWERS CHOICE ("Usah Lepaskan")
- Anugerah Planet Muzik 2012 – Most Popular Singapore Artiste
- Anugerah Planet Muzik 2012 – Most Popular Regional Artiste
- Anugerah Planet Muzik 2012 – Best Collaboration, with Indonesia's Rossa in the song "Aku Bersahaja"
- Mnet Asian Music Awards 2012 – Best Asian Artist (Singapore)

2013

- Sri Temasek Award 2013 – Sri Temasek Promising Award

2014

- Anugerah Planet Muzik 2014 - Most Popular Song (Singapore)
- Anugerah Planet Muzik 2014 - Most Popular Artist
- Anugerah Planet Muzik 2014 - Social Media Icon

2015

- Anugerah Planet Muzik 2015-Social Media Icon
- Anugerah Planet Muzik 2015-Most Popular Song (Singapore)
- Anugerah Planet Muzik 2015-APM Most Popular Song
- Anugerah Planet Muzik 2015-MOST POPULAR ARTISTE (SINGAPORE)

2017

- Composers and Authors Society of Singapore (Compass) Award – Top Local Malay Pop Song ("Awak Kat Mane")

2019

- Pesta Perdana 2019 TV Awards [Best Actor in a Leading Role - Drama Special] for telemovie “Gunting”

Awards and achievements
Preceded by N/A	Winner of Singapore Idol; 2004	Succeeded by Hady Mirza
Preceded by None	Singapore in the ABU TV Song Festival; 2012 with "Usah Lepaskan"	Succeeded by Shabir with "Maybe"
