= Hady Mirza =

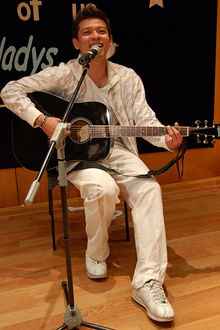
- Hady performing during the HapyHadys Fanclub.

Background information
- Also known as: Hady Mirza
- Born: Muhammad Mirzahady Bin Amir; 28 January 1980 (age 46)
- Origin: Singapore
- Genres: Pop, R&B, Soul
- Occupation: Singer | Entrepreneur
- Instruments: Vocals, Guitar
- Years active: 2006-present
- Labels: Universal Music Singapore; Hype Records Singapore

Muhammad Mirzahady Bin Amir, also known as Hady Mirza (born 28 January 1980), is a Singaporean singer. Known as one of Singapore's most prominent singers of the early 21st century, Hady is most known for his smooth R&B voice and charming personality.

Hady was the winner of the second season of the reality TV show Singapore Idol. He was crowned the winner on 25 September 2006 at the Singapore Indoor Stadium after garnering 70% of about one million votes cast by television viewers. He was also the winner of the world's first Asian Idol competition held on 16 December 2007 in Jakarta, Indonesia. Asian Idol is a competition between six Idol winners from several different Asian countries, namely Singapore Idol, Malaysian Idol, Indonesian Idol, Indian Idol, Philippine Idol and Vietnam Idol.

After a few years of hiatus, Hady made his comeback by joining Gegar Vaganza 6 in 2019. Hady was named co-winner of the sixth season of the Malaysian television singing show, sharing the title with Naqiu Boboy.

== Early life and education ==
Hady was born in Singapore to a family of Buginese ancestry. Hady studied engineering at Temasek Polytechnic in Tampines.

== Career ==
Hady's debut album, self-titled Hady Mirza, was released in Singapore on 13 November 2006 and achieved Platinum status within 4 days of its release. The album is due to be re-released in 2008 with additional material.

Hady was awarded with two major awards in Anugerah Planet Muzik 2007, a yearly Malay music award show awarding the best musicians in Singapore, Malaysia, and Indonesia. Hady was voted "Most Popular Artiste (Singapore)" and his self-penned Malay single Merpati was voted "Most Popular Song (Singapore)". Hady was also voted "Most Popular Artiste (Singapore)" in Anugerah Planet Muzik 2008.

One year after winning Singapore Idol, Hady won the inaugural Asian Idol, a competition featuring Idol winners from six countries: Singapore, Malaysia, Indonesia, Vietnam, Philippines and India.. His two performances were ''Berserah', composed by Taufik Batisah, and U2's Beautiful Day'.

During the results show, he also performed Do I Make You Proud with American Idol Season 5 winner Taylor Hicks and the other Asian Idol contestants, as well as a highly-popular version of George Michael's Freedom! '90 with Malaysian Idol Jaclyn Victor. He also hosted Singapore Idol during the third season.

Hady won awards in three voting-based categories: Most Popular Singapore Artiste, Most Popular Singapore Song, and Most Popular Regional Song, for his hit Angkasa at Anugerah Planet Muzik 2011, an annual award event organised by two Malay MediaCorp Radio Stations, WARNA 94.2FM & RIA 89.7FM. Hady also won awards in two voting-based categories, Most Popular Singapore Song and Most Popular Regional Song, for his hit Ku Tetap Kan Menunggu at Anugerah Planet Muzik 2012.

== Singapore Idol ==
Week #	Song	Original Artist	Result
Top 28	Heaven	Bryan Adams	Proceeded to top 12
Top 12	Rock DJ	Robbie Williams	Safe
Top 11	Maria, Maria	The Product G&B & Santana	Safe
Top 10	"I've Got You Under My Skin"	Frank Sinatra	Safe
Top 9	Freedom! '90	George Michael	Safe Last
Top 8	You've Got A Friend	Carole King	Safe
Top 7	You Give Love a Bad Name	Bon Jovi	Safe Last
Top 6	Lagenda; Party Like This	Sheila Majid; V.E.& Ruffedge	First to be safe
Top 5	I'll Make Love to You; Senorita	Boyz II Men; Justin Timberlake	Safe
Top 4	Kiss; Faithfully	Prince; Journey	First to be safe
Top 3	Got to Get You into My Life; Desperado	Earth, Wind and Fire; Eagles	Safe
Finale	You Give Me Wings; Through the Fire; Freedom90	Winning Song; Chaka Khan; George Michael	Winner

== Gegar Vaganza (Season 6) ==
Week #	Theme	Song	Original Artist	Result
Week 1	Lagu Ke Artis?	"Angkasa"	Hady Mirza	2nd
Week 2	CarMa (Cari Makan)	"Demi Cinta"	Ezad Lazim	2nd
Week 3	Yang Aneh Aneh	"Ibu Kota Cinta"	Def-Gab-C	5th
Week 4	Haa... Tepuk	"Kisah Ku Inginkan" (duet Siti Sarah)	Judika & Dato' Sri Siti Nurhaliza	4th
Week 5	CurHat (Curahan Hati)	"Luluh"	Khai Bahar	6th
Week 6	Melets (Meletop)	"Cinta Luar Biasa"	Andmesh Kamaleng	1st
Week 7	Caras (Cara Sendiri)	"Jatuh Bangun"	Haqiem Rusli ft. Aman RA	1st
Week 8	Reset	"Malaikat"	Hazama Azmi	3rd
Week 9 (quarter-final)	Komposer Hebat Dahulu Sekarang	"Taman Rashidah Utama"	Wings	2nd
Week 10 (semi-final)	Fabulous	"All My Life"	K-Ci & JoJo	1st
Week 10 (semi-final)	Fabulous	"Takdir Tercipta" (duet Dia Fadila)	Hafiz Suip & Adira	1st
Week 11 (finale)	Final Chance	"Ku Bersuara"	Ernie Zakri	CHAMPION
Week 11 (finale)	Final Chance	"Haa Tepok" (duet Naqiu Boboy)	MeerFly ft. Kidd Santhe & MK K-Clique	CHAMPION

== Discography ==
=== Albums ===
Album information
Hady Mirza
- Released: 13 November 2006
- Chart positions (Album): No.1 on HMV, Sembawang Music, CD Rama
- Chart positions (Singles): You Give Me Wings (No.1 on 987FM) / Merpati (No.1 on Ria FM 89.7)
- Worldwide Sales: TBC
- RIAS certification: Platinum
- Singles: You Give Me Wings, Freedom! '90, Merpati (Malay Single)

Album information
Sang Penyanyi
- Released: 15 December 2009
- Chart positions (Album): N/a
- Chart positions (Singles): Angkasa (No.1 for 29 weeks on Ria FM 89.7)- The Longest Running Single ever since its radio debut in 2009 right through 2010.
- Worldwide Sales: TBC
- RIAS certification: TBC
- Singles: Angkasa, I'll Never Leave, Ku Tetapkan Menunggu

Note: In Singapore, albums get platinum status when 15,000 albums are sold, instead of 1 million in the US, due to its smaller population size.

== Filmography ==
=== Television ===
Year	Title	Notes	Ref
2020	Dansa Dan Sing	Co-host with Sherry Alhadad	

== Nominations and awards ==
Year	Award	Category	Result	Ref
2007	Anugerah Planet Muzik	Most Popular Singapore Artiste	Won	
2007	Anugerah Planet Muzik	Most Popular Singapore Song	Won	
2008	Anugerah Planet Muzik	Most Popular Singapore Artiste	Won	
2011	Anugerah Planet Muzik	Most Popular Singapore Artiste	Won	
2011	Anugerah Planet Muzik	Most Popular Singapore Song	Won	
2011	Anugerah Planet Muzik	Most Popular Regional Song	Won	
2012	Anugerah Planet Muzik	Most Popular Singapore Song	Won	
2012	Anugerah Planet Muzik	Most Popular Regional Song	Won	

Preceded by Taufik Batisah	Winner of Singapore Idol; 2006	Succeeded by Sezairi Sezali
