= Singapore Idol =

2004 reality television singing competition

- Created by: Simon Fuller
- Presented by: Gurmit Singh; Daniel Ong (Season 2); Hady Mirza (Season 3)
- Judges: Dick Lee; Florence Lian; Ken Lim; Douglas Oliverio (Season 1); Jacintha Abisheganaden (Season 2)
- Country of origin: Singapore
- No. of seasons: 3
- No. of episodes: 54

Production
- Production companies: MediaCorp Studios; FremantleMedia Operations BV; 19 Entertainment

Original release
- Network: MediaCorp Channel 5
- Release: 9 August 2004 – 27 December 2009

Singapore Idol is a Singaporean reality television singing competition produced by MediaCorp Studios and FremantleMedia Operations BV. It began airing on MediaCorp Channel 5 on 9 August 2004 until 27 December 2009, as an addition to the Idol franchise based on the British show Pop Idol, and became one of the most popular shows in the history of Singaporean television.

The concept of the series is to find new solo recording artists where the winner is determined by the viewers. The series employed a panel of judges who critique the contestants' performances. The original four judges during season 1 were singer-songwriter Dick Lee, Florence Lian, record producer Ken Lim and singer Douglas Oliverio.

In season 2, all the judges from season 1 returned to the show except for Oliverio who was replaced by singer Jacintha Abisheganaden. In season 3, Abisheganaden left the judging panel and the rest of the judges returned to the show. From the start, the show has been hosted by Singapore celebrity and funnyman Gurmit Singh. Radio deejay Daniel Ong was the co-host of the show for season 2, while season 2 winner Hady Mirza replaced him as the co-host during season 3. Through telephone and SMS text voting, Singaporean viewers chose Taufik Batisah, Hady Mirza and Sezairi Sezali as winners throughout the three seasons.

== Season 1 (2004) ==
Season 1 of Singapore Idol premiered on the National Day of Singapore (9 August) in 2004 right after the National Day Parade. This season produced a few memorable, albeit notorious, performers during the audition round. They included Skyy Sia aka Bananaman, who wore a mask of watermelon and bananas; Kelvin Sim, who accompanied his very bad rendition of Fool's Garden's "Lemon Tree" with a dance that rivalled that of William Hung; and Patrick Khoo, who literally whispered George Michael's "Careless Whisper".

As with other shows in the Idol series, the viewers' votes decide who goes on to the next round. This has always produced controversial results in every singing competition. In the third preliminary round, Jerry Ong, whose singing was described by judge Florence Lian as being "constipated" and "weak", was voted through to the finals, beating favourites Beverly Lim Morata and Nur "Nana" Hasanah, both of whom were thought to be better singers. Candice Foo, who got into the finals from the second preliminary round, withdrew from the contest at the last minute due to "financial difficulties". In a bigger upset, Jeassea K. Thyidor, considered by many to be a frontrunner in the competition, was eliminated in the very first round of the finals by a small margin of 200 votes. This sparked a brief, two-week anti-Jerry campaign that lasted until his elimination on 15 October 2004. In the final weeks of the Spectaculars, many speculated that Olinda Cho, one of the most consistent performers, would go on to the Grand Finals with Taufik Batisah, but Sylvester Sim, who had been in the Bottom Group more than anyone else, made it through instead in an upset.

In the final showdown held at the Singapore Indoor Stadium on 1 December 2004, Taufik beat Sim with 62% of the public vote to become the first Singapore Idol. The song both Taufik and Sylvester were required to sing was I Dream. Both received recording deals from Sony BMG on the same day. Taufik's album, Blessings, was released on 17 January 2005. Sim's album, Take Flight, was released on 8 April 2005. Another finalist, Maia Lee, also released an album titled Emotionally Advised on 20 August 2005. Sim was granted a release from Hype Records in mid-2006 due to personal problems. Daphne Khoo also release her debut album 'Desperate' in 2007 and won Best Breakout Solo Artiste, and EP 'Wonderland' in early 2014.

=== Top 11-Top 2 Weekly Song Themes ===
- Top 11 theme: Parents' Choice
- Top 9 theme: Rock 'N' Roll
- Top 8 theme: Live Disco
- Top 7 theme: Song by Favorite Singer
- Top 6 theme: Big Band
- Top 5 theme: R&B/Soul
- Top 4 theme: Asian Pop
- Top 3 theme: Movies and Musicals
- Top 2 theme: Judges' Choice, Contestant's Choice and Winner's Single

=== Finalists ===
(ages stated at time of contest)

Contestant	Age	Hometown	Voted Off	Liveshow Theme
Taufik Batisah	22		Winner	Grand Finale
Sylvester Sim	21		1 December 2004	Grand Finale
Olinda Cho	24		19 November 2004	Movies & Musicals
Daphne Khoo	17		12 November 2004	Asian Pop
Leandra Veronica Rasiah	17		5 November 2004	R&B/Soul
Christopher Michael Lee	19		29 October 2004	Big Band
Maia Lee	21		22 October 2004	Song by My Favourite Singer
Jerry Ong	28		15 October 2004	Disco Hits
David Yeo	22		8 October 2004	Rock 'n' Roll
Jeassea K Thyidor	24		1 October 2004	Parents' Choice
Beverly Lim Morata	25		1 October 2004	Parents' Choice
Candice Foo	19		Withdrew	

=== Elimination Chart ===
Legend
Did Not Perform	Female	Male	Top 30	Withdrawn	Immune from Elimination	Wild Card Public Vote	Wild Card Judges' Choice	Top 11	Runner-up	Winner

Safe	Safe First	Safe Last	Eliminated

Stage:		Top 30			Wild; Card Show	Spectacular Shows (Finals)								Finale
Week:		27/8	3/9	10/9	17/9	1/10 (Note: The Top 11 elimination round featured a double elimination. Beverly Lim Morata was eliminated first, followed by Jeassea K Thyidor.)	8/10	15/10	22/10	29/10	5/11	12/11	19/11	1/12
Place	Contestant	Result												
1	Taufik Batisah			2nd	Immune		Btm 3							Winner
2	Sylvester Sim		Elim		PV			Btm 3	Btm 2		Btm 3	Btm 2		Runner-up
3	Olinda Cho	1st			Immune		Btm 4			Btm 3	Btm 2		Elim	Eliminated (Week 8)
4	Daphne Khoo		1st		Immune	Btm 4						Elim	Eliminated (Week 7)	
5	Leandra Veronica Rasiah			1st	Immune			Btm 2		Btm 2	Elim	Eliminated (Week 6)		
6	Christopher Michael Lee		2nd		Immune		Btm 2		Btm 3	Elim	Eliminated (Week 5)			
7	Maia Lee			Elim	JC				Elim	Eliminated (Week 4)				
8	Jerry Ong			3rd	Immune	Btm 3		Elim	Eliminated (Week 3)					
9	David Yeo	3rd			Immune		Elim	Eliminated (Week 2)						
10–11	Jeassea K Thyidor	2nd			Immune	Elim	Eliminated (Week 1)							
10–11	Beverly Lim Morata			5th	JC	Elim	Eliminated (Week 1)							
Withdrawn	Candice Foo		3rd		Immune	WD (Note: Candice Foo withdrew from the competition a day before the Top 12, citing "financial" reasons. Her departure was too late for any replacement to enter.)	Withdrew (Week 1)							

== Season 2 (2006) ==
Auditions for season 2 were held on 11 February 2006 at *Scape in Orchard Road and was extended twice due to overwhelming response – 12 February at the same location and 19 February in Toa Payoh. The season premiered on 21 May 2006 with clips of the auditions. Dick Lee, Florence Lian and Ken Lim returned as judges while Douglas Oliverio was replaced by Jacintha Abisheganaden. After widespread criticism of his hosting abilities in season 1, Gurmit Singh was paired with Daniel Ong as co-hosts for season 2. Season 1 fourth place finalist Daphne Khoo hosted Singapore Idol on Demand, an online subscription service that provided media downloads and exclusive footage of the show.

A day after the results for Piano Show No. 4 were announced, MediaCorp revealed that a computer glitch in the voting process had mistakenly sent Mathilda D'Silva into the top 12, instead of Nurul Maideen. Mathilda was placed in the wildcard show and was subsequently voted into the finals via the Wildcard. Shortly after the technical glitch fiasco, frontrunner and wildcard contestant Meryl Joan Lee announced her withdrawal from the competition to focus on her studies.

The Top 12 finalists were housed in Hangout @ Mount Emily, a budget hotel, for as long as they remained in the competition. Once the contestant is eliminated on the results night, he/she will head back immediately to Mount Emily to pack up his/her belongings and head back home.

Every Wednesday from 12 July 2006 until the Grand Finale, the Idols competed in the Spectaculars, with a specific theme every week, for instance "No. 1 Hits" and "British Invasion". On the following day (13 July 2006), "Singapore Idol Extra" showed viewers behind-the-scene footage of Singapore Idol. During the Results Show later, viewers were entertained with a live group performance, a music video of the Idols and guest appearances.

The Final Showdown for the title featured Jonathan Leong and Hady Mirza singing three songs each at the Singapore Indoor Stadium. Due to the frequency jam that took place in the first season, the finals was held on 2 separate days; the performance show on 24 September at 8:00pm, and the results show on 25 September at 8:00pm. One of the songs which both contestants sang was "You Give Me Wings", which became the winner's first single. On 25 September 2006, 26-year-old Hady Mirza was declared the winner of Singapore Idol 2006 with about 70% of the votes cast. Hady's self-titled debut album was released in mid-November 2006. Hady would then go on to compete in Asian Idol and become the first Asian Idol on 16 December 2007 in an upset victory.

=== Top 12-Top 3 Spectaculars & The Final Showdown Weekly Song Themes ===
- Top 12 theme: Parents' Choice
- Top 11 theme: #1 Hits from 1996 to 2006
- Top 10 theme: Classic Jazz
- Top 9 theme: Songs by British Singers/Bands (British Invasion)
- Top 8 theme: Home, Family and Friends
- Top 7 theme: Rock 'N' Roll
- Top 6 theme: Asian Pop
- Top 5 theme: R&B and Soul
- Top 4 theme: Judges' Choice
- Top 3 theme: Contestant's Favourites
- Top 2 theme: Contestant's Choice from Judges' List, Spectaculars Encore & Winner's Single

=== Finalists ===
(ages stated at time of contest)

Contestant	Age	Hometown	Voted Off	Liveshow Theme
Hady Mirza	26		Winner	Grand Finale
Jonathan Leong	23		25 September 2006	Grand Finale
Jasmine Tye	18		14 September 2006	Contestant's Favourites
Paul Twohill	17		7 September 2006	Judge's Choice
Joakim Gomez	18		31 August 2006	R&B/Soul
Nurul Maideen	19		24 August 2006	Asian Pop
Mathilda D'Silva	23		17 August 2006	Rock 'n' Roll
Rahimah Rahim	16		10 August 2006	Home, Family and Friends
Jay Lim	27		3 August 2006	Songs by British Singers/Bands
Emilee Kang	28		27 July 2006	Classic Jazz
Gayle Nerva	17		20 July 2006	#1 Hits from 1996 to 2006
Norman Then	18		13 July 2006	Parents' Choice

=== Elimination Chart ===
Legend
Did Not Perform	Immune from Elimination	Female	Male	Top 28	Wild Card	Wild Card Public Vote	Wild Card Judges' Choice	Top 12	Runner-up	Winner

Safe	Safe First	Safe Last	Eliminated

Stage:		Top 28				Wild; Card Show (Note: Meryl Joan Lee was originally offered a Wild Card slot which she turned down. As a result, no wild card slot is taken up.)	Spectacular Shows (Finals)										Finale
Week:		1/6	8/6	15/6	22/6	29/6	13/7	20/7	27/7	3/8	10/8	17/8	24/8	31/8	7/9	14/9	25/9
Place	Contestant	Result															
1	Hady Mirza			1st		Immune				Btm 2		Btm 2					Winner
2	Jonathan Leong	1st				Immune	Btm 3			Btm 3		Btm 3			Btm 2		Runner-up
3	Jasmine Tye		2nd			Immune			Btm 3							Elim	Eliminated (Week 10)
4	Paul Twohill	2nd				Immune		Btm 3			Btm 2		Btm 3	Btm 2	Elim	Eliminated (Week 9)	
5	Joakim Gomez			2nd		Immune							Btm 2	Elim	Eliminated (Week 8)		
6	Nurul Maideen				1st	Immune	Btm 2						Elim	Eliminated (Week 7)			
7	Mathilda D'Silva				Elim	PV						Elim	Eliminated (Week 6)				
8	Rahimah Rahim		1st			Immune			Btm 2		Elim	Eliminated (Week 5)					
9	Jay Lim			3rd		PV		Btm 2		Elim	Eliminated (Week 4)						
10	Emilee Kang				2nd	Immune			Elim	Eliminated (Week 3)							
11	Gayle Nerva		3rd			JC		Elim	Eliminated (Week 2)								
12	Norman Then	Elim				JC	Elim	Eliminated (Week 1)									
Wild Card	Primero Ang			Elim		Elim	Eliminated (Wild Card)										
Wild Card	Choy Siew Woon		Elim			Elim	Eliminated (Wild Card)										
Wild Card	Geraldine Chua		4th			Elim	Eliminated (Wild Card)										
Piano Show 4	Meryl Joan Lee				3rd	Eliminated (Piano Show 4)											
Piano Show 4	Annabelle Lu				Elim	Eliminated (Piano Show 4)											
Piano Show 4	Loh Wan Hua				Elim	Eliminated (Piano Show 4)											
Piano Show 4	Charmaine Pelaez				Elim	Eliminated (Piano Show 4)											
Piano Show 3	Randy Chua			Elim	Eliminated (Piano Show 3)												
Piano Show 3	Tengku Adil Bahdar			Elim	Eliminated (Piano Show 3)												
Piano Show 3	Roslan Mohamad			Elim	Eliminated (Piano Show 3)												
Piano Show 2	Melissa Loo		Elim	Eliminated (Piano Show 2)													
Piano Show 2	Milly Khoo		Elim	Eliminated (Piano Show 2)													
Piano Show 1
Piano Show 1	Terence Tay	3rd	Eliminated (Piano Show 1)														
Piano Show 1	Levin Ng	Elim	Eliminated (Piano Show 1)														
Piano Show 1	James Tay	Elim	Eliminated (Piano Show 1)														
Piano Show 1	Janson Tay	Elim	Eliminated (Piano Show 1)														

Live Show 1 Parent's Choice

Gayle Nerva - I Feel The Earth Move by Carole King

Rahimah Rahim - Perhaps Perhaps Perhaps by Doris Day

Mathilda D Silva - Goldfinger by Shirley Bassey

Hady Mirza - Rock DJ by Robbie Williams

Jay Lim - My Funny Valentine by Mitzi Green

Emilee Kang - Believe by Cher

Joakim Gomez - How Deep Is Your Love by The Bee Gees

Nurul Maideen - Don't You Worry Bout A Thing by Stevie Wonder

Norman Then - High and Dry by Radiohead

Jonathan Leong - Wherever You Will Go by The Calling

Jasmine Tye - Ain't No Mountain High Enough by Marvin Gaye and Tammi Terrell

Paul Twohill - Superman ( It's Not Easy ) by Five for Fighting

Eliminated - Norman Then

== Season 3 (2009) ==
On 15 December 2008, MediaCorp mentioned in its free-circulating-paper, TODAY, that Singapore Idol Season 3 would be one of the new programmes for 2009. The third season comes three years after the previous.

Registration for Singapore Idol 3 officially started on 1 May 2009, and the season premiered right after the National Day Parade on 9 August 2009, 8:30 pm on Channel 5, with subsequent episodes telecast on Wednesdays at 8:00pm from 12 August.

Returning host Gurmit Singh co-hosted with Singapore Idol 2 winner Hady Mirza, replacing Season 2's Daniel Ong. The returning judges were Dick Lee, Florence Lian and Ken Lim, with Jacintha Abisheganaden leaving the show.

The Top 100 contestants were put up at Orchid Country Club at Yishun for a week of intense auditions and training. They were then reduced to a Top 76 for a group round, Top 54 for an Idol first where the contestants write and compose a duet and perform it, then the Top 40 of sang-off at Caldecott Hill. Top 24 consisted of half the contestants (6 males and 6 females) performing each night on 2 separate Piano Shows for a spot in the Top 12. The Piano Show has no theme, and contestants can sing any song they want. The Results Show was screened 30 minutes after the Performance Show. Voting began at the start of the Piano round at 8:00 pm, and closed at 9:45 pm (later extended to 10:00 pm and finally to 10:15 pm). The Top 3 public vote-getters, regardless of gender, advanced together with 3 of the judges choices per episode. Coincidentally, in the piano shows, all the contestants who made it to the next round by public voting were male contestants. There was no Wild Card round for previously eliminated contestants, unlike the previous two seasons.

After the Top 12 was revealed during the second Piano Show results segment, the judges announced that Mae Sta Maria would join the 12 and form a surprise Top 13. The season has received mixed to negative feedback from fans due to the new rulings (absence of the Wildcard round, lack of a gender cap and voting beginning at the start of the show rather than at the end).

It was revealed on 14 September that MJ Kuok, who had gotten into the finals by public voting after Piano Show 1, had withdrawn from the competition on 11 September, citing "personal reasons". The news was confirmed in 8 Days Magazine. He was then replaced by Nurul Huda from Piano Show 1. It was revealed that she had received the next highest number of public votes out of all the other eliminated contestants.

This season also introduced the "Judges' Save", similar to American Idol Season 8, which could be used only when the judges unanimously decide to save an eliminated contestant up to and until the Top 5. The save was never used, when the judges decided not to save Faizal Isa, who was eliminated in 5th place. In retrospect, except for the Top 13 Results Show, where Gurmit explicitly asked the judges if they wanted to save Syltra Lee, the judges' save was hardly, if only briefly, mentioned.

Another first for the franchise was a surprise non-elimination round during the Top 4 Results Show on 25 November, similar to American Idol Season 6, although, unlike the American version where the bottom group was never revealed, Charles and Tabitha were first revealed to be the bottom two before they were announced as safe. Votes for that week were added to the following week's votes, with the contestant with the lowest-combined (Charles) being eliminated the following week.

The order for the final performance show was decided by a coin toss immediately after the Top 3 results show. Sylvia won and decided to go first. The Grand Finale, unlike Season 2, was not a two-night event. The performance was aired at 8:00 pm on 27 December 2009 and the results show at 10:00 pm on the same day. It was held at the Singapore Indoor Stadium with a full capacity of 12,000. The special guest was international recording artist Charice where she performed 3 songs which included her first single Note to God. The Singapore Idol stage will be torn down from the MediaCorp TV Theatre permanently thereafter.

This season was abound with controversy. During the Top 8 and 7, while the judges claimed both nights as "girls' nights", the girls filled up the bottom groups. This resulted in extensive media promotion for the females left in the competition, and the idea of a female idol was fuelled by both the judges and the episodic trailers. However, the last male standing in the Final 3, Sezairi Sezali, still ultimately won, receiving 61% of the votes cast in the finale. While Sylvia became the first female to make it to the finals, Sezairi's win makes all three Singapore Idol winners young Malay males.

=== Piano Shows ===
==== Group 1 ====
Order	Contestant	Song	Result
1	Charles "Stitch" Wong	"Collide"	Advanced
2	Frances Maria	"So What"	Eliminated
3	MJ Kuok	"These Walls"	Advanced^{1}
4	Jannah Shaharuddin	"No One"	ELIMINATED!
5	Farhan Shah	"When You Look Me in the Eyes"	Advanced
6	Ryan Lee	"Moondance"	Eliminated
7	Malaque Mahdaly	"The Voice Within"	Advanced
8	Nurul Huda	"Rehab"	Eliminated^{1}
9	Theodore Teow	"Bless the Broken Road"	Eliminated
10	Douglas Wong	"How to Save a Life"	Eliminated
11	Tabitha Nauser	"One Night Only"	Advanced
12	Syltra Lee	"Black Horse and the Cherry Tree"	Advanced

- Group performance: "Wanna Be Startin' Somethin'"

^{a} Nurul Huda was originally eliminated but was invited back to the competition as a replacement of MJ Kuok, who withdrew from the competition after being voted into the top 13 by the public.

==== Group 2 ====
Order	Contestant	Song	Result
1	Sezairi Sezali	"Sunday Morning"	Advanced
2	Gabrielle Ferdinands	"Thinking of You"	Eliminated
3	Duane Ho	"A Little Too Not Over You"	Advanced
4	Jonathan Cheok	"Come Together"	Eliminated
5	Fathin Amira	"Karma"	Advanced
6	Sylvia Ratonel	"Mercy"	Advanced
7	Faizal Isa	"This Love"	Advanced
8	Charlene Torres-Tan	"Can't Take My Eyes Off You"	Eliminated
9	Benjamin Chow	"At Last"	Eliminated
10	Samantha Lee	"Don't Speak"	Eliminated
11	Justin Jap	"So Sick"	Advanced
12	Mae Sta Maria	"Better in Time"	Advanced

- Group performance: "Burnin' Up"

=== Spectacular Shows ===
==== Top 13 – Chart Toppers ====
Order	Contestant	Song	Result
1	Mae Sta Maria	"Lady Marmalade"	Safe
2	Charles "Stitch" Wong	"Low"	Safe
3	Syltra Lee	"Breakaway"	Eliminated
4	Sylvia Ratonel	"Fallin'"	Safe
5	Sezairi Sezali	"You Give Me Something"	Safe
6	Tabitha Nauser	"Big Girls Don't Cry"	Safe
7	Justin Jap	"Heartless"	Safe
8	Fathin Amira	"Hurt"	Bottom 3
9	Nurul Huda	"Oops!... I Did It Again"	Safe
10	Farhan Shah	"Bad Day"	Safe
11	Malaque Mahdaly	"Hush Hush; Hush Hush"	Bottom 2
12	Duane Ho	"Poker Face"	Safe
13	Faizal Isa	"Stop and Stare"	Safe

- Group performance: "I Don't Care"

==== Top 12 – The Year I Was Born ====
Order	Contestant	Song	Year	Result
1	Nurul Huda	"Walk Like an Egyptian"	1987	Safe
2	Justin Jap	"Together Forever"	1988	Eliminated
3	Tabitha Nauser	"Bohemian Rhapsody"	1992	Bottom 3
4	Charles "Stitch" Wong	"You Give Love a Bad Name"	1986	Safe
5	Sylvia Ratonel	"Sweet Child o' Mine"	1988	Safe
6	Faizal Isa	"End of the Road"	1992	Safe
7	Fathin Amira	"I Love Your Smile"	1992	Safe
8	Mae Sta Maria	"Lately"	1981	Safe
9	Malaque Mahdaly	"Right Here Waiting"	1989	Bottom 2
10	Duane Ho	"I Have Nothing"	1993	Safe
11	Farhan Shah	"Love Will Lead You Back"	1990	Safe
12	Sezairi Sezali	"Faith"	1987	Safe

- Group performance: "You Give Me Wings"

==== Top 11 – An Asian Feast ====
Order	Contestant	Song	Result
1	Sylvia Ratonel	"Sinaran"	Bottom 4
2	Duane Ho	"Dang Ni"	Safe
3	Malaque Mahdaly	"Kuch Kuch Hota Hai"	Safe
4	Fathin Amira	"Bakit Pa"	Safe
5	Sezairi Sezali	"Jeritan Batinku"	Bottom 2
6	Mae Sta Maria	"Nobody"	Safe
7	Faizal Isa	"Hapus Aku"	Safe
8	Tabitha Nauser	"Ting Hai"	Bottom 4
9	Farhan Shah	"Teman Istemewa"	Eliminated
10	Charles "Stitch" Wong	"An Jing"	Safe
11	Nurul Huda	"Made in India"	Safe

==== Top 10 – A Tribute to Michael Jackson ====
Order	Contestant	Song	Result
1	Faizal Isa	"Billie Jean"	Safe
2	Sezairi Sezali	"Thriller"	Safe
3	Nurul Huda	"Ben"	Eliminated
4	Sylvia Ratonel	"The Way You Make Me Feel"	Safe
5	Charles "Stitch" Wong	"Remember the Time"	Bottom 3
6	Tabitha Nauser	"Who's Lovin' You"	Safe
7	Mae Sta Maria	"I Want You Back"	Safe
8	Duane Ho	"The Girl Is Mine"	Safe
9	Malaque Mahdaly	"Rock with You"	Bottom 3
10	Fathin Amira	"You Are Not Alone"	Safe

- Group performance: "Black or White"

On the results show, the "bottom two" was not announced. Gurmit Singh first revealed that Charles, Nurul and Malaque were in the "bottom three". Gurmit then eliminated Nurul immediately and the other contestant which was in the "bottom two" together with Nurul was not revealed.

==== Top 9 – For Someone Special ====
This week, the contestants each perform a song to dedicate to somemore in their life (e.g. friend, family member etc.)

Order	Contestant	Song	Result
1	Charles "Stitch" Wong	"Fall for You"	Safe
2	Sylvia Ratonel	"When You Believe"	Safe
3	Faizal Isa	"I'm Yours"	Safe
4	Malaque Mahdaly	"Because You Loved Me"	Safe
5	Mae Sta Maria	"Hero"	Safe
6	Duane Ho	"A Song for You"	Safe
7	Fathin Amira	"Back at One"	Eliminated
8	Tabitha Nauser	"Halo"	Safe
9	Sezairi Sezali	"Ordinary People"	Safe

- Group performance: "Just Stand Up!"

On the results show, no "bottom three" was announced as the voting results were announced in "random order". Gurmit Singh announced the safe contestants one by one. After Sylvia, Faizal, Malaque, Duane, Tabitha and Sezairi were announced as safe, Charles, Mae and Amira were the last three remaining. Gurmit Singh then eliminated Amira immediately. Charles and Mae were not necessarily among the bottom three vote-getters that week.

==== Top 8 – Mambo Mania ====
Order	Contestant	Song	Result
1	Sezairi Sezali	"Play That Funky Music"	Safe
2	Duane Ho	"Tainted Love"	Safe
3	Tabitha Nauser	"Ain't Nobody"	Bottom 3
4	Charles "Stitch" Wong	"Take On Me"	Safe
5	Sylvia Ratonel	"I Wanna Dance with Somebody (Who Loves Me)"	Bottom 2
6	Mae Sta Maria	"Kiss"	Safe
7	Faizal Isa	"That Thing You Do"	Safe
8	Malaque Mahdaly	"Last Dance"	Eliminated

- Group performance: "Just Can't Get Enough"

==== Top 7 – My Folks Love This ====
This week, the contestants perform a song selected by their parents.

Order	Contestant	Song	Result
1	Faizal Isa	"The Reason"	Safe
2	Sylvia Ratonel	"Warwick Avenue"	Bottom 2
3	Sezairi Sezali	"Georgia on My Mind"	Safe
4	Tabitha Nauser	"Summertime"	Safe
5	Charles "Stitch" Wong	"Fly Away"	Bottom 3
6	Mae Sta Maria	"Over the Rainbow"	Eliminated
7	Duane Ho	"Imagine"	Safe

- Group performance: "Ain't No Mountain High Enough"

==== Top 6 – Killing Me Softly (with This Song) ====
Order	Contestant	Song	Chosen By	Result
1	Tabitha Nauser	"Ain't No Other Man"	Charles "Stitch" Wong	Safe
2	Sezairi Sezali	"What Goes Around... Comes Around"	Faizal Isa	Safe
3	Charles "Stitch" Wong	"Insomnia"	Sezairi Sezali	Bottom 2
4	Sylvia Ratonel	"Will You Love Me Tomorrow"	Tabitha Nauser	Safe
5	Duane Ho	"Paparazzi"	Sylvia Ratonel	Eliminated
6	Faizal Isa	"Always Be My Baby"	Duane Ho	Safe

- Group performance: "Boys and Girls"

==== Top 5 – You Asked for It ====
The contestants are each given a list of songs chosen by the public (a different list for each contestant). They each chose a song from their list to sing.

Order	Contestant	Song	Result
1	Faizal Isa	"Beautiful Soul"	Eliminated
2	Tabitha Nauser	"The Climb"	Bottom 3
3	Sylvia Ratonel	"Cry"	Safe
4	Charles "Stitch" Wong	"Wherever You Will Go"	Bottom 3
5	Sezairi Sezali	"Virtual Insanity"	Safe

- Group performance: "I Gotta Feeling"

On the results show, the "bottom two" was not announced. Gurmit Singh first revealed that Charles and Tabitha were in the "bottom three". Gurmit then eliminated Faizal immediately and the other contestant which was in the "bottom two" together with Faizal was not revealed.

==== Top 4 (first week) – A Song for a Cause ====
In this week, being a week before World AIDS Day, the contestants each compose their own songs to perform as well as a cover song to play their part for charity.

Order	Contestant	Song	Result
1	Sezairi Sezali	"Where Is the Love?"	Safe
2	Tabitha Nauser	"No Matter" (original composition)	Bottom 2
3	Charles "Stitch" Wong	"One"	Bottom 2
4	Sylvia Ratonel	"I'll Be Here" (original composition)	Safe
5	Sezairi Sezali	"You" (original composition)	Safe
6	Tabitha Nauser	"Praying for Time"	Bottom 2
7	Charles "Stitch" Wong	"Before You Hit the Ground" (original composition)	Bottom 2
8	Sylvia Ratonel	"Make You Feel My Love"	Safe

On the results show, Gurmit Singh first revealed that Tabitha and Charles were in the "bottom two". However, the two contestants were then declared safe together with Sylvia and Sezairi and no one was eliminated. Gurmit Singh stated that it was a surprise non-elimination round and votes for that week would be carried over to the following week. The contestant with the lowest combined votes over the two weeks would be eliminated the following week.

==== Top 4 (second week) – Step Up and Dance! ====
Order	Contestant	Song	Result
1	Tabitha Nauser	"Crazy in Love"	Safe
2	Sezairi Sezali	"Mad"	Bottom 2
3	Sylvia Ratonel	"I Don't Need a Man"	Safe
4	Charles "Stitch" Wong	"With You"	Eliminated
5	Tabitha Nauser	"Mama Do (Uh Oh, Uh Oh)"	Safe
6	Sezairi Sezali	"Caught Up"	Bottom 2
7	Sylvia Ratonel	"American Boy"	Safe
8	Charles "Stitch" Wong	"LoveStoned"	Eliminated

- Group performance: "Dance Floor Anthem (I Don't Want to Be in Love)"

==== Top 3 – Judges' Choice ====
Order	Contestant	Song	Chosen By	Result
1	Tabitha Nauser	"Spotlight"	Dick Lee	Eliminated
2	Sylvia Ratonel	"Angel"	Ken Lim	Safe
3	Sezairi Sezali	"Your Body Is a Wonderland"	Florence Lian	Safe
4	Tabitha Nauser	"Superwoman"	Dick Lee	Eliminated
5	Sylvia Ratonel	"Held"	Ken Lim	Safe
6	Sezairi Sezali	"Haven't Met You Yet"	Florence Lian	Safe

==== Top 2 – Favourite Performance / Contestant's Choice / Winner's Single ====
Order	Contestant	Song	Result
1	Sylvia Ratonel	"Mercy"	Runner-up
2	Sezairi Sezali	"Virtual Insanity"	Winner
3	Sylvia Ratonel	"Yellow"	Runner-up
4	Sezairi Sezali	"Crazy"	Winner
5	Sylvia Ratonel	"Touched by an Angel"	Runner-up
6	Sezairi Sezali	"Touched by an Angel"	Winner

- Group performance: "I Gotta Feeling" / "Bad Romance" / "Boom Boom Pow"

=== Elimination chart ===
Legend
Did Not Perform	Female	Male	Top 24	Judges' Choice	Public Vote	Top 13	Runner-up	Winner

Safe	Safe First	Safe Last	Eliminated

Stage:		Piano Shows		Spectacular Shows (Finals)												Grand Finale
Week:		9/2	9/9	9/23	9/30	10/7	10/14	10/21	10/28	11/4	11/11	11/18	11/25 (Note: The 25 November 2009 results night is a non-elimination week. The contestant with the lowest combined votes over the two weeks will be eliminated the following week.)	12/2	12/8	12/27
Place	Contestant	Result														
1	Sezairi Sezali		Top 13			Btm 2								Btm 2		Winner
2	Sylvia Ratonel		Top 13			Btm 4			Btm 2	Btm 2						Runner-up
3	Tabitha Nauser	Top 13			Btm 3	Btm 4			Btm 3			Btm 3	Btm 2		Elim	Eliminated (Week 12)
4	Charles "Stitch" Wong	Top 13					Btm 3			Btm 3	Btm 2	Btm 3	Btm 2	Elim	Eliminated (Week 11)	
5	Faizal Isa		Top 13									Elim	Eliminated (Week 9)			
6	Duane Ho		Top 13								Elim	Eliminated (Week 8)				
7	Mae Sta Maria		Top 13							Elim	Eliminate (Week 7)					
8	Malaque Mahdaly	Top 13		Btm 2	Btm 2		Btm 3		Elim	Eliminated (Week 6)						
9	Fathin Amira		Top 13	Btm 3				Elim	Eliminated (Week 5)							
10	Nurul Huda	Elim	Eliminated (Piano Show 1)	(Note: Nurul Huda was originally eliminated during the Piano Show 1. However, she replaced MJ Kuok as Top 13 after he withdrew from Singapore Idol.)			Elim	Eliminated (Week 4)								
11	Farhan Shah	Top 13				Elim	Eliminated (Week 3)									
12	Justin Jap		Top 13		Elim	Eliminated (Week 2)										
13	Syltra Lee	Top 13		Elim	Eliminated (Week 1)											
14	MJ Kuok	Top 13		WD (Note: MJ Kuok was originally joined in the top 13. A few days later, he withdrew from Singapore Idol, citing "personal reasons".)	Withdrew (Week 1)											
Piano Show 2	Jonathan Cheok		Elim	Eliminated (Piano Show 2)												
Piano Show 2	Benjamin Chow		Elim	Eliminated (Piano Show 2)												
Piano Show 2	Gabrielle Ferdinands		Elim	Eliminated (Piano Show 2)												
Piano Show 2	Charlene Torres-Tan		Elim	Eliminated (Piano Show 2)												
Piano Show 2	Samantha Lee		Elim	Eliminated (Piano Show 2)												
Piano Show 1	Theodore Teow	Elim	Eliminated (Piano Show 1)													
Piano Show 1	Jannah Shaharuddin	Elim	Eliminated (Piano Show 1)													
Piano Show 1	Ryan Lee	Elim	Eliminated (Piano Show 1)													
Piano Show 1	Douglas Wong	Elim	Eliminated (Piano Show 1)													
Piano Show 1	Frances Maria	Elim	Eliminated (Piano Show 1)													

=== Post-Idol ===
Of the 13 Finalists, only the Top 3 contestants have continued to remain in the public eye. Sezairi Sezali and Sylvia Ratonel have released their debut studio albums, Take Two and Sylvia Ratonel respectively. Singles were released from the album and have made it into the Top 10 on the 987FM Top 20 Chart, with the best-performing single being Sylvia Ratonel's "It's Raining" (it peaked at #3). While Tabitha Nauser has not released an album, she collaborated with international artists Sean Kingston, Steve Appleton, Jessica Mauboy and Jody Williams on the official theme song to the 2010 Youth Olympics, "Everyone". Nauser was given the opening lines of the first verse, and her vocals can be heard harmonising with the other artists in the choruses and bridge. The song was released as a CD single, which included an acoustic version of "Everyone" performed by Nauser alone. Successful airplay of the song made "Everyone" reach No. 1 on the 987FM Top 20 Chart, making Tabitha Nauser the first Singaporean vocalist, at least in recent years, to achieve that feat. "Everyone" remained on the top spot for 2 weeks.
