= Sezairi Sezali =

Sezairi
- Born: 6 August 1987 (age 39); Singapore
- Education: LASALLE College of the Arts
- Occupations: Singer-songwriter; musician
- Years active: 2010–present
- Height: 1.73 m (5 ft 8 in)
- Spouse: Syaza Qistina Tan (m. 2016)
- Musical career
- Genres: Pop; Jazz; Soul; R&B
- Instruments: Vocals; piano; guitar
- Label: Independent Artist
- Website: www.sezairi.co

Sezairi Sezali is a Singaporean musician and singer-songwriter. Sezairi rose to prominence after winning the third season of Singapore Idol in 2009.

Sezairi signed with major label Sony Music Entertainment in 2015. In 2016, he released his self-titled EP. On 30 January 2020, he released his latest EP Undertones. In 2022, he became the first Singaporean artiste to achieve more than 100 million streams on Spotify.

== Early life ==
Inheriting genes from his father who is an avid audiophile, Sezairi first discovered music at the age of 5 years old. His very first song was "Isabella", a Malay rock song popularised by the band Search in the 90s. He soon found himself sharing the same love for music. At the age of 14, he picked up the guitar to accompany his singing. That led him to form the band Juxtapose with him as frontman. With the band, Sezairi was first able to hone his skills as a musician, as well as a songwriter. It helped prepare him for what was to come in the Singapore Idol series, a nationwide televised singing competition in 2009.

== Personal life ==
Sezairi solemnised his marriage to long-time girlfriend Syaza Qistina on 23 January 2016. The closed door affair for 150 guests was held at the Timbre Music Academy Hall in Old Parliament Lane, with many of them from the local entertainment scene, including The Sam Willows' Benjamin Kheng, rappers Sheikh Haikel and Kevin Lester.

In August 2016, a grand wedding dinner at the SAF Yacht Club in Changi was held to celebrate Sezairi’s nuptials with his wife. Members of homegrown bands were spotted at the wedding, including The Sam Willows, 53A, composer Jeremy Monteiro and 987FM radio DJ Tabitha Nauser. Comedian Fakkah Fuzz was the emcee for the evening and singer-songwriter Charlie Lim performed a song for the couple.

== Career ==
In 2009, Sezairi participated in the third season of nationwide televised singing competition series, Singapore Idol. He won the season, winning the hearts of many with his boy-next-door charm. He released his debut album "Take Two" in June 2010, with good reviews. "Broken", the first single of the album, was the highest ranking Asian song of 2010 on 987FM, one of Singapore’s top pop radio stations.

He was signed to Sony Music Singapore in 2014 and has released his self-titled EP, SEZAIRI, featuring his first hit single "Fire To The Floor".

In 2020, he released the EP Undertones, featuring evocative ballad ‘It’s You.’ The song has surpassed 10 million listens online and has acquired GOLD certification since its release. ‘It’s You’ was featured Apple Music’s “Best of 2018: Editors’ Picks” Global Playlist, where it sat on the 3rd spot amongst some of the year’s most identifiable and noteworthy songs.

Sezairi has branched out into acting too, with his acting debut in the local historical feature film 1965, and he appeared in W!LD RICE's December pantomime, The Emperor's New Clothes as well.

Sezairi released his third album, Violets Aren't Blue, on 8 July 2022.

Sezairi left Sony Music Entertainment on 28 March 2024 to become an independent artist.

== Filmography ==
=== Movies ===
Year	Title	Role	Notes	Ref.
2015	1965	Adi	Singaporean historical thriller film directed by Randy Ang and Daniel Yun	

== Discography ==
=== Albums ===
Title	Album details	Track list
Take Two	Released: 28 June 2010; Label: Universal Music; Formats: CD	List: 1. "Heart Of The Matter"; 2. "Somebody Like You"; 3. "Would She Know?"; 4. "A Woman And A Man"; 5. "Better Be Home Soon"; 6. "Morning Coffee"; 7. "Just A Lie"; 8. "Matahari"; 9. "Broken, Sunshine"; 10. "Touched By An Angel"

Title	EP details	Track list
SEZAIRI	Released: 2016; Label: Sony Music Entertainment; Formats: Digital download, streaming	List: 1. "Intro"; 2. "Terrified" (featuring THELIONCITYBOY); 3. "Empty"; 4. "It Will Never Mend"; 5. "Better Than"; 6. "Fire To The Floor"; 7. "Terrified" (featuring THELIONCITYBOY) – Acoustic; 8. "It Will Never Mend" – Acoustic

Title	Album details	Track list
Violets Aren't Blue	Released: 8 July 2022; Label: Sony Music Entertainment; Formats: Digital download, streaming	List: 1. "Heart Of The Matter" (feat. Young Cocoa); 2. "Dead"; 3. "Fool"; 4. "Blue" (feat. msftz); 5. "Violets" (Interlude); 6. "Raindrops"; 7. "Restless Love"; 8. "Lullaby"; 9. "Raindrops" (Outro)

=== Extended plays ===
Title	EP details	Track list
Undertones	Released: 2020; Label: Sony Music Entertainment; Formats: Digital download, streaming	List: 1. "Mirage"; 2. "In Secret"; 3. "It's You"; 4. "She Moves"

== Awards and nominations ==
Year	Award giving body	Category	Work	Results	Ref.
2009	Singapore Idol Season 3	Singapore Idol Season 3	Himself	Won	
2015	Anugerah Planet Muzik 2015 (Regional Malay Awards Show)	Best Collaboration Song	"Jangan Coba Berlari"	Won	
