= Hong Kah =

- Subzone of Jurong West Planning Area & Housing Estate

Name transcription(s)
  - Hokkien: 奉教
  - Hokkien POJ: hōng-kà
  - Mandarin: 丰加
  - Pinyin: Fēngjiā
  - Malay: Hong Kah
  - Tamil: ஹோங் காஹ்
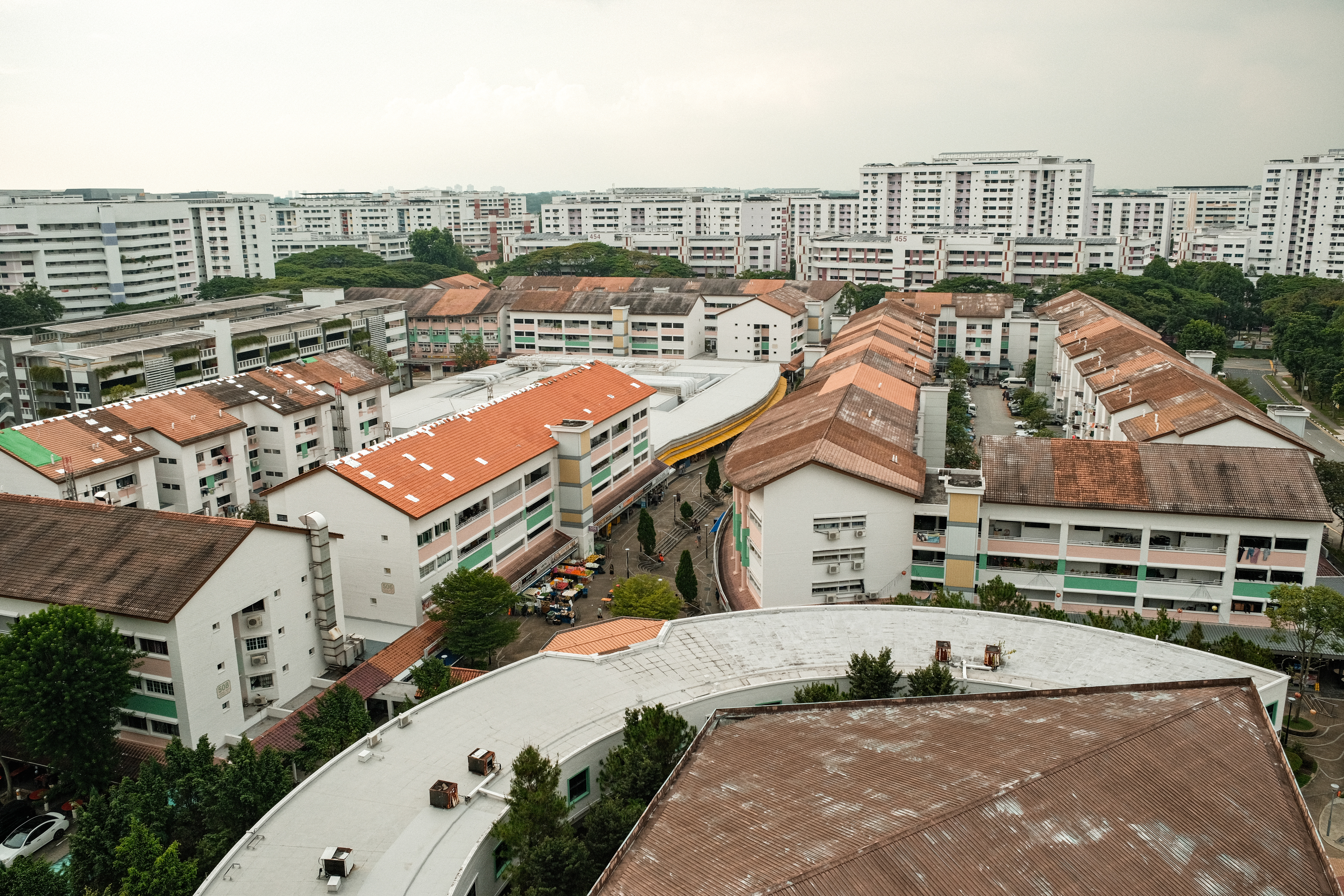
- Aerial view of Hong Kah town centre in 2025

- Location of Hong Kah within Singapore
- Coordinates: 1°20′59″N 103°43′16″E
- Country: Singapore

Area
  - Total: 1.79 km^{2} (0.69 sq mi)

Population (2025)
  - Total: 51,190
  - Density: 28,600/km^{2} (74,100/sq mi)

Hong Kah is a subzone in Jurong West, Singapore. It is bounded by the PIE, Corporation Road, Jurong Canal, Boon Lay Way. It is named after the former Hong Kah Village.

== History ==
Hong Kah is named after the former Hong Kah Village which used to exist north of the present site. The village was located at the 12th milestone of Jurong Road and was established by Chinese Christians, tracing its roots to missionary activities carried out by St Andrew’s Church Mission. The name Hong Kah comes from the Hokkien and Teochew term 奉教 (Pe̍h-ōe-jī: hōng-kà) meaning "bestowing a religion", and was a colloquial reference for Chinese Christians.

== Transportation ==
=== Roads ===
The main roads in Hong Kah are Jurong West Avenue 2, Corporation Road, Boon Lay Way and Jurong West Avenue 1, which connects the precinct to the rest of the island through the PIE exits 31 and 34, to Bukit Batok Road and Jurong West Avenue 2 with minor roads (Jurong West Street 41/42/51/52) winding through the various estates in the precinct.

By 2027, the LTA plans to extend Jurong Canal Drive to Boon Lay Way and from PIE to Tengah Boulevard to accommodate the growing population of Tengah New Town.

=== Public transport ===
==== Mass Rapid Transit (MRT) ====
Hong Kah is currently served by one East West Line MRT station, namely:

- EW26 Lakeside

In 2028, an additional MRT station will serve the western part of the precinct, as part of the upcoming Jurong Region Line, namely:

- JS5 Corporation

==== Bus Services ====
Trunk services 99, 157, 185 and 198, express service 502 and city direct service 657 ply the entirety of Jurong West Ave 1, the main throughfare of Hong Kah. This is supplemented by trunk services 49, 98, 98M and 187 providing residents with a direct connection to Lakeside MRT station.

Hong Kah is also linked to Chinese Garden MRT station through feeder service 335, which also serves Jurong East MRT station together with feeder service 334.

Bus connection to the city is available through City Direct service 657 and express service 502.

Routes	Serves	Destination(s)	Operator	Package
49	Ave 1, St 41, St 42, St 51, Boon Lay Way	Jurong East via Lakeside MRT	Tower Transit Singapore	Bulim
98	Ave 1, St 51, Boon Lay Way	Jurong East	Tower Transit Singapore	Bulim
98	Ave 1, St 51, Boon Lay Way	Jurong Pier via Lakeside MRT	Tower Transit Singapore	Bulim
98M	Ave 1, St 51, Boon Lay Way	Jurong East	Tower Transit Singapore	Bulim
98M	Ave 1, St 51, Boon Lay Way	Corporation Place via Lakeside MRT	Tower Transit Singapore	Bulim
334	Ave 1, St 42	Jurong East	Tower Transit Singapore	Bulim
335	Ave 1, St 41, St 51, St 52, Boon Lay Way	Jurong East via Chinese Garden MRT	Tower Transit Singapore	Bulim
657	Ave 1	Central Business District	Tower Transit Singapore	Bulim
99	Ave 1, Corporation Rd	Clementi	SBS Transit	Clementi
99	Ave 1, Corporation Rd	Joo Koon	SBS Transit	Clementi
157	Ave 1, Corporation Rd	Toa Payoh	SBS Transit	Bishan-Toa Payoh
157	Ave 1, Corporation Rd	Boon Lay	SBS Transit	Bishan-Toa Payoh
198	Ave 1, Corporation Rd	Bukit Merah	SBS Transit	Bukit Merah
198	Ave 1, Corporation Rd	Boon Lay	SBS Transit	Bukit Merah
185	Ave 1, Corporation Rd	Soon Lee	SMRT Buses	Jurong West
185	Ave 1, Corporation Rd	Buona Vista	SMRT Buses	Jurong West
502	Ave 1, Corporation Rd	Soon Lee	SMRT Buses	Jurong West
502	Ave 1, Corporation Rd	Central Business District	SMRT Buses	Jurong West
187	Ave 1, St 51, Boon Lay Way	Woodlands	SMRT Buses	Woodlands
187	Ave 1, St 51, Boon Lay Way	Boon Lay	SMRT Buses	Woodlands

Additional bus services 154, 174, 180, 240 and 246 serve the surrounding roads of Hong Kah but do not directly serve the precinct.

== Schools ==
There are two primary schools (Rulang and Shuqun), six secondary schools (Fuhua, Yuhua, Hua Yi and Jurongville), one international school (Canadian International School) and many pre-school centres in Hong Kah. In 2028, Jurong Pioneer Junior College will move to Hong Kah at 800 Corporation Road.

== Recreation ==
There are 3 neighbourhood parks in Hong Kah, each located at Jurong West Street 41, Jurong West Street 42 and Jurong East Street 32. The nearest sports complex is Jurong East Sports and Recreation Centre, accessible from the rest of the precinct through all the bus services that pass through this precinct.

== Community Centres ==
There are two community centres in the precinct, with Jurong Spring Community Club located in Hong Kah South (Jurong Spring) and Jurong Green Community Club located in Hong Kah East (Jurong Central).

== Town Centres ==
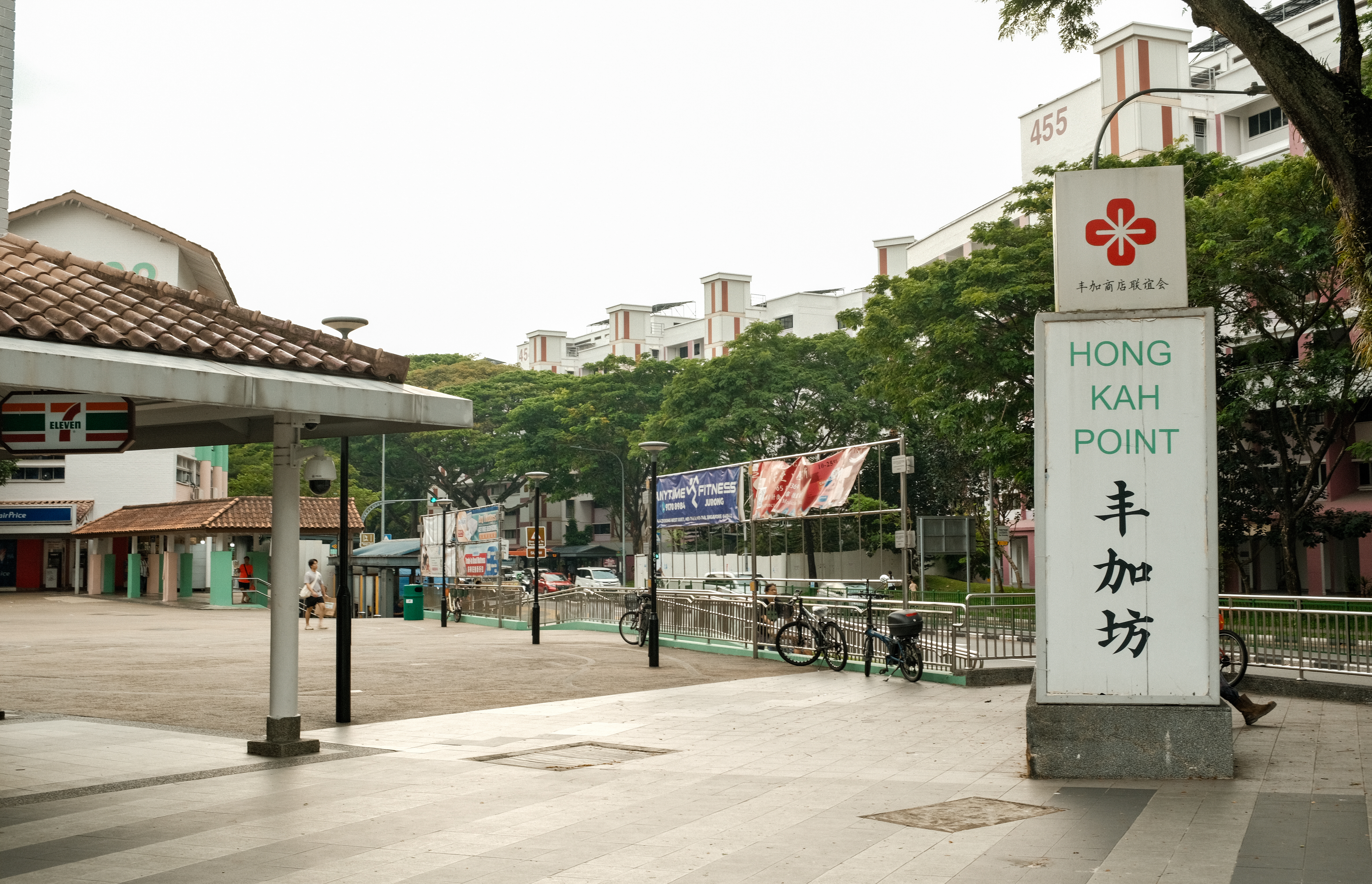
Signboard to Hong Kah's town centre, Hong Kah Point

Hong Kah Point is the town centre of Hong Kah, located at the junction of Jurong West Avenue 1 and Jurong West Street 52, accessible by all the bus services that ply through the precinct.

The town centre features a hawker centre built in 1985, Jurong West Street 52 Market and Food Centre, neighbourhood shops and the West Coast Town Council (Boon Lay) office.

== Places of Worship ==
There are three Chinese temples in Hong Kah:

- Che Wein Khor Temple (紫盈阁), belonged to Church of Virtue, Jurong West Ave 1
- Jurong West United Temple (裕廊西联合宫), Jurong West Street 41
- Jurong Combined Temple (裕廊总宫), Jurong West Street 42

The nearest churches and mosque are located in Taman Jurong and Yuhua.

== Healthcare ==
The healthcare facilities in Hong Kah consist only of private medical clinics. The nearest polyclinic, Jurong Polyclinic, is located in Yuhua.

== Security ==
The Jurong West Neighbourhood Police Centre is located in Hong Kah at the junction of Jurong West Avenue 1 and Corporation Road.

== Politics ==
The precinct's HDB flats in Hong Kah are under the management of Jurong Central and Jurong Spring divisions, which were respectively represented by Xie Yao Quan and Hamid Razak. Prior to the 2025 election, both wards were part of the Jurong GRC which existed from 2001 to 2025, after which Jurong was renamed to Jurong East-Bukit Batok while one of Jurong's divisions, Jurong Central, was hived out as a SMC, and Jurong Spring (alongside Taman Jurong) was redistricted into the neighbouring West Coast-Jurong West GRC. Both constituencies are currently held by the ruling People's Action Party.

The border between both constituencies is currently demarcated by Jurong West St 51 and a canal from Jurong West Ave 1 to the PIE.
