= Jurong Lake District =

Business district in Singapore

Coordinates: 1.337°N 103.7361°E

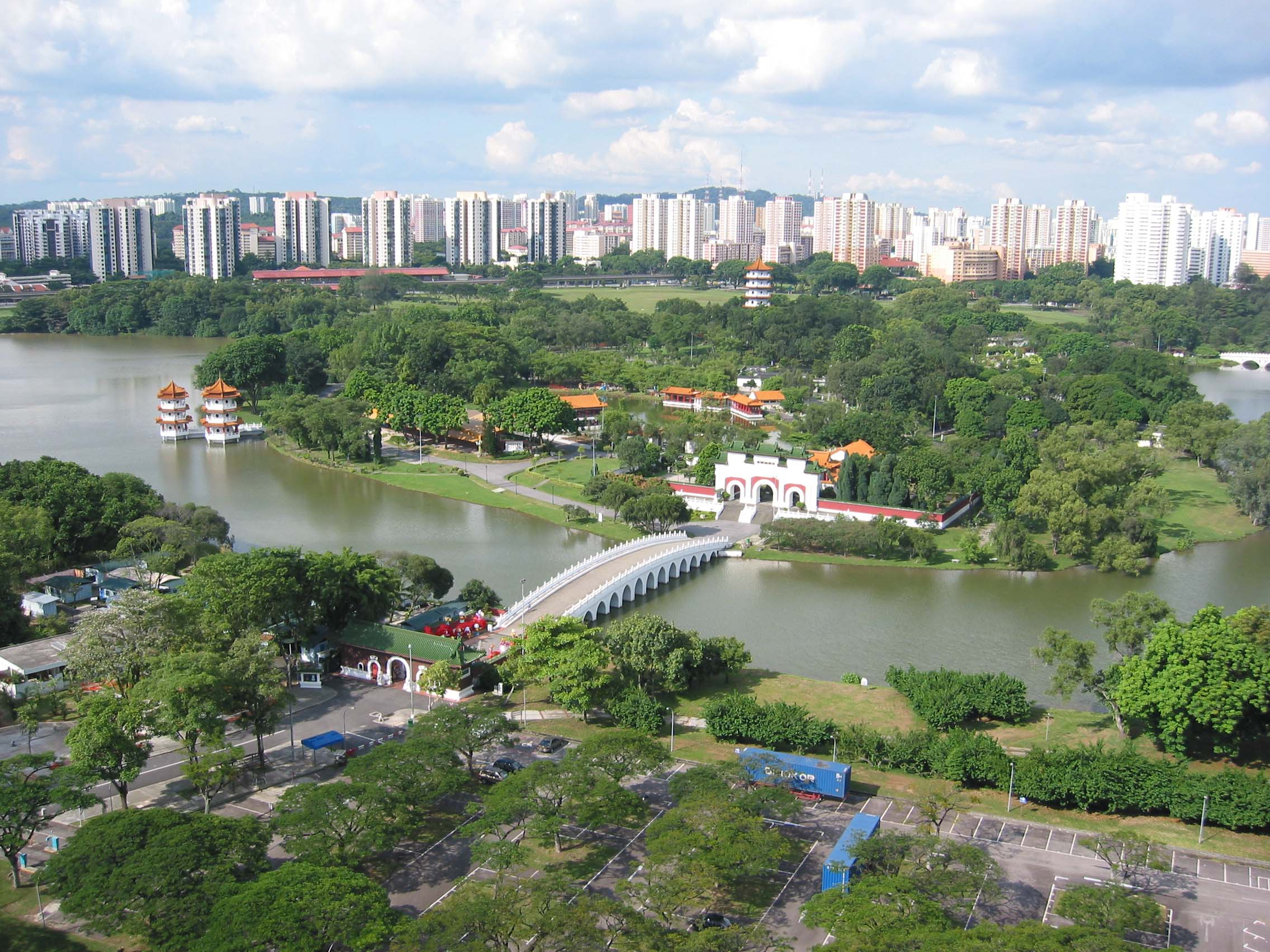
Southern to middle part of Jurong Lake, Singapore

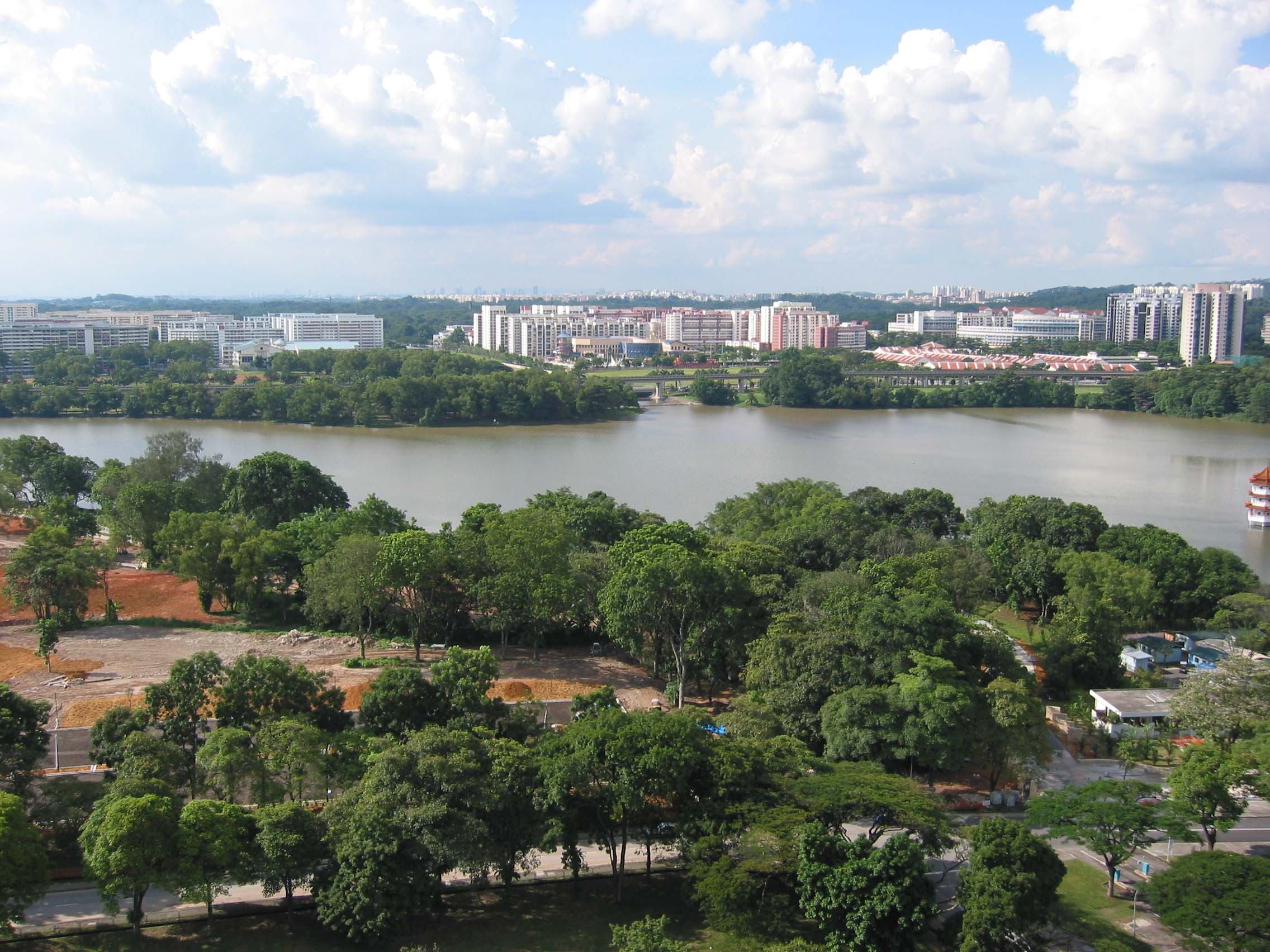
Northern to middle part of Jurong Lake, Singapore

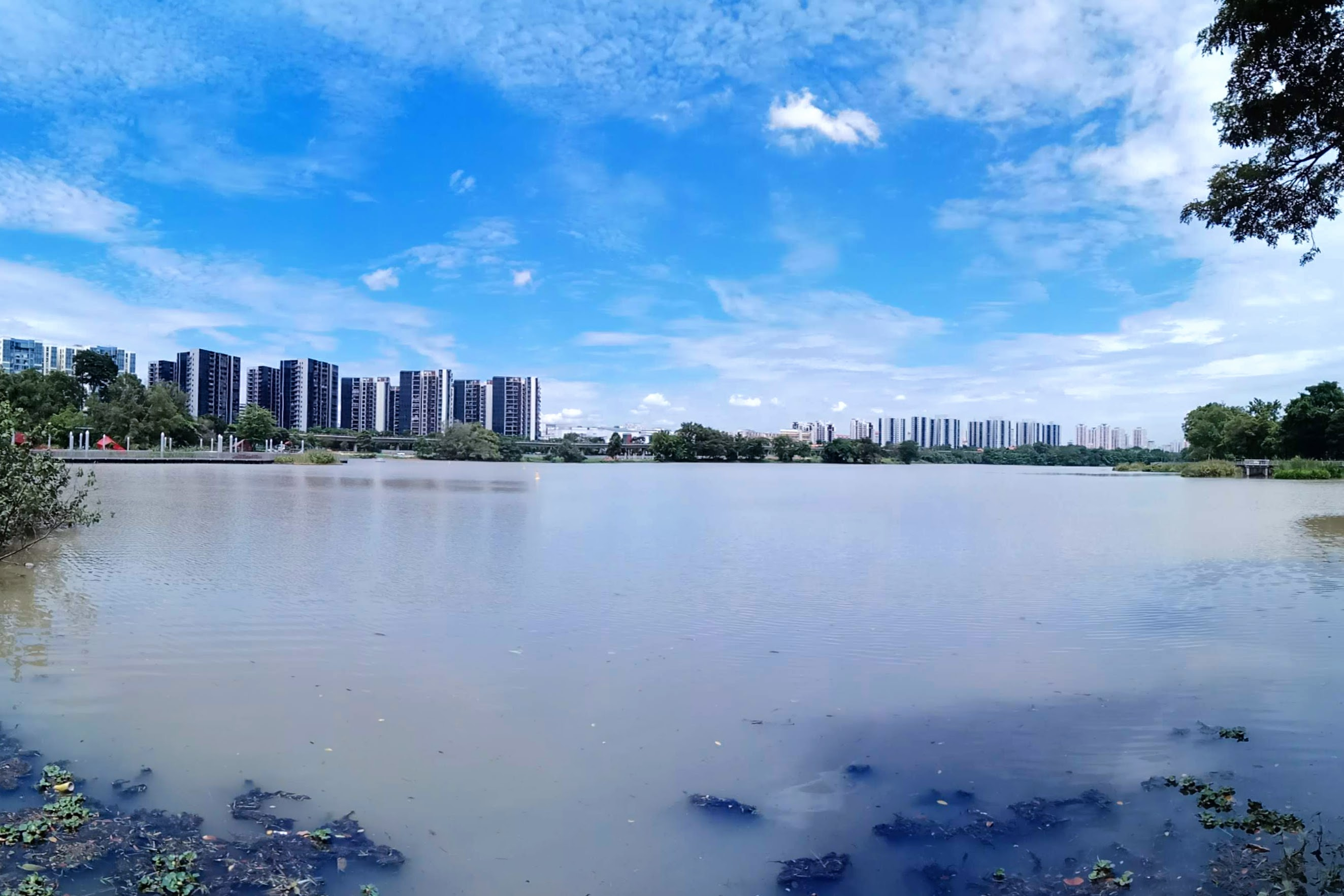
View from Jurong Lake Gardens

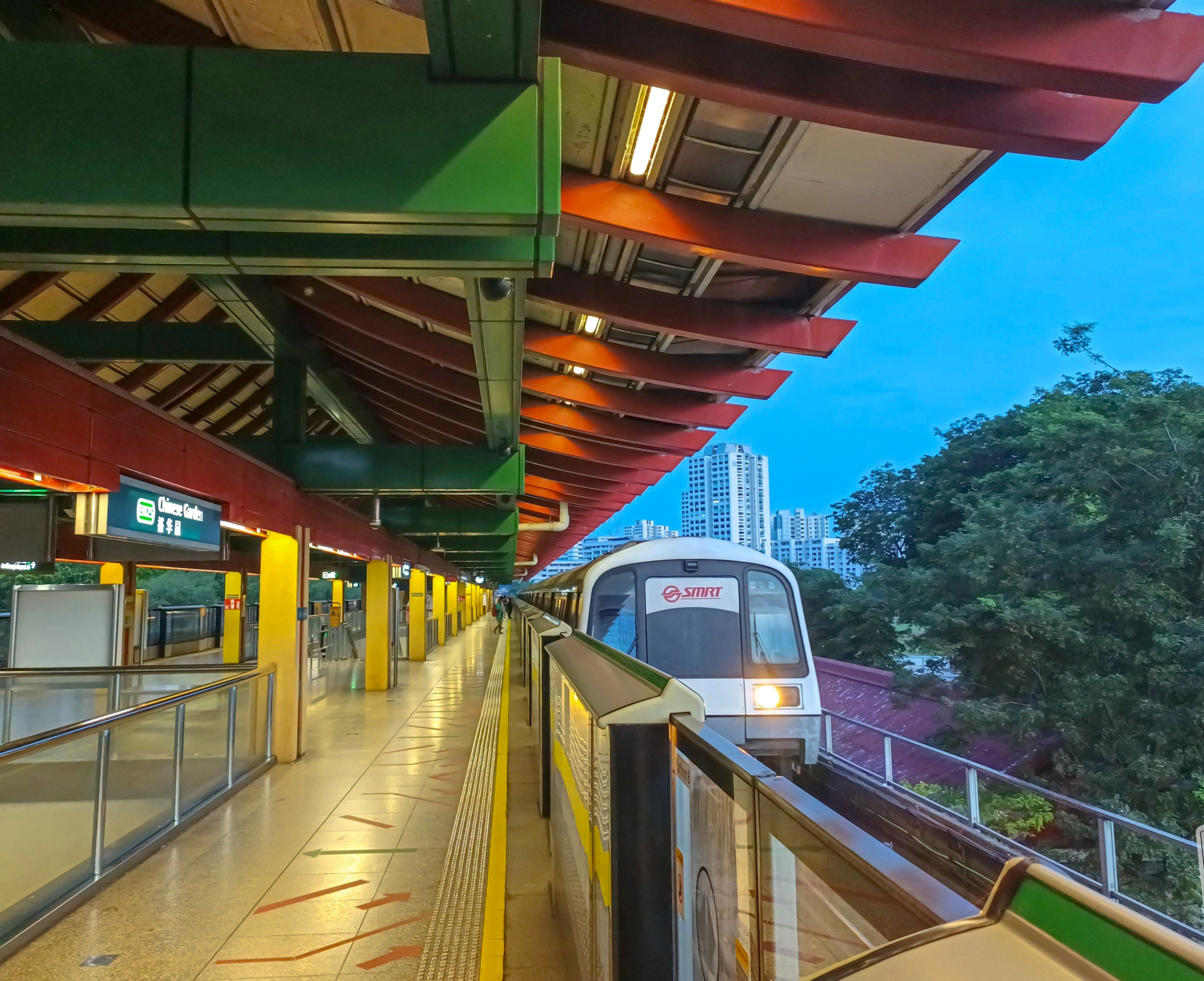
Chinese Garden Station

Jurong Lake District (JLD) is a district in Singapore, planned as part of Urban Redevelopment Authority (URA)’s decentralisation efforts to bring more quality jobs, amenities, and recreational options closer to homes. The plans for the district have continued to evolve since the blueprint was first unveiled in the URA Master Plan 2008. It consists of three precincts, namely Jurong Gateway, Lakeside and Lakeside Gateway. It is 472 hectares (4,720,000 m^{2}) in size and is served by two major expressways and three MRT stations. It is planned to be Singapore's next central business district. In June 2023, a white site 6.5 hectares (ha) in size was released for sale to kick-start development of the largest commercial district outside Singapore’s city centre.

== Lakeside ==
Spread over 290 hectares (2,900,000 m^{2}), residents and visitors can look forward to parks, promenades, water activities and attractions blended in with the lakeside setting.

=== Attraction ===
- Science Centre Singapore (future site)

=== Entertainment, food and beverage ===
- Lakeside Village

=== Leisure ===
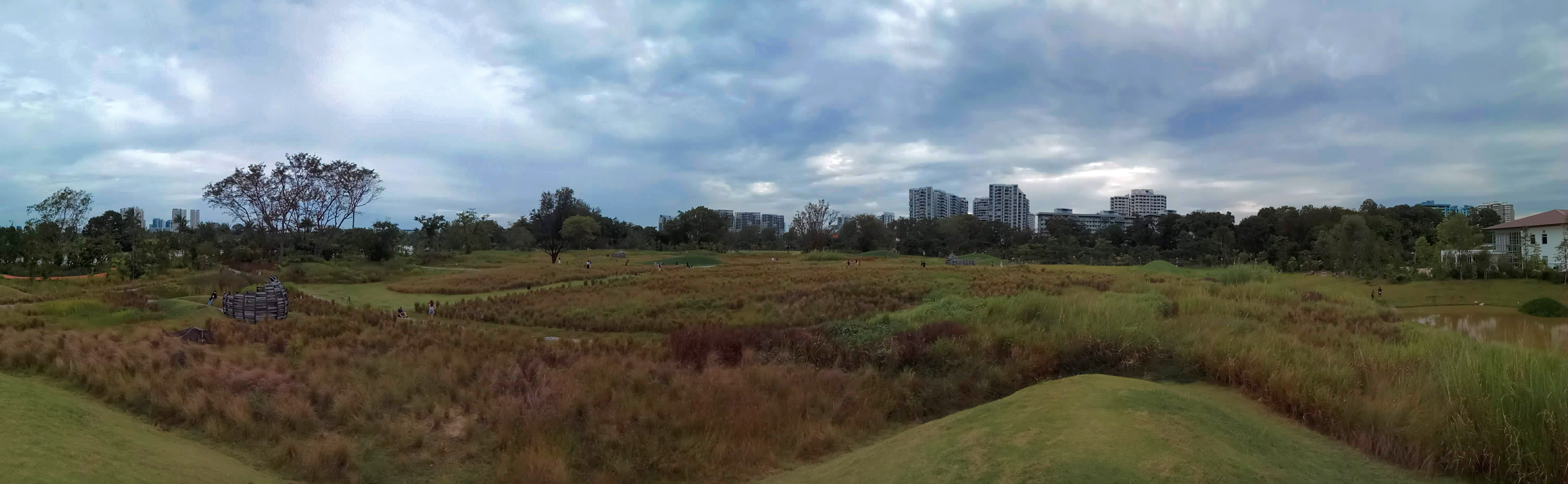
Lallang Field at Jurong Gardens

- Jurong Lake Gardens (Previously separately referred to as Chinese Garden, Japanese Garden, and Jurong Lake Park)

=== Retail ===
- Lakeside Village

=== Transportation ===
- Chinese Garden MRT station
- Lakeside MRT station
- Jurong Lake District MRT station

== Jurong Gateway ==
Located around the Jurong East MRT station, the 70 hectares (700,000 m^{2}) Jurong Gateway will be developed into a commercial hub; the biggest outside the Central Business District.

=== Attraction ===
- Science Centre Singapore (existing site)

=== Business ===
- Vision Exchange
- Perennial Business City

=== Employment agency ===
- Devan Nair Institute for Employment and Employability (opened in 2014)

=== Healthcare ===
- Ng Teng Fong General Hospital (opened in 2015)
- Jurong Community Hospital (opened in 2015)

=== Hospitality ===
- Genting Hotel Jurong

=== Residential ===
- J Gateway
- J'den (Future)

=== Retail ===
- Westgate
- Jem
- J-Link

=== Transportation ===
- Jurong East Bus Interchange
- Jurong East MRT station
- Jurong Gateway Hub (2028)
- Jurong Town Hall Bus Interchange
- Jurong Town Hall MRT station (2028)
- Jurong Lake District MRT station (2032)

== Lakeside Gateway ==
Lakeside Gateway is a 112 hectares (1,120,000 m^{2}) mixed-use business precinct and home to the terminus of the now-cancelled Kuala Lumpur–Singapore high-speed rail project.

On 11 July 2016, the Urban Redevelopment Authority (URA) announced the Request For Proposal (RFP) for Lakeside Gateway.
