= Jurong Lake Gardens =

Park in Jurong East, Singapore

Chinese Garden
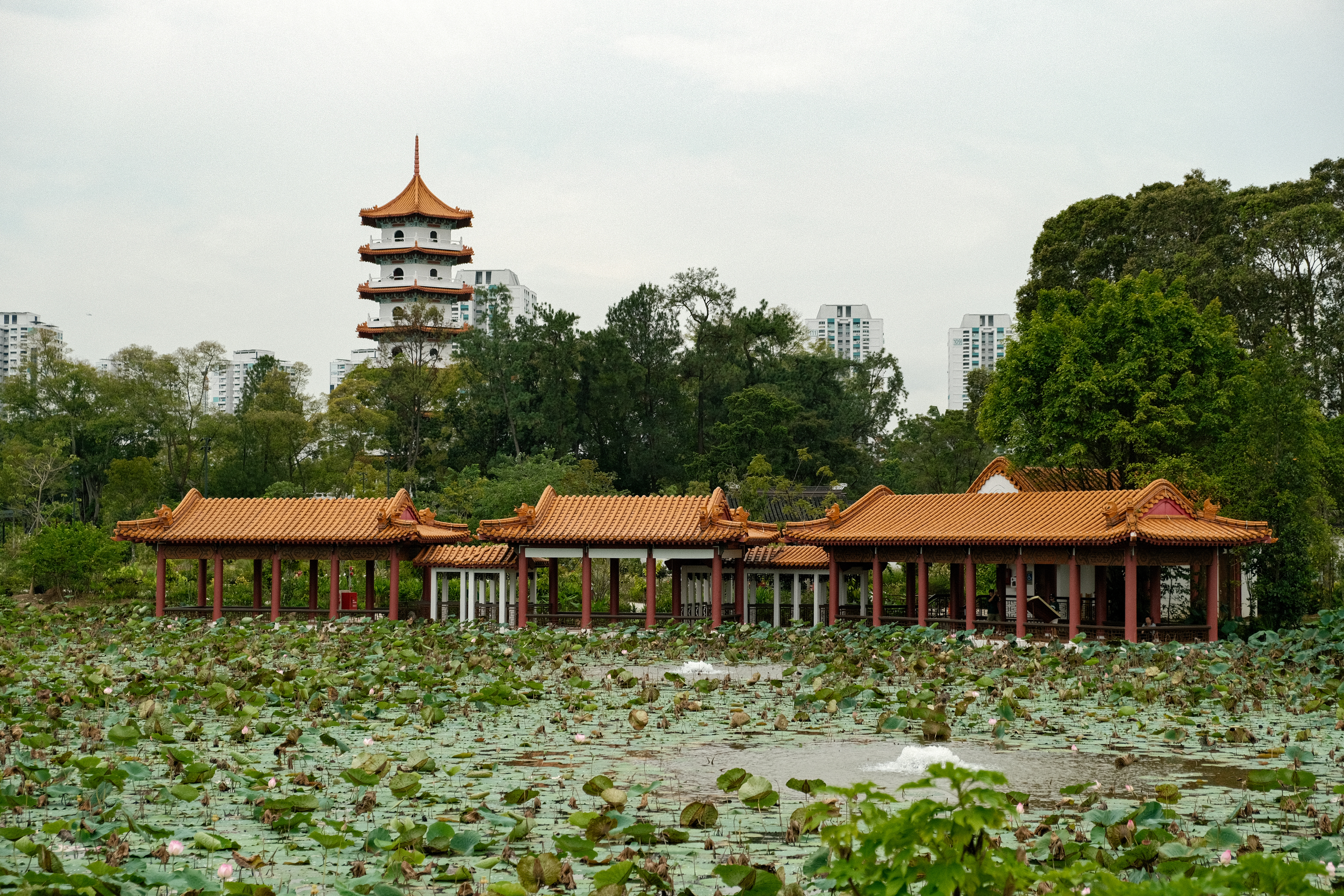
- Chinese Garden in 2025
- Type: Park
- Location: Yuan Ching Road, Jurong East, Singapore
- Coordinates: 1°20′17″N 103°43′42″E
- Area: 13.5 ha (33 acres)
- Opened: 1975; 51 years ago 8 September 2024; 2 years ago (Redevelopment)
- Operator: JTC Corporation
- Open: Opened daily from 5:30am to 12am (SST)
- Public transit: EW25 Chinese Garden (via Chinese Garden Bridge)

Japanese Garden
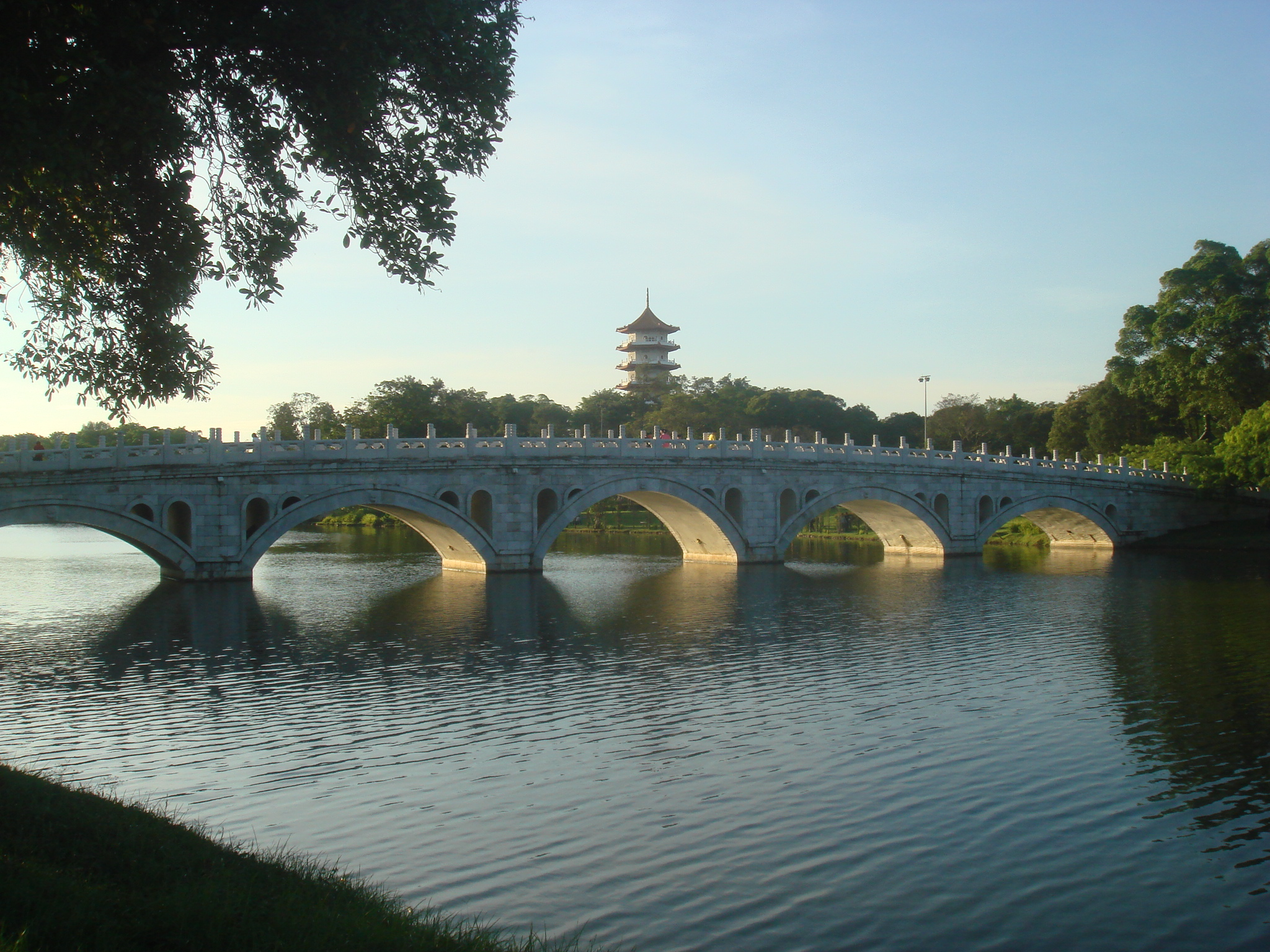
- The bridge connecting the Chinese and Japanese Gardens
- Type: Park
- Location: Jurong East, Singapore
- Area: 13.5 hectares (135,000 m^{2})
- Created: 1974; 52 years ago
- Status: Open daily from 5:30am to 7:00pm (SST)
- Public transit: EW24 NS1 Jurong East (via PCN after Jurong Town Hall Rd)

Lakeside Garden
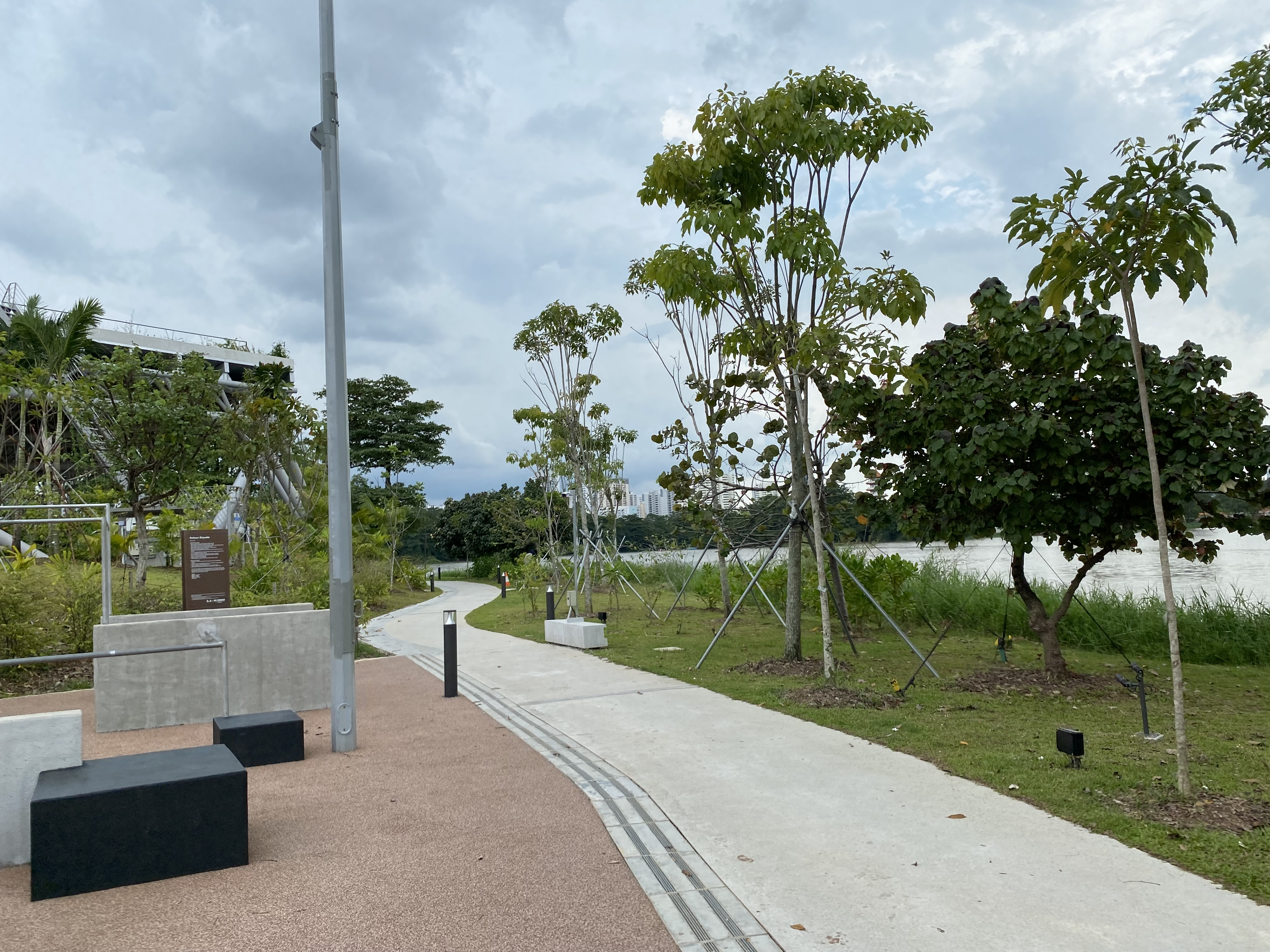
- Lakeside Garden in 2023
- Type: Park
- Location: Jurong East, Singapore
- Area: 60 hectares (150 acres)
- Opened: 27 April 2019; 7 years ago
- Open: Open 24 hours
- Public transit: EW26 Lakeside (via Yuan Ching Rd pedestrian crossing)

Jurong Lake Gardens is the name used to refer to the three interconnected gardens located in and around Jurong Lake in western Singapore, these being the Chinese, Japanese, and Lakeside gardens.

The Jurong Lake Gardens are considered one of Singapore's national gardens, along with Gardens by the Bay and Singapore Botanic Gardens, and, according to the National Parks Board, the first to open in Singapore's heartland.

== History ==
Plans for the construction of the Chinese Garden were first mentioned in 1968 by Woon Wah Siang, the chairman of the JTC Corporation. Earthworks began in 1968, and planning of the design was finalized in 1970, with construction beginning in 1971.

The Japanese Garden (Japanese: 星和園, romanized: Seiwa-en, Chinese: 星和园) was built in 1974 by JTC Corporation.

The garden was completed in 1975 at a cost of S$4.7 million and was opened by then-Finance Minister Hon Sui Sen.

In February 1989, the east entrance was opened, following the opening of Chinese Garden MRT station, to ensure easy access for pedestrians visiting the gardens. The Chinese Garden was later closed from March to July 1989 to undergo renovation work.

In 2014, a year-long "redecoration and refurbishment" project was launched. The areas to be repaired included the main entrance plaza, the pavilions, the pagodas, the Stone Boat, and footpaths. The repair works involved removing wood that had rotted or become infested by termites, patching up spalling concrete and cracked walls, replacing broken and loose roof tiles, stopping water leakage, and replacing old electrical wiring, timber footpaths, and rusted fittings. Then-Prime Minister Lee Hsien Loong floated the idea of integrating the Chinese Garden, the Japanese Garden, and Jurong Lake Park (now referred to as the Lakeside Garden), into a single park, referring to the unified park as Jurong Lake Gardens.

In May 2019, the Chinese Garden and the adjacent Japanese Garden were closed for extensive renovation. The gardens reopened in September 2024 with a new aquatic garden with 150 different types of water lilies. A new exhibit, Sunken Garden, was also introduced, which featured 200 types of epiphytes. Previous features, such as the Twin Pagoda, Grand Arch, and the Stone Boat, were refurbished, while others, such as the main building and courtyards, were demolished.

Phase 1 of the Jurong Lake Gardens, consisting of the Lakeside Garden, opened on 27 April 2019. In 2024, the Chinese and Japanese gardens were reopened to the public after renovations.

== Chinese Garden ==
=== Features ===
A pair of cloudy-grained marble stone lions guard the main gates of the Chinese Garden. The marble stone used to sculpt the lions was imported from Taiwan.

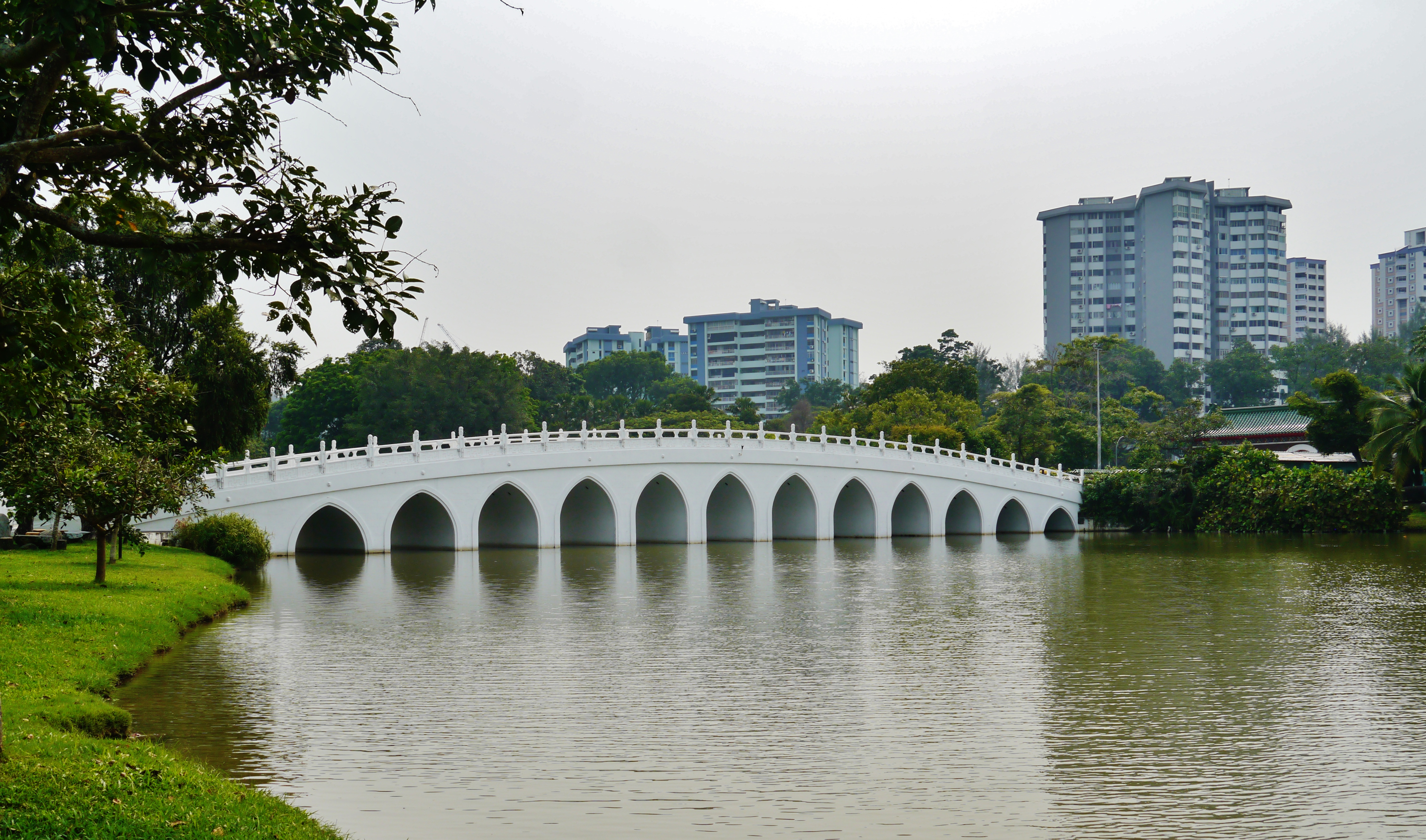
White Rainbow Bridge, connecting the main entrance with the rest of garden

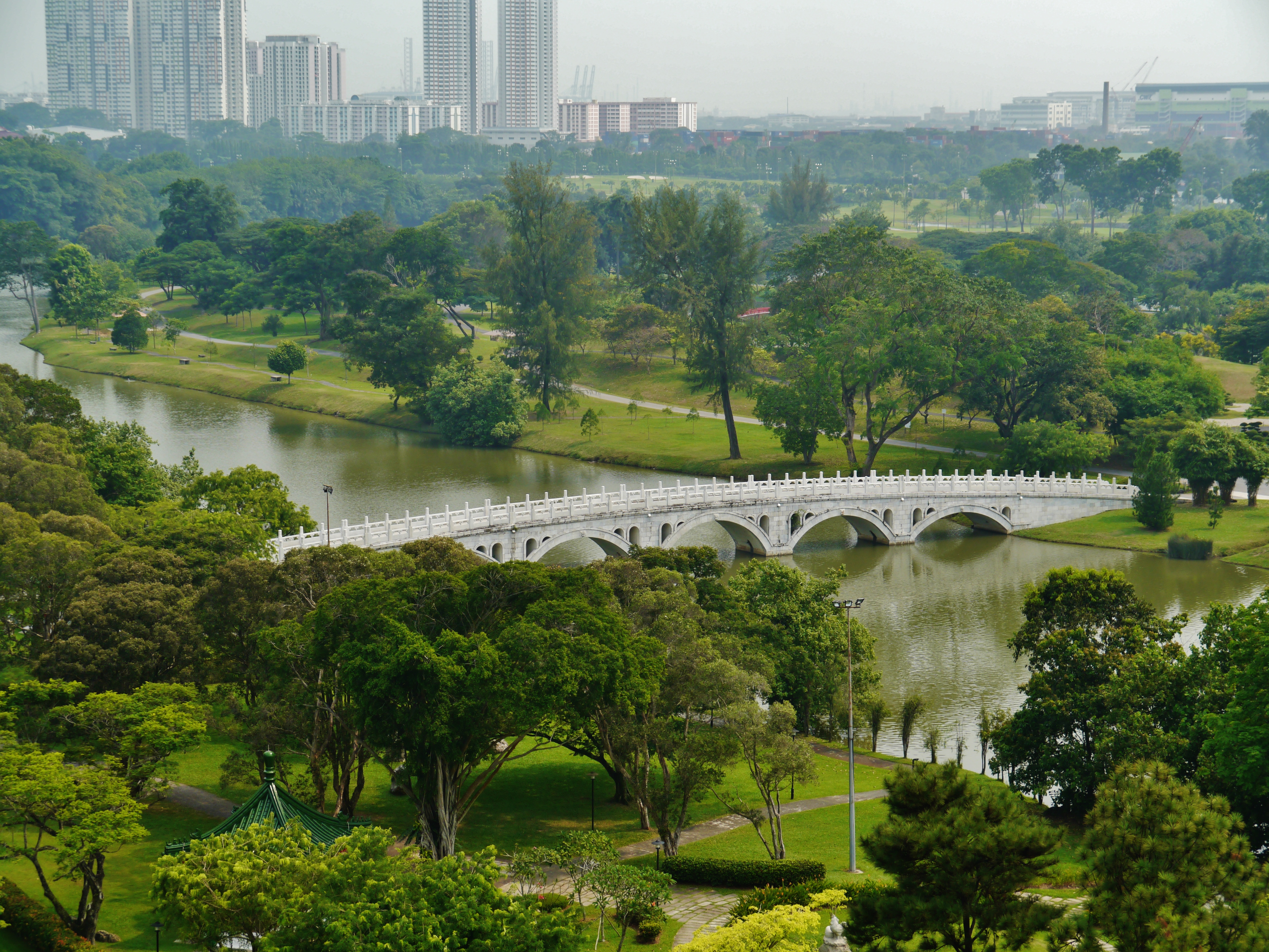
Bridge of Double Beauty, connecting the Chinese Garden to the Japanese Garden

The 13-arch White Rainbow Bridge (Note: (Chinese: 白虹橋, bái hóng qiáo)) at the garden follows the style of the Seventeen-Arch Bridge at the Summer Palace in Peking. In 1989, a second bridge, the Bridge of Double Beauty, was built to connect the Chinese Garden with the Japanese Garden. In the 2024 redevelopment, a third bridge, the Moonrise Bridge, was built, serving as a second connection from the Chinese Garden to the Japanese Garden.

The design of the Stone Boat (Note: (Chinese: 邀月舫, yāo yuè fǎng)) in Chinese Garden incorporates the traditional Peking style, but with some adaptations in the design and usage of materials. The Tea Pavilion (Note: (Chinese: 茗香榭, míng xiāng xiè)) features three pavilions inspired by the style of the elaborate, winding gallery at the Summer Palace. This meandering design is a characteristic Chinese architectural feature.

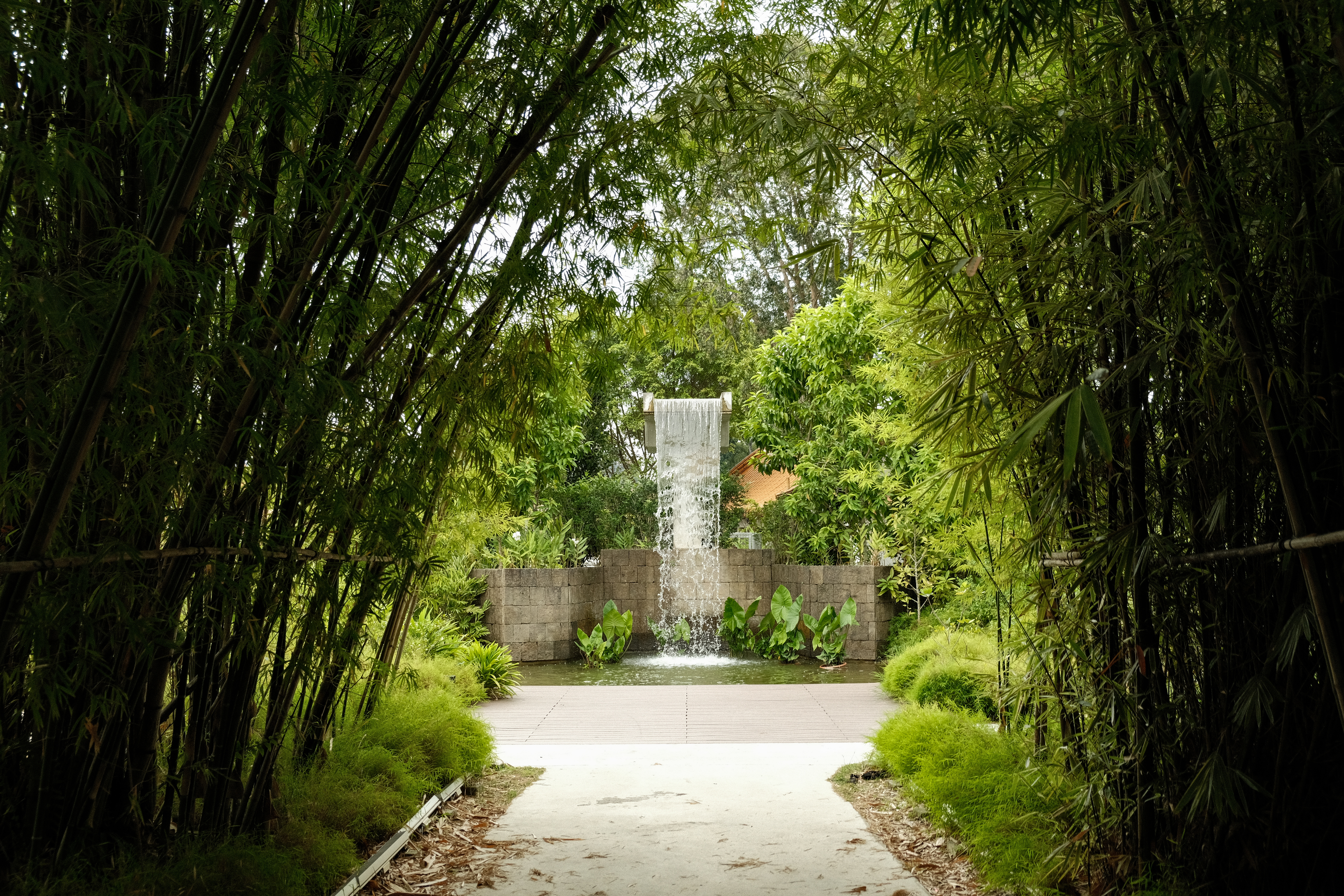
The Bamboo Grove and waterfall

Built in the 2024 redevelopment, the Bamboo Grove pays homage to the rich cultural symbolism of bamboo in traditional Chinese culture, representing moral integrity, resilience, and elegance. The waterfall located within the bamboo grove helps to cool the surrounding area through the wind it generates.

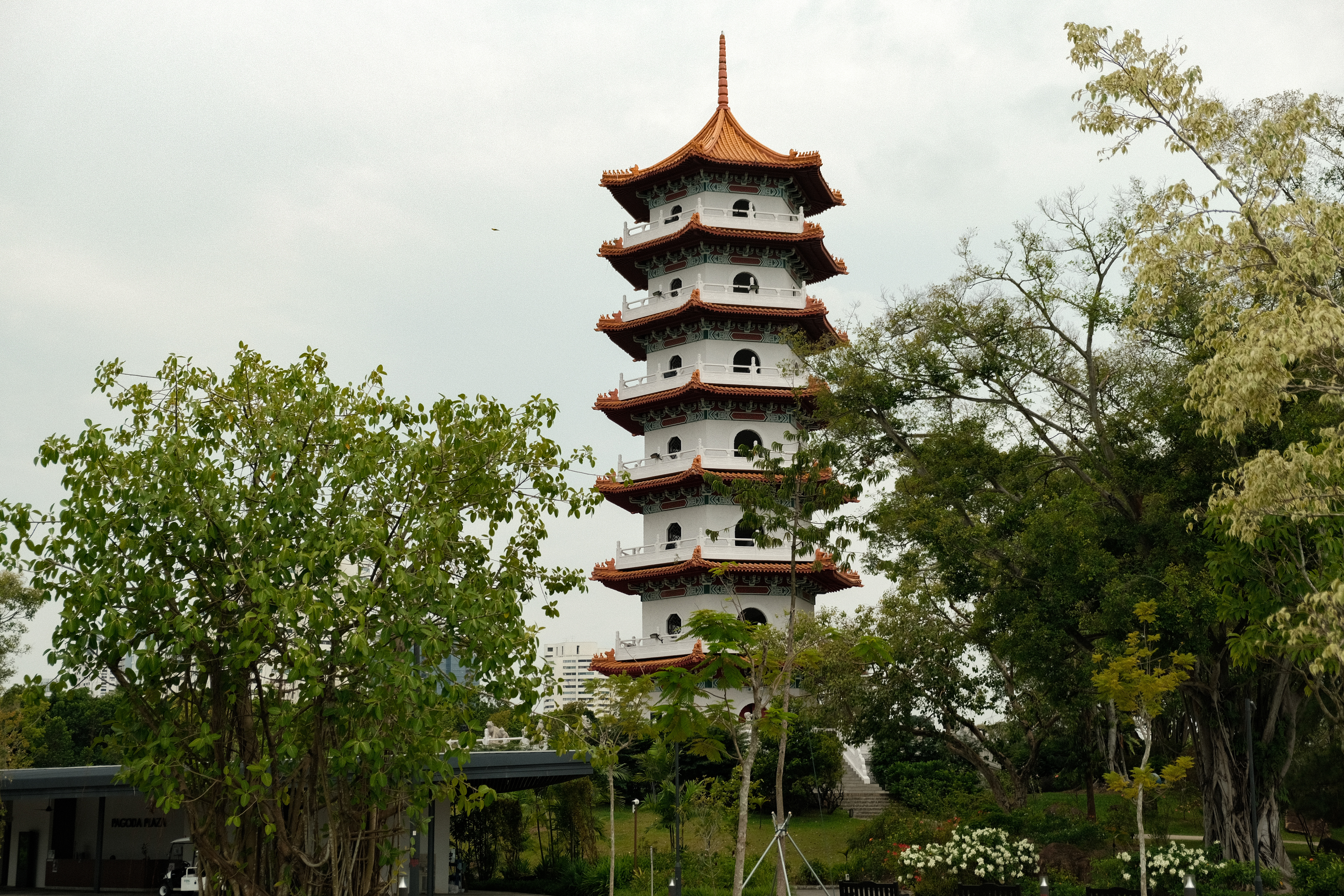
The 7-storey Cloud Pagoda

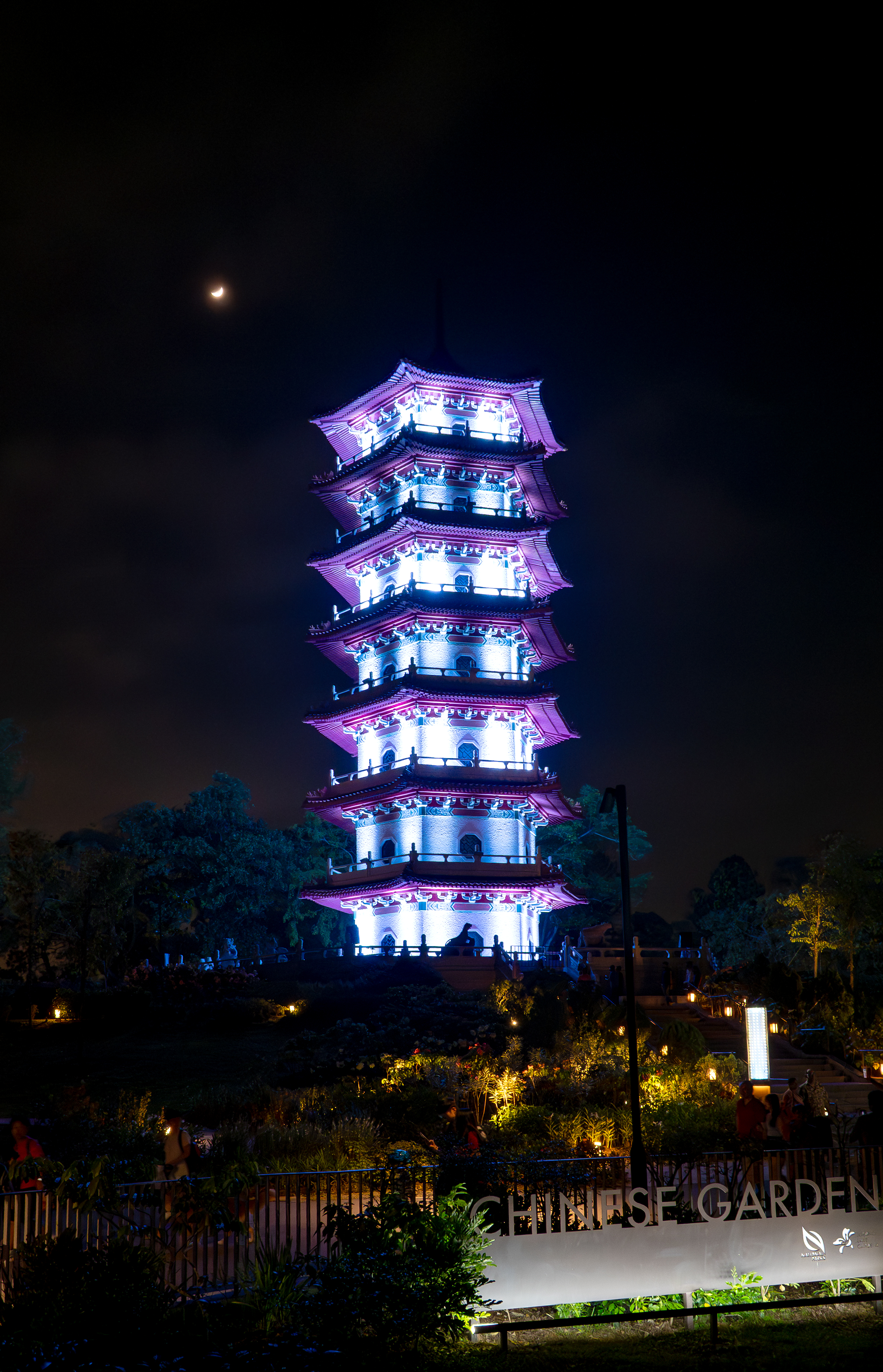
The Cloud Pagoda illuminated during Mid-Autumn Festival 2025

In ancient times, pagodas, originally simple tower structures located beside temples, were used for the storage of human ashes (in urns) by Buddhists. The 7-storey Cloud Pagoda (Note: (Chinese: 入云塔, rù yún tǎ)) is situated on a small hill in the Chinese Garden, known as the Cloud Pagoda Plateau. (Note: (Chinese: 云台揽胜, yún tái lǎn shèng)) Its typical pagoda design follows the style of Linggu Temple Pagoda at Nanjing. The pagoda is surrounded by 12 animal stone sculptures of the Chinese zodiac.

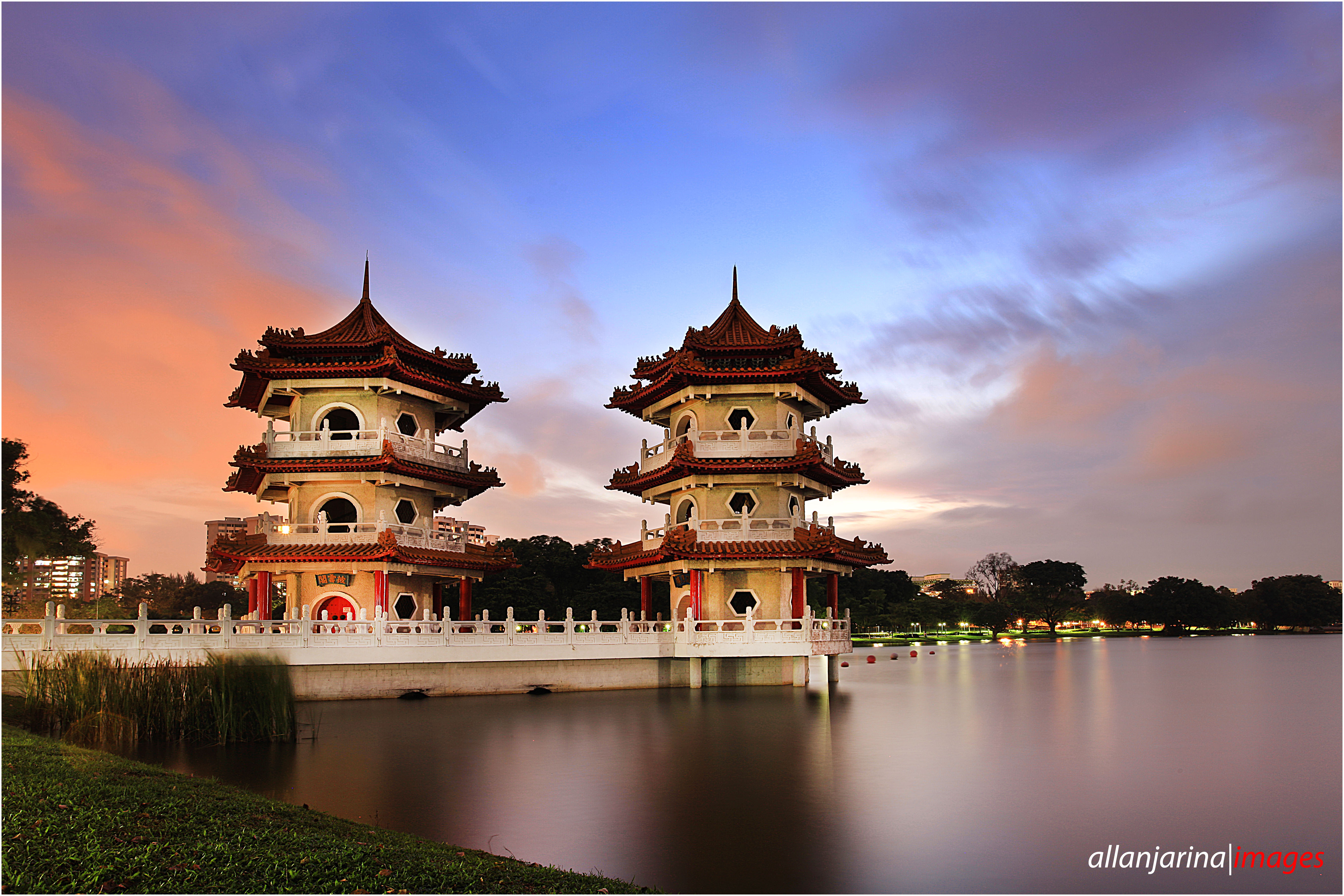
The Twin Pagodas

The Twin Pagodas (Note: (Chinese: 云月双塔, yún yuè shuāng tǎ)) are designed based on the Spring and Autumn Pavilions in Taiwan. They consist of two three-story pagodas, namely the Cloud Draping Tower (Note: (Chinese: 披云阁, pī yún gé)) and the Moon Receiving Tower. (Note: (Chinese: 延月楼, yán yuè lóu)) The designs of the Twin Pagodas embody the yin-yang principle, with the broader tower representing yang and the slender tower representing yin.

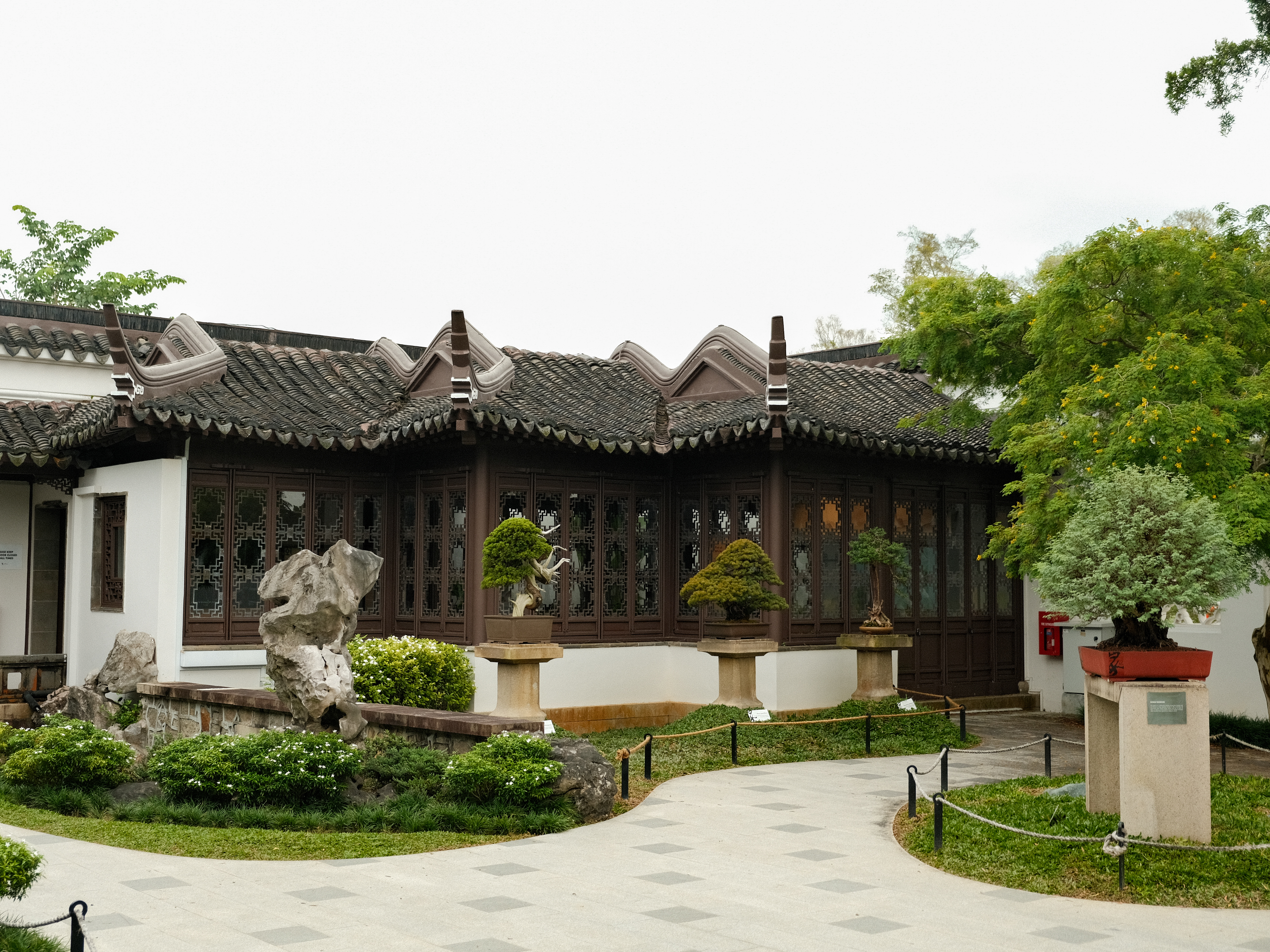
Bonsai Garden

Opened in June 1992, the Bonsai Garden cost an estimated $3.8 million to build. This 5,800-square-metre garden, featuring Suzhou-style buildings (including a main hall of 50 square metres) and landscape houses, showcases a collection of over 2,000 bonsai imported from China and other parts of the world. It is designed as the largest Suzhou-style bonsai garden of its kind outside of China.

Constructed during the 2024 redevelopment, the Water Wall Court features a courtyard and pavilion, surrounded by shallow pools and 3-metre-high water walls.

Replacing the former Garden of Abundance in the 2024 redevelopment, the Cascading Creek is a riverine habitat showcasing Southeast Asian flora and fauna. It features a boardwalk trail with five stages: Fern Cascades, Hill Streams, Kasai Creek, Paperback Swamp, and Nypa Grove.

==== Former Attractions ====
The Live Turtle and Tortoise Museum, a primary attraction in the Chinese Garden, exhibited various species of turtles and tortoises. In 2019, the museum moved out from the gardens and relocated to Yishun; this was due to upgrading works carried out in the surrounding Jurong Lake District. The Chinese-style pavilion that once housed it was subsequently demolished.

The Grand Arch Building was a standard Chinese arch building. Inside, there were two courtyards, namely the Early Spring Courtyard and the Garden Courtyard. Additionally, there was a fishpond in the centre, named the Fish Paradise. The main building within the Grand Arch, together with its courtyards, Chinese-style walls, and moon gates, was demolished in the 2024 redevelopment and replaced with a mass-engineered timber structure. It now houses the Jurong Lake Gardens Gallery and a restaurant.

The original name of this garden was the Zodiac & Pomegranate Garden, derived from the elements used for the construction of the garden. It consisted of pomegranate trees, sculptures of the 12 Chinese Zodiac animals, a sundial, stone bridges, and planting of materials. Hundred-year-old pomegranate trees from Shantung, China, were planted in the garden. They sat among the 12 Chinese Zodiac animal sculptures. The Garden of Abundance was replaced by the Harvest Moon Terrace, Cascading Creek, and Cascade Pavilion in the 2024 redevelopment. The 12 Zodiac animal sculptures were relocated below the Cloud Pagoda.

== Japanese Garden ==
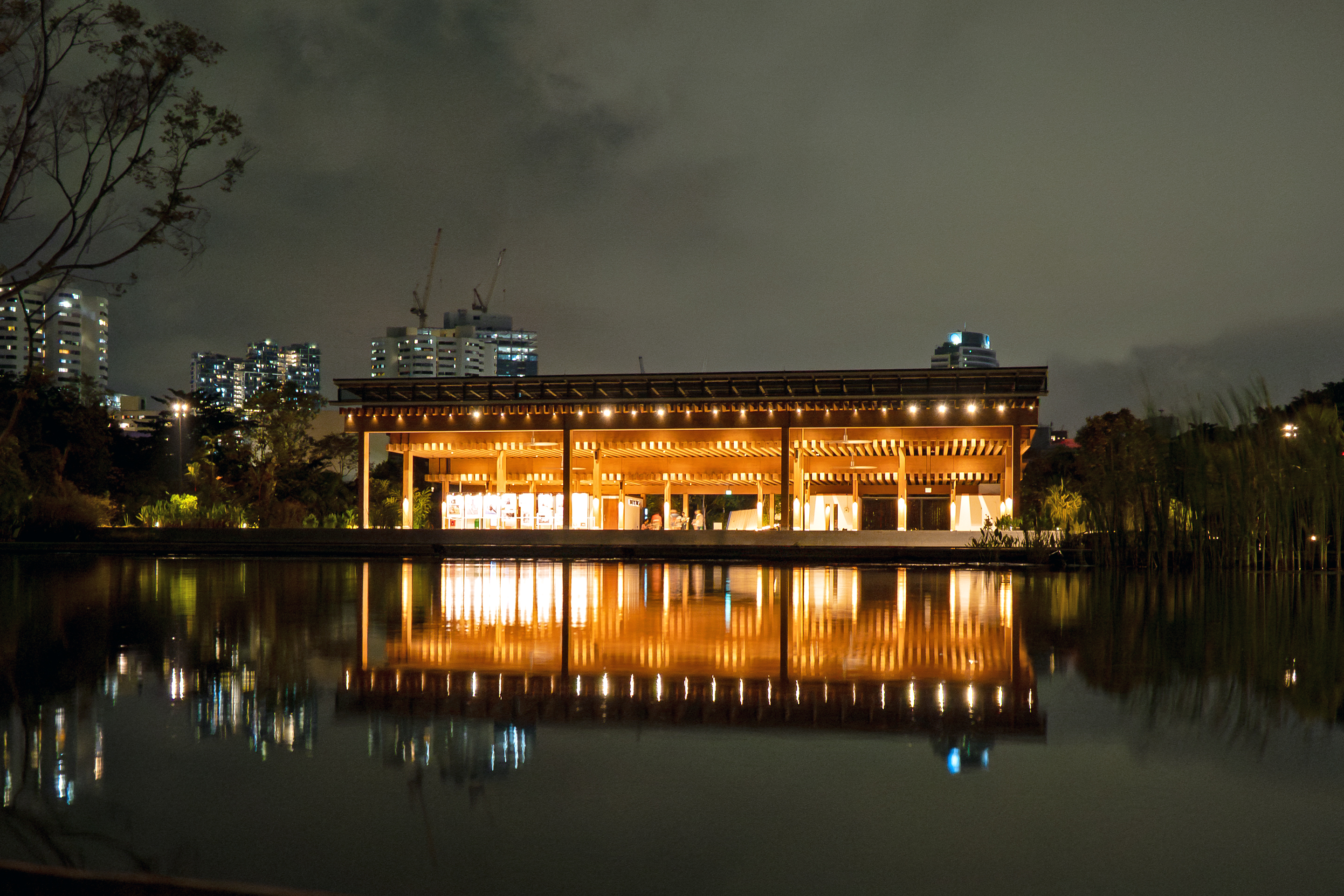
The refreshed Japanese Garden in 2025

Japanese Garden is built on an artificial island in Jurong Lake and is connected to the adjacent Chinese Garden island via the Moonrise Bridge and the Double Beauty Bridge (formerly called the Bridge of Double Beauty). The garden covers 13.5 hectares (135,000 m^{2}) of land.

Along with the neighbouring Chinese Garden, it was extensively remodeled in 2019, and many of its original landscape features and buildings were demolished and replaced. Japanese Gardens was reopened, along with Chinese Garden, on 4th September 2024.

=== Layout and Design ===
Whereas the Chinese Garden is designed to be visually exciting, the Japanese Garden is designed with a calmness to evoke inner peace and a meditative state. The styles and methods used for designing the garden are taken from Japan's Muromachi period of 1392 to 1568 and the Azuchi–Momoyama period of 1568 to 1615.

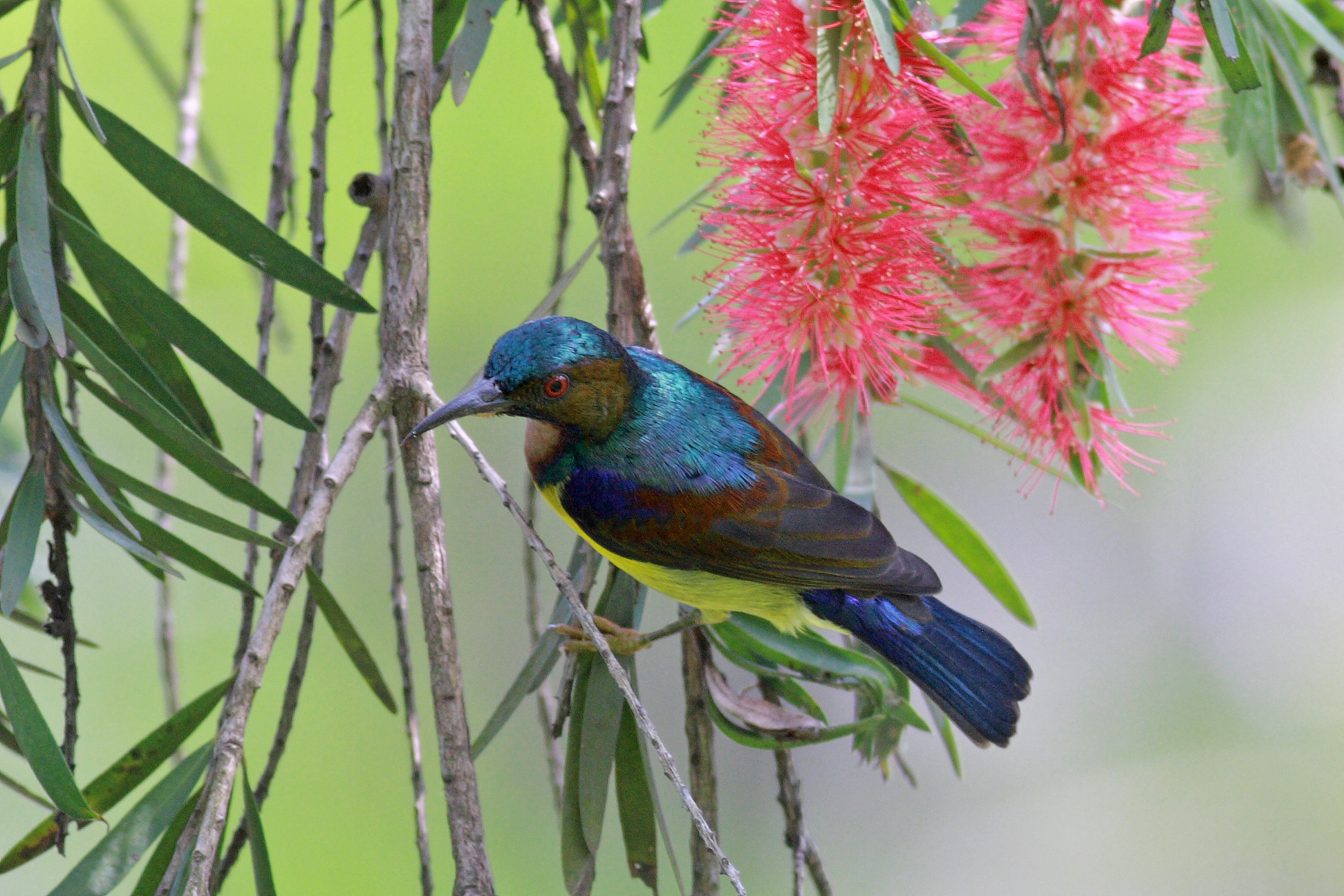
A brown-throated male sunbird visits the Japanese Garden.

With its traditional arched bridges, 10-odd Tōrō stone lanterns, traditional house and rest house, ponds and gravel-chipped pavings, it recreates the traditional Japanese style.

== Lakeside Garden ==
The Lakeside Garden represents the western portion of the Jurong Lake Gardens. Though the Lakeside Garden is open twenty-four hours a day, the following attractions have more limited hours: the ActiveSG Park, Butterfly Maze, Clusia Cove, Dog Run, Forest Ramble (also called the Nature Playground), Passion Wave, and Skatepark.

=== ActiveSG Park ===
ActiveSG operates a number of facilities in its portion of the Lakeside Garden. These facilities include a swimming complex, gyms, sports courts and fields, and areas aimed at children. A number of lessons in various sports may be booked at the facility.

== Interests ==
On the grounds is also one of 10 sundials placed around Singapore to promote the interest in science. The one in the Japanese Garden represents the planet Venus (while the one in the Chinese Garden is for Earth). Large monitor lizards can be seen roaming in the area of the koi-filled ponds.

Events are held in Jurong Lake Gardens to celebrate various cultural festivals such as, but not limited, to Chinese New Year (around January-February) and the Mid-Autumn Festival (around September-October).
