= Chinese Garden MRT station =

Mass Rapid Transit station in Singapore

Chinese Garden EW25 裕华园 சீனத் தோட்டம்
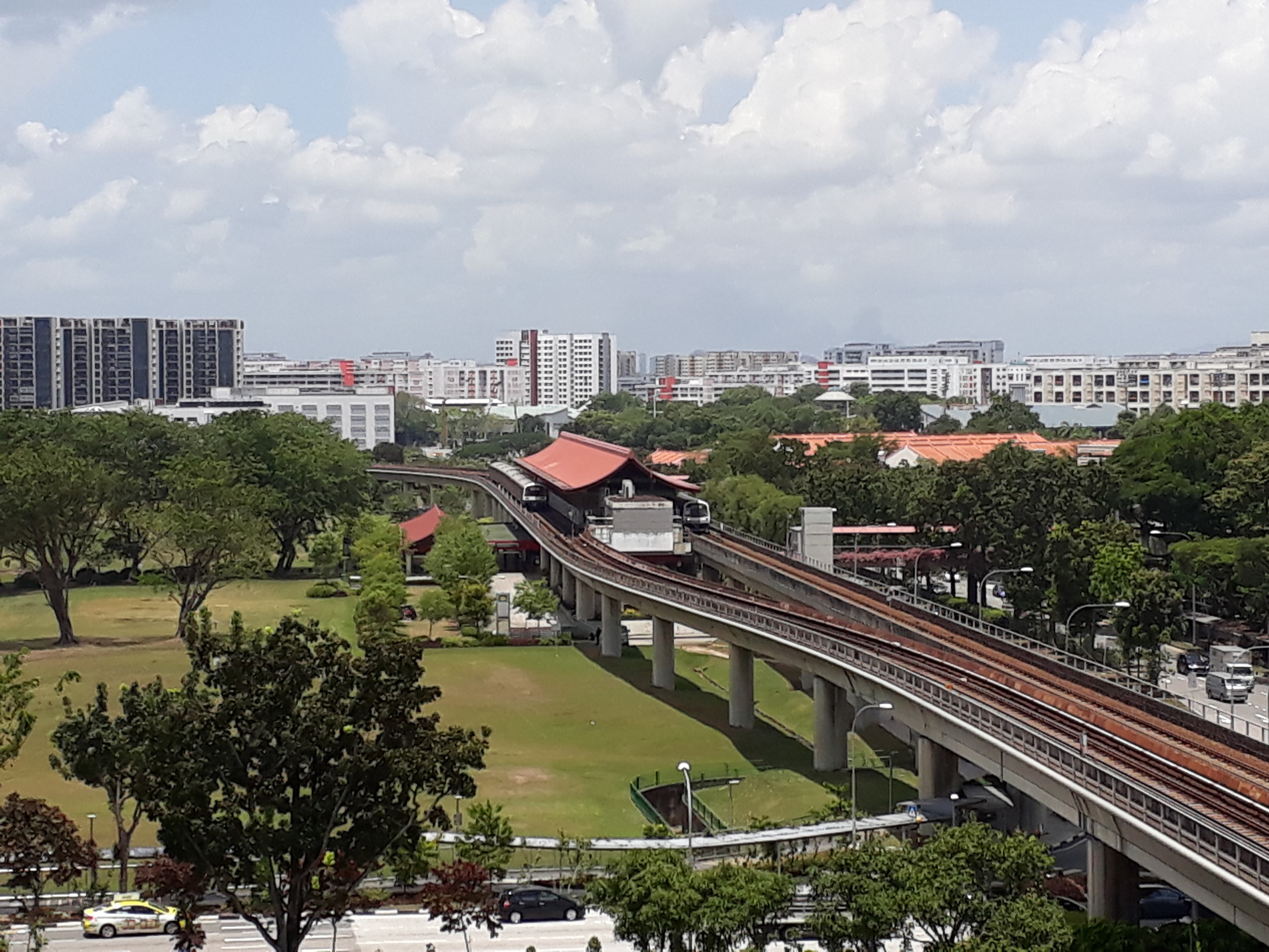
- A bird-eye view of Chinese Garden MRT station

General information
- Location: 151 Boon Lay Way; Singapore 609959
- Coordinates: 1°20′33″N 103°43′57″E
- System: Mass Rapid Transit (MRT) station
- Owner: Land Transport Authority
- Operator: SMRT Trains
- Line: East–West Line
- Platforms: 2 (1 island platform)
- Tracks: 2
- Connections: Bus, Taxi

Construction
- Structure type: Elevated
- Platform levels: 1
- Cycle facilities: Yes
- Accessible: Yes (except for Exit C)
- Architect: Aoki Corporation and Lim Kim Ngah Construction, Parson Brinckerhoff and Maunsell Contracts (roof)
- Architectural style: Chinese (roof)

History
- Opened: 5 November 1988; 37 years ago
- Former names: Jurong Lake

Passengers
- June 2024: 9982 per day

Services
Preceding station	Mass Rapid Transit	Following station
Jurong East towards Pasir Ris	East–West Line	Lakeside towards Tuas Link
Track layout
Location
- Location within Singapore Rail

Chinese Garden MRT station is an elevated Mass Rapid Transit (MRT) station on the East–West Line (EWL) in the Jurong Lake District, Singapore. Operated by SMRT Trains, the station serves the Chinese Garden. Other nearby landmarks include Jurong Primary School and Fuhua Secondary School.

First announced in May 1982 as Jurong Lake, it was to be constructed as part of Phase II of the MRT system. The name was later changed to Chinese Garden in 1984 to better reflect its location. It commenced operations on 5 November 1988 along with the other stations of Phase II. When it opened, the station lacked direct access to Chinese Garden despite being next to it, as well as to the opposite side of the road where most of its commuters lived. Both issues were fixed within a few years. Biking facilities were expanded in July 1990. Accessibility enhancements were completed in July 2011 as well as additional bicycle parking facilities in October 2012. Half-height platform screen doors and high-volume low-speed fans were installed by August 2011 and between 2012 and 2013, respectively.

As a feature of the station, the curved roof supported by decorative red and green beams took inspiration from traditional Chinese architecture. Additionally, there are four paintings created by students from the Yuan Ching Secondary School that feature traditional Chinese cultural icons, which are displayed at the ticketing concourse as part of SMRT's Community Outreach Programme.

== History ==
Chinese Garden station was first included in the early plans of the MRT system as Jurong Lake station in May 1982. It was later announced to be part of Phase II of the MRT in October 1983. On 20 September 1984, the station's name was changed to Chinese Garden station to better reflect its location.

Several single tenderers and joint ventures between companies were prequalified for Contract 404 by May 1985, which detailed the construction of a viaduct from Jurong to Lakeside stations, including Chinese Garden. Ultimately, Contract 404 was awarded to a joint venture between the Aoki Corporation and Lim Kah Ngam Construction for S$64.8 million (US$29.45 million) on 8 November 1985. The subcontract for the supply of post-tension cables and pre-cast beams for the viaducts was awarded to Swiss-Singaporean company VSL Systems in July 1986 while the design of the station's Chinese-style roof was awarded to Parson Brinckerhoff Asia Ltd and Maunsell Consultants on 16 September 1985 as a part of a S$3.6 million (US$1.64 million) contract to give the Phase II MRT stations an "ethnic touch".

External Image
- Artist's impression of Chinese Garden station Source: The Straits Times
- Site map for Chinese Garden Source: The Straits Times

A week before its opening, there was an open house event for the Jurong stretch of the East-West Line (EWL), which included Chinese Garden station. As announced by MRT Corporation chairman Michael Fam on 10 March 1988, Chinese garden station opened on 5 November that year as part of the first portion of Phase II of the MRT system. A primary school band performed inside the station as a part of the opening ceremony.

Upon its opening, the station had a number of issues. Despite its name, the station had no actual direct access to Chinese Garden, forcing commuters to alight at Lakeside station and make their way to Chinese Garden. To solve the problem, the owners of the garden, the Jurong Town Corporation, devised a plan divided into two phases. The first phase is the construction of a 250 metres (270 yd) concrete footpath as well as a temporary timber footbridge and garden entrance. The second phase is the construction of a permanent bridge based on the Sui dynasty An-Chi Bridge as well as an entrance plaza with an area of 1,200 square metres (1,400 sq yd). The first plan was effectuated in February 1989 whilst the second plan was to be implemented by 1991–92. Additionally, there was no actual path to get to the station from the opposite side despite most commuters living there. This caused them to quickly and unsafely cross the road. Even though a S$200,000 (US$99,382.59) overhead bridge was to be built by April of the next year, the lack of thought for pedestrian safety was criticised by some residents and commuters.

In July 1990, it was announced that 10 stations, including Chinese Garden, would have their bicycle stands expanded as part of the cycle-and-ride scheme. In 2008, the LTA announced an accessibility enhancement programme for ten stations, including Chinese Garden. The programme included adding ramps, covered linkways, and taxi stands with wheelchair access. It was completed by July 2011 at a cost of S$116 million (US$92.23 million). Chinese Garden station was part of the first batch of ten stations announced in 2010 to have additional bicycle parking facilities as a response to the growing demand of bicycle parking spots. The installation was completed in October 2012. Following a rise in track intrusions as well as commuters slipping when rushing for the train, the LTA and SMRT decided to install platform screen doors, where it was expected for the works to be completed by 2012. After several tests at different stations, works for the half-height platform screen doors were expected to start in 2010, with eventual installation and operations commencing at Chinese Garden station by August 2011. Between 2012 and 2013, the station was installed with high-volume low-speed fans. A 5.6 kilometres (3.5 mi) cycling path to the station and Lakeside station was opened in October 2021 as a part of a 10 kilometres (6.2 mi) cycling route in Taman Jurong.

== Station details ==
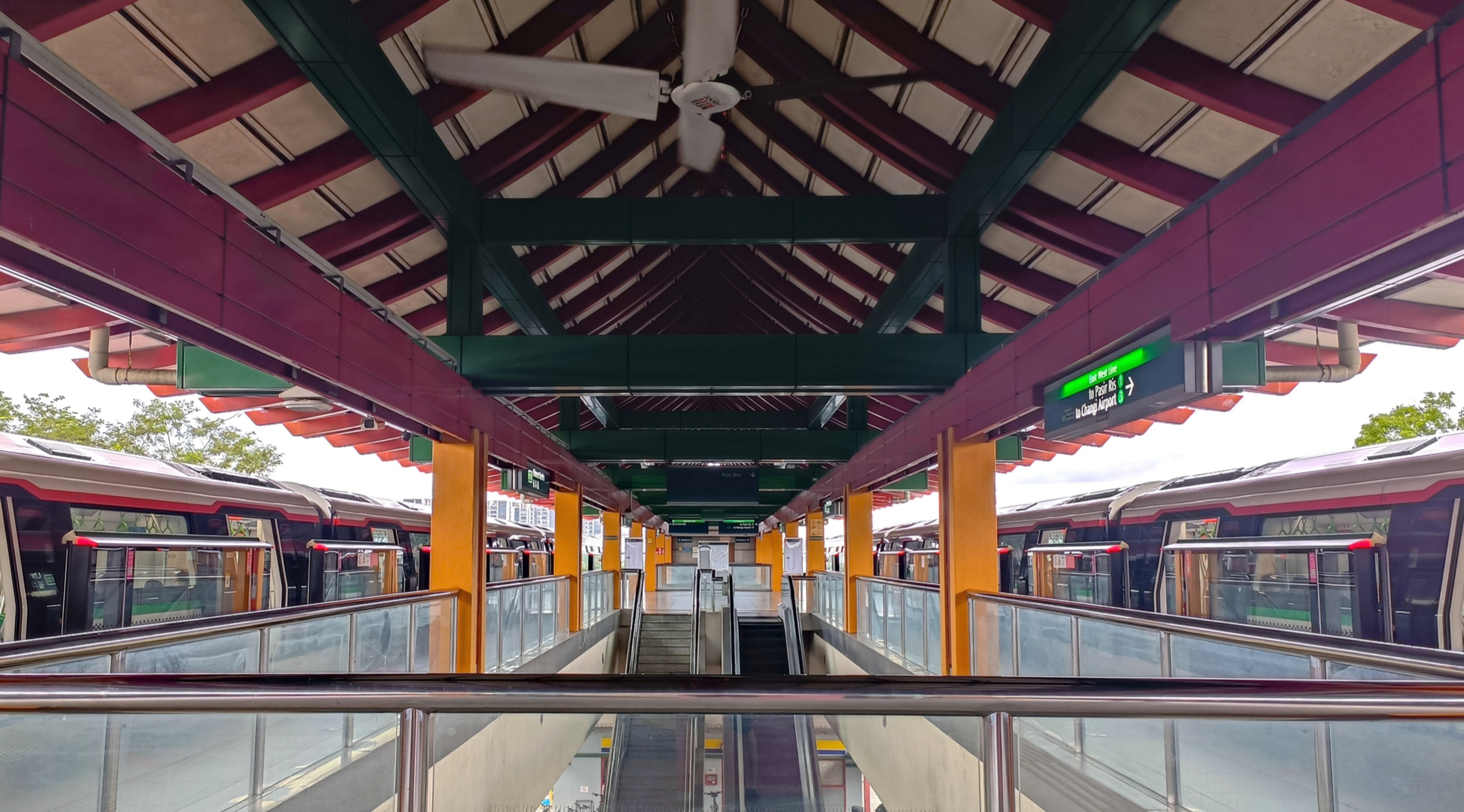
The roof of Chinese Garden station is based on traditional Chinese architectural design.

Chinese Garden station is on the EWL with the station code of EW25, situated between Jurong East and Lakeside station. When it opened, it had the station code of W10 before being changed to its current station code in August 2001 as a part of a system-wide campaign to cater to the expanding MRT System. As a part of the EWL, the station is operated by SMRT Trains. The station operates between 5:16 am and 12:27 am daily. Train frequencies vary from 2.5 to 5.0 minutes. It is wheelchair accessible with the exception of Exit C.

Located in the Jurong Lake District, the station runs alongside Boon Lay Way and is next to Jurong Lake, serving the Chinese Garden along with the Japanese Garden. The station also three exits serving nearby landmarks such as Jurong Primary School, Fuhua Secondary School, Jurong East Sports Centre, and Jurong East neighbourhood police centre.

Like many stations on the initial MRT network, Chinese Garden has an island platform. The station also has a curved roof is based on traditional Chinese architecture. The roof was a part of SMRT's idea to give the stations an "ethnic touch". Specifically, the designer of the station Scott Danielson of Parson Brinckerhoff said that "the more [he traveled], the more disturbed [he became by] architects failing to reflect their own culture" and therefore incorporated a Chinese roof design due to the station's proximity to the Chinese Garden. The decorative beams of the roof have been described as "chili-green and hongbao-red". As part of SMRT's community outreach programme, four paintings created by three Secondary school students from Yuan Ching Secondary School are displayed at the ticketing concourse of the station. These paintings feature a pigeon, goldfish, Chinese porcelain sculpture, and Chinese masks respectively.
