= Shuqun Secondary School =

- 树群中学
- 450 Jurong East Street 21, Singapore 609604

Information
- Type: Government
- Established: 1900
- Session: Single
- Principal: Mr N Sivarajan
- Enrolment: Approx. 500+ (Not accepting new students due to the merger with Yuhua Secondary School in 2019)
- Colours: Yellow, Green and White.
- Website: www.sqss.edu.sg

Shuqun Secondary School (SQSS) was a government secondary school in Jurong East established in 1925. Shuqun Secondary School was moved to Jurong East in 1985 from the old village at former Old Jurong Road. Shuqun Secondary School underwent Programme for Rebuilding and Improving Existing Schools / PRIME in 2009.

== History ==
The school was founded in 1925 as the Tuan Cheng Public School, a Chinese-medium primary school. The school relocated to Jalan Seh Chuan School off Jalan Jurong Kechil in 1933, after which it became the Seh Chuan School. Secondary classes were introduced in 1958 and the school was renamed Seh Chuan High School. It came under government management in April 1983 and the primary classes were split off into the Seh Chuan Primary School in April 1984. The year after, it was renamed the Shuqun Secondary School and it was then relocated to Jurong East Street 21 in June 1986.

There was a school bullying case in Shuqun Secondary School that the issue was not resolved in 22 September 2015. In addition, the principal, Mr N Sivarajan took over the new principal in 2016.

Shuqun Secondary School is one of the schools that will be closed down and merged in 2019. It was merged to Yuhua Secondary School. On 10 April 2026, the Urban Redevelopment Authority announced that the school's former premises would be redeveloped into Housing and Development Board blocks and condominiums.
