= Lakeside MRT station =

Mass Rapid Transit station in Singapore

Lakeside EW26 湖畔 லேக்சைட்
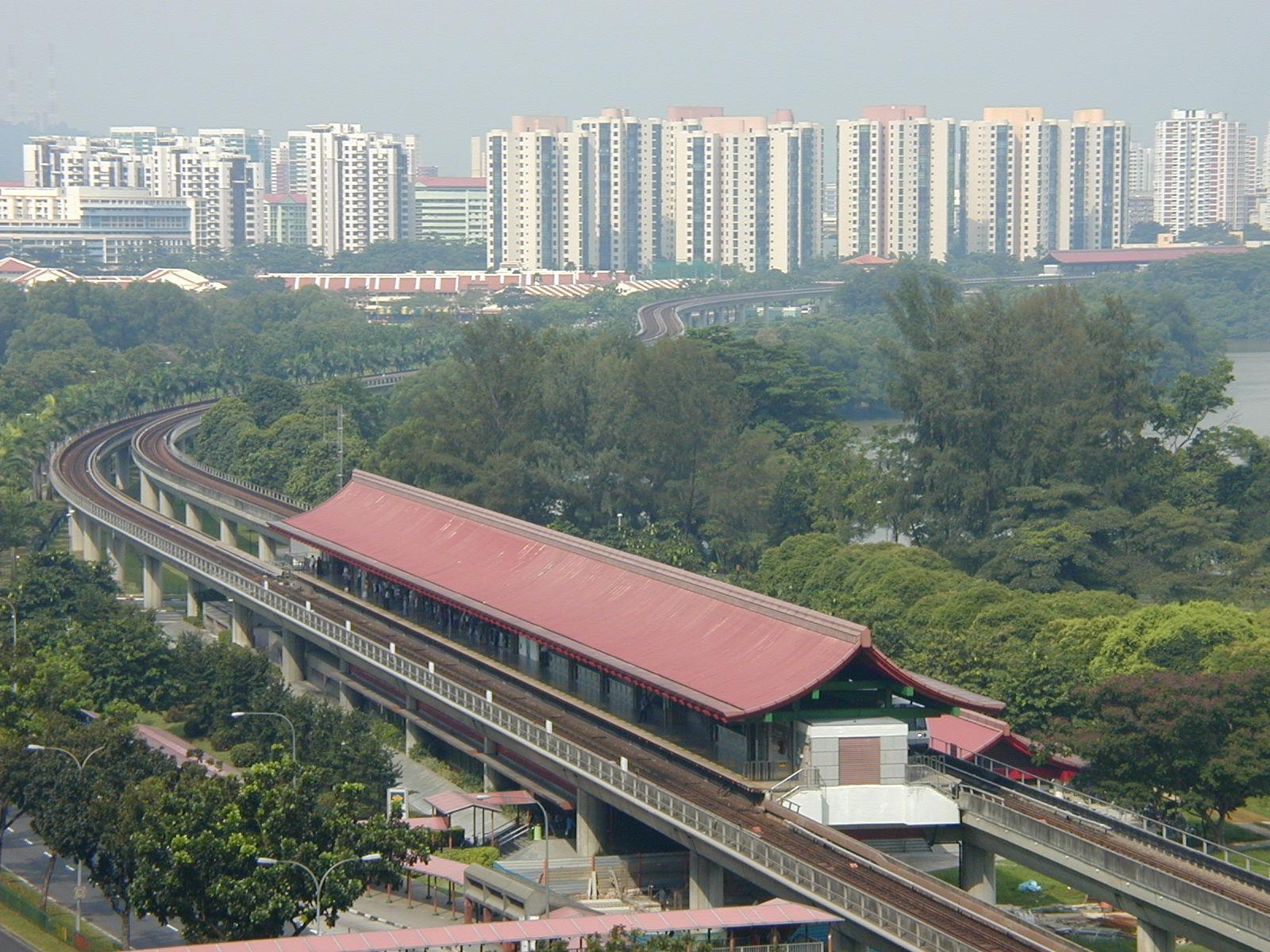
- Exterior of Lakeside MRT station, which is adjacent to Jurong Lake in the background.

General information
- Location: 201 Boon Lay Way; Singapore 649845
- Coordinates: 1°20′40.52″N 103°43′16.10″E
- System: Mass Rapid Transit (MRT) station
- Owner: Land Transport Authority (LTA)
- Operator: SMRT Trains Ltd (SMRT Corporation)
- Line: East–West Line
- Platforms: 2 (1 island platform)
- Tracks: 2
- Connections: Bus, Taxi

Construction
- Structure type: Elevated
- Platform levels: 1
- Cycle facilities: Yes
- Accessible: Yes
- Architect: Aoki Corporation and Lim Kim Ngah Construction, Parson Brinckerhoff and Maunsell Contracts (roof)
- Architectural style: Chinese (roof)

History
- Opened: 5 November 1988; 38 years ago
- Former names: Corporation

Passengers
- June 2024: 31,288 per day

Services
Preceding station	Mass Rapid Transit	Following station
Chinese Garden towards Pasir Ris	East–West Line	Boon Lay towards Tuas Link
Track layout
Location
- Location within Singapore Rail

Lakeside MRT station is an elevated Mass Rapid Transit (MRT) station on the East–West Line in Jurong West, Singapore. Operated by SMRT Trains, the station serves the eponymous Jurong Lake and the Hong Kah and Taman Jurong residential estate. Other nearby landmarks include Yuan Ching Secondary School and the Jurong West Branch of the Housing and Development Board.

First announced in May 1982 as Corporation, it was to be constructed as part of Phase II of the MRT system. The name was later changed in 1984 to better reflect its location adjacent to Jurong Lake. It commenced operations on 5 November 1988 along with the other stations of Phase II. By July 1990, it had its bicycle facilities expanded, with additional biking facilities installed in 2012. Platform screen doors were also completed in 2012, with noise barriers installed on viaducts in 2018.

As a feature of the station, the curved roof supported by decorative red and green beams took inspiration from traditional Chinese architecture. There is also a heritage-themed mural that displays the history of nearby landmarks.

== History ==
The station was first announced in October 1983 to be part of Phase II of the MRT system as Corporation station. However, in September 1984, it was renamed to Lakeside to tentatively reflect its location better.

Several joint ventures between companies were prequalified for Contract 404 by May 1985, which detailed the construction of a viaduct from Jurong to Lakeside stations, including Lakeside. Ultimately, the contract was awarded to a joint venture between the Aoki Corporation and Lim Kim Ngah Construction for $64.75 million in November 1985 while the subcontract for the supply of post-tension cables and pre-cast beams during the construction of the viaducts was awarded to Swiss-Singaporean company VSL Systems in July 1986. The contract for the design of the station's Chinese-style roof was awarded to Parson Brinckerhoff Asia Ltd and Maunsell Consultants in September 1985 as a part of a $3.6 million contract to give the Phase II MRT stations an "ethnic touch". A week before the opening, there was an open house event for the Jurong stretch of the EWL, which included Lakeside station. The station was opened on 5 November 1988 as part of the first portion of Phase II of the MRT system. A primary school band performed in the station as a part of the opening ceremony.

After its opening, there was an issue with the station; the lack of an orderly taxi system. It was reported that many commuters would engage in queue-cutting as well as taxis haphazardly stopping in the middle of the road to pick up commuters and motorists picking up/dropping off people at the station's entrance despite there being a designated pick-up point at Yuan Ching Road. The issue was promptly fixed by relocating the taxi stand from Yuan Ching Road to the main entrance of the station in June 1990. By July, Lakeside, along with two other stations, had its bicycle facilities expanded as part of the Cycle-and-ride scheme.

Lakeside station was the first batch of ten stations announced in 2010 to have additional bicycle parking facilities as a response to the growing demand of bicycle parking spots. The installation was completed in October 2012. As with most of the above-ground stations built in the past along the East–West Line, it was built without platform screen doors. ollowing a rise in track intrusions as well as commuters slipping when rushing for the train, the LTA and SMRT decided to install platform screen doors, where it was expected for the works to be completed by 2012. Contract C1320 for the design and installation of half-height platform screen doors was awarded to Singapore Technologies Electronics Limited in September 2008 for S$112.3 million (2008) (US$79.37 million). After several tests at Jurong East, Yishun and Pasir Ris stations, works for the half-height platform screen doors were expected to start in 2010, with eventual installation and operations commencing at Chinese Garden station by August 2011. High-volume low-speed fans were installed and commenced operation by the first quarter of 2013. Noise barriers were installed on the viaducts from Lakeside MRT station to Corporation Road by CKT Thomas Pte Ltd as part of $17 million contract awarded in January 2015 to reduce sounds generated by trains. It was installed by 2018. A 5.6 kilometres (3.5 mi) cycling path connecting to this station was opened in October 2021 as a part of a 10 kilometres (6.2 mi) cycling route in Taman Jurong.

== Station details ==
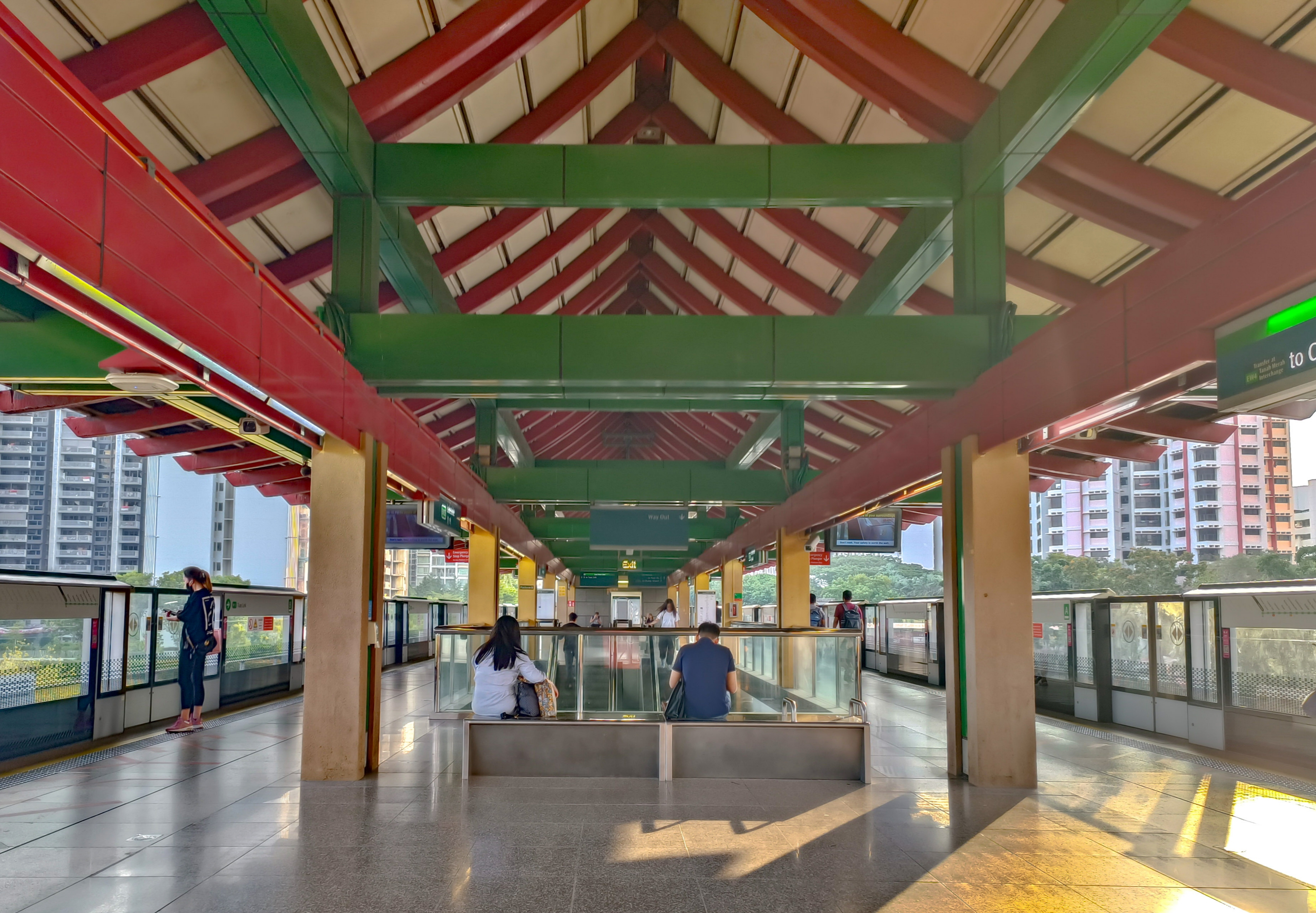
The roof of Lakeside station

Lakeside station is on the EWL with the station code EW26, between Chinese Garden and Boon Lay stations. When it opened, it had the station code of W11 before being changed to its current station code in August 2001 as a part of a system-wide campaign to cater to the expanding MRT System. As a part of the EWL, the station is operated by SMRT Trains. The station operates between 5:18 am and 12:29 am daily. Train frequencies vary from 2.5 to 5.0 minutes.

The station runs alongside Boon Lay Way and has three exits primarily serving the Hong Kah and Taman Jurong residential precincts. It also serves amenities such as Yuan Ching Secondary school, HDB Jurong West Branch, and Hong Kah South Neighborhood Police Post (NPP).

Like many stations on the initial MRT network, Lakeside has an island platform. A feature of the station, the curved roof is based on traditional Chinese architecture. The roof was a part of SMRT's idea to give the stations an "ethnic touch". Specifically, the designer of the station Scott Danielson of Parson Brinckerhoff said that "the more [he traveled], the more disturbed [he became by] architects failing to reflect their own culture" and therefore incorporated a Chinese roof design due to the station's proximity to the Chinese Garden. The design is noted to be similar to the nearby Chinese Garden station, whose roof is held by "chili-green and hongbao-red" decorative beams. Additionally, there is also a mural created by local artist Anthony Chong as a part of SMRT's heritage-themed Comic Connect. The mural displays the history of different landmarks such as Jurong Lake, Old Jurong Fire Station, and the former Taman Jurong Camp, now Taman Jurong Green, was where Singapore's first batch of national servicemen were enlisted.
