= Yuhua Secondary School =

Co-educational government school in Jurong West, Singapore

- 裕华中学; Sekolah Menengah Yuhua

Location
- 35 Jurong West Street 41 Singapore 649406; Singapore; 1.3473°N 103.7224°E

Information
- School type: Government, co-educational
- Motto: Above All, Care
- Opened: 1986
- Session: Single Session
- School code: 3019
- Principal: Tang Tsin Wei
- Color: Maroon Green Navy Blue
- Website: yuhuasec.moe.edu.sg

Yuhua Secondary School (YHSS) is a co-educational government school in Jurong West, Singapore which offers the Express, Normal (Academic) and Normal (Technical) streams. It was founded in 1986.

== History ==
The school began operations in 1986. In the 1990s, the school was well known for its hockey team.

From 2013 to 2014, the school was upgraded under the Programme for Rebuilding and Improving Existing Schools scheme. Under the upgrade, an auditorium, barrier-free access and an indoor sports hall were added. It absorbed Shuqun Secondary School in 2019.

== Identity and culture ==
=== School Crest ===
The school crest of Yuhua Secondary consists of a letter Y and a letter H interweaved together, representing the strength in unity and effort exemplified by the school in pursuing excellence. The letters are made out of broad and narrow lines, signifying the many paths students of the school can take to achieve success.

=== School's Concert Band ===
Yuhua Secondary School concert band is a CCA which has been a strong stay of the school since the 1980s. The concert band has also participated in the 2018, 2023 and 2025 National Day Parade.

== Curriculum ==
The school offers three academic streams to its students – the Express, Normal (Academic) and Normal (Technical) courses. The Express course consists of a four-year scheme preceding the Singapore-Cambridge GCE Ordinary Level examinations, while both the Normal (Academic) and Normal (Technical) streams consist of a scheme over the same duration that culminates in the Singapore-Cambridge GCE Normal Level examination. Those in the Normal (Academic) course also have the option to continue one more year to the GCE Ordinary Level examination after completing their GCE Normal Level examinations.

The school also offers a music programme known as Music Empowered Learners, Our Dynamic Yuhuans (MELODY). According to the school, this programme allows students to delve into different forms of music, as well as to show off their musical skills. Since 2016, the school has also offered the Enhanced Music Programme to its students and also Electronics as a new O Level Subject. There are also addition of new subjects for N Level students.

== Co-curricular activities ==
Yuhua Secondary offers a total of 18 extra-curricular activities (−1 after merger), labelled as co-curricular activities (CCAs) by the Ministry of Education. These include sports, performing arts, clubs as well as uniformed groups. Several of these have managed to perform well for their school over the years.

The school's concert band has been awarded Certificates of Distinction for the Singapore Youth Festival ever since the method of judging was changed to the Arts Presentation Assessment in 2012. The school's Chinese dance troupe has also attained Certificates of Distinction and Accomplishment over the same period of time.

Uniformed Groups: National Cadet Corps (NCC), National Police Cadet Corps (NPCC), National Civil Defence Cadet Corps (NCDCC), Boys Brigade

Sports: Tchoukball, Volleyball, Floorball, Football, Wushu.

Performing Arts: Choir, Dance, Concert Band, Stagewright, Harmonica Band

Clubs and Societies: Media Resource Library, Tinkering and Robotics Club, Inforcomm and Media Club.
