= Vernon Palmer =

Singaporean radio and television personality

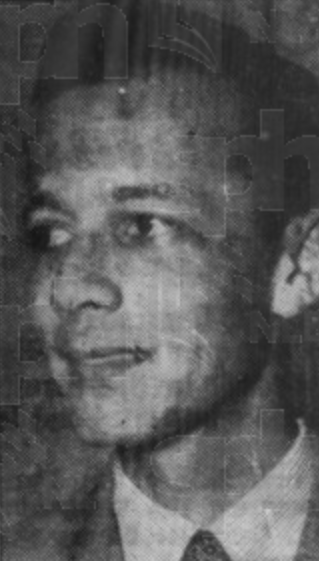
Palmer in 1952.

Vernon Cyril Palmer (14 April 1925 – 20 November 2009) was a Singaporean radio and television personality, best known for his Radio Malaya, then Radio Singapore, then Radio Malaysia (Singapura), then again Radio Singapore programmes in the 1950s and the 1960s. Nicknamed "Mr. Radio", he spent 36 years in radio, initially as a technician and later as a producer and broadcaster. He then served as the Controller of Television from 1966 to 1972, when he became the Controller of Programme Administration. In 1979, he was made the Senior Controller of Programme Administration, then a newly-created role. He then became the assistant director of training before officially retiring in 1982.

== Early life and education ==
Vernon Cyril Palmer was born in Singapore on 14 April 1925. A Eurasian, he was of Scottish and Siamese descent on his father's side and German and Burmese descent on his mother's. His father was an accountant and later assistant manager with Shell who was stationed on Pulau Bukom, where the family lived. Palmer received his education at the Saint Andrew's School, which was located on the mainland. As such, he would commute by ferry in the morning and the evening before he went to live with his grandmother along Newton Road at the age of 14. He began reading books on radio engineering in his youth, though his father wished him to be a lawyer while his mother wanted him to become a doctor. In 1932, his father bought a pilot radio set, which served as his "first introduction" to radio. His father gained an interest in radio and "passed on this interest to [Palmer]." Following the founding of the British Malaya Broadcasting Corporation in 1935, he began building his own crystal radio sets.

=== World War II ===
When the Japanese began bombing Singapore, Palmer's mother and sister left Pulau Bukom and moved in with him, his grandmother and his aunt, while his father, a captain with the Local Defense Corps, was not yet allowed to evacuate. The family built an air raid shelter, where they had begun sleeping, and prepared travel documents to evacuate overseas. However, on 9 February 1942, his house was bombed, "badly" injuring him and killing both his mother and his aunt. After this, the plans for an evacuation fell through and Singapore fell to the Japanese a few days later, kickstarting the Japanese occupation. His father then came to live with them, the corps having been disbanded. As Palmer and his family were Eurasians, they were ordered to assemble on the Padang where it would be determined if they would be sent to Changi Prison. They were declared "non-subversive" and returned home. In the months that followed, their house was looted by the Japanese of anything "movable" and they continued to sleep in the air raid shelter. What remained they eventually sold. During this period, he would visit a neighbour who was an engineer, and who would lecture him and give him books on engineering.

Eventually, as the family was running low on food and money, Palmer and his father decided to farm tapioca on a plot of land they had owned on Flower Road in Serangoon. Some of the tapioca was kept to feed the family while the rest was sold for money to buy food and medicine. However, after a Japanese officer had attacked Palmer while he was on his way back from the farm, his father decided to cease farming as it was getting "too dangerous". His father was then hired as an accountant at a noodle factory established by a friend of his. This allowed the family to afford vegetables. In 1944, Palmer himself began working as a truck driver at the former Archipelago Brewery on Alexandra Road, which had been repurposed by the Japanese as a Kirin brewery, having received the job offer from another friend of his father. However, while on the job, he was stopped by a Japanese officer who gave him a beating which resulted in his hospitalisation. The brewery then moved him to the workshop. After telling the brewery's engineer that he was familiar with electrical engineering, Palmer was made an electrician, which came with an increased salary.

== Career ==
=== Technician ===
After the end of the occupation, Palmer was "stoney broke". Unable to afford college, he began job seeking. By then, his father had decided to allow him to decide on what he wished to pursue as a career. As Radio Malaya was hiring, he applied for a job there. A month later the British returned, Palmer was hired as a technician in the Outside Broadcast Unit of Radio Malaya, working in the basement of the Cathay Building. His father was also rehired as an assistant manager at Shell on Pulau Bukom. This came with both advance and back pay, which allowed the family to refurnish the house. His first assignment was to aid in the installation of microphone and public address systems at the Padang for the official Japanese surrender and the ensuing parade. As a technician, Lord Mountbatten, who oversaw the recapture of Singapore, would often get Colonel John Dumeresque, then Director of Broadcasting, to contact Palmer such that a playback of the former's speeches could be arranged for. Eventually, Mountbatten, fearing that he was "taking too much" of Dumeresque's time, asked for Palmer's contact and from then on his aide-de-camp would directly ask Palmer when Mountbatten wished to arrange for a playback of his speeches.

In 1946, Palmer was among the Radio Malaya employees who were sent on a tour to parts of the Malay Peninsula which had not properly received the radio transmissions announcing the end of the war, with the Communist underground, led by Chin Peng, remaining active. They were to broadcast and establish halls to announce to the residents of these areas that the Japanese had surrendered. He later claimed to have been fired at by some of the Communist forces who had yet to be informed, as well as to have shaken the hand of Chin Peng after revealing to him that the war had ended. In this period, as part of the Outside Broadcasting Unit, he was involved in recording performances and events in external venues such as concerts by Larry Adler. He produced a Benny Goodman Orchestra concert at the Singapore Badminton Hall. On one day in this period, he was the engineer on duty during the production of a Sunday drama when assistant producer Joan Yorke, who was in charge of special effects and music, fell ill and had to be hospitalised. Producer Adza Vincent then got him to take over Yorke's position, guiding him in the process. After this, Dumeresque offered to give him a job as what was then tentatively titled "music library assistant" and asked him to help establish a Programme Engineering Department for the station, which was "badly needed".

=== Producer and broadcaster ===
Palmer accepted Dumeresque's offer, after which he was transferred to the Programmes Division where he established a Special Effects Library. In January 1949, following a listeners' survey from the station which showed the people were more interested in "request programmes, dance and Hawaiian music and variety shows employing local talent", the station announced that it would be hosting a local talent competition. Palmer was involved in the conception of the programme, which was eventually named Talentime by Tony Beamish. Palmer was then put in charge of producing the contest, which had its first edition held in February. He then served as the technical assistant to the Radio Malaya adaptation by Margery Morris of the Gustave Flaubert novel Madame Bovary, which aired on 18 September 1949. Palmer was on duty at the radio station when the Maria Hertogh riots had broken out on 11 December 1950. The crew was required to maintain a 24-hour service covering the riots and were unable to leave as the riots had spread to the area surrounding the Cathay Building. He claimed to have survived on "sardines and biscuits, though a Malay employee at the station who had brought his sarong and songkok with him to work was able to leave and buy food for the rest of the radio station employees. In 1952, Palmer served as the stage manager to the Show Business, 1952 variety show staged by Vernon Martinus at the Victoria Memorial Hall on 27 and 28 August.

For establishing the special effects library, Palmer was offered the opportunity to spend a year studying broadcasting at the BBC in London. The trip was to be sponsored by the Colonial Development and Welfare Fund. He left for London on 29 August 1952. There, he worked with the crew of The Goon Show, which served as his "first taste of television." After completing the course, he spent an additional two months on the staff of the BBC. Palmer returned to Singapore a year later and then established the Programme Engineering Division, for which he recruited several staff members including Winston Filmer, Judy Gimson, Kenneth Rappa and Jill Allen. He also oversaw the move of the record library to the station's new premises on Caldecott Hill. Palmer was one of several Eurasians who were employed at Radio Singapore in this period, along with Filmer, Rappa, Arthur Merrells, Kingsley Morrando, Claude Doral and Maisie Conceicao. He then acted as the master of ceremonies to the 1953 University Convocation Ball held in October at the Singapore Badminton Hall in aid of the University of Malaya Endowment Fund. Palmer again served as the stage manager to the 1954 edition of Show Business, staged by Martinus at the Victoria Memorial Hall from 17 to 20 June. Assisted in this role by Ian Clunies-Ross and Eric Maiden, he created the show's special effects and lighting. A critic from The Straits Times opined that he had "skillfully shed many and varied lights." Palmer was again on duty when the Hock Lee bus riots broke out on 12 May 1955, trapping him and his colleagues inside the station though this time the riots did not occur within sight of the station. In August 1955, he and Martinus served as the stage managers of the Magic Carpet, which was staged at the Capitol Cinema by the Singapore branch of the British Red Cross Society.

By February 1956, Palmer had been presenting programmes for several months. "Mike Watcher" of The Straits Times then opined that he had "improved beyond measure in these past few months." By May, he and Morrando had applied to fill a vacancy in the English Programmes Division of the station for Officers in Division I. Both of them had previously applied for the position on several occasions. However, the 1953 Schemes of Service stipulated a candidate for promotion "must either have an honours degree or its equivalent, or pass an internal examination of, presumably, a similar standard." However, according to "Mike Watcher", the acting Director of Broadcasting had "himself admitted that such qualifications were unnecessary when the candidates were of proved broadcasting ability and of long experience." Palmer had become a newsreader by July and "Mike Watcher" opined that he would be "the best local newsreader in a very short while." He also organised and produced the Malayanaires radio orchestra, which first aired towards the beginning of August and had "won a big listening audience in Malaya" by September. The following year, Palmer and Michael Smee produced a variety show staged at the Chinwoo Auditorium on 6 May.

In the later 1950s, Palmer left for the United States to attend a public relations and communications course at Boston University, where he learned from and worked with teams from stations such as CBS, ABC and NBC. He had been sent on this course to "assess the actual costs of running television." It was initially decided that the costs of running television would be too high and so plans for a television station were initially shelved. He was promoted to programme assistant in 1958. He produced On Your Mark, a variety show featuring "some of the biggest names in entertainment" locally staged at the Singapore Badminton Hall on 14 April in aid of the Asian Games Fund. Palmer produced that year's edition of the 8.30 Special, an annual charity variety show staged by Radio Malaya at the Victoria Theatre on 15 December in aid of the St. Andrew's Mission Hospital. He had also begun serving as the stage manager to performances of the Singapore Ballet Company founded and headed by Martinus, which had started that year. By the time the People's Action Party had come into power following the general elections held in May 1959, Palmer had been placed in charge of the station's foreign correspondents. The ruling party soon announced that all civil servants would receive pay cuts, which forced him and his colleagues to "tighten [their] budgets." Under the new government, he was sent to take courses at the Political Studies Centre, after which he claimed to have "understood much, much better the objectives of the PAP government". He produced Pupaswarna Singapura, a variety show staged at the Singapore Badminton Hall on 7 December as part of the Loyalty Week celebrations. It was billed as the "biggest ever" variety show organised by the station, which had been renamed Radio Singapore as the British granted Singapore more autonomy. It featured several prominent local stage and film celebrities, film actors from Hong Kong as well as performers from elsewhere.

In 1960, Palmer compèred alongside actor P. Ramlee at a gala event held at the Great World Cabaret on 4 June as part of the National Economic Development Fair. The Straits Times then described him as a "popular announcer". He produced Nyala Harapan, a "mammoth" variety show staged at the Singapore Badminton Hall on 24 July 1961 in aid of the Bukit Ho Swee National Fire Relief Fund. By December 1962, Palmer had become the head of English programmes at Radio Singapore. In the same year, when it was decided that a Central Productions Unit would be formed to cover local politics, he nominated Wong-Lee Siok Tin, who had recently been hired at Radio Singapore, as one of two employees who were to be transferred to this unit, with the other being Harry Crabb. In this period, Palmer and Crabb hosted the radio game show Double Your Money, which "established the two as personalities." In 1963, he was made the assistant head of programmes. In that year, TV Singapura had been formed as the station began to venture into television. Palmer was heavily involved in this due to his overseas experience. He had been appointed the acting head of programmes by June 1965. The station then was known as Radio Malaysia (Singapura) following the merger of Singapore with the Federation of Malaya. In 1966, he became the Controller of Television at the station, which had become Radio Television Singapore. On 1 October 1970, it was announced that Palmer had been appointed to the committee which was to oversee Singapore's first participation in the Adelaide Festival of the Arts.

=== Administrator ===
On 15 March 1972, following the retirement of Claude Doral, Palmer was appointed the Controller of Programme Administration while Lim Heng Tow was made the acting Controller of Television in his place. He was "responsible for organisation, coordinating and supervision of training course for the RTS staff. In June, it was announced that Palmer would be involved in the organisation of the Seventh SEAP Games, which were to be held in Singapore, being "in charge of floodlight, PA system and communication of results to Press, TV and radio, participating teams, SEAP Federation members, foreign delegates and observers, and others." The following year, he was appointed to the organising committee for the 1973 Singapore Grand Prix. He hosted a Radio Television Singapore one-hour special variety show to "usher in the new year" on 31 December 1974. Palmer received the Pingat Berkebolehan in December 1977. In January 1979, he was promoted to the newly-created role of Senior Controller of Programme Administration. Palmer reached retirement age in 1980, though he entered a two-year extended contract with the station, which was renamed the Singapore Broadcasting Corporation in January. He had entered the contract as he had believed that he "[had] something to offer in terms of training". By that month, he had been appointed the organisation's public relations officer. Palmer had been appointed the Assistant Director (Training) by July. He was responsible for the founding of the SBC Dancers, which debuted in October 1980. On 28 January 1981, after "years of administration which took him away from cameras and put him behind a desk", he presented a programme which gave a "behind-the-scenes look" into the producing of programmes.

=== Post-retirement activities ===
Palmer officially retired on 13 April 1982. However, a month later, he told the New Nation that while he "hope[d] to give [himself] a six-month rest", he believed that he was "going to be employed much sooner in something which may have to do with broadcasting." In July, he became the administrator for the Haggai Institute for Advanced Leadership Training, a Christian organisation which he claimed would train "professionals from Third World countries" into "World Leaders." He was an interviewee featured on Between Empires, a docu-drama by the Singapore Broadcasting Corporation on the Japanese Occupation in Singapore which aired in February 1992.

== Personal life and death ==
Palmer married Norma Phyllis Sheffield at the St. Andrew's Cathedral on 8 September 1954. The two had met during the production of Show Business, 1954, in which Norma was a performer. He had one son, politician Michael Palmer. By the time the People's Action Party had come into power, he had just acquired a house on Hua Guan Avenue, for which he had taken out a government loan and was thus paying monthly instalments, and had ordered several sets of furniture. Following the budget cuts, he paid for the already-completed kitchen and dining room furniture and cancelled his order for living and sitting room furniture. For the next few months, he lived with borrowed furniture. The family eventually moved to a house on Dunearn Road. Palmer was nicknamed "Mr. Radio" for his work.

Palmer later recalled that he had officially retired in 1982 due to "stress and his health starting to give way." By 2001, he had received a heart operation which had "set him back a bit." In his later years, Palmer suffered from heart and lung issues in addition to diabetes and was "largely confined to his home." On 19 November 2009, he was unable to eat. He was hospitalised and he died the following day of acute pneumonia.
