= Kingsley Morrando =

Singaporean radio personality (1914/15–1973)

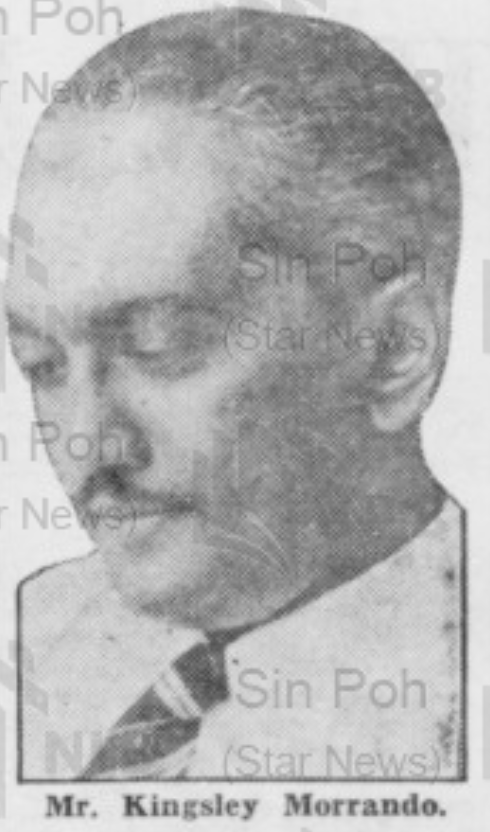
Morrando in 1954.

Kingsley Morrando (1914 or 1915 – 22 May 1973) was a Singaporean radio personality, disc jockey, talent promoter, compère and boxer best known for compèring the Radio Malaya talent competition Talentime from its first edition in 1949 to the 1960s, for which he was nicknamed "Mr. Talentime" or "Daddy of Talentime". In the 1930s, Morrando was a professional boxer and became the bantamweight champion of North Malaya in 1932.

== Early life and education ==
Morrando was born Ceylon in the mid-1910s. He was of Eurasian descent. He came to Singapore by September 1929, when he was a student at the St. Joseph's Institution. In his youth, he was a cricket player and a boxer, both of which he "excelled" at, the latter professionally. He had trained under Gunboat Jack and Al Rivers and fought under the ring name "Kid Young". He fought over 60 professional matches and became the bantamweight champion of North Malaya in 1932 after defeating Chan Peng Sun. He retired from boxing in 1935. Morrando worked with the Health Department and the League of Nations prior to World War II.

== Career ==
Morrando joined Radio Malaya in September 1945, shortly after the end of the Japanese Occupation of Singapore. By March 1947, he was hosting the Sports Round-up programme. In December 1948, he was elected the president of the newly-formed Singapore Broadcasting Employees Union, which by then had over 300 members. In 1949, he began compèring for Radio Malaya's Talentime, a newly-established talent competition. The competition continued to grow in popularity and by the 1960s, it had become a "major cultural phenomenon" in Singapore. For his role as the competition's compère, he was nicknamed "Mr. Talentime" and "Daddy of Talentime".

By February 1950, Morrando began hosting the Radio Malaya programme Listeners' Choice. Around this time, Morrando began searching for a crooner to sing two Doris Day numbers, the songs It's a Great Feeling and Someone Like You, at screenings of the musical comedy film It's a Great Feeling at the Capitol Theatre in May. After failing to find a suitable vocalist, Morrando, "half kidding", asked Maisie Conceicao, an assistant at the Record Library, if she could sing. When she told him that she could, he brought her to the studio, where he determined that Conceicao "was the girl [he] had been looking for." By June, he was also the host of the Spot the Favourites programme. By the following year, Morrando had "spotted" local dancer Barbara Deans and had given her her "break" by putting her on shows he was presenting at the local military bases. He also started the Evening Stars programme. In January 1953, Bill Webb Jones of The Singapore Standard opined compèring was "a position [Morrando] fills so admirably in this city which is quite beyond compare." He became a judge for the first Singapore Amateur Talent Quest, the finals of which were held in August of that year. The Sunday Standard reported in October 1954 that he had been responsible for putting "hundreds of boys and girls" on the air and giving many of them their "break". He had begun producing the Cowboy Ranch programme by then. He was then producing all of the request programmes at Radio Malaya. By July 1955, he had become the producer of the comedy programme Towkay's Tavern, which starred Larry Fenton, Claude Doral, Barbara Lee and Geoff Raymond, which was reportedly "well-received". In the same year, he was voted the champion disc jockey, becoming the first Asian to win that title. He won it again the following year.

The Straits Times radio critic "Mike Watcher" reported in October 1955 that Morrando was a Broadcasting Assistant Grade II, which meant that he was only a Division III officer despite being "Radio Malaya's star personality" and local radio's "most popular English-speaking personality." He criticised how Morrando was unable to receive a promotion due to the criteria set by the Public Service Commission, even though, "Mike Watcher" wrote: "No one questions [Morrando's] radio ability, his interviews have a friendliness and warmth that some of the others lack, he is the only non-Programme Assistant allowed to read the news, when allowed to handle a programme other than the usual disc-jockey programme he does so with enthusiasm and imagination." "Mike Watcher" further opined that the future of Morrando's career would be "bleak" should Radio Malaya continue to "run on typical Governmental lines." In December, N.A. Kularajah, the president of the Singapore Federation of Unions of Government Employees, announced that he would be asking Director of Personnel John Ward to "explain satisfactorily" was still in Division III, a "clerk's grade", threatening to report the matter to the Chief Secretary. Kularajah claimed that Morrando had been "carrying out the duties of a Division One man for years" and stated that the union was "preparing for a showdown on this issue." Ward then "assured" the union's delegation that a promotion for Morrando would be "considered."

In early 1956, Morrando was among the roughly 70 members of the Department of Broadcasting Employees' Union who quit the organisation to form the Radio Malaya programme staff union. He was elected the vice-president of this new union. It was announced in May that he would be leaving for Britain on a six-month scholarship to study broadcasting in the United Kingdom. The Straits Times then reported that through his request programmes, he had gone over 1,800,000 letters in the past eight years and that he had produced and compèred at least 10 major shows. "Mike Watcher" then reported that both Morrando and Vernon Palmer had again applied to fill a vacancy in the English Programmes Division of the station for Officers in Division I. Both of them had previously applied for the position on several occasions. However, the 1953 Schemes of Service stipulated a candidate for promotion "must either have an honours degree or its equivalent, or pass an internal examination of, presumably, a similar standard." According to "Mike Watcher", the acting Director of Broadcasting had "himself admitted that such qualifications were unnecessary when the candidates were of proved broadcasting ability and of long experience." "Mike Watcher" also noted that Morrando had not received an increase in salary in six years. However, the government then accused him of "failing to submit income tax returns from 1951 to 1955". He appeared in court on 10 May and pled "not guilty", and it was then announced that he would be tried on 12 December, after his return to Singapore in November. While on his trip, Morrando spent three months with the BBC, which was followed by a three-month course in "youth work". He returned to Singapore on 2 December and to broadcasting two days later.

In 1957, Morrando organised a rock and roll competition in aid of the Children's Aid Society after visiting the society's headquarters seeking material for his radio programmes. The contest was held at the Victoria Memorial Hall on 22 February and featured a trophy signed by Elvis Presley as its prize. Additionally, 100 signed photos of Elvis, 100 Elvis belts and 100 Elvis gold bracelets were sold, also in aid of the society. He was scheduled to appear in court for his tax trial on 20 March. His trial, initially scheduled for last December, had been postponed to allow for a defense application "for time to summon witnesses." Just before the trial, however, he asked to change his plea to "guilty" instead. However, Robert Chee did not allow him to "change [his] mind so quickly" and instead asked him to consult a lawyer on the case's "technical issues" before giving a final plea the following month. As such, the trial was postponed yet again. Morrando reappeared in court on 7 May, where he claimed to have believed that he was not required to "furnish his returns" as the tax department had been collecting his taxes through his employer since 1950. However, Chee did not accept this explanation, stating that "any reasonably intelligent man" would have inquired the tax department or his friends on such issues or would have gotten "fresh forms" to send returns. Morrando was fined $250.

Morrando was elected the assistant secretary of the Singapore Department of Broadcasting Employees Union in July 1958. In 1960, he was to serve as the producer for the variety shows held at the National Theatre as part of the first National Day celebrations. However, he was replaced by Palmer and Yusoff Ahmad after suffering a heart attack and collapsing during a rehearsal. At the 1962 edition of Talentime, the band Susan Lim and the Crescendos, who were participants, "[caught] the eye" of Morrando, who successfully convinced the record label Philips to record the band's debut album Mr Twister/Frankie. This was the "first record by a Singapore pop band released by an international record company." In that year, he had begun working for a talent company. In 1965, he discovered the Angels, who were billed as the country's first "all-girl beat band". In 1972, he formed the King's Men band, which was led by Wilson David and John Phillips. They performed in Awali, Bahrain in October, becoming the first Singaporean band to perform in that country.

== Personal life and death ==
Morrando married fellow radio personality Mary Soh, with whom he had one son. They lived in the Eu Court building on Hill Street. Morrando died of a heart attack in his home on 22 May 1973. His body was buried at the Choa Chu Kang Cemetery.
