= Harry Crabb =

Singaporean radio personality (1938/39–1981)

Crabb at a Workers' Party rally in 1976.

Charles Harry Crabb (1938 or 1939 – 1981) was a radio personality, newsreader, writer and diplomat active in Singapore from the 1960s to the 1970s. Crabb joined Radio Singapore in the 1960s and remained there for 12 years before serving with the Ministry of Foreign Affairs. He contested the 1976 Singaporean general election as a member of the Workers' Party.

== Early life and education ==
Crabb was born in the late 1930s. A Eurasian, his mother was Sumatran while his father was English. He spent World War II in England at a boarding school with his younger brother and sister. However, his father died in the war and his mother could no longer keep them at an English boarding school and so they returned to Singapore in 1949. He was educated at Raffles Institution. He then studied history and social structures at the University of Malaya.

== Career ==
While in Singapore, Crabb noticed differences between the Eurasian community of Singapore and the Eurasian community of the United Kingdom. A local publisher heard his opinions and recommended that he pen them down. Crabb then wrote Malaya's Eurasians — An Opinion, which went on sale at local bookshops in December 1959. Historian Christine Choo argued in 2007 that the book was "steeped with assimilationist overtones reminiscent of the thesis contained in Australia's Coloured Minority". By August of the following year, he had begun working at Radio Singapore, serving as a compère in a programme. Crabb was a sponsor of the Experimental Theatre Club at its founding in October 1961. By March 1963, Crabb had become a newsreader on TV Singapura. He was awarded the Pingat Pentadbiran Awam (Silver) in the same year. In the 1960s, he also hosted the game show Double Your Money with fellow broadcaster Vernon Palmer. The show "established the two as personalities."

In 1967, Crabb joined the Ministry of Foreign Affairs, though he remained with Radio and Television Singapore. He was then appointed the second secretary at the Singapore High Commission in India. In 1971, he resigned from both Radio Television Singapore and the Ministry of Foreign Affairs, after which he became the public relations manager of the Shangri-La Hotel Singapore. In August of the following year, he was appointed the hotel's public relations and advertising manager. The New Nation then reported that Crabb still served as a newsreader and commentary provider for Radio and Television Singapore on a part-time basis. By November 1973, Crabb had become the president of the Singaporean branch of the Kiwanis club.

By November 1974, Crabb had become the Public Affairs Controller of the Haw Par Group of Companies. However, he stopped serving in this position on 1 December 1975 and the public relations department was closed down. Crabb stated that the matter was "now in the hands of his lawyers" and added that he was now writing a book on Haw Par based on what he had learned during his time at the company. He claimed that he was already negotiating with a publishing company and that the book might be serialised in a London newspaper. In June 1976, he was elected a director of the East branch of the Rotary Club of Singapore.

On 11 December 1976, the Workers' Party officially announced that Crabb would be its candidate for the Serangoon Gardens Constituency in the upcoming general election, which was to be held on 23 December. However, he lost the election, receiving only 3,397 votes, with his opponent, Lau Teik Soon, winning with a majority of 4,074 votes. By April, he had become the party's press liaison officer. In early 1977, Crabb wrote and acted in the radio series Pop In. Three episodes were produced before the show was axed.

== Personal life and death ==
In October 1966, Crabb married Pinkie Leong, a sales and marketing representative with whom he had two children. However, Leong successfully filed for divorce on desertion grounds in September 1977, claiming that she was forced to live in a separate room with her two children from July 1972. She further accused him of being verbally and occasionally physically abusive. She also claimed to have made unsuccessful attempts to reconcile with him in 1975. By April 1978, Crabb and Leong had reached a mutual agreement regarding custody as they could not settle the matter in court, with Crabb having sought full custody. Eventually, they agreed that Crabb would have their children on weekdays while Leong would have them on the weekends. By then, Crabb had moved back in with his mother.

Around 1978, Crabb emigrated to Canterbury, England with his two children. He died on 21 October 198 and was found by his son and daughter. Leong had received a brief call from Harry's brother and his wife which informed her of his death without providing details.
