= Larry Fenton =

Singaporean comedian (1916–1989)

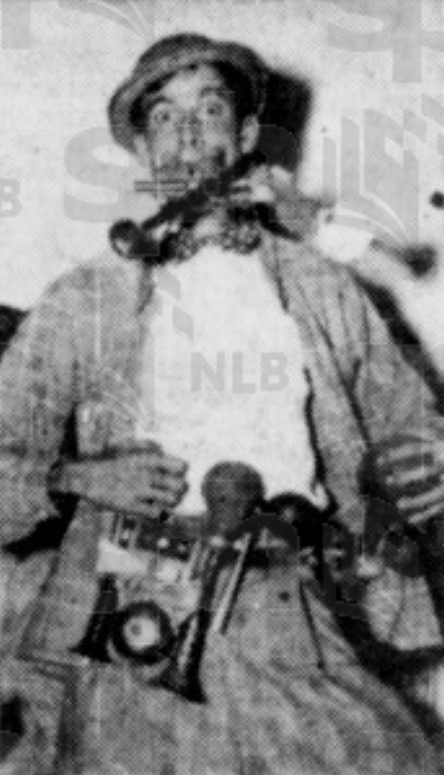
Fenton in 1953.

Lawrence Charles Fenton (1916 – 17 May 1989), better known as Larry Fenton, was a Singaporean comedian, musician and impressionist. He won the first edition of Talentime in 1949 with his band, the Tin Can Toledos, as well as the 1989 edition of Talent Quest as a one-man band. Fenton was also known for playing the character Muthu on the radio programme Towkay's Tavern.

== Early life ==
Fenton was born in Calcutta in the late 1910s to an English father and an "Anglo-French-Indian" mother. His parents, who were from South Africa, worked at a circus, with his father being an "acrobat, trickrider and clown". His father had run away from home as a teen to join the circus. Fenton would sleep under the bandstands during performances before eventually becoming a performer himself by age 10. Despite this, he "never studied music". The family travelled often and by the time he had come to Singapore he had been in India, Sri Lanka, Malaysia, Indonesia and Europe. In 1928, he and his family came to Singapore and became performers at the King Carnival, working with circus performers such as Chief Thunderface, King Hudson, Red Cannon and Henry Boggs. Fenton was the assistant to a magician called Professor Laird. At the age of around 16 or 17 he quit the circus.

== Career ==
In 1938, Fenton formed a "washboard outfit" called the Log Cabin Boys, which was followed by a band called the Silly Billies. The latter was more successful and featured on the British Malayan Broadcasting Corporation, which later became Radio Malaya. He also began working for the Municipal Town Cleansing Department in 1938. By the Japanese Occupation of Singapore, which began in 1942 and ended in 1945, he had volunteered to work the department's nightsoil division at Paya Lebar. He lived through the occupation without being interned at a camp.

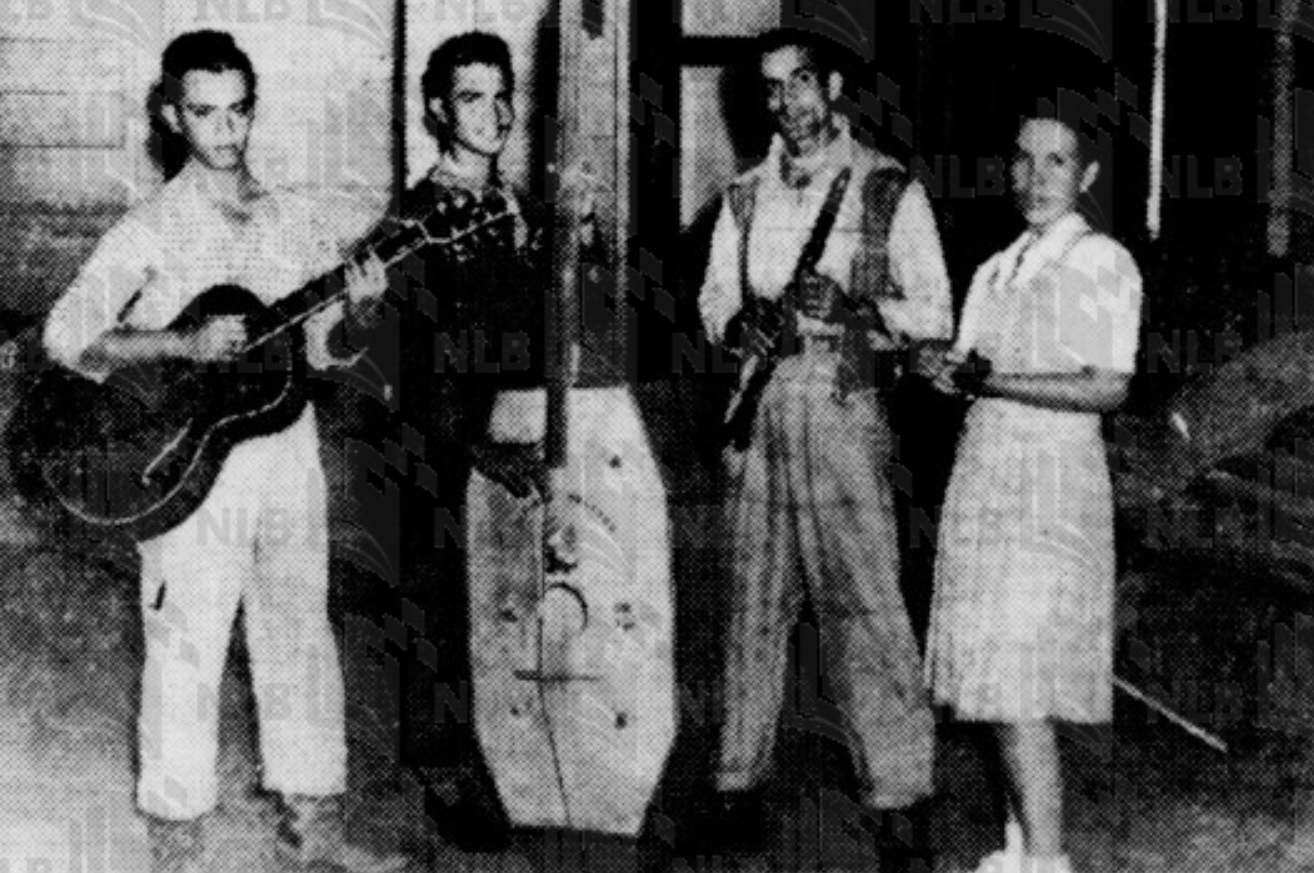
Fenton (second from right) with the members of the Tin Can Toledos in 1949.

In April 1949, Fenton participated in the first edition of the Radio Malaya talent competition Talentime as the leader of the "hillbilly band", the Tin Can Toledos, comprising Fenton, his first wife Laura and Carl and Leo Miles. The band played with various novelty instruments made by Fenton, who would also mimick the sound of instruments, play the harmonica, guitar, string bass and uke, and imitate celebrities and friends. The band were among eight acts who made it to the contests' finals, held at the Victoria Memorial Hall on 27 April. For the show, Fenton "wisecracked, mimicked and sang his way" through three musical numbers, with Laura on the slide whistle and Leo Miles on an "improvised double bass". He and his band were voted the winner of the contest by the audience, receiving $25 in prize money. As the winners of the first edition of Talentime, he and his band performed as guest artistes at the finals of the second edition of the contest, held at the Singapore Volunteer Corps Drill Hall on 10 August.

In November 1950, Fenton and the Tin Can Toledos performed at the HMS Terror barracks at the Singapore Naval Base in Sembawang, along with singers Maisie Conceicao and Johnny Farrel and dancers Barbara Deans and Eleanor Ross. Columnist Toni Walsh of The Straits Times called Fenton a "terrific entertainer". Fenton and his band performed at a two-hour variety show held at the YMCA Hall on 13 March 1951, along with the Manasseh Sisters, baritone Patterson Hutton and tenor Paddy Barrett. The following month, the band performed in the variety show Show Business, staged at the Victoria Memorial Hall on 4 April by Vernon Martinus. Due to its success, a repeat performance was held on 27 April. The band performed at a variety show staged on 7 November at the stadium at the Happy World Amusement Park. Fenton himself performed in Show Business, 1952, staged again at the Victoria Memorial Hall by Martinus in August 1952. Critic "R.W.B." of The Straits Times called him a "comedian of considerable wit."

Fenton starred on the Radio Malaya comedy programme Towkay's Tavern, which began airing in the middle of 1955. He played the characters Muthu, a "madcap" tavern employee and Ah Foo, the tavernkeeper. He and his band participated in the all-Malaya Talentime Competition held at the Singapore Badminton Hall over three nights in November. In the same year, he retired from the Cleansing Department. Fenton later formed a group called The Three Bows, who were featured on Radio Malaya's Evening Stars. In April, he served as the master of ceremonies to a dance and floor show held by the Filipino Association of Singapore in April 1956 at the Raffles Hotel. Fenton and his "family of comedians" were one of several acts performing at a variety show staged by the Young Christian Workers Movement Singapore at the Holy Infant Jesus School Hall on 27 and 28 February 1960. He compered and performed with his family at the dance at the Fraser and Neave Hall organised by the Singapore Amateur Boxing Association in August 1961. Fenton also performed in and wrote the script for a radio programme called Jest For You which ran for an "unprecendented" 104 weeks.

In the middle of the 1970s, Fenton began working for a law firm. He remained there for 14 years before retiring in May 1988. In February 1989, he participated in the Singapore Broadcasting Corporation's Talent Quest. He performed a rendition of Old MacDonald Had a Farm using a washboard made of aluminium foil, car horns and a child's tambourine. He also mimicked animal noises. Fenton was one of 12 acts out of 135 who were selected for the Grand Final of the contest, which was held at the SBC Radio Auditorium. He was voted the winner of the competition.

== Personal life and death ==
In 1953, Fenton claimed to speak Malay, Tamil, Hindustani, Sinhalese, Tagalog and Afrikaans fluently in addition to English. In February 1940, he married Laura Evelyn Siddons, a fellow member of the Sillybillies band. She was of both Filipino and English descent and they had a son and a daughter. Fenton later remarried Gwendoline Muriel. In February 1989, Fenton claimed to speak English, Hokkien, Malay, Tamil and Hindustani fluently instead.

At the end of April 1989, Fenton suffered a stroke and fell into a coma. He regained consciousness while in hospital but fell into a coma again soon after. He died on 17 May 1989.
