= Girl from Havana =

- Theatrical release poster
- Directed by: Lew Landers
- Screenplay by: Malcolm Stuart Boylan; Karl Brown
- Produced by: Robert North
- Starring: Dennis O'Keefe; Claire Carleton; Victor Jory; Steffi Duna; Gordon Jones; Bradley Page
- Cinematography: Ernest Miller
- Edited by: William Morgan
- Music by: William Lava
- Production company: Republic Pictures
- Distributed by: Republic Pictures
- Release date: September 11, 1940
- Running time: 69 minutes
- Country: United States
- Language: English

Girl from Havana is a 1940 American drama film directed by Lew Landers and written by Malcolm Stuart Boylan and Karl Brown. The film stars Dennis O'Keefe, Claire Carleton, Victor Jory, Steffi Duna, Gordon Jones and Bradley Page. The film was released on September 11, 1940, by Republic Pictures.

== Plot ==
Woody and Tex, a pair of American oilmen working in South America, both fall for a beautiful young woman they simply call "Havana." The more prosperous suitor is Tex, who just earned a $2,500 bonus due to Woody planting explosives to bring oil up in his derrick, but the oil comes up in Tex's instead. Tex doesn't share the bounty that sets the two against each other. Woody bets Tex in love when Havana is more smitten with Woody, who lands in jail after using Havana's loaded dice in a craps game.

Woody, fired from his job, is sprung by pal Tubby Waters, who is then killed by a man named Drenov in a fight when he tries to protect Woody. Woody avenges him by killing Drenov, whose job he is promptly offered as a gunrunner to Captain Lazear, a revolutionary.

Sensing that he is in grave danger, Havana ventures into the jungle to find Woody near a hidden storehouse of ammunition. explosives and weapons including Tommy guns and hand grenades. There she encounters Lazear's jealous girlfriend, Chita, and pretends she and Woody are married. Tex arrives to help Woody fight off the revolutionaries using the smuggled arms, then is by their side again when Woody and Havana are actually wed.

== Cast ==
- Dennis O'Keefe as Woody Davis
- Claire Carleton as Havana
- Victor Jory as Tex Moore
- Steffi Duna as Chita
- Gordon Jones as Tubby Waters
- Bradley Page as Cort
- Addison Richards as Harrigan
- Abner Biberman as Captain Lazear
- William Edmunds as Ricco
- Trevor Bardette as Drenov
- Jay Novello as Manuel
- Frank Lackteen as Captured smuggler

== Soundtrack ==
- Girl from Havana

Music by Jule Styne
Lyrics by Sol Meyer and George R. Brown

- Querido, Take Me Tonight

Music by Jule Styne
Lyrics by Sol Meyer and George R. Brown

- Terrace Rhumba

Music by Cy Feuer

- Midnight Tango

Music by William Lava
