= Wong-Lee Siok Tin =

Singaporean journalist (1938–1993)

- Born: 1938
- Died: 1993 (aged 54–55)
- Occupation: Journalist
- Known for: Head of Broadcasting at the Singapore Broadcasting Corporation

Wong-Lee Siok Tin (1938–1993) was a Singaporean journalist and head of broadcasting at the Singapore Broadcasting Corporation between 1981 and 1991. During her tenure she was credited with diversifying programming to include niche interests and for overseeing the creation of Channel 12. In 2017 she was inducted in the Singapore Women's Hall of Fame for her contribution towards Singaporean journalism.

== Biography ==
Wong-Lee was born in Singapore in 1938 and attended the Convent of the Holy Infant Jesus school. She was very active in her school's drama club, often playing lead roles in the school plays. Furthermore, Wong-Lee won the Singapore Rotary Public Speaking contest in 1955. Noted for her clear and articulate voice, she entered broadcast in the 1950s as a part-time announcer for Radio Malaya while studying for an English degree at the University of Singapore, where she graduated with honors in English.

After a brief spell as a teacher at Raffles Girls School, Wong-Lee returned to broadcasting and was assigned to accompany then-Prime Minister Lee Kuan Yew to London. There, she worked on reporting negotiations for Singapore's independence from Britain. Impressed with her ability to effectively summarize reports, Lee Kuan Yew had her accompany him on many future trips and took advice from her on how to write scripts. Afterwards, she quickly rose through the ranks of what was then the Ministry of Culture's Department of Broadcasting to become the head of the Central Productions Unit and then its deputy director in 1978, becoming the first woman head of the department.

In 1980, broadcasting in Singapore was partly privatized, leading to the creation of the Singapore Broadcasting Corporation. With none of the board members having any experience in broadcasting, Wong-Lee was promoted from deputy general manager to general manager, overseeing the network's broadcasting. In her role, Wong-Lee made changes to the type of programming offered to audiences. Formally, television was used as tool for the government to broadcast messages; however, Wong-Lee stressed the importance of diverse programming, offering segments on art and music. In 1991, Wong-Lee was diagnosed with cancer and retired in her role as general manager. Two years later she died of her illness.

In 2017, Wong-Lee was one of seven women inducted as an honoree into the 4th Singapore Women's Hall of Fame for setting the standard for Singapore's Broadcast journalists.
