= Wedding Rings (film) =

1929 film

- Directed by: William Beaudine
- Written by: Ray Harris
- Based on: Wedding Rings by Ernest Pascal
- Produced by: Robert North
- Starring: H.B. Warner; Lois Wilson; Olive Borden; Hallam Cooley
- Cinematography: Ernest Haller
- Production company: First National Pictures
- Distributed by: Warner Bros. Pictures
- Release date: December 29, 1929; (Limited release)
- Running time: 74 minutes
- Country: United States
- Languages: Sound (All-Talking); English

Wedding Rings is a 1929 American all-talking sound Pre-Code drama film directed by William Beaudine and starring H.B. Warner, Lois Wilson and Olive Borden. It is considered a lost film. Due to its adult subject matter, the film was banned from being shown by censors in many locations. First National Pictures had previously filmed the story back in 1924 until the title of the source novel, namely, The Dark Swan.

== Plot ==
Eve Quinn, a shallow but attractive debutante, makes a practice of leading men on, then coolly casting them aside for new conquests. She openly boasts that she would find pleasure in taking a man from her sister, Cornelia, who is an art student. When Cornelia falls in love with wealthy clubman Lewis Dike, Eve succeeds in vamping and capturing him; broken-hearted when they marry, Cornelia deliberately introduces Eve to Wilfred Meadows, a playboy with whom she begins a flirtation. Dike soon tires of the modernistic furnishings of their home and the jazz-mad parasites who frequent his drawing room, and he is refreshed by visits to Cornelia. When Dike accidentally learns of Eve's liaison with Wilfred, he realizes his error and is reunited with Cornelia.

== Cast ==
- H.B. Warner as Lewis Dike
- Lois Wilson as Cornelia Quinn
- Olive Borden as Eve Quinn
- Hallam Cooley as Wilfred Meadows
- James Ford as Tim Hazleton
- Kathlyn Williams as Agatha

== Music ==
The film features a theme song entitled "Love Will Last Forever (If It's True)" with music by Edward Ward and lyrics by Al Bryan. The film is sung by Lois Wilson in the film. A second song, entitled "That's My Business," with music by Edward Ward and lyrics by Al Bryan, is also featured and is sung by Olive Borden in the film.

== See also ==
- List of early sound feature films (1926–1929)
