= Claire Carleton =

American actress (1913–1979)

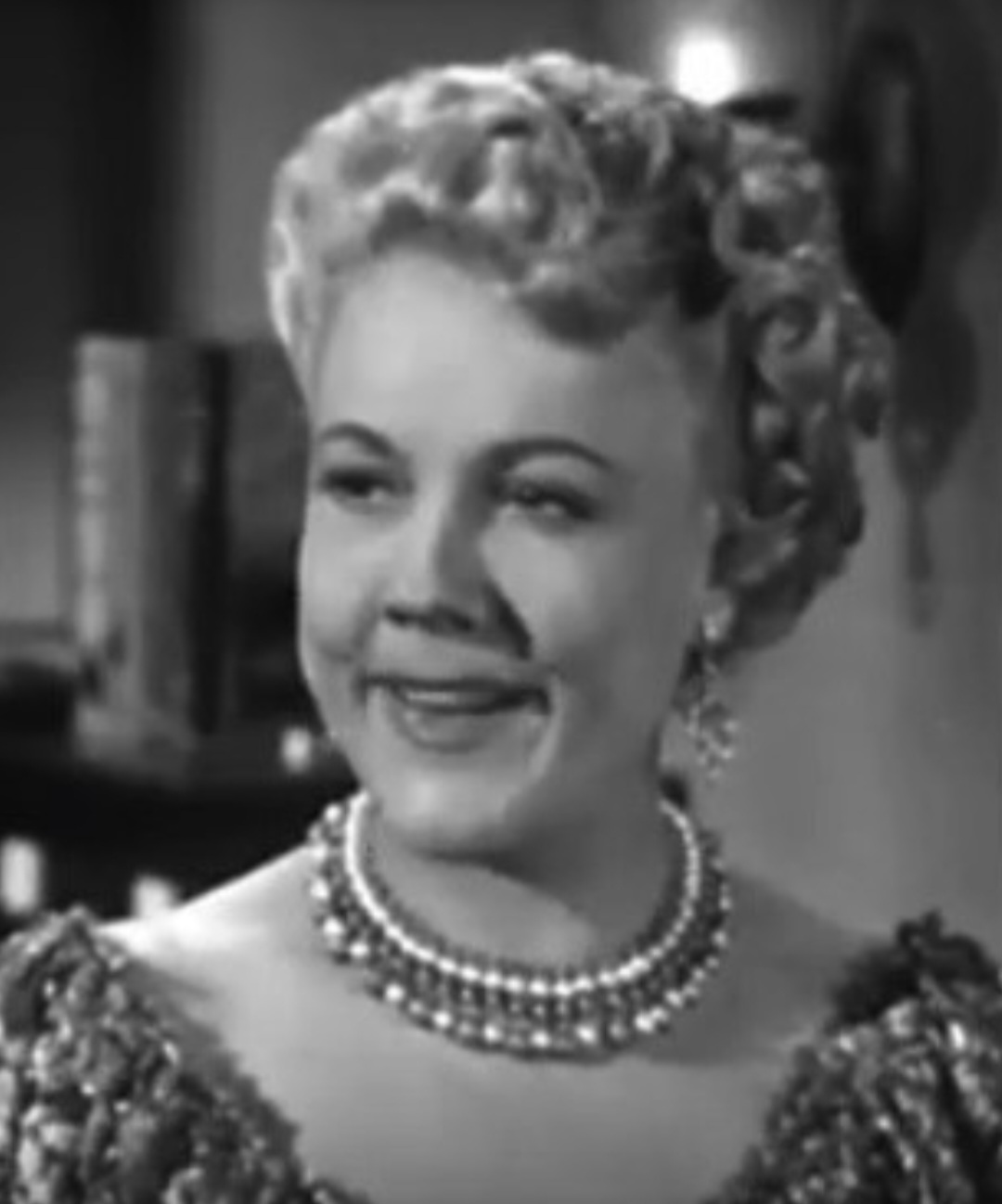
- Carleton in the 1954 TV series Stories of the Century, episode "Ben Thompson"
- Born: September 28, 1913; New York City, U.S.
- Died: December 11, 1979 (aged 66); Northridge, California, U.S.
- Resting place: Forest Lawn Memorial Park (Hollywood Hills)
- Occupation: Actress
- Years active: 1932–1969
- Political party: Democratic
- Spouse: Fred E. Sherman (died 1969)

Claire Carleton (September 28, 1913 – December 11, 1979) was an American actress whose career spanned four decades from the 1930s through the 1960s. She appeared in over 100 films, the majority of them features, and on numerous television shows, including several recurring roles. In addition to her screen acting, she had a successful stage career.

== Early life ==
Carleton was born in Brooklyn, New York City, the daughter of Mr. and Mrs. George Carleton. Her father, an attorney, "always took a great interest in the theatre and its associations". He managed the Colonial Theater Repertory Company in Norfolk, Virginia, and she began performing roles in plays at age 13.

== Career ==
Carleton was a writer early in her career. Her poetry was published, she wrote about art for magazines and newspapers, and she wrote copy for advertisements. She was assistant editor of the Bulletin of the Art Institute.

Carleton began acting on the stage with the DeWolf Hopper Opera Company, serving as understudy for the prima donna in all of its productions. She eventually reached Broadway, where she made her debut as Lucy in the short-lived play, Blue Monday in June, 1932.

Although she made her film debut in a small role in a 1933 film short, Seasoned Greetings, and continued to occasionally make shorts for the remainder of the decade, she concentrated on her stage career during the 1930s. She made her first appearance in a feature film in 1940's Millionaire Playboy, starring Joe Penner, Linda Hayes, and Russ Brown. During her film career she was often cast as the "other woman", or in a sexually promiscuous role.

Her career ran the gamut of roles, from small, uncredited, unnamed roles, such as a nightclub patron in the 1949 musical, On the Town, to small supporting roles such as Vicki Vale in 1948's If You Knew Susie, to small featured roles such as Miss Francis in the classic drama Death of a Salesman (1951), and leading roles such as in Girl from Havana (1940), in which "Havana" was her character's name, and Gildersleeve on Broadway (1943), where she played Francine Gray. She had featured supporting roles in numerous films, among the most notable being: the lead of Kay Stevens in the 1941 Western mystery The Great Train Robbery; as Ruby LaRue in A Night of Adventure (1944), starring Tom Conway; as Belle Townley in the 1946 western, Gun Town, starring Kirby Grant; in one of The Shadow films, The Missing Lady (1946), in the role of Rose Dawson; and Grace in 1949's It's a Great Feeling, starring Doris Day, Jack Carson, and Dennis Morgan. During the mid-1940s she also starred in a series of two-reelers with Leon Errol, such as 1946's Poppa Knows Worst.

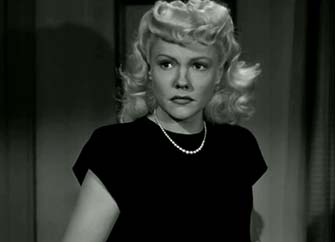
Carleton in A Close Call for Boston Blackie (1946)

Other notable films in which she appeared include: Rookies in Burma (1943), starring the comedy duo of Wally Brown and Alan Carney, in which she had the featured role of Connie; the 1944 musical Show Business, starring Eddie Cantor and George Murphy; the 1947 comedy The Senator Was Indiscreet, starring William Powell; in George Cukor's A Double Life (1947), starring Ronald Colman; the Fred Astaire and Ginger Rogers musical, The Barkleys of Broadway (1949); in another Cukor film, Born Yesterday, starring Judy Holliday (in an Oscar-winning performance), William Holden, and Broderick Crawford; the 1954 suspense drama, Witness to Murder, starring Barbara Stanwyck, George Sanders, and Gary Merrill; and the biopic, The Buster Keaton Story (1957), starring Donald O'Connor, Ann Blyth, and Rhonda Fleming.

With the advent of television, Carleton transitioned to the small screen in the 1950s, and by the 1960s, she worked almost solely in that medium. Her final big-screen appearance was in 1961's The Devil's Partner, in the featured role of Ida. Carleton's television debut was on the DuMont Television Network's crime drama series Front Page Detective in 1951, in which she had a starring guest appearance in the episode titled, "Frame for Murder". In 1954–5, she co-starred as Nell Mulligan, Mickey Rooney's mother, on The Mickey Rooney Show, though she was only seven years older than Rooney. She had other recurring roles on television, including that of Alice Purdy on Cimarron City, which starred George Montgomery. She appeared as a guest on dozens of other television shows, including Hopalong Cassidy (1952), The Abbott and Costello Show (1953), Mr. & Mrs. North (1953), The Gene Autry Show (1954), Treasury Men in Action (1954–5), Studio 57, The Millionaire (1955–6), Sneak Preview (1956), The Lone Ranger, several appearances on Schlitz Playhouse, Maverick (1958) with James Garner in the episode "The Lonesome Reunion", Perry Mason (1959) with Raymond Burr, several appearances on M Squad (1959) with Lee Marvin, Leave It to Beaver (1959), Make Room for Daddy (later known as The Danny Thomas Show - 1958 & 1960), several appearances on Alfred Hitchcock Presents from 1956 to 1961, 77 Sunset Strip (1962) with Efrem Zimbalist Jr., Hazel (1962–63) with Shirley Booth, several performances from 1960 to 1965 on Wagon Train, and The Munsters (1964). Her final acting performance was in a small role as a store clerk during the eighth season of the television series The Virginian in 1969.

== Personal life ==
Carleton married actor Fred Sherman on February 14, 1944, in Hollywood, California. They remained married until his death in 1969. She died from cancer on December 11, 1979, aged 66, in her home in Northridge, Los Angeles, California, and was interred next to her husband at Forest Lawn Memorial Park in Hollywood Hills, California.

== Filmography ==
(Per AFI database)

- Melody and Moonlight (1940) as Gloria
- The Crooked Road (1940) as Virgie Gobel
- Girl from Havana (1940) as Havana
- Grand Ole Opry (1940) as Ginger Gordon
- Sing, Dance, Plenty Hot (1940) as Evelyn
- The Great Train Robbery (1941) as Kay Stevens
- Petticoat Politics (1941) as Tilly
- Gildersleeve on Broadway (1943) as Francine Gray
- Lady of Burlesque (1943) as Sandra
- Rookies in Burma (1943) as Connie - the Blonde
- The Adventures of a Rookie (1943) as First Nurse (uncredited)
- Around the World (1943) as WAAC Lieutenant Spencer (uncredited)
- My Pal Wolf (1944) as Ruby, the Cook
- A Night of Adventure (1944) as Ruby LaRue
- Show Business (1944) as Nurse (uncredited)
- Youth Runs Wild (1944) as Taxi Driver (uncredited)
- Bride by Mistake (1944) as Nurse Harrison (uncredited)
- Frontier Gal (1945) as Gracie (uncredited)
- A Close Call for Boston Blackie (1946) as Mamie Kirwin (uncredited)
- Crime Doctor's Man Hunt (1946) as Ruby Farrell
- Gun Town (1946) as Belle Townley
- The Missing Lady (1946) as Rose Dawson
- That Texas Jamboree (1946) as Lulubelle (uncredited)
- Vacation in Reno (1946) as Sally Beaver
- Key Witness (1947) as Receptionist (uncredited)
- Linda, Be Good (1947) as Myrtle
- Too Many Winners (1947) as Mayme Martin
- The Senator Was Indiscreet (1947) as Ingred
- Bodyguard (1948)
- A Double Life (1948)
- I Love Trouble (1948) as Irene Feston - Tired Blonde (uncredited)
- If You Knew Susie (1948) as Steve's Lady Friend (uncredited)
- Ruthless (1948) as Bella
- The Time of Your Life (1948) as 'Killer'
- Bad Men of Tombstone (1949) as Nellie
- The Barkleys of Broadway (1949) as Marie (uncredited)
- The Crime Doctor's Diary (1949) as Louise (uncredited)
- It's a Great Feeling (1949) as Grace
- On the Town (1949) as Nightclub Patron (uncredited)
- The Reckless Moment (1949) as Blond (uncredited)
- Red Light (1949) as Waitress (uncredited)
- Satan's Cradle (1949) as Belle
- Shockproof (1949) as Florrie Kobiski (uncredited)
- Born Yesterday (1951) as Helen
- Honeychile (1951) as Betty Loring
- The Son of Dr. Jekyll (1951) as Hazel Sorelle (uncredited)
- Two of a Kind (1951) as Minnie Mitt (uncredited)
- Westward the Women (1951) as Flashy Woman (uncredited)
- Death of a Salesman (1952) as Miss Francis
- Bal Tabarin (1952) as Stella Simmons
- The Fighter (1952) as Stella
- Ride the Man Down (1952) as Amelia
- Jubilee Trail (1954) as Estelle the Madam (uncredited)
- Witness to Murder (1954) as May - Mental Patient
- Love Me or Leave Me (1955) as Claire (uncredited)
- Accused of Murder (1956) as Marge Harris
- The Black Sleep (1956) as Carmona Daly
- Slander (1957) as Elsie (uncredited)
- The Buster Keaton Story (1957) as Myra Keaton
- The Careless Years (1957) as Aunt Martha (uncredited)
- Death in Small Doses (1957) as Mabel (uncredited)
- My Gun Is Quick (1957) as Proprietess
- Reform School Girl (1957) as Mrs. Rita Horvath
- Unwed Mother (1958) as Mrs. Miller
- Fort Massacre (1958) as Adele
- A Lust to Kill (1958) as Minny
- The Miracle of the Hills (1959) as Sally
- Devil's Partner (shot in 1958, released in 1961) as Ida

== Selected television appearances ==
- Alfred Hitchcock Presents (1956) (Season 1 Episode 20: "And So Died Riabouchinska") as Alice Fabian
- Alfred Hitchcock Presents (1958) (Season 4 Episode 3: "The Jokester") as Millie
- Alfred Hitchcock Presents (1961) (Season 6 Episode 30: "You Can Trust a Man") as Pauline
- ‘’Leave It To Beaver’’ (1959) (Season 3 Episode 13: “June’s Birthday”) as the saleslady
- The Munsters (1964) (Season 1 Episode 2: "Love at First Sight") as Mrs. Gribbins
- The Three Stooges (1947) (Season 4 Episode 1 "Fright Night") as Kitty
