= A Notorious Affair =

1930 film

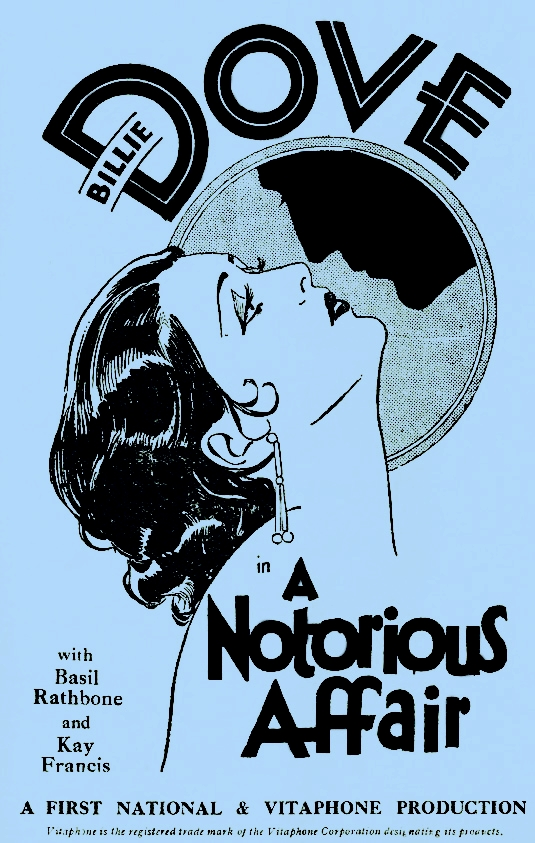
- Directed by: Lloyd Bacon
- Written by: Contributing writers: Forrest Halsey; Lillian Hayward; Earle Roebuck
- Screenplay by: J. Grubb Alexander
- Based on: Fame (1929 play) by Audrey and Waverly Carter
- Produced by: Robert North
- Starring: Billie Dove
- Cinematography: Ernest Haller
- Edited by: Frank Ware
- Music by: Cecil Copping
- Production company: First National Pictures
- Distributed by: First National Pictures
- Release dates: April 25, 1930 (New York City); May 4, 1930 (U.S.)
- Running time: 70 minutes
- Country: United States
- Language: English

A Notorious Affair is a 1930 American pre-Code drama film, produced and released by First National Pictures. It was directed by Lloyd Bacon, starred Billie Dove, and featured Basil Rathbone and Kay Francis. The film was adapted from the play Fame, which was written by Audrey and Waverly Carter.

== Plot ==
Lady Patricia, a London socialite engaged to another aristocrat, shocks her father and social class by marrying the poor Italian violinist Paul Gherardi. Countess Olga Balakireff, a vamp who likes to fool around with men below her station, takes an interest in Gherardi, as well. Unbeknownst to Patricia, Balakireff uses her influence to make Paul famous and, in return, ensnares him in an affair. The double strain of fame and deceit causes Paul to suffer a collapse at Balakireff's house. Dr. Pomeroy is sent for; he happens to be one of Patricia's former lovers. Pomeroy has Paul taken home, where Patricia quickly uncovers the facts. The Gherardis separate. While Dr. Pomeroy ardently courts Patricia, Paul cohabits with Balakireff in the South of France, until she has had her fun and leaves him. Paul then suffers a paralytic attack. Patricia and Dr. Pomeroy take Paul to a surgeon for an operation, and Patricia stays at her husband's side to nurse him back to health. After a month, Paul still seems to have made no progress. He cannot move his finger. Paul tells Patricia that he knows that she wants to leave him for Pomeroy but that a divorce from a paralyzed man would be impossible. “I will always be lying here between you,” he says. Pomeroy examines him and after he leaves the room, Paul moves his arms. Pomeroy and Patricia say goodbye forever, and after Pomeroy drives away, Patricia hears the sound of Paul's violin. He has, in fact, been fully recovered for a month. She is overjoyed that the operation was a success. He has just discovered that his heart was paralyzed, too, with fame. Perhaps we are both free now, she says. He sets her free to go to Pomeroy. It must have taken more than mere selfishness for him to lie motionless between her and her happiness, she says. He laughs at himself for being a melodramatic coward. How could he expect to hold her with pity? he asks. When love was all that was necessary, she replies. They step to the window with a view of the ocean, gazing into each other's eyes, and embrace, kissing each other.

== Cast ==
- Billie Dove as Lady Patricia Hanley Gherardi
- Basil Rathbone as Paul Gherardi
- Kay Francis as Countess Olga Balakireff
- Kenneth Thomson as Dr. Alan Pomeroy
- Montagu Love as Sir Thomas Hanley
- Malcolm Waite as Higgins, Countess Balakireff's butler

== Reception ==
Leonard Maltin gives the film two out of four stars, commenting, “ Plush production can't save this stagy soap opera.”

Although Billie Dove was supposed to be the star, The New York Times reported that in spite of “lending a decorative presence, her speeches pale beside a performance of one so expert as Mr. Rathbone. Kay Francis, too, as the scheming countess, puts Miss Dove somewhat in the shade” .

== Preservation ==
The film survives intact and has been broadcast on television and cable. A print is held by the Library of Congress and it has since been owned by Turner Entertainment Co.
