= Robert North (producer) =

American film producer

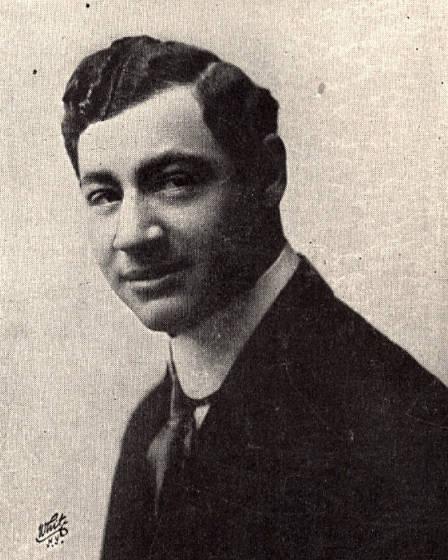
- Bobby North in 1913
- Born: 2 February 1884; New York City, US
- Died: 13 August 1976 (aged 92); Los Angeles, California, US
- Occupations: Comedian, film producer

Robert North (February 2, 1884 – August 13, 1976) was an American vaudeville performer who became a success as a stand-up comedian. Later he became a prolific motion picture producer.

== Early years ==
Bobby North was born in New York City. He joined a vaudeville company at the age of twelve as a boy balcony singer. As North explained, "... there was a vogue of a soubrette, as we called her, singing on the stage, and a kid would get up from the gallery and sing the chorus. The Gallery Gods, of course, thought he was one of them and applauded loudly. I was the kid in the gallery. I had the voice and I could sing." North traveled around the US with the company playing in small town opera houses or theaters for one- or two-night stands. He developed a song and dance act.

== Theater success ==
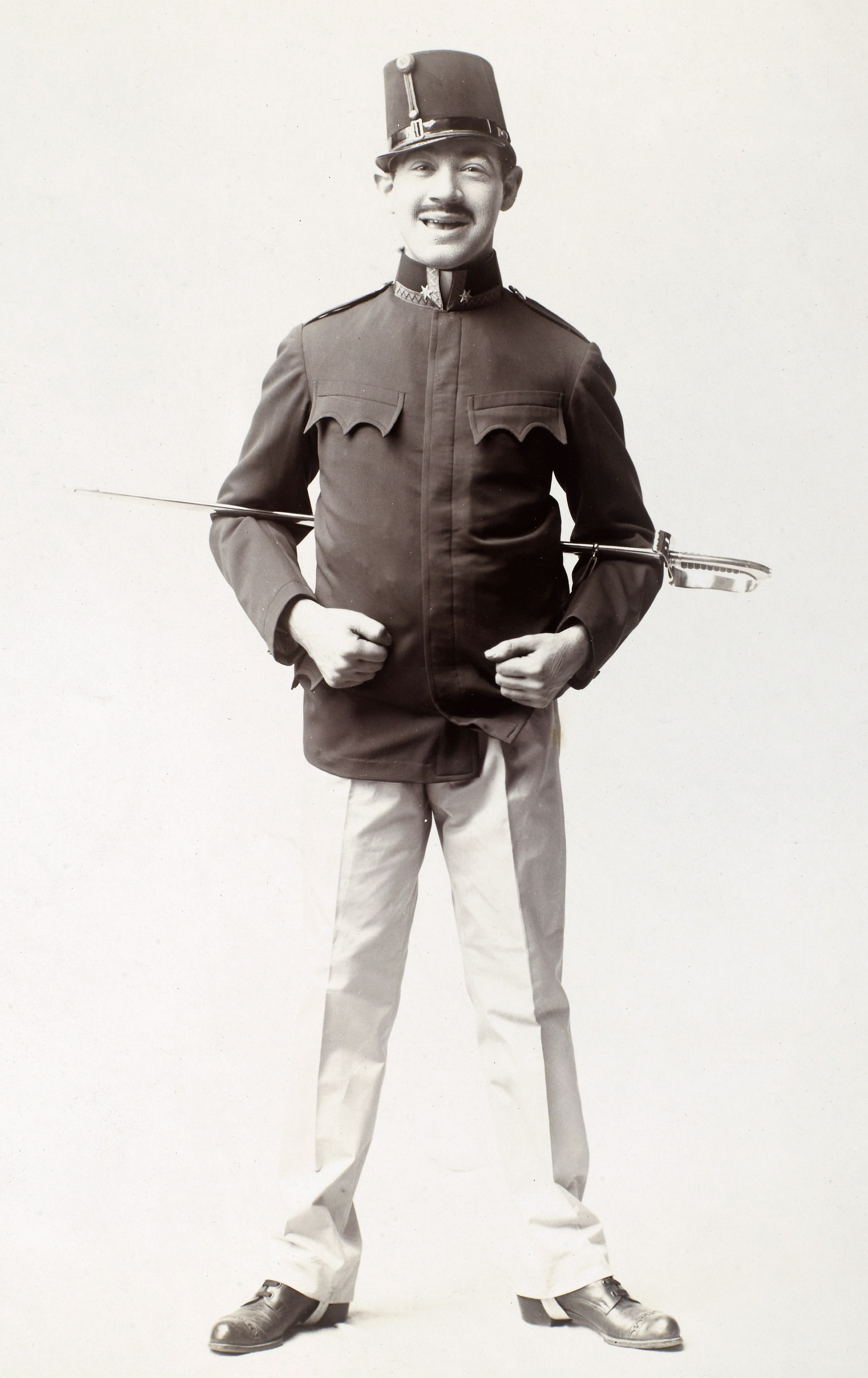
Bobby North in the New York production of Emmerich Kálmán's operetta The Gay Hussars (1909)

In January 1909 North performed as a "Hebrew impersonator" at the Colonial Theatre in New York. In this act he told humorous stories with a Jewish accent and sang parodies of popular songs. He would continue to perform this act between other roles. These include a part in 1909 in the Emmerich Kálmán operetta The Gay Hussars, and a straight role in 1910 in the play Just a Wife.

North was a star of the Ziegfeld Follies of 1910. In one number he acted as a Jew in love with an Irish girl, and sang My Yiddisha Colleen to Shirley Kellogg. The song illustrates the common stereotypes and ethnic humor of the period, with verses like "I'll jig and Irish reel each morning, if you'll dance Kazotski ev'ry dawn ... And I'll even kiss the Blarney stone, if you'll change your name to Maggie Cohn." North closed the second act of the Follies of 1910 with a solo performance of the Gus Edwards song The Waltzing Lieutenant. Variety editor Sime Silverman praised North's performance. The 1910 Ziegfeld Follies played in over twenty theaters in major cities around the country, including Philadelphia, Pittsburgh, Cleveland, Chicago, Des Moines, Kansas City and San Francisco, where North was the local favorite. The company of over one hundred traveled in style in a special train, and stayed at the best hotels.

North married Stella Maury, another vaudeville and Ziegfeld Follies trouper. Their son Edmund H. North was born in Manhattan on March 12, 1911 (Edmund later became a successful screenwriter).

In 1911 North and Cliff Gordon were managing the Columbia Theatre on Broadway, one of the Eastern Burlesque Wheel's houses. They decided to offer a "higher" class of show with a fresh version of The Merry Whirl, which opened on June 12, 1911. The biggest song hit was Alexander's Ragtime Band by Irving Berlin. According to Variety the show was "as classy as burlesque ever held—classier even." The Merry Whirl was very profitable, but on August 12 it was announced that it would end its run in New York and "proceed over the regular Eastern Wheel route assigned to it ... much to the regret of the house and the management."

North was a comedian in Hanky Panky (1912). Other stars were Carter DeHaven and Myrtle Gilbert. This "Jumble of Jollification" produced by Lew Fields opened at the Broadway Theatre on August 5, 1912 and ran there for 104 performances. Hanky Panky then moved to another theatre in New York before going on the road for a further 32 weeks. In 1913 North played at the Winter Garden Theatre in the Lew Fields' revue The Pleasure Seekers. The show was not successful and closed after two months. In 1914 he headlined at the Palace Theatre on Broadway with his "Hebrew impersonator" act. In 1915 North was among the cast of Lew Fields' musical review Hands Up, as were Fanny Brice and her brother Lew Brice. The show played in New Haven, Connecticut, June 7–9, but did not open in New York the next day as planned. Eventually Hands Up did make it to New York City, but without North and the Brices. The reason given was that they each used a very similar "Hebrew accent", and it was hard to distinguish them on stage.

== Film ==
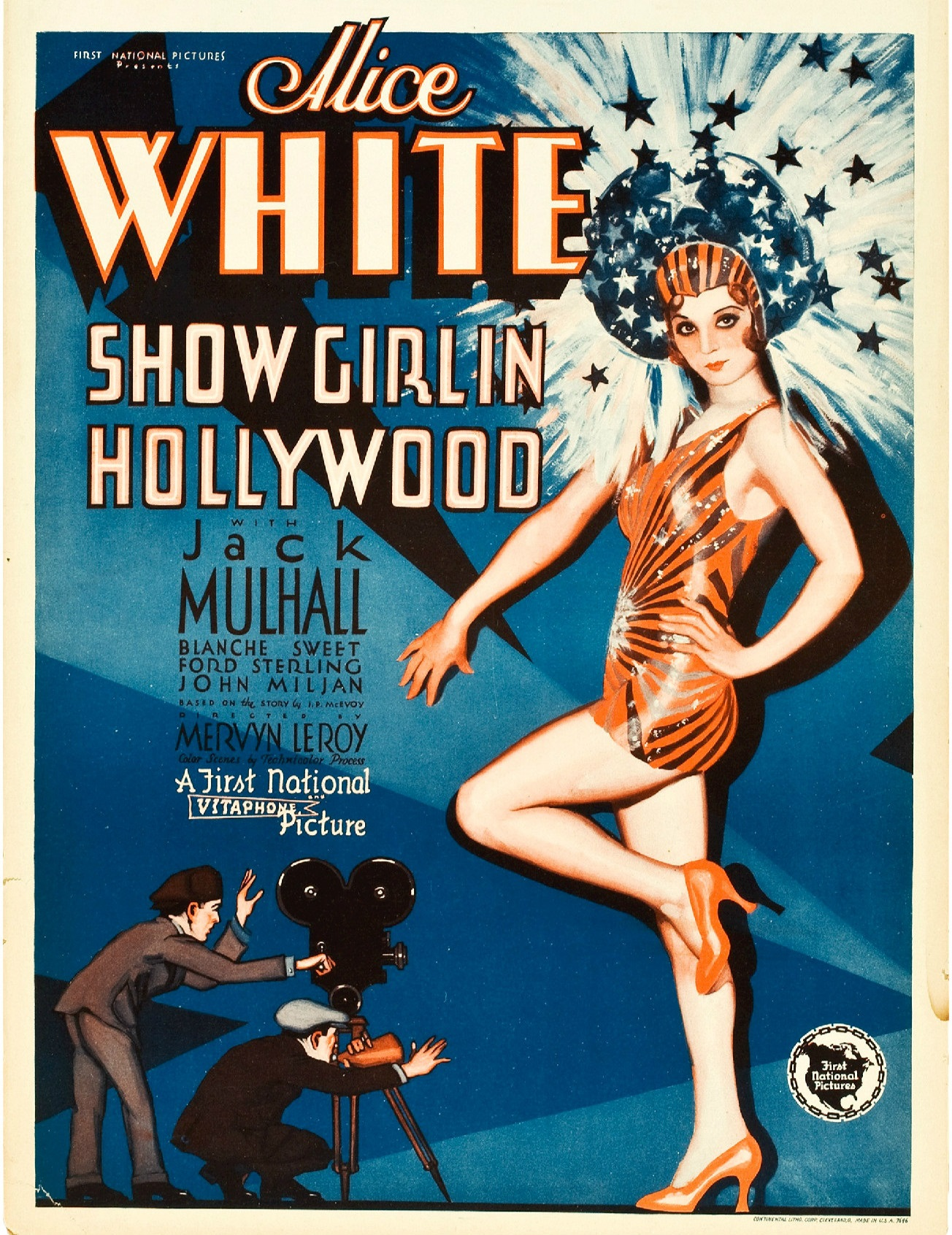
Poster for Show Girl in Hollywood (1930)

Due to the stress of traveling with a pregnant wife and a young son, North turned to making films in 1915. Along with, L. Lawrence Weber, Aaron Hoffman and Harry J. Cohen, North organized Popular Plays and Players, the precursor of Metro Pictures. In 1915 North started to produce Olga Petrova's silent films. He worked as studio manager with George Irving as director in making Petrova's movies. In January 1917 North's Popular Plays and Players, part of the Metro Picture Corporation, was filming in a rented building on West 35th Street, Manhattan, when there was an explosion in the film cutting room. The building filled with dense smoke, and the actors had to grope their ways to the exits. There were no serious injuries, but Petrova said she had lost jewels and clothes worth $25,000. North reported total losses of about $250,000. Other early films were shot in Fort Lee, New Jersey.

Later North moved to California and produced films for United Artists, and then for First National and Columbia. He produced many films in most genres. North produced Paris (1929, First National), a musical play directed by Clarence G. Badger. The film has been lost, but sound discs and sound tapes have been preserved. North produced Wedding Rings (First National), a drama directed by William Beaudine that was released on December 29, 1929.

North worked for the First National and Warner Bros. film studios in the 1930s, and made many feature films. In 1930 he produced Those Who Dance (Warner Bros), another drama directed by Beaudine, and A Notorious Affair (First National) directed by Lloyd Bacon and starring Billie Dove, Basil Rathbone and Kay Francis. That year he also produced Show Girl in Hollywood and Dawn Patrol, directed by Howard Hawks. In 1931 he produced Beaudine's Father's Son starring Leon Janney, Lewis Stone, Irene Rich, John Halliday and Mickey Bennett.

North was an active producer throughout the 1930s and the first half of the 1940s. The Black Room (1935, Columbia) directed by Roy William Neill was the first horror film starring Boris Karloff. He produced the crime drama Penitentiary (1938, Columbia), directed by John Brahm, starring Walter Connolly, John Howard, Jean Parker and Robert Barrat. In 1942 he produced In Old California for Republic Pictures, directed by William C. McGann and starring John Wayne. The following year he produced War of the Wildcats for Republic, also called In Old Oklahoma, directed by Albert S. Rogell and again starring John Wayne. His Someone to Remember (1943, Republic), directed by Curt Siodmak and based on Prodigal's daughter by Ben Ames Williams, was called "an exceptionally good 'B'".

Robert North died in Los Angeles in 1976, aged 92.

== Partial filmography ==
North was a prolific film producer. His work included:

- 1923 Marriage Morals (producer – as Bobby North)
- 1929 Broadway Babies (producer)
- 1929 Paris (producer)
- 1929 The Great Divide (producer)
- 1929 Wedding Rings (producer)
- 1930 A Notorious Affair (producer – uncredited)
- 1930 Bride of the Regiment (associate producer)
- 1930 Bright Lights (associate producer – uncredited)
- 1930 Kismet (producer)
- 1930 The Bad Men (producer)
- 1930 Mothers Cry (producer – uncredited)
- 1930 Show Girl in Hollywood (producer – uncredited)
- 1930 The Dawn Patrol (producer – uncredited)
- 1930 The Girl of the Golden West (producer)
- 1930 Those Who Dance (producer)
- 1931 Father's Son (producer)
- 1933 Fury of the Jungle (producer)
- 1933 Cocktail Hour (associate producer – uncredited)
- 1933 Fog (associate producer – uncredited)
- 1933 The Circus Queen Murder (associate producer – uncredited)
- 1934 Mills of the Gods (producer)
- 1934 Once to Every Woman (producer)
- 1934 The Defense Rests (producer)
- 1934 The Most Precious Thing in Life (producer – uncredited)
- 1934 Whirlpool (supervising producer – uncredited)
- 1935 Let's Live Tonight (producer)
- 1935 The Lone Wolf Returns (producer)
- 1935 Too Tough to Kill (producer)
- 1935 The Black Room (producer)
- 1936 Dangerous Intrigue (producer – uncredited)
- 1936 Devil's Squadron (associate producer)
- 1936 Pride of the Martines (executive producer – uncredited)
- 1936 Roaming Lady (executive producer – uncredited)
- 1936 You May Be Next (executive producer)
- 1937 Night of Mystery (producer – uncredited)
- 1937 The Crime Nobody Saw (executive producer – uncredited)
- 1938 Penitentiary (producer)
- 1939 Main Street Lawyer (associate producer)
- 1939 Thou Shalt Not Kill (associate producer)
- 1940 Behind the News (producer)
- 1940 Forgotten Girls (associate producer)
- 1940 Gangs of Chicago (producer)
- 1940 Girl from Havana (producer)
- 1940 Meet the Missus (producer)
- 1940 Melody and Moonlight (producer)
- 1940 Sing, Dance, Plenty Hot (associate producer)
- 1940 The Crooked Road (producer)
- 1940 Wolf of New York (associate producer)
- 1941 Hurricane Smith (associate producer)
- 1941 Ice-Capades (associate producer)
- 1941 Petticoat Politics (producer)
- 1941 Public Enemies (associate producer)
- 1941 Sis Hopkins (associate producer)
- 1941 The Gay Vagabond (producer)
- 1942 A Tragedy at Midnight (associate producer)
- 1942 Ice-Capades Revue (associate producer)
- 1942 In Old California (associate producer)
- 1942 Yokel Boy (associate producer)
- 1943 In Old Oklahoma (associate producer)
- 1943 Someone to Remember (associate producer)
- 1944 Brazil (associate producer)
- 1946 Earl Carroll Sketchbook (associate producer)
