= Gun Town =

1946 film

- Directed by: Wallace Fox
- Written by: William Lively
- Produced by: Wallace Fox
- Starring: Kirby Grant; Claire Carleton; Lyle Talbot
- Cinematography: Maury Gertsman
- Edited by: Ray Snyder
- Music by: Mark Levant
- Production company: Universal Pictures
- Distributed by: Universal Pictures
- Release date: January 18, 1946
- Running time: 55 minutes
- Country: United States
- Language: English

Gun Town is a 1946 American Western film directed by Wallace Fox and starring Kirby Grant, Claire Carleton and Lyle Talbot.

== Cast ==
- Kirby Grant as Kip Lewis
- Fuzzy Knight as Ivory
- Lyle Talbot as Lucky Dorgan
- Claire Carleton as Belle Townley
- Louise Currie as Buckskin Jane Sawyer
- Gene Garrick as Davie Sawyer
- Earle Hodgins as Sheriff
- Ray Bennett as Nevada - Henchman
- Dan White as Joe - Henchman

== Bibliography ==
- Blottner, Gene. Universal Sound Westerns, 1929-1946: The Complete Filmography. McFarland & Company, 2003.
