= Maisie Conceicao =

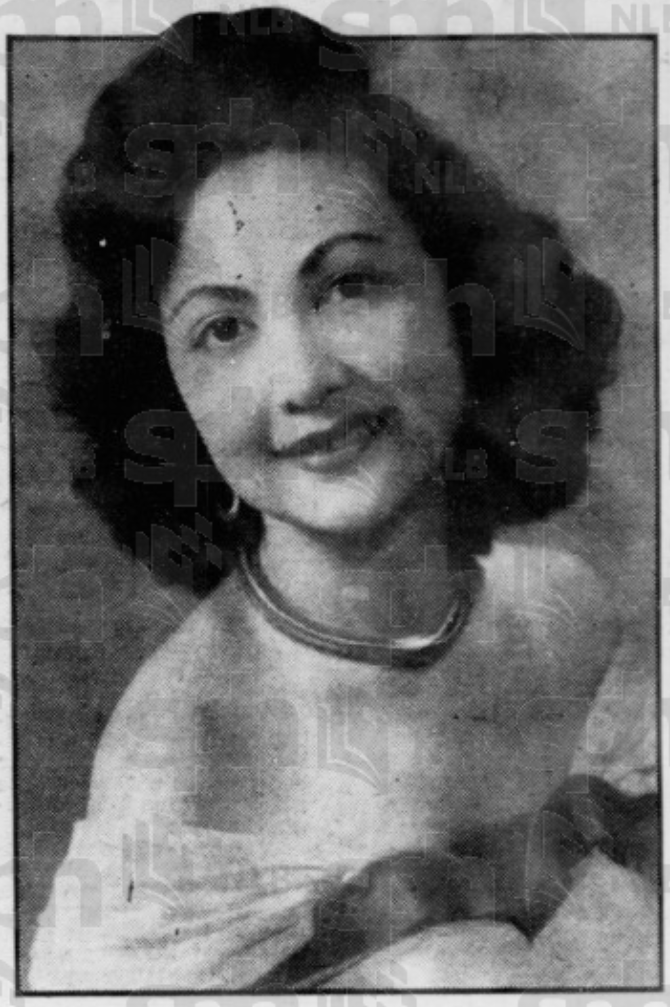
Conceicao in 1952

Maisie Theresa Conceicao (née Marcus; born 22 December 1923) was a prominent singer and disc jockey in Singapore in the 1950s before she left for the United States, where she became a librarian. She was known for hosting Calling All Hospitals radio programme in Singapore.

== Early life and education ==
Conceicao was a Eurasian, being of Malaysian, Chinese and Portuguese descent. She came from a "family of music lovers". Her father was M. L. Marcus, the owner of an advertising agency on Malacca Street. She received her education at the Convent of the Holy Infant Jesus. Shortly before the Japanese Occupation of Singapore, which lasted from 1942 to 1945, Conceicao fled to Ceylon with her sisters. They then travelled to Bangalore in India. However, she then split off from her sisters, who went elsewhere in India while she joined the Women's Auxiliary Corps, briefly remaining in Bangalore before being posted to New Delhi.

== Career ==
In 1944, while Conceicao was with the Women's Auxiliary Corps, she began to sing "in earnest". She first participated in "community sing-songs" and then at camp concerts. She was soon "singled out" for singing to others within the military. Conceicao returned to Singapore following the end of World War II and began working for a local insurance firm. By May 1950, she had been working as a Record Library Assistant at Radio Malaya in Singapore for two years. In that year, Kingsley Morrando, her superior at Radio Malaya, had been searching for a crooner to sing two Doris Day numbers, the songs It's a Great Feeling and Someone Like You, at screenings of the musical comedy film It's a Great Feeling at the Capitol Theatre. After failing to find a suitable vocalist, Morrando, "half kidding", asked Conceicao if she could sing. When she told him that she could, he brought her over to a studio where she sang Again, at which point he "knew she was the girl [he] had been looking for." The film gave her her "break".

After It's a Great Feeling, Conceicao began singing for troops stationed at the local military bases, such as Tengah Air Base, the Seletar Camp and the Singapore Naval Base. She also appeared on the Radio Malaya programme Evening Stars. Conceicao played a leading role in Vernon Martinus's Show Business, a variety show staged in aid of the Dr. Patricia Elliot Memorial Fund at the Victoria Theatre on 4 April 1951. Due to the show's popularity, a repeat performance was held again at the Victoria Theatre on 27 April. On 13 August 1952, Conceicao appeared on television for the radio exhibition at the Happy World Amusement Park. She also performed in Martinus's Show Business, 1952, held in aid of the Singapore Girls' Sports Club at the Victoria Theatre on 27 and 28 August. By June 1955, Conceicao had become the host of the Radio Malaya programme Calling All Hospitals. She continued to host the programme, which catered towards ill individuals, until 28 November 1959, shortly before she left Singapore.

By May 1962, Conceicao had been working in the main library circulation department at the Dayton and Montgomery County Public Library. Following the opening of the library's Huber Heights branch, she was appointed the branch's library assistant. On 1 June 1970, Conceicao began working as a clerical assistant IIA at the John M. Pfau Library of the California State University in San Bernardino, California. She eventually became the library's head of monograph cataloguing before retiring on 1 July 2006.

== Personal life ==
Conceicao's siblings included civil servant P. C. Marcus and Dr. Carl Marcus, the Chief Health Officer of the Singapore General Hospital. She could speak three other languages in addition to English and her accent was described by Maggie Fitzgibbons of the Dayton Daily News as a "pleasing blend of Spanish, French, English and Malayan."

Conceicao married Dudley L. Conceicao in November 1948 at the Cathedral of the Good Shepherd in Singapore. She gave birth to a son in 1949. Conceicao left Singapore with her family on 4 December 1959 to settle in Dayton, Ohio. The couple had made the decision to leave due to local Anti-Eurasian sentiments. They had emigrated to America with the help of an Air Force colonel stationed at the Wright-Patterson Air Force Base.
