= The Crooked Road (1940 film) =

1940 film by Phil Rosen

- Theatrical release poster
- Directed by: Phil Rosen
- Screenplay by: Richard Blake; Joseph Krumgold; Garnett Weston
- Story by: Richard Blake
- Produced by: Robert North
- Starring: Edmund Lowe; Irene Hervey; Henry Wilcoxon; Paul Fix; Arthur Loft; Claire Carleton
- Cinematography: Ernest Miller
- Edited by: Ernest J. Nims
- Music by: William Lava
- Production company: Republic Pictures
- Distributed by: Republic Pictures
- Release date: May 10, 1940
- Running time: 66 minutes
- Country: United States
- Language: English

The Crooked Road is a 1940 American drama film directed by Phil Rosen and written by Richard Blake, Joseph Krumgold and Garnett Weston. The film stars Edmund Lowe, Irene Hervey, Henry Wilcoxon, Paul Fix, Arthur Loft and Claire Carleton. The film was released on May 10, 1940, by Republic Pictures.

== Cast ==
- Edmund Lowe as Danny Driscoll / John Vincent / George Atwater
- Irene Hervey as Louise Dalton
- Henry Wilcoxon as Bob Trent
- Paul Fix as Nick Romero
- Arthur Loft as Carl Gobel
- Claire Carleton as Virgie Gobel
- Charles Lane as Phil Wesner
