= Quantum International =

Defunct American company

Quantum International was a US-based direct response television company specialized in the creation of infomercial programming around the world. The company operated its services under the Quantum and Sell-A-Vision brands for television stations.

== History ==
The company was founded in the mid-80s by entrepreneur Kevin Harrington, an infomercial pioneer, who owned it until he sold his shares to create the Home Shopping Network. By 1990, it was trading as Quantum International Marketing, and had a US office in Fort Washington, Pennsylvania. The company was headquartered in London. The company was acquired by National Media Corporation in 1991.

The company had several distributors around the world. In Israel, the distributor was Modaphone, based in Tel Aviv, while in Singapore, it was represented by Mail Order Gallery until 1994, when the franchisee was given over to LeisureMart Pte Ltd. In March 1993, it inked a deal with Televisa subsidiary Univisa to distribute its products; while in May, it announced a deal with Flextech to create an infomercial channel that would broadcast 55 hours a week by satellite across the UK and Europe. In July, its programming was made available on the Italia 7 network.

Quantum signed two deals (for one-hour programs) with Japanese TV stations (Niigata TV 21 and RKB Mainichi) to increase its market presence in December 1994. Up until then, its carriage was limited to infomercial programs carried on TV Tokyo in the Kanto area. In March 1996, it signed an agreement with Televisión y Ventas to carry infomercials for its products on Ecuadorian channels Gamavisión and Telesistema. That same month, it supplied its infomercial strands to Sci-Fi Channel UK under the Nova Shop brand. In June, it announced the launch of Q24 (Quantum 24), a full-time infomercial channel for Europe, using the Hot Bird satellite. The company hoped to reach ten million potential viewers by year-end 1997. Most of the infomercials seen on international services were repackages of the original US infomercial, which were later tailored for individual local markets based on local preferences. The Q24 channel launched in late June 1996, facing capacity problems in most of the markets it was going to launch, as well as competition from rival services, such as the British version of QVC. In November, the company set up agreements with Shenzhen Television and Guangdong Cable through a new subsidiary for mainland China, and would eventually branch out into Hong Kong from July 1997.

On October 20, 2000, Quantum North America (dba e4l) filed for Chapter 11 bankruptcy, while its British subsidiary Quantum International was seeking administration. In March 2001, e4l agreed to sell its assets in the Asia-Pacific region
