= It's a Great Feeling =

1949 film by David Butler

- Theatrical release poster
- Directed by: David Butler
- Screenplay by: Jack Rose; Mel Shavelson
- Story by: I. A. L. Diamond
- Produced by: Alex Gottlieb
- Starring: Dennis Morgan; Doris Day; Jack Carson
- Cinematography: Wilfred M. Cline
- Edited by: Irene Morra
- Music by: Jule Styne
- Distributed by: Warner Bros. Pictures
- Release date: August 20, 1949
- Running time: 85 minutes
- Country: United States
- Language: English
- Budget: $1,452,000
- Box office: $2,713,000

It's a Great Feeling is a 1949 American Technicolor musical comedy film directed by David Butler and starring Dennis Morgan, Doris Day, and Jack Carson in a parody of what goes on behind the scenes in Hollywood filmmaking. The screenplay by Jack Rose and Mel Shavelson was based on a story by I. A. L. Diamond. The film was produced by Alex Gottlieb and distributed by Warner Bros. Pictures.

It's a Great Feeling was Day's third film (and her third and last pairing with Carson, following Romance on the High Seas and My Dream Is Yours) and the first to bring her widespread notice. It's a Great Feeling is a "Who's Who?" of Hollywood in its heyday and glorified the studio system at the peak of its golden age.

== Plot ==
Film directors Raoul Walsh, King Vidor, Michael Curtiz, and David Butler all refuse to helm producer Arthur Trent's new Warner Bros. film Mademoiselle Fifi, starring Dennis Morgan and Jack Carson, because of Carson's huge ego. Frustrated, Trent assigns Carson to direct the film himself. Carson pleads with Morgan to do the film with him as he is broke, but Morgan has been offered a Broadway show and wants to accept it. One day, studio commissary waitress and aspiring actress Judy Adams wangles her way into Carson's dressing room, forcing him to let her audition for him. Carson promises Judy a part in his film if she can convince Morgan to sign a contract with him.

Posing as Carson's secret, pregnant wife, Judy goes to Morgan's dressing room and concocts a sad story that convinces him to sign the contract. Shortly afterwards, however, Carson reneges on his promise to Judy, and Morgan discovers the ruse. Feeling betrayed, Judy storms off after announcing that she is taking the next train back to her hometown of Goerke's Corners, Wisconsin. With no other actresses willing to work with Carson, Morgan suggests that they cast an unknown who is unaware of Carson's reputation, and Judy is the first person that comes to mind. Carson and Morgan rush to the train station to find Judy before she leaves, but Judy has become disillusioned with Hollywood. After running into Danny Kaye, both men convince Judy that they can make her a star.

Carson and Morgan start by dressing Judy as a film star in order to impress Trent. At a fancy dress shop, Joan Crawford suspects that Judy is being taken advantage of and slaps both men. Knowing that Trent likes to discover his own talent, Carson and Morgan constantly place him in proximity to Judy, who poses as an elevator operator, a waitress, a taxi driver, and an oculist's assistant, hoping that Trent will notice her. However, all Trent keeps seeing is a pretty blonde with a goofy smile and blinking eyes. Morgan, feeling hopeless, discourages Judy from becoming an actress, but she is now determined to succeed, explaining how hard she has worked to afford acting and singing lessons. Meanwhile, both men compete over discovering Judy as well as her romantic attention.

When Carson and Morgan attempt to arrange a screen test for Judy, Trent bars Carson from the Warner Bros. lot, but Edward G. Robinson helps him sneak in. In the studio, they convince a reluctant Ray Heindorf to record Judy performing the song "That Was a Big Fat Lie". Carson then directs Judy and Morgan in a screen test, which undergoes technical difficulties. When seeing the screen test, Trent has a nervous breakdown and cancels Mademoiselle Fifi. As a last resort, Carson and Morgan disguise Judy as a famous French film star with dark hair named Yvonne Amour. At a grand reception for "Yvonne", Judy tumbles off the stage and loses her wig during a performance of "At the Cafe Rendezvous", exposing the ruse.

Carson and Morgan go to Judy's apartment, and before they can inform her that the film is canceled again, they meet Grace, Judy's roommate and fellow commissary waitress. Grace convinces Carson and Morgan that Judy would be much happier returning home to Goerke's Corners and marrying her long-time boyfriend Jeffrey Bushdinkle instead of pursuing an uncertain career in Hollywood. Judy overhears the two men promising to make her downstairs neighbor, Irene, a star. Infuriated, Judy leaves and takes the next train to Goerke's Corners. Trent, who is on the same train, realizes Judy's talent after hearing her singing and offers her a career in pictures, but she is tired of being deceived and slaps him.

Trent sends a telegram to Carson and Morgan telling them that Mademoiselle Fifi is back in production and that he wants Judy to star in it. Carson and Morgan rush to Goerke's Corners to share the news with Judy. They arrive just as Judy's wedding is starting, and decide to let her lead a small-town life. The two men are stunned to find that her groom, Jeffrey Bushdinkle, looks exactly like Errol Flynn.

== Cast ==
- Dennis Morgan as himself
- Doris Day as Judy Adams
- Jack Carson as himself
- Bill Goodwin as Arthur Trent
- Irving Bacon as information clerk
- Claire Carleton as Grace
- The Famous Mazzone-Abbott Dancers
- Errol Flynn as Jeffrey Bushdinkle (uncredited)
- Frank Cady as oculist (uncredited)
- Pat Flaherty as Charlie, studio gate guard (uncredited)
- Sandra Gould as train passenger in upper berth (uncredited)
- James Holden as soda jerk (uncredited)
- Georges Renavent as Andre Bernet (uncredited)
- Olan Soule as flack (uncredited)
- Nita Talbot as model (uncredited)

=== Cameos ===
Many of the studio's most popular stars and directors make uncredited cameo appearances throughout the film. Among them are:

- Raoul Walsh
- King Vidor
- Michael Curtiz
- David Butler
- Gary Cooper
- Ronald Reagan
- Sydney Greenstreet
- Jane Wyman
- Danny Kaye
- Joan Crawford
- Edward G. Robinson
- Ray Heindorf
- Bugs Bunny voiced by Mel Blanc
- Patricia Neal
- Eleanor Parker

Reagan and Wyman's daughter Maureen also makes an appearance in a scene with her mother.

== Production ==
The film's working title was Two Guys and a Gal. The film resembled Day's early career as a waitress struggling to get into the pictures and nearly landing her big break when prepared to leave Hollywood. It's a Great Feeling was Day's third film and third-to-last collaboration with Carson. On working with him, Day wrote in her autobiography:

He helped me enormously with my technical indoctrination into movie acting. He taught me dozens of tricks about how to move to precise camera marks without actually looking for them, how to handle myself in close-ups so that my face or profile rather than the back of my head would be in a shot, how to sustain the evenness of a performed scene. ... Since we were also going together, we'd often discuss some of these things in the evening, and there's no doubt that my relationship with Jack helped me considerably in my early going.

In June 1948, Day's participation in the film was confirmed. By that time, Carson and Morgan were already cast. The film also went under the title Two Guys of the Nineties and, due to insistence of Carson and Morgan as Two Guys from Hollywood (though Morgan had previously stated in an interview that he would never star in another film with "Two Guys" in the title).

== Musical numbers ==
- "At the Cafe Rendezvous"
- "That Was a Big Fat Lie"
- "Blame My Absent-Minded Heart"
- "Fiddle Dee Dee"
- "Give Me a Song with a Beautiful Melody"
- "There's Nothing Rougher Than Love"
- "It's a Great Feeling"

== Reception ==
=== Box office ===
According to Warner Bros. records, the film earned $2,059,000 domestically and $654,000 in overseas markets. Variety listed the film as a box office disappointment.

=== Critical response ===
Variety commented: "Joan Crawford (as herself) does a pip of a bit in a swank gown shop with the three principals, rating plenty of howls." In his book on Doris Day's career, author Tom Santopietro writes that the Crawford's self-parody of her "notoriously dramatic" screen image is the funniest bit in the film. Crawford supposedly overhears Jack Carson and Dennis Morgan discussing Doris Day and thinks they are taking advantage of her. She automatically launches into a clichéd, melodramatic speech typical of her screen persona (in this case, from Mildred Pierce) and furiously slaps both Jack Carson and Dennis Morgan. Carson asks "What's that for?" and Crawford smiles, shrugs and says: "I do that in all my pictures!"

=== Accolades ===
The title tune "It's a Great Feeling" (written by Jule Styne and Sammy Cahn), received an Academy Award nomination for Best Song.
