= It's a Great Feeling (song) =

"It's a Great Feeling" is a popular song.

The music was written by Jule Styne, the lyrics by Sammy Cahn. The song was published in 1949.

The song was introduced in the film of the same name by Doris Day and the song was nominated for the Academy Award for Best Original Song in 1950 but lost out to “Baby, It's Cold Outside”.

Both Doris Day (recorded May 1949 for Columbia Records, catalog 38517) and Kay Starr made commercial recordings of the song but neither reached the charts.
