= Talentime (contest) =

Singaporean talent competition

Talentime was a Singaporean talent competition held by what is now Mediacorp. It was first held in 1949 on radio (under Radio Malaya Singapore) and 1967 on television (under Radio Television Singapore). The privatisation of SBC caused a halt, reviving only in 2001 for one season.

== History ==
The idea started floating in January 1949 following the results of a Radio Malaya Singapore survey. The name was announced later that month and its first edition was held on 18 February of that year at the British Council Hall. Kingsley Morrando was active from the first series. Forty entertainers showed their interest in joining. The winner of the first edition was crooner Freddie Jansen. Talentime was recorded on Friday and was broadcast on radio the following Monday. The finals of the first series took place on 27 April; the winner was Larry Fenton.

The second series was intended to begin on 3 June 1949, but due to "unforeseen circumstances", it was delayed to 17 June. A Tamil edition was also in the plans by the Tamil Brotherhood Association of Singapore in August; this version took place on 26 August at Farrer Park with existing Talentime staff. The huge success in Singapore alone caused Morrando to extend its scope to the Federation of Malaya, establishing centres in Kuala Lumpur and Penang for this purpose. The local edition was first held in Malacca on 11 September.

Within less than a year, the word "talentime" began to be used to refer to talent contests, regardless or not of their affiliation with the radio Talentime, such as the Tamil version. An international version was planned in June 1950, to be held at the Great World Park.

In 1967, Talentime jumped to television; the first televised final aired on 29 February 1968. There were two music categories: popular and serious music. Before the 1969 edition, the serious music category was removed. 1977 saw the highest number of entries received: 250,000. Ratings increased in the 1988 edition with 219,000 viewers watching its finals, compared to 103.000 in 1986.

By 1991, as of the time of the latest Chinese edition (on Channel 8), its popularity eroded due to the rise in local actors and actresses, as well as karaoke. This also impacted its rules; as of that edition, its top prize fell to SG$11,000 (down from its peak of SG$100,000). SBC's priority was now Star Search.

Mediacorp announced that it would revive Talentime in 2001, intended to competing against The Big Break on TVWorks. Channel 5 executives hopes that the winner could be "the next Sammi Cheng, or the next Backstreet Boys". The revival was panned; after the first quarter-finals on 14 October, Straits Times author Lionel Seah described it as "a one-hour, glorified karaoke session, with prizes in place of the alcohol".
