= Claude Doral =

Singaporean radio personality, actor and broadcaster

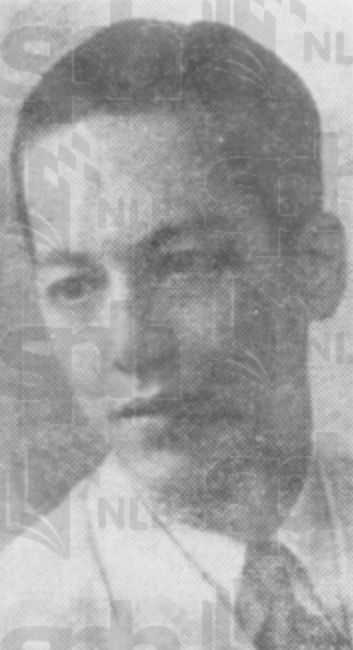
Doral in 1948

Claudius V. Doral (1923 – 24 September 1996), better known as Claude Doral, was a Singaporean radio personality, actor and broadcaster. He later served as the Director of Broadcasting (Programmes) at Radio and Television Singapore until his retirement in 1972.

== Early life and education ==
Doral was born in Singapore in 1923. He was of Eurasian descent. He studied at the Saint Patrick's School, from which he graduated at age 14. He then began attending Raffles College but the Japanese Occupation of Singapore interrupted his studies. During the occupation, he broadcast to Allied headquarters elsewhere in Southeast Asia from the Cathay Building on the conditions of the prisoner-of-war and internment camps in Singapore.

== Career ==
When the British returned to Singapore in 1945, Doral was "engaged immediately" at Radio Malaya. By November 1948, he was a newsreader, a presenter of several of Radio Malaya's programmes, a programme assistant for broadcasts to English schools and occasionally an actor in radio plays for the schools. "Nan Hall" of The Singapore Free Press noted then that Doral was not officially an announcer as the station did not have official announcers. All of the station's broadcasters had "full-time office jobs that contribute[d] to the building and arrangement of programmes". Hall noted that they "broadcast[ed] in what [was] laughingly referred to as only their spare time." In December, he was elected the honorary editor of the newly-formed Singapore Broadcasting Employees Union, which by then had over 300 members. Doral and Islay Attenborough served as the assistant producers to the programme series Saturday Night at Eight, which began airing on the station's Blue Network on 23 April 1949. He played a part in the Radio Malaya adaptation of The Rime of the Ancient Mariner, which aired on 29 January 1950.

In June 1951, Doral was transferred over to Radio Malaya's Penang division as a programme assistant. Oswald Henry of The Singapore Standard reported that he had been a "popular figure in Singapore radio circles." By June 1952, he had instead been transferred over to the station's Kuala Lumpur division, where he had begun serving as a sportscaster, covering the Thomas Cup and the International badminton championships. His commentary was broadcast across Malaya. Ken Jalleh of The Singapore Standard reported that Doral "was the most popular voice" and that he "did not miss a single thrill and his listeners missed nothing." Jalleh claimed that the Standard had received letters "from all over Malaya, and as far as Sarawak and Borneo", which were "all in praise of Radio Malaya and Claude Doral." By then, he had also had parts in several radio plays. He acted as a demon in the Malayan Arts Theatre's production of Tobias and the Angel, staged at the Kuala Lumpur Town Hall from 10 to 14 March 1953. In July 1954, it was announced that Doral would be leaving for Britain on a six-month-long staff training course, becoming the fourth Radio Malaya employee to receive this opportunity. The Singapore Free Press then reported that he was "well-known to Radio Malaya listeners for his running commentaries on sport." From 14 July to 11 August, he attended a vocational course at the University of Cambridge and he was a guest of the British Council for the first three months of the trip. After this, he spent the remainder of the trip with the BBC. He returned to Singapore at the end of December.

Doral acted as Joe Borah in the "well-received" Radio Malaya comedy series Towkay's Tavern which began airing in mid-1955. He also commentated for the Singapore Amateur Boxing Championships held around the same time. The Straits Times radio critic opined that Doral was "barely audible thanks to the vociferous comments of his near neighbours." He then covered the Malayan athletic championships in August. However, his commentary "provoked some hard-hitting criticism from listeners", with letters published in Radio Weekly, The Straits Times and The Sunday Times accusing him of "displaying an appalling ignorance of everything connected with amateur athletics." The following month, it was announced that Doral would be covering the 1956 Summer Olympics, held in Melbourne, Australia from November to December, for Radio Malaya. "Mike Watcher", despite having heavily criticised Doral's commentary for the Malayan athletic championships, opined that Doral "[would] make a success" of covering the Olympics, writing that Doral is "normally able to give, perhaps not inspired commentaries, but certainly sound workmanlike broadcasts on a sport with which he is familiar." Doral's first broadcast from Melbourne was an interview with an official, which "Mike Watcher" was "not happy with". However, "Mike Watcher" later opined that after a "somewhat shakey start", Doral was "making a good job of a very difficult task" considering his "lack of experience".

Doral had become the English Programmes manager of Radio Malaya by June 1957. The following year, he became the producer for the Radio Malaya adaptation of A.J.C. Pelham-Groom's stories following A.S.P. Latiff bin Ismail. In December 1959, he provided the commentary for the station's coverage of Yusof Ishak's installation as president. He then covered the 1960 Summer Olympics, held in Rome. In August 1961, Doral left for the United States on a four month-long cultural exchange programme and study tour sponsored by the United States government, during which he was to attend seminars at the Syracuse University and the Purdue University, as well as to visit TV centres across the country. By December 1962, he had become the assistant controller of commercial programmes at the station, which had been renamed Radio Singapore in 1959. Doral narrated Television Looks at Singapore, the first film shown on TV Singapura, which began operating in early 1963. He had by then been made the Controller of Programmes. In this period, he hosted the programmes Sports Parade and What Others Say. He also provided the commentary for the 1958 Asian Games and the 1962 Asian Games. Doral was appointed the Director of Programmes by September 1965. He provided the commentary for the Asian Games in 1970. Doral officially retired from Radio and Television Singapore in March 1972. However, he continued to write scripts and do voice-overs for commercials for the station.

== Personal life and death ==
Doral also went by "Johan Abdullah". His "strong points" were badminton, boxing and athletics. By November 1948, Doral was studying law "for relaxation". He married Hanim Zain, with whom he had two daughters and a son. In the 1980s, he suffered three strokes, though he reportedly remained "very active and independent." On 22 September 1996, he suffered a stroke and was taken to the Singapore General Hospital, where he fell into a coma. He died on 24 September.
