= Vernon Martinus =

Ballet dancer and choreographer

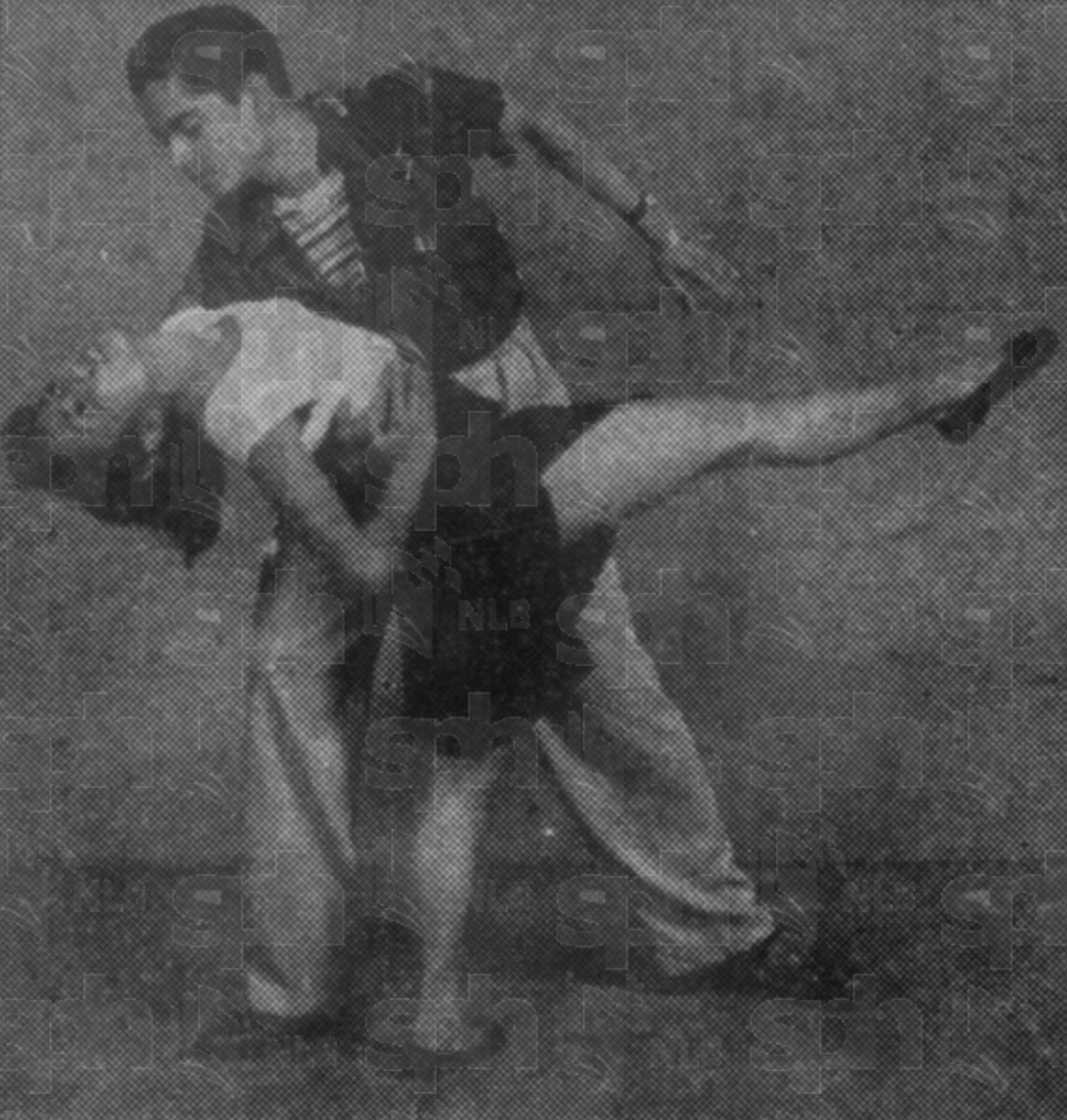
Martinus dancing with Rose Eberwein in The Legend of Frankie and Johnnie as part of Show Business in August 1952

Vernon Philip Martinus (19 August 1932 – September 2022) was a ballet dancer and choreographer in Singapore. He produced and performed in Show Business, a series of popular musical variety shows staged in the 1950s, and co-led the Frances School of Dancing with his wife, ballet dancer Frances Poh. In 1958, the school merged with the Malaya School of Ballet to form the Singapore Ballet Academy. Martinus also founded, directed, and choreographed for the Singapore Ballet Company, a non-profit ballet group active in the late 1950s and early 1960s.

In 1963, he joined the newly established Television Singapura as a producer, where he was involved in initiating several programmes. He stated that he produced the programme on which Prime Minister Lee Kuan Yew announced Singapore's separation from Malaysia.

== Early life and education ==
Martinus was born in Singapore on 19 August 1932 to William Clarence Martinus and Evelyn Gauder. His father was the bandleader of the Sambodians Orchestra, a popular local musical group. He was of Eurasian descent and was educated at Saint Andrew's School.

By June 1940, Martinus had begun studying music at the Far Eastern Music School in Singapore, founded by Marcelo Anciano. In June 1949, he took part in Radio Malaya's Talentime, a talent competition, where he performed a piano duet with Derrick Newman.

== Career ==
=== Radio and Show Business (1950–1956) ===
After completing his schooling, Martinus obtained his first job in 1950 at the Pan-Malayan Department of Broadcasting, located in the Cathay Building, as a record library assistant. The following year, his cousin Norma Sheffield, on behalf of her mother, invited him to organise a variety show in aid of the Dr. Patricia Elliot Memorial Fund for children at the St. Andrew's Mission Hospital. The project was supported by St. Hilda's Church on Ceylon Road, which initially planned to host the programme at its church hall.

The musical variety show, titled Show Business, was staged at the Victoria Theatre on 4 April. It featured local singer Maisie Conceicao in a leading role, alongside Sheffield, vocalist Barbara Deans, magician Tan Hock Chuan, Larry Fenton and his Tin Can Toledos, and singer Bunny Gregory. Many of the performers lacked prior stage experience, and the cast was predominantly Eurasian. Martinus described the production as his "first effort at producing on a large scale." In addition to producing, he acted and choreographed the sketch Slaughter on Tenth Avenue, which a Singapore Free Press critic considered the show's best act, remarking that Martinus had "nailed his colours soundly to the mast."

The event was considered a success, with more than 100 people reportedly turned away. A repeat performance was staged on 27 April, again at the Victoria Theatre and in aid of the Dr. Patricia Elliot Memorial Fund. The second show also sold out several days in advance.

Martinus remained with Radio Malaya for just over a year before leaving to join Rediffusion Singapore, where he was offered a salary twice that of his previous position. In 1952, he produced Show Business, 1952, which he described as a "bigger, brighter and better show." Held at the Victoria Theatre on 27 and 28 August in aid of the Girls Sports Club Building Fund, the production's highlight was a full-length performance of the ballet Frankie and Johnny, which had not previously been staged in Singapore. Martinus danced in the ballet alongside Rose Eberwein and Deans. Returning performers included Conceicao, Fenton, and Tan, with new additions such as Barbara Aeria, caricaturist Laddie Duckworth, and singer Douglas Gomes. Deans also performed the lead in The Man from Cuba, another full-length dance piece. The show included acrobatic acts, and the Singapore Free Press described it as "one of the brightest musicals presented in the Colony this year."

Both performances sold out, generating a profit of $2,001.50. The two shows drew nearly 1,000 audience members, with hundreds reportedly turned away. Despite requests for an additional performance, the venue was unavailable for several months. By 1953, Martinus had been appointed English Programmes Manager at Rediffusion Singapore. He received no formal training for the role, which also involved managing staff. No Show Business production was staged that year.

In 1954, Martinus produced Show Business, 1954, described as his "biggest and most ambitious" production to date. Staged at the Victoria Theatre from 17 to 20 June, with an additional matinee on 20 June, the show was in aid of the Girls Sports Club. Featuring a cast of more than 100, the production consisted of four song-and-dance segments comprising 18 numbers, all choreographed by Martinus. Performers included Miss Malaya contestants Phyllis Westerhout and Corrine Siddons, singer Leslie Rozario, the Manasseh Sisters, Ronald Alcantra, and Maureen Clarke, with Sheffield and Aeria returning from previous years. Vernon Palmer served as stage manager. Each night sold out, raising a profit of $4,808.96. A Straits Times critic described it as "another step forward" for Martinus, praising the sets and presentation.

Martinus did not produce further Show Business productions. Writer Denyse Tessensohn later described the series as having left "legacies to Singapore theatre and music [that] are incalculable and will be remembered."

In October 1954, Martinus appeared in his first non-musical role in the Stage Club's production of Noël Coward's Relative Values at the Victoria Memorial Hall. That year, he also began taking ballet lessons at the Maudrene Yap Dancing School, though Maudrene Yap later noted that he often missed classes for extended periods. In August 1955, Martinus and Palmer worked as stage managers for Magic Carpet, staged at the Capitol Cinema by the Singapore branch of the British Red Cross Society.

=== Singapore Ballet Academy and the Singapore Ballet Company (1957–1962) ===
Martinus made his debut as a ballet dancer in Time to Dance, staged on 25 and 26 January 1957 at the Singapore Badminton Hall in aid of the Deaf and Dumb School fund. The production was organised by his wife, Frances Poh, a teacher at the Maudrene Yap Dancing School. In February, it was announced that Martinus would leave Rediffusion Singapore in April to study modern musical comedy and dance in England. Mike Ellery, formerly of Radio Malaya, was appointed to replace him as English programmes manager from 1 March. Martinus had personally recommended Ellery for the position, stating that Ellery had more experience than he did.

Before leaving, Martinus and Poh, under the banner of Frances-Vernon Productions, presented On Stage, a production comprising two plays and several ballet numbers, which opened at the Victoria Memorial Hall on 10 April. By October, Martinus had been accepted into the Royal Ballet School of Sadler Wells for a one-year programme and had already passed the examinations of the International Dancing Masters' Association. Poh also left for England to study dance. Martinus studied under dancer and pedagogue Marie Rambert, completing his Royal Academy of Dance examinations earlier than expected.

The couple returned to Singapore in January 1958, intending to establish a non-profit ballet group to "make Singaporeans ballet-minded". They had already raised $700 through a performance staged in Britain prior to their return. Martinus planned to lead the group while Poh continued to head the Frances School of Dancing. Both resumed teaching at the school the following month.

In April 1958, the Frances School of Dancing merged with the Malaya School of Ballet to form the Singapore Ballet Academy. The academy operated from a new building on Peck Hay Road, with Martinus as director and Poh as ballet principal. The teaching staff included former Malaya School of Ballet co-principals Soonee Goh and Blossom Shek, and Frances School teacher Florrie Tait. who was a teacher at the Frances School. It was the first school in Malaya to offer full-time training in ballet, stage dancing, costuming, and stage makeup, similar to the programmes of large ballet schools in Britain.

Martinus and Poh presented a ballet performance at the Canning Rise Cultural Centre on 2–4 May, featuring 25 senior dancers from the academy, pianist Ricardo Anciano, and Design for Dancers, a new ballet choreographed by Martinus. Proceeds were allocated to the planned ballet group.

By August, Martinus had established the Singapore Ballet Company, comprising 30 female and 12 male dancers, all senior ballet students from the Colony. Members included Jean Chew, Goh Lay Kuan, Tan Hock Lye, Tan Swee Leong, and Francis Yeoh. The company was directed and choreographed by Martinus, did not charge fees, and was funded through performance proceeds. Its inaugural production ran from 14 to 20 August 1958 at the Canning Rise Cultural Centre, featuring Martinus, Poh, Soonee Goh, Elaine Vine, Tait, and Tan Hock Lye in principal roles. The production was described as "one of the fullest and most ambitious ballet ventures yet seen in Malaya."

In 1959, the company's second season opened on 24 April at the Victoria Theatre, with Goh Soo Khim as the prima ballerina. The Straits Times praised Martinus's Ming Toi as "most original and effective", though described his performance as "polished" but "too restrained". The third season, staged from 20 to 30 August, included the Southeast Asian premiere of Western Symphony, Act II of Swan Lake and the premiere of Passions. alongside Don Quixote pas de deux, Bluebird Pas de Deux, Design for Dancers, Winter Frolic, and Polovtsian Dances from Prince Igor. Martinus and Poh danced as Prince Siegfried and Princess Odette in Swan Lake and performed the Bluebird Pas de Deux. A Straits Times review stated: "There is no doubt that Vernon Martinus has brought the ballet to stay in Singapore with his brilliant presentation."

By late 1959, the Singapore Ballet Academy had over 500 pupils and was the only ballet school on the island to admit male students. Martinus announced plans to introduce lessons in Chinese, Indian, and Malay dances, to be taught by specialist instructors. In October, he was awarded a British Council bursary to study ballet production at the Royal Ballet School and Covent Garden School, becoming the first Singaporean to receive such an award. Poh accompanied him to London to study at the Russian School of Ballet in Chelsea.

In December 1959, Martinus and Poh performed Bunga Perchinta'an, described as a "Malayan ballet", during the Loyalty Week concert at the Singapore Badminton Hall. Later that month, the Singapore Ballet Company staged The Nutcracker in full for the first time in Singapore, with Martinus and Poh as principal dancers. Martinus left for London on 14 January 1960, followed by Poh on 21 January. During their absence, Daphne Grant and Soonee Goh headed the academy, while Patricia Sadka oversaw the company.

While in London, Martinus studied all aspects of ballet production, including choreography, makeup, wardrobe, and dancer nutrition. He performed at the Royal Opera House, Convent Garden, on 1 March 1960 with other Royal Ballet School students in the annual gala attended by the Queen Mother and Princess Margaret. On 28 March, he appeared in a small role in Swan Lake with the Royal Ballet Company.

Returning to Singapore in June 1960, Martinus began planning future productions, including collaborations with a British troupe and tours to Hong Kong and Malaya. From 29 to 31 October, the Singapore Ballet Company performed Le Triangle de la Peur, based on an idea by Jean-Paul Sartre and choreographed by Martinus, alongside Grand Valse, Chandra, and Western Symphony. Le Triangle de la Peur featured Martinus, Poh, and Tan Hock Lye, with costumes by William Glass.

The company's sixth season opened at the Victoria Theatre on 13 December 1960 and ran for two weeks, with proceeds from the opening night donated to the Rotary Cheer Fund. The season included Les Sylphides, Bluebird Pas de Deux, Grande Valse, Don Quixote pas de deux, Polovtsian Dances, Swan Lake Act II, and the Nutcracker. A review praised Vivace, Martinus's original work, as "witty in the extreme".

In April 1961, the company performed at the Pavilion Theatre in Kuala Lumpur under the auspices of the Arts Council of Malaya. Its eighth season, held from 9 to 12 August 1961 at the Victoria Theatre, featured Les Sylphides, Chandra, Florestan Pas de Trois from The Sleeping Beauty, and Chiaboscuro, an original ballet by Martinus set to music by Darius Milhaud, with sets and lighting by Martinus. The Singapore Free Press described Chiaboscuro as "outstandingly original" and "sparkling with wit and good humour".

According to Denyse Tessensohn, Martinus's contribution to Singapore's dance scene could be "tangibly measured" through the successes of Singapore Ballet Academy alumni, including Goh Soo Khim, Goh Choo San, Anthony Then, Yang Yee, Sylvia Anne McCully, Chen Hai Chow, Goh Lay Kuan, Lim Fei Shen, Cecilia Hon, Patricia Hon, Francis Yeoh and Michael Ho, as well as musicians Seow Yit Kin and Dick Lee, both of whom credited Martinus as a significant influence.

=== Return to radio and the Singapore Dance Theatre (1962–1966) ===
In January 1962, Martinus announced that he was returning to his "first love" by making a "comeback" in radio at Radio Singapore, where he was to serve as a scriptwriter and present the programmes 4 o'clock Date, Tiger Quiz Show, and Box at the Ballet. His position as principal of the Singapore Ballet Academy was taken over by Frances Poh and Soonee Goh. Martinus stated that he had not "deserted" ballet and that he now had "more time to promote it." At the time, he remained in charge of the Singapore Ballet Company, which had been renamed the Singapore Ballet Group.

Martinus later recalled that he had rejoined broadcasting part-time under Maureen Liew, Head of Programmes, as he had hoped to become a television producer or director, knowing that Radio Singapore would soon move into television. That same month, he announced plans to form a new dance company. The semi-professional group, named the Singapore Dance Theatre, comprised 14 dancers. Its first programme was staged at the Victoria Theatre from 3 to 8 August 1962, featuring works choreographed by Martinus, Francis Yeoh, and Goh Soo Khim. By August, Martinus was still serving as artistic director of the Singapore Ballet Group.

At Radio Singapore, he introduced Music and Musicians, which he described as "quite popular," featuring artists such as Charles Lazaroo and Yvette Anwar. He also initiated the programme On Stage. In early 1963, Martinus began working full-time at the newly established TV Singapura as one of only two local producers initially hired. He produced the variety show Rampaian Malaysia. Although he and fellow local producer S. Chandramohan were meant to receive training from overseas producers, these producers had little time to provide it. Martinus was also required to produce programmes in Mandarin and Malay, despite not speaking either language. In 1964, he attended a course in Kuala Lumpur.

Following the announcement of the finalists of Radio Singapore's Talentime, Martinus produced a programme featuring all ten finalists. He also created programmes showcasing the ballet group and the academy, such as Laila, which he described as a Malayan adaptation of Giselle. Additionally, he assisted with set and costume design, noting that the designers had "little or no experience at all on the stage."

In January 1964, the Straits Times columnist "Thespis" wrote that while Martinus was "doing an outstanding job of work" at Television Singapura, his "defection" had caused local ballet to "wilt a little." The columnist stated that he had "come to await eagerly the gorgeous 'Vic' ballet productions" staged by Martinus and Frances Poh, though he acknowledged that "economic reasons made the continuance of this noble effort impossible."

Martinus later claimed to have produced the programme on which Prime Minister Lee Kuan Yew announced that Singapore would no longer be part of Malaysia, despite not belonging to the Central Production unit, which usually handled such press events. According to him, the technical producer instructed him to "fade to black," but he chose not to. Footage of Lee Kuan Yew crying—recorded separately—was later included in the broadcast.

In August 1965, it was announced that the Singapore Ballet Group would return to the Victoria Theatre for its 11th season, featuring Serenade, a romantic opening ballet choreographed by Martinus, as well as Western Symphony and Question of Honour, in which he danced the leading roles. In August 1966, Martinus collaborated with Vernon Palmer on the televised coverage of Singapore's first National Day parade.

=== Post-radio career ===
In 1967, Martinus travelled to London to attend several study courses. Upon his return to Singapore, he began working for the Singapore branch of IBM in January 1968. In February 1969, he was promoted to Personnel and Public Relations Manager for Singapore and Malaysia for the IBM World Trade Corporation.

In April 1969, Martinus attended an IBM Management School in Hong Kong, followed by a two-week personnel and communications seminar in Tokyo. Beginning in July that year, he undertook a three-month "management development instructors course", during which he visited New York, Copenhagen, Sweden, the Netherlands, and Beirut, before returning to Singapore in October.

By May 1978, Martinus was working as a training advisor in London. He later studied at the Open University, graduating with a Bachelor of Arts degree in 1982, and earned a master's degree in Management Studies the following year. He also attended the Institute of Personnel Management. Martinus subsequently became Senior Management Trainer at Logica, where he remained until his retirement.

== Personal life and death ==
Martinus had two younger brothers, including journalist Ken Martinus. In 1954, while studying ballet at the Maudrene Yap Dancing School, he met Frances Poh, daughter of C. J. Poh, who had returned from nearly a decade of training in Scotland to take charge of the school. The couple announced their engagement on 27 February 1956 at the school, shortly before evening lessons began. They married at St Andrew's Cathedral on 6 October that year, with more than 700 guests in attendance. By October 1959, they had one daughter. Martinus relocated to London in 1972. By November 1983, the couple had two sons in addition to their daughter and were living in Britain.

In May 2001, Martinus stated: "If I am allowed one regret in my past life, it is the fact that I left Peck Hay Road and the teaching of ballet for television and the commercial world." As of November 2002, he was living in West Sussex, South East England. He died there in September 2022, with little media commemoration in Singapore. Fellow dance pioneer Cecilia Hon observed that there had been "so little news" and "nothing in the newspaper" for both Martinus's death and that of Soonee Goh, who had died a year earlier.
