= Rose Eberwein =

Singaporean former dancer and choreographer

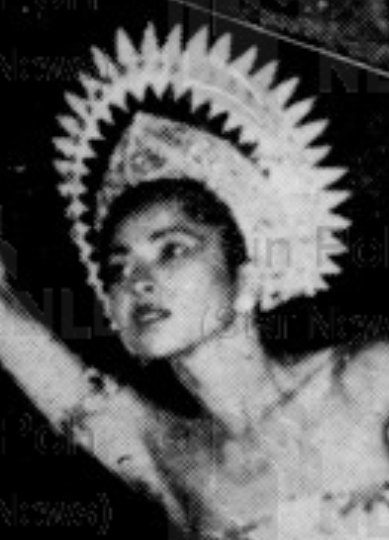
Eberwein performing in 1953

Rose Eberwein (born 1928 or 1929) is a Singaporean former dancer, choreographer and dance teacher active from the 1950s to 1970s. Initially raised in Thailand, where she was taught to dance, Eberwein was brought to Singapore as a child. After finishing school, she became a school teacher, teaching, studying and performing dance on the side. From 1957 to 1958, Eberwein studied dance in London under Phyllis Bedells. Eventually, she made teaching and performing dance her full-time occupation and founded her own dance school.

Eberwein went on a three-month study-tour to Thailand and Myanmar from 1959 to 1960, during which she studied at the Bangkok Academy of Fine Arts and performed before the Thai King and Queen. This was followed by study-tours of East Asia, Southeast Asia and Australia in 1962 and of the United Kingdom and the United States in 1964, working with several prominent dancers and choreographers. Eberwein became the art director of the short-lived National Theatre Dance Company in 1969 and began focusing on her career as a dance tutor soon after. According to journalist Avanti Nim, Eberwein "single-handedly put Singapore on the global dancing map."

== Early life and education ==
Eberwein, who is of Filipino and Spanish descent, was born in Singapore in 1928 or 1929. The daughter of Paul Domingo, she had two siblings. She was initially raised in Bangkok, where she was taught ballet as part of her regular school curriculum. While there, she watched a several hour long dance performance at a temple, an experience which led to her gaining a "fascination for regional dances." At the age of 10, she was brought to Singapore. During the Japanese occupation of Singapore, which lasted from 1942 to 1945, she was taught Japanese traditional dances, as well as local dances. She attended secret lessons held at the Convent of the Holy Infant Jesus to prepare for the Senior Cambridge examinations. Although the nuns were "more concerned with turning out students who could behave like well-bred young women rather than with producing women athletes", Eberwein enjoyed playing netball and hockey and was made the team leader for the school sports. After the occupation, she initially wished to become a professional dancer, but her father persuaded her to become a teacher instead. As such, she studied at the Teacher's Training College at Cairnhill.

== Career ==
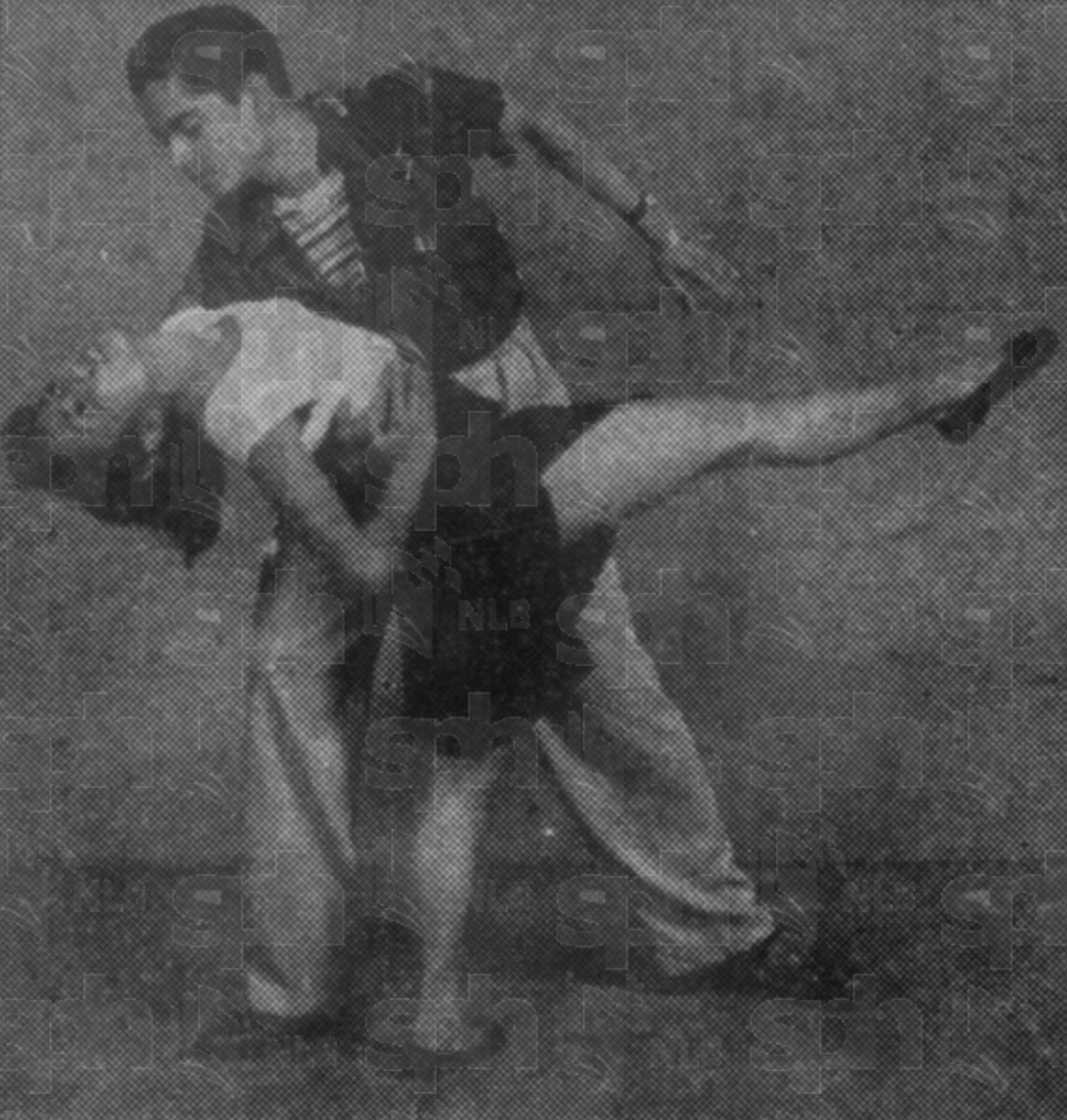
Eberwein dancing with Vernon Martinus in The Legend of Frankie and Johnnie as part of Show Business in August 1952

After completing her education at the Teacher's Training College, Eberwein became a schoolteacher specialising in English. However, she continued to study dance, which she also began to teach. She had a role in the Balinese duet Bewitched, presented by the Fine Art of Movement Academy at the Victoria Theatre and Concert Hall from 18 to 20 January. By January 1952, she had already been studying under Rita Rosalie Vlick, head of the Fine Art of Movement Academy, for eight months. The Singapore Standard described her as an "accomplished performer" and the "brightest" of Vlick's pupils. Later that month, she starred in a classical dance recital staged by the academy at the Victoria Theatre. She had two roles, one of which involved Balinese dancing with actor Osman Gumanti, featuring as a guest artiste. Maxine Rakich of the Singapore Standard wrote that Eberwein was among the academy's "two most promising pupils." In August, she danced with Vernon Martinus in The Legend of Frankie and Johnny, a segment of the musical Show Business, 1952, staged by Martinus at the Victoria Theatre. She performed in the title role of a production of Prokofiev's Cinderella, staged at the Victoria Theatre in April 1954.

In April 1957, Eberwein left for London to study at the Royal Academy of Dance. She had already passed the academy's elementary examinations and it was the examiner who encouraged her to study dance in England. By then, she was specialising in Polynesian dance, although she considered Siamese dance her "favourite." Eberwein had also been running her own dance school for several months. While there, she studied under ballerina Phyllis Bedells, who reportedly "recommended her for a professional career." In August, Eberwein was given her own solo programme by BBC Television, where she lectured on and demonstrated "Oriental" dance techniques. She also attended summer courses at Sadler's Wells under Dame Ninette de Valois. Susan Barrie of The Straits Times described her then as "one of Malaya's finest exports of Oriental dancing". She was then invited to perform at the Merdeka Ball, held at the Royal Festival Hall in London on 31 August. By December, she had trained six English girls "in the art of Oriental dance". Eberwein was offered a stage contract which she rejected as she believed that a "teaching career mixes better with marriage." She announced plans to write a book on "Malayan culture".

Eberwein returned to Singapore in February 1958. She began modelling for Indonesian painter Basuki Abdullah, who taught her about the "art and culture of Java, mostly in dance form." She staged a performance of Spanish and Balinese dances, featuring her students, at the Raffles Hotel ballroom as part of the Red Cross Ball. Eberwein was given the role of Azuri in a staging of the operetta The Desert Song, produced by Charles Wilkinson in June 1959. This was her first speaking role and she was also given the task of training 16 girls to dance for the show's numerous dance numbers. In the same year, she founded the Rose Eberwein School of Dancing, teaching out of a dance studio in a wing of her home. She also had a role in the Cathay Keris film Noor Islam, which was filmed beginning on 9 October, as the assistant to the High Priest. She performed as the "principal temple dancer" during a dance number in the film, for which she did the choreography. Other responsibilities given to her included designing the dance costumes and headdresses, teaching the dancers the choreography and arranging the film's score. Eberwein and 17 of her pupils were among the nearly 100 artists who performed at a National Loyalty Week dance recital, held at the Happy World Stadium in December. The Singapore Free Press said that she was "superb in hand and arm movements."

=== Study-tours ===
In December 1959, Eberwein left for Bangkok to spend several months studying Burmese and Thai dancing at the Bangkok Academy of Fine Arts, as part of a planned tour around Southeast Asia. She claimed to have been the first "outsider" to be afforded this opportunity and that the Director-General of the Fine Arts Department of Thailand personally introduced the academy's staff and principal to her. While there, she would practice dance movements in the mornings and study dance drama episodes, Thai music and literature in the afternoons. On 22 January 1960, Eberwein performed before then-King of Thailand Rama IX and then-Queen of Thailand Sirikit. The performance involved choreographing two dances to a composition of the king. The queen had first heard of her through Abdullah, who had painted a portrait of Eberwein, and asked for her to perform a Balinese dance. The Fine Arts Department and the Embassy of the Philippines also in Bangkok arranged for her to appear on television. On the same trip, Eberwein also visited Myanmar, studying Burmese dance in Yangon and Mandalay.

Eberwein's three-month trip to Thailand concluded in March 1960, after which she returned to Singapore. Later that month, she performed at a meeting of the Singapore chapter of the Pan Pacific and Southeast Asia Women's Association at the home of the Burmese Consul in Singapore. She danced in the Thai sections of the International Dance Night, staged at the Victoria Theatre on 4 and 5 May. Eberwein and her students performed at a ball held by the Singapore Red Cross Society at The Cathay Restaurant on 15 July to raise funds for the construction of the Red Cross House. On 3 November, she left for Hong Kong. The Singapore Free Press then called her "Singapore's leading exponent in Eastern and Western dancing." Eberwein appeared on Hong Kong television on 8 November. She also announced plans to establish a dance school focused on "oriental dancing" there. In June 1961, she embarked on a study tour to Yogyakarta, Solo, Bandung and Bali, which was arranged by Surjono Sastrowardojo, the Indonesian Consul of Culture in Singapore. She was to learn Javanese dance among other dances. While in Bali, she visited the town of Tabanan, where she met the Kebyar dancer I Mario, who choreographed a version of the Oleg dance for her. After returning to Singapore in November, she choreographed and the designed the costumes for a pantomime production of Peter Pan, staged by the Stage Club at the Victoria Theatre on 16 December. In August 1962, Eberwein and her students performed at the Cultural Centre in aid of the Mount Alvernia Hospital building fund.

On 13 September 1962, Eberwein embarked on a three-month "pan-Orient" study-tour, during which she would appear on television and visit prominent dance schools. She first arrived in Sydney where she appeared on television. She then went to Manila, where she remained for six weeks. While there, she studied Filipino folk dances with the Bayanihan Philippine National Folk Dance Company. With the troupe, she also performed her own dance form, a "fusion of dance movements from South-east Asia" which she called "Kambodja Exotica". The next stop on her tour was Hong Kong, where she had a television programme on classical Southeast Asian dances. She next flew to Taipei, where she had, with the help of Ly Singko, been allowed to watch the students of the Foottsing Dramatic Theatre as they trained. The last destination of her tour was Tokyo, where she viewed traditional dance performances. She also demonstrated the teaching methods of the Royal Academy of Dance to Russian-trained ballet students at the International Artists Centre. In August 1963, Eberwein announced her plans to form a "collection of dances typically Malayan", including dances such as Ronggeng and the Chinese ribbon dance.

Eberwein left Singapore on a six-month tour of the United States and the United Kingdom in May 1964. She first went to London and attended a refresher course at the Royal Academy of Dance. She also gave a lecture-demonstration course at the academy on Southeast Asian dances. She opened the academy's Summer Course with a recital of Southeast Asian dances. Eberwein then visited major cities in Europe, including Paris, Rome and Madrid, before she arrived in New York City in September, after which she spent the next three months touring different states and working with other choreographers. The United States leg of the tour was arranged through a cultural exchange programme of the USIS. This allowed her to work with Balanchine's Company, Martha Graham, José Limón, Luigi and Matt Mattox. Eberwein also lectured and demonstrated at 15 colleges across the country. She was offered the opportunity to teach at the Washington School of Ballet for a year, although she declined as her husband and her school in Singapore "tipped the balance." The tour ended up lasting seven months, during which she learnt the "latest teaching methods of ballet, modern jazz, Spanish dances and modern dances. She was also able to observe the backstage work of Broadway shows, television programmes and live productions. After returning to Singapore, she staged a performance in November featuring electronic music, which she had come across on her tour. The performance was reportedly the "first of its kind" in Singapore. It was held at the Cultural Centre in aid of five charity organisations. In a review of the performance, Margaret Burrows of The Straits Times wrote: "Mrs. Eberstein and all the dancers who took part are to be congratulated upon an altogether refreshing performance. In 1967, Eberwein went on a trip to Mexico, where she worked with the Folklorico Mexicana Dance Company and learnt Spanish-influence Latin-American dances.

=== Post-tour career ===
Eberwein served as the artistic director for the debut performance, Five Score and Fifty Years, of the National Theatre Dance Company, held in August 1969. She choreographed the segment of The Enchanted Demon Prince, which featured a cast of 26 and music composed by Colin McPhee. However, the company never performed again as it suffered from a lack of funding, which meant that the dancers could not be paid "enough to live on." As such, it could not achieve "professional status." As artistic director, she was required to "do everything herself", with "no money for lighting, no money for sets, no tailors who knew how to make costumes." After the failure of the company, Eberwein shifted her focus to teaching, working at the school six to seven hours a day six days week. In January 1971, Eberwein presented two dance items at the Pacific Asia Travel Association conference, held in Manila. According to the Singapore Tourist Promotion Board, this was the first Singaporean culture show presentation at PATA. In August 1973, it was announced that Eberwein would be playing the role of Eliza in an upcoming production of the musical The King and I as a "comeback" to the stage after having spent the last few years teaching. She also choreographed the 20-minute Uncle Tom's Cabin dance sequence. The performance was to be staged by the Young Musicians' Society and produced by Eileen Smith. It was held at the Victoria Theatre in November.

By February 1990, Eberwein had retired. An exhibition on both Eberwein and fellow dance pioneer Lee Shu Fen was held at the One Fullerton Sea View Channel in May 2011 as part of Singapore Dance Week. Avanti Nim of The Business Times wrote that Eberwein was among Singapore's "most prolific dancers" and that she "single-handedly put Singapore on the global dancing map."

== Personal life ==
Eberwein married a Qantas official. Her husband left for London to accompany her in August 1957. They lived on Braddell Road.
