= Ronald Alcantra =

Singaporean singer and actor (born 1929)

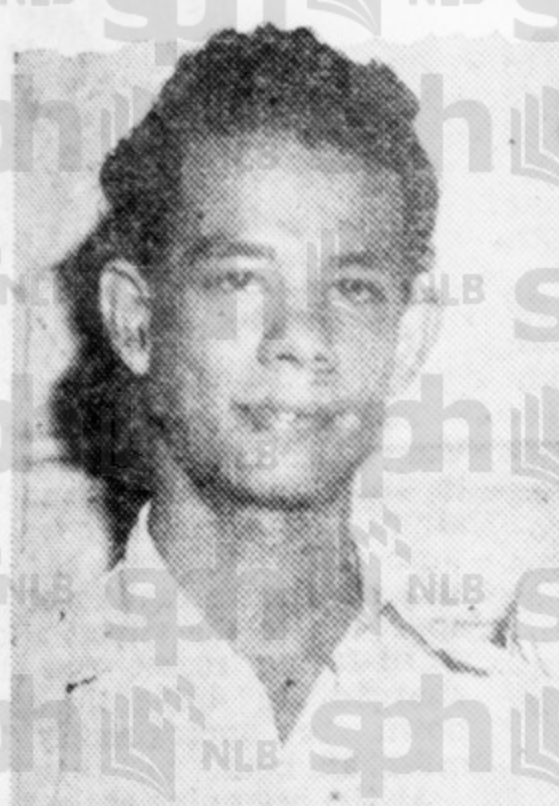
Alcantra in 1953

Ronald Alcantra (born 1929) was a Singaporean part-time singer, actor and playwright. He won the 1955 All-Malaya edition of Radio Malaya's Talentime as a singer. In the 1960s, he began acting and singing in local theatrical productions. His first play, An Eclipse Leaves No Shadows, won first place in the 'one-act play' category of a playwriting competition organised by the Ministry of Culture.

== Early life ==
Alcantra was born in 1929. His father reportedly encouraged the family to sing "during their leisure." He was of Eurasian descent.

== Career ==
Alcantra initially worked as a stenographer at RAF Tengah. In 1953, he successfully auditioned to sing at the Victoria Memorial Hall on 22 September for the Singapore City Day celebrations for that year. By then, he had participated in group singing sessions and had sung solos to the Korean prisoners-of-war held at the Selarang Barracks and to patients at the British Military Hospital, though he had "never taken part in competitive singing." He sang Ave Maria and Because, accompanied by pianist Les Price, who was his colleague at Tengah. He did not use a microphone and his "tenor voice deeply impressed the selectors." Alcantra sang in the variety show Show Business, 1954, staged by Vernon Martinus at the Victoria Memorial Hall from 17 to 20 June 1954.

Alcantra was one of 120 acts who auditioned for the 1954 All-Malaya edition of Radio Malaya's Talentime, a talent contest. For his performance, he sang Believer. He was in the first round of auditions and was one of 19 out of 43 acts that were selected for the contest itself. He was placed in the first semi-final of the contest, held at the Singapore Badminton Hall on 15 November. He sang The Lord's Prayer and won first place in his batch, receiving 136 out of 150 possible points. However, he did not come within the top three in the finals. Alcantra competed in the 1955 Singapore Amateur Talent Quest, held on 19 June, coming second. He then participated in that year's edition of the All-Malaya Talentime, staged at the Singapore Badminton Hall, again qualifying for the finals, which was held on 26 November. He again performed The Lord's Prayer. This time, he came in first place out of the 26 acts which made it to the finals, winning a free trip to Japan. As the winner, Alcantra appeared as a guest artiste at the following edition of the contest. Despite winning Talentime, he chose not to pursue singing professionally as his job at RAF Tengah gave him "security", though he claimed to hope for a scholarship to study music overseas.

Beginning in the mid-1960s, Alcantra performed as part of the chorus in local stage productions. He did not have any formal training as an actor and "picked up what he could" as he "went from one producer to another." In 1967, Alcantra acted as the Duke of Dunstable in the Sceneshifters' production of the Gilbert and Sullivan operetta Patience, staged at the Victoria Theatre from 28 November to 2 December. He then played Prince Sou-Chong in the Sceneshifters' production of Franz Lehár's operetta The Land of Smiles, staged at the Victoria Theatre in November 1971. This was the group's first production featuring a predominantly local cast as many of its English members left Singapore as part of the British military's withdrawal from the country. In the same year, he had a supporting role in a production of The Student Prince. Critic "G.T.C." of The Straits Times wrote that Alcantra was "visually more acceptable" when singing but "lost character when in speech". Alcantra was elected to the committee of the Sceneshifters in April 1973. He acted as Frank Butler in the Sceneshifters' production of the musical Annie Get Your Gun, staged at the Victoria Theatre from 22 to 26 May. Critic Violet Oon of the New Nation opined that while Alcantra had "always been rather stiff" and "could be more expressive", he was "improving with every production" and his voice "was in good form". In 1978, Alcantra had a leading role as Bill Hickok at the YMCA Sceneshifters' production of the musical Calamity Jane, staged at the Victoria Theatre from 24 to 28 May. By then, his "frequent appearances in plays and musicals [had] made him a familiar figure and voice to showgoers". He was then working at the Port of Singapore Authority as an officer. He had also performed in local productions of The Pirates of Penzance, Rose-Marie and Waltz Without End. Actress and writer Margaret Chan, then a critic with the New Nation, opined that Alcantra "combined a strong tenor voice with good acting" and that he now "seems to move around the stage with new confidence."

In August 1978, it was announced that Alcantra's play An Eclipse Leaves No Shadows had won the one-act category of a playwriting contest organised by the Ministry of Culture. As the winner of the competition, he received $1,000 in prize money. He had written and submitted four plays for the competition. An Eclipse Leaves No Shadows, a historical drama, centred on the feud between Sir Stamford Raffles and William Farquhar. According to Alcantra, it "highlight[ed] the contributions of Farquhar", an "often-neglected" figure in Singaporean history. Terry Tan of the New Nation opined that he was "excellent at etching moods and casting subtle auras over his scenes." Alcantra had spent over a year researching local history and had found that Raffles's "luminance tended to eclipse everyone, that much that was done by lesser mortals had gone largely unnoticed." Writing the play took three weeks. He had initially submitted it as a full-length play but it was re-classified as a one-act play due to its short duration. By then, Alcantra had acted as Freddie Eyns-ford Hill in a production of the musical My Fair Lady and was a traffic superintendent at the Port Authority at Keppel Wharf. However, he had gone two years without singing. After winning the competition, he acted and sang in a production of the musical Stardust by the Breadline Group as a "come-back" to singing. He participated in that year's edition of RTS Talentime, held on 14 November.

In 1979, he wrote a three-act comedy tentatively titled Ma Deus, (Note: According to Tan Choon Guan of the New Nation, 'Ma Deus', which is Portuguese for 'My God', is a "common" Eurasian expression.) which he called a "situation comedy with a Singaporean flavour". It follows a Eurasian Singaporean girl and her family as her American boyfriend comes to stay with them. It was Alcantra's attempt at "portray[ing] the Eurasian way of life as [he saw] it." He had previously dabbled with playwriting for his "own amusement" in the mid-1970s. However, after it was met with a "lukewarm" reception from his friends, he decided to "mothball" the play. In this period, he retired from the Port Authority to pursue a career in playwriting. Eventually, the script came into the possession of local poet and playwright Robert Yeo, who "liked it" and recommended it to the Experimental Theatre Club, which decided to stage the play in 1980. Chandran K. Lingam, who was to direct, stated that the play "showed promise and potential." Alcantra claimed to be more interested in having Ma Deus staged instead of An Eclipse Leaves No Shadows as he believed that the latter was "much too heavy". By then, he had also become an honorary member of the Stage Club and was no longer a member of the Sceneshifters. The Experimental Theatre Club initially planned to stage Ma Deus in March but they reportedly "[couldn't] get enough Singaporeans to come forward to take part". According to writer Ng Yi Sheng, it is "unclear" if Ma Deus was ever staged.

An Eclipse Leaves No Shadows was adapted into the second episode of Drama — Made in Singapore, the first English-language drama serial made in Singapore. The episode aired on 17 December 1988.

== Personal life ==
Alcantra moved to Australia in 1978.
