= Sylvia McCully =

Singaporean ballet dancer and choreographer

Sylvia Anne McCully (born 1949) is a Singaporean ballet dancer, choreographer and dance instructor. She founded the Sylvia McCully School of Dancing and has choreographed dance sequences for multiple Singapore National Day parades.

== Early life and education ==
McCully is of Eurasian descent. Her mother, a Chinese-Eurasian who had retired from teaching to look after her children, came from a musical family while her father, a Singapore-born Scotsman, was also musically inclined. She spent her early childhood in Bedok before she moved with her family to Penang for her father's work. At the age of seven, McCully began taking ballet lessons along with one of her older brothers from Soonee Goh and Blossom Shek, who came to Penang every weekend to teach at a recreation club. Her first performance was held at the Singapore Badminton Hall.

By the time she was 10, McCully and her family had returned to Singapore and she was receiving ballet lessons at the Singapore Ballet Academy. However, her parents divorced around this period. Her father left for Britain while her mother took her and her siblings to live with her maternal grandfather in Katong, Singapore. Her mother began teaching English to support the family, although McCully continued receiving ballet lessons. In 1960, she was awarded honours in the Royal Academy of Dance examinations and was awarded the Dr. C. J. Poh Shield along with five other students of the academy. She was then a student of St. Hilda's School. In the same year, she became a winner of the Mixed Dances section of the Youth Cultural Festival Competition, which was organised by the Singapore Teachers' Union. She performed with two other winners of the section at the Victoria Theatre in aid of the National Theatre Fund. At the age of 16, McCully left for London to study at the Royal Ballet School, where she remained for three years. She then learned the flamenco in Madrid.

== Career ==
On her return to Singapore in 1969, McCully had hoped to join the proposed National Theatre Dance Company, a project which was eventually shelved due to lack of funds. She founded a dance school at the Tung Ling English School. In February 1970, The Straits Times reported that she was a "leading local ballerina". On 27 January, McCully, then a member of the newly-formed National Dance Company, appeared on the back page of the New Nation becoming one of the paper's first "Back Page Girls". By July 1971, she was a ballet teacher and had made plans for establishing a dance company. Later that year, she was selected by Australian choreographer Colin David Griffith to dance the lead role in his pantomime ballet Snow White held at the Singapore Conference Hall in conjunction with National Day. According to her, it was the first full-scale local ballet performance since 1965. She was a lead dancer with the 67-member Singapore cultural troupe at the 1972 Adelaide Festival, which was led by parliamentary secretary Sha'ari Tadin. McCully portrayed the maiden in a dance adaptation of The Cowherd and the Weaver Girl. She and Sha'ari were interviewed by radio stations there. Lo Tien Yin of The New Paper wrote in 1990 that McCully was one of the few Singaporeans to "take up ballet seriously" in the 1960s and that in the 1970s, "whenever there was any dance show in TV, it was inevitably McCully dancing."

In 1973, she again danced the lead with the Singapore cultural troupe in a production of The Cowherd and the Weaver Girl in the Soviet Union. The Straits Times wrote in December that she was perhaps the only local "full-time dancer", noting that she supported herself by giving private dance lessons, teaching English, appearing on television and choreographing for fashion shows and nightclub singers. She performed with the troupe in Indonesia in October 1974, playing the same role. In January 1975, she closed down her dance studio to teach for the Ministry of Education at the Musical Arts Centre. She was among the artistes selected to represent Singapore at the ASEAN Exchange of Radio and Television Artistes in the same year. In September 1977, she performed in an opera excerpt from Dido and Aeneas as part of a Music for Everyone concert. McCully gave a joint performance with five other dance instructors at the 1978 Singapore Festival of Arts. In the same year, she received the National Youth Service Award as she had "successfully blended classical ballet movement with modern music, introducing local themes to make ballet more popular among the young." She was the first woman to receive the award. She was then a teacher at the Young Musicians' Society with around 300 students. She had also taught ballet at the Methodist Girls' School as an extracurricular activity. She had also made several appearances on the local stage and television by then, sometimes in aid of charity.

McCully founded the Sylvia McCully School of Dancing at Thomson Plaza in 1981, serving as its principal. In the same year, she became a judge for the Singapore Disco Dancing Championship. She was approached to choreograph a production of The Mikado which was staged in July 1981 as part of MGS Stage '80, a fundraising effort by the Methodist Girls' School. In 1988, she organised the dance school's first full-scale public performance, the proceeds of which went to the National Kidney Foundation Singapore, the St. Hilda's School and the Yio Chu Kang Constituency Citizens Consultative Committee. McCully directed a production of The Nutcracker, held in December 1990 in aid of charity. The production featured over 200 of her students from her dance school and was the first time The Nutcracker received a full-scale performance in Singapore in 31 years. McCuly had played Clara the last time it had been staged. In the same year, she choreographed for the Eurasian contingent at the 1990 National Day Parade. McCully choreographed for the 800-member combined schools choir at the 1994 and 1996 National Day Parades. She choreographed for the 600 "cheerleaders" at the 2001 parade. She also choreographed for the Eurasian Association's contingent at the 2009 Chingay parade. Her ballet shoes were placed on display at the association's Eurasian Heritage Gallery. By 2016, she had choreographed dance sequences for 13 National Day Parades.

== Personal life ==
McCully married in 1975. She has two children, including triathlete Jonathan Fong. While she was pregnant with her second child, she danced and made appearances in several dance television programmes.
