= Charles Lazaroo =

Singaporean musician (1923–1983)

Lazaroo in 1972

Charles Godfrey Lazaroo (21 August 1923 – 29 March 1983) was a Singaporean musician and schoolteacher who became the music director of the Singapore Broadcasting Corporation shortly before his death. He was a founding member and the director of the National Dance Company, the chairman of the Young Musicians' Society and the composer of several pieces for the Singapore Youth Choir. Esplanade Offstage states that his name was "synonymous with the composing, arranging and playing of music in Singapore for the majority of his 60 years."

== Early life and education ==
Lazaroo was born in Singapore on 21 August 1923. He was of Eurasian descent. His family lived in Newton. He was the eldest of five siblings and the only one in the family to have been sent for piano lessons. In 1930, he began attending Raffles Primary School. He joined the Children's Orchestra three years later. He performed with the orchestra at a Children's Concert held at the Victoria Memorial Hall on 10 April 1935. A critic with The Malaya Tribune considered his act the "high spot" of the evening, opining: "[Lazaroo] not only demonstrated good technique but played with real expression and a delighted audience encored him enthusiastically." After graduating from Raffles Primary in 1936, Lazaroo began attending St. Joseph's Institution the following year. He completed his studies there in 1941. From 1946 to 1949, he studied at the Raffles College, from which he graduated with a Diploma of Arts.

== Career ==
After graduating from college, Lazaroo began teaching at the Raffles Institution. He was elected the president of the Musicians' Union of Singapore in July 1949. He had chosen teaching as a profession as his father had wanted him to become a civil servant. By the following year, he had become the leader of an orchestra which was featured on the Radio Malaya programme Rhythm Parade on 7 June. In the 1950s, he became an arranger and composer for Radio Malaya. He also left Raffles Institution in this period. Lazaroo achieved his Licentiate from the Royal Schools of Music in 1953. By July of the following year, he was the leader of a "dance band". In 1959, Lazaroo became the bandleader and arranger for Radio Singapore's talent competition Talentime. In the same year, he was employed at the Beatty Secondary School as a teacher. During this period, he was a member of Tiga Sekawan, an instrumental trio which "played popular Malayan and Indonesian tunes in a Western style." Lazaroo would play the piano with Winston Filmer on the bass and Dick Abell on the guitar. The Without a Song programme, which began airing on Radio Singapore on 10 May, featured Lazaroo playing the piano and Julai Tan playing the violin. Sometime in the 1960s, he was appointed an Inspector of Schools. By March 1963, he and his band, which then comprised him, Ahmad Daud and Wilma Tang, were featured on Dindang Ria, a popular weekly "musical pot-pourri" Television Singapura programme produced by Vernon Martinus. In the same year, he became a teacher at the Siglap Secondary School.

According to Esplanade Offstage, in the 1960s, Lazaroo was "continually in the public eye" and was "popular" with local singers and bands who consulted him on arranging music for television and radio. On 19 June 1965, a composition of his, titled Malayan Jazz Suite, was performed at the Victoria Theatre by a 17-member ensemble directed by Ahmad Ja'afar. In the same year, he taught at the Ahmad Ibrahim Secondary School before being transferred over to Swiss Cottage Secondary School as Vice-Principal. He returned to Yusof Ishak Secondary School in 1968 as its Principal. In August 1970, the Ministry of Education appointed him the Specialist Instructor (of Music) and he was to oversee the introduction of brass bands in secondary schools and bugle and fife bands in primary schools. This also gave him the responsibility of designing the syllabus for school music lessons. By October, he had become the chairman of the Young Musicians' Society. He was also made a member of the National Theatre Trust and a Director for the Extra-Curricular Services Centre (Music) of the Ministry of Education in the same year. At a performance at the Victoria Theatre on 7 July 1971, the Singapore Youth Orchestra and the Singapore Youth Chinese Orchestra, conducted by Goh Say Meng, performed Lazaroo's Chinese New Year. His arrangements of four songs from Jesus Christ Superstar were performed by the Singapore Youth Choir at the Singapore Conference Hall on 21 and 22 September 1972. In the same year, he became a founding member and director of the National Dance Company, which toured internationally.

In 1973, Lazaroo was awarded the Public Administration Medal (Bronze). In that year, he also composed a piece to be performed by a combined schools choir during Prime Minister Lee Kuan Yew's arrival at the opening of the National Stadium. In November, he and Goh Soon Tioe were sent on a two week-long music exchange programme with West Germany. During the trip, which was sponsored by the government of Bonn, the two visited music academies in seven major cities in the country. This was reportedly the first time Singaporean musicians had been invited on a study tour of Germany. By July 1975, Lazaroo had become a senior music advisor with the Ministry of Education and was the chairman of the Singapore Youth Musicians' Association. In the same year, was appointed the chairman of the Music for Everyone Advisory Committee, a position he continued to hold until 1979. He also composed the Lionisle and Suiram Suite, with the former being a children's operetta which was performed by the Children's Choir. The latter was instead performed by the National Dance Company. Described as its first "completely Singaporean package", it had become a "permanent part" of the company's repertoire by 1977. For the 1979 Festival of Choirs, held in May, Lazaroo composed the Medley of Malay Songs, with critic "L.P.A." of The Straits Times opining that while "simple tuneful music does not need much to make it appearling", Lazaroo "manages to squeeze out that extra little in ardour." In June, the Singapore Youth Choir performed a piece of his titled Pop Mass, which was described as a "modern setting of the traditional five sections of a sung mass in the English tradition." He was also appointed to the Advisory Committee on Instrumental Music in that year. By May 1980, Lazaroo had been appointed the chairman of the Programme of the Singapore Festival of Arts. His composition, Mass, was also performed at the Festival of Choirs held that month. "V. Vace" of the New Nation wrote that the piece "emerged more like an intellectural musical exercise than a song to be enjoyed."

Lazaroo officially retired from civil service in 1980. In August, he received the Public Service Star (Silver) for his "contributions to music education and music in Singapore." In the same year, he composed Temasek in Dance an hour-long dance drama that was first performed at the People's Association's anniversary concert. The following year, he recorded and released a jazz album, The Exotic Touch Goes East, featuring him and local jazz pianist David Ng. Henry Ng, a friend of theirs, had suggested recording an album featuring "Asian tunes" and had been the one to approach David Ng. Henry Ng served as the album's producer and Lazaroo arranged the pieces. He composed the song Good, Better, Best for the National Productivity Board in 1982. He also arranged The Samseng and the Chettiar's Daughter, a local adaptation of The Beggar's Opera, for that year's edition of the Festival of Arts. In January 1983, he was "hauled out of his retirement" and made the music director of the Singapore Broadcasting Corporation. However, he died at the end of his third month with the corporation. Lazaroo and singer Saloma were both posthumously featured on Irama dan Lagu, a musical television series on Malay musicians which began airing on Channel 5 in May. Both had been interviewed for the show before their deaths. A tribute concert was held by the Singapore Youth Choir in honour of Lazaroo in 1985.

== Personal life and death ==
Lazaroo married in 1952. He had two sons and one daughter, neither of whom were musically-inclined. He had come back out of retirement in 1983 as he "wanted an active life" and was "not satisfied with retirement". However, Lazaroo died of a heart attack on 29 March 1983 shortly after rehearsing with the SBC Orchestra for an upcoming trip to Kuala Lumpur as part of a musical exchange programme. His remains were cremated at the Mount Vernon Columbarium Complex.
