= Maureen Clarke (actress) =

Singaporean actress

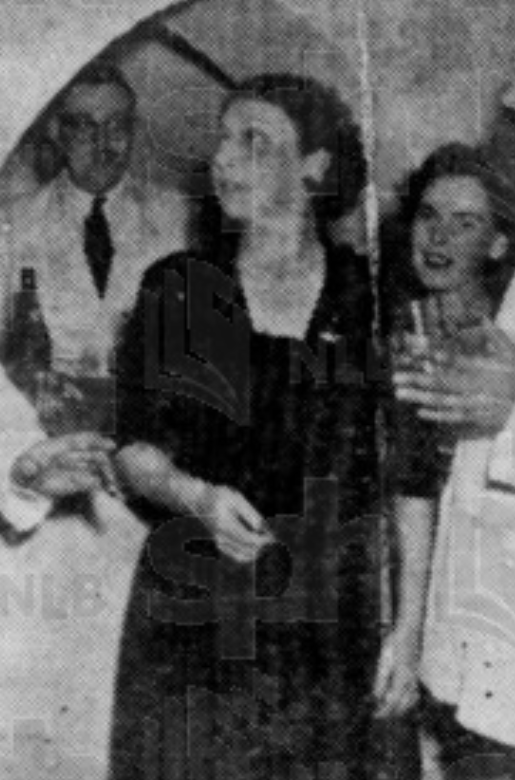
Clarke in 1950

Maureen Clarke (1914 or 1915 – 9 December 1983) was a Singaporean amateur stage actress and producer who was active from the late 1940s to the early 1980s. She was a prominent member of the Stage Club, serving as its head from 1954 to 1956 and again in 1962, though she also worked with several other local theatre groups, notably the Rowcroft Theatre Club from the late 1950s to the 1960s and the Experimental Theatre Club from the 1960s to the 1970s. Towards the end of her career, she also directed on several occasions. In 1957, A.J.C. Pelham-Groom of The Singapore Free Press wrote that it would be "impossible to give sufficient credit" to Clarke and fellow actress and producer Inez Quitzow for Singapore's "[strength] in amateur talent" and for the "high standard of Stage Club productions."

== Early life and education ==
Clarke was born in the mid-1910s. She was of Eurasian descent. Both her parents were doctors and she was an only child. She made her stage debut at the Victoria Theatre at the age of four, playing a "fairy on top of a wedding cake." By 1928, she had been studying at Madame Kelvey's School of Dance. She performed at a song and dance show featuring Kelvey's pupils, staged at the Victoria Theatre on 6 November. Clarke made several appearances in dancing plays before being sent off to a boarding school. After returning to Singapore in 1936, she mostly played sports and did not act often.

== Career ==
Clarke worked at the short-lived British Malaya Broadcasting Corporation, which was established in 1935 and replaced in 1940 by the Malaya Broadcasting Corporation. She acted as Mum Miller in a production of the one-act play Sunday Tea, staged by the Young Women's Christian Association's Business and Professional Girls' Club at the Victoria Theatre on 29 November 1941. Clarke continued to work as a broadcaster until the start of the Japanese Occupation of Singapore. She then left for Mumbai, where she remained until her return to Singapore in 1946 a year after the end of the occupation. She then joined the Tyersall Players theatrical group. She performed as Mary in a production of the Coventry Nativity play, staged at the St. Andrew's Cathedral on 29 and 30 December 1949. Clarke had a leading role in the local Young Women's Christian Association's first big production, a staging of Ireland Wood's three-act comedy Charity Begins at the Victoria Theatre on 24 and 25 February 1950. She and Evelyn Norris played the two spinster sisters who live in the house where most of the action takes place. A critic with The Singapore Free Press opined that the two were "quite at home in their parts". In the same year, she was elected to the general committees of the local branch of the Young Women's Christian Association and the Little Theatre Club, housed in the Little Theatre on Armenian Street.

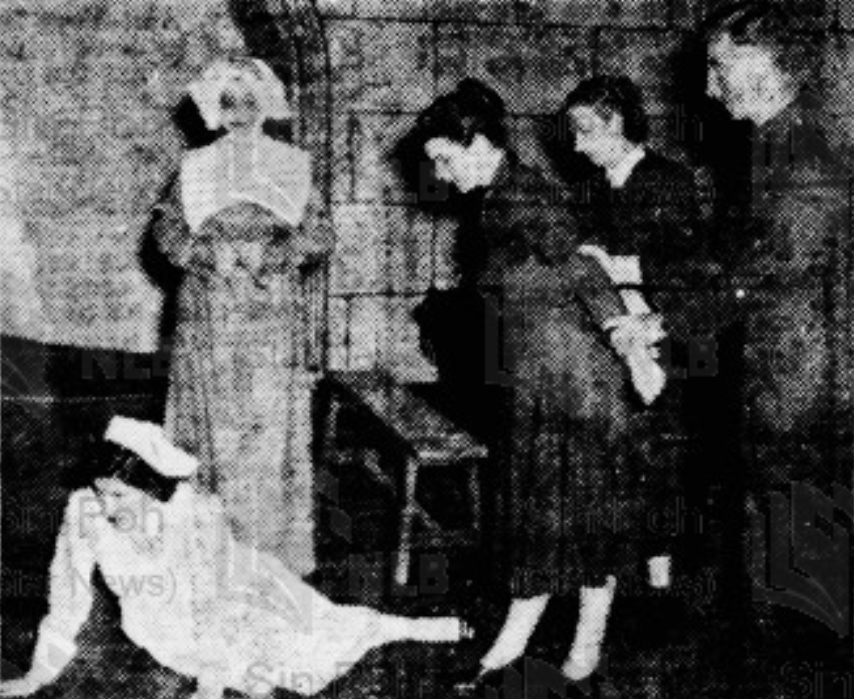
Clarke (second from left) as Sister Mary Bonaventure in Bonaventure.

In 1951, Clarke played the part of Mildred Royd in the Y.W. Players production of the play Quiet Weekend, staged at the Victoria Theatre, then renamed the Victoria Memorial Theatre on 24 and 25 August. She then acted as Mrs. Kirkby, the spiritualist, in the Stage Club's production of the comedic play You Can't Take It with You, staged at the Victoria Memorial Theatre on 13, 15 and 16 September. Clarke joined the Stage Club after this. She had a supporting role in the Singapore Arts Theatre's production of the Ruth and Augustus Goetz play The Heiress, which opened at the Victoria Theatre on 17 December 1951. This was the group's first production. "P.S." of The Singapore Standard commended her performance, though noted that the show was met with a "lukewarm reception" from the audience. Clarke had a leading role as the "conflict-torn" Sister Mary Bonaventure in the Y.W. Players' production of the Charlotte Hastings thriller play Bonaventure, staged at the Victoria Theatre on 2 and 3 May. Theatre critic "R.W.B." of The Straits Times opined that she "did excellently". On the performances of Clarke and Pamela Canavan, who played Sarat Carn, "R.W.B." stated: "These were two actresses who had viewed their parts with perception and sympathy." The production was reportedly successful and it was restaged at the Victoria Theatre on 20 and 21 June, this time in aid of the building fund of the Mount Alvernia Hospital. A critic of The Singapore Standard called Clarke's performance "excellent". She then acted as a servant in the Singapore Arts Theatre's production of the Joan Morgan play This Was a Woman. In a largely negative review of the production, "K.S." of The Singapore Free Press opined that Clarke's acting was "admirable". She played Descius's sister in the Stage Club's production of Edward Percy Smith's thriller play The Shop at Sly Corner, staged in November as part of the club's "festival of plays".

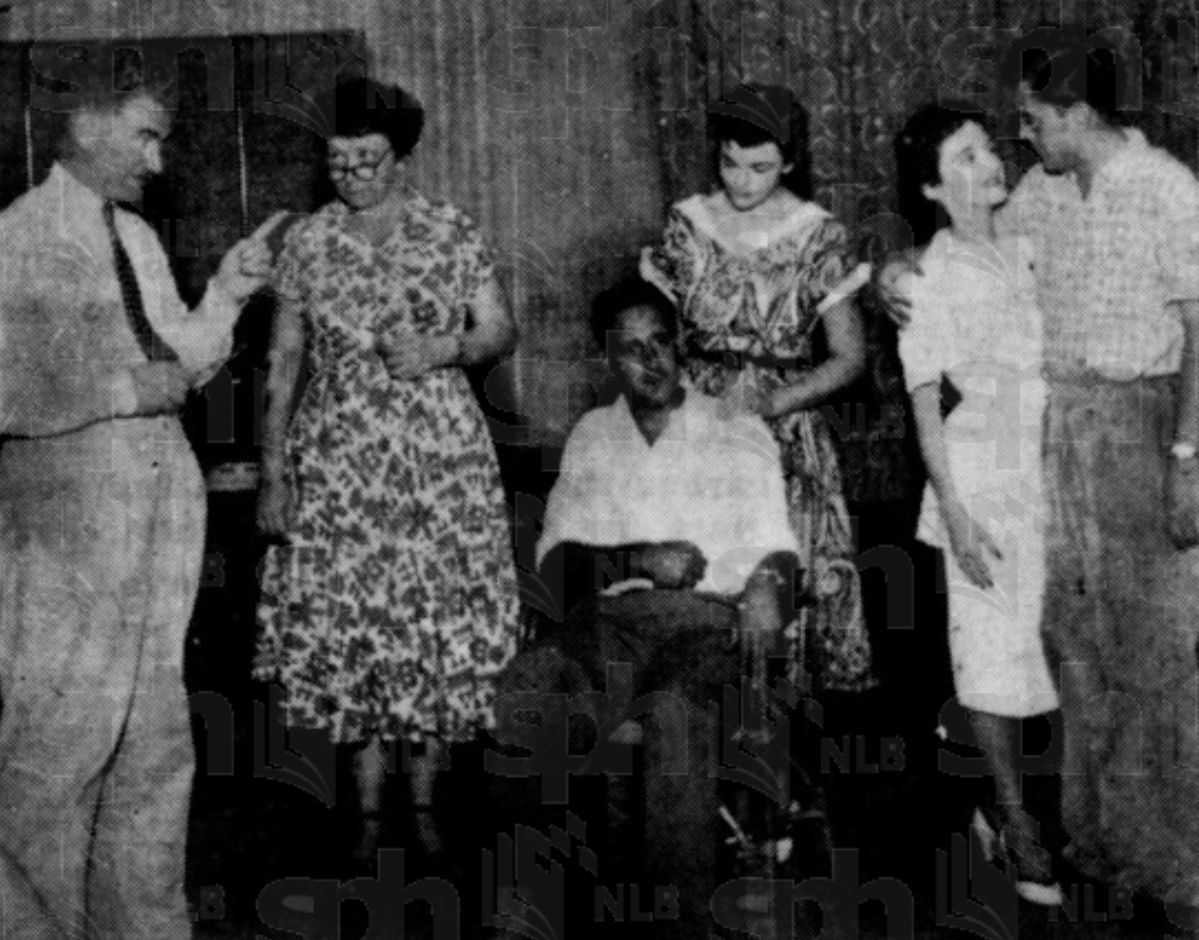
Clarke (second from left) as Jessica in The Paragon.

Clarke acted as churchgoer Mrs. Skillon in Stage Club production of the comedy See How They Run, staged at the Victoria Theatre from 29 to 31 January 1953. "R.W.B." of The Straits Times highlighted the performances of Clarke and J. Meyrick Neilson as "outstanding". She and Inez Quitzow played Helen and Teresa Browne, the two elderly aunts, respectively in the Singapore Arts Theatre's production of the Graham Greene play The Living Room, staged at the Victoria Theatre at the end of August. "M. W." of The Straits Times opined that the two "almost stole the show" and that Clarke "gave a beautifully rounded and convincing performance, perfectly timed and absolutely satisfying", noting that while she was "surely one of Singapore's better actresses", she "seldom [got] the credit she [deserved]" because "no one expect[ed] her performances to be anything but good". John Halkin of The Singapore Standard later wrote in 1957 that this was "[p]erhaps one of her most successful parts". She then appeared as Jessica, the "spiritualistic spinster aunt", in the Stage Club's production of the Robert and Michael Pertwee play The Paragon, staged at the Victoria Theatre from 8 to 10 October. However, "M.W." wrote that Clarke's performance was "not quite up to her usual standard." Clarke had a supporting role in the Singapore Arts Theatre's production of the John Vanbrugh Restoration comedy The Relapse, staged in March 1954. In the same month, she reprised her role as Helen Browne for Radio Malaya's radio adaptation of The Living Room. Halkin stated that Clarke "repeated the very satisfying performance" that she had given previously. She played Mrs. Higgins in the Stage Club's production of The Town That Would Have a Pageant, which opened at the Victoria Theatre on 5 June. The Singapore Standard's theatre critic opined that Clarke was "most convincing" and that her "blunt approach to her part in the pageant added greatly to the comedy. She then performed in Show Business, 1954, a variety show staged by Vernon Martinus at the Victoria Theatre from 17 to 20 June.

By July 1954, Clarke had become the chairman of the Stage Club. She produced the club's staging of the play Duet For Two Hands, which opened at the Victoria Theatre in August. She then acted as Felicity, the Countess of Marshwood, in the Stage Club's production of Noël Coward's Relative Values, which ran at the Victoria Theatre from 1 to 5 October. A theatre critic with the Singapore Standard opined that Clarke's performance "matured over the course of the evening" and that she "was completely at home in the second act". Another critic wrote that Clarke had "never been better", stating: "Technically it is a first class performance; she is never at a loss for word or gesture throughout an excessively long part and gives every comic line its value." In 1955, Clarke appeared in a leading role as Lady Starcross in the Stage Club's production of the Diana Morgan play After my Fashion, staged at the Victoria Theatre in March. "R.W.B." called her "excellent" with "fine control." Another critic, also of The Straits Times, opined that Clarke "carried her voice and gestures through a long part finely". Clarke reprised her role as Sistar Bonaventure for the Stage Club's production of Bonaventure, staged at the Victoria Memorial Hall from 16 to 18 November. This was the club's first show at the hall. In 1956, she produced the club's staging of As Long as They're Happy, which opened at the Victoria Memorial Hall in March. For the play, she decreased the length of rehearsals, which she instead held more of over a longer period. Previously, the performers would be "cramming" three weeks before each production. Her "experiment" was reportedly "proved a success". She then appeared in the title role of the Stage Club's production of the play Jane, staged at the Victoria Theatre from 19 to 21 October.

By January 1957, Clarke had become the Stage Club's secretary. The following month, she was elected to the general committee of the Singapore Arts Council. She participated in On Stage, a "potpourri of ballet, song and theatre" staged in April by couple Frances Poh and Vernon Martinus at the Victoria Memorial Hall, performing in the one-act thriller Master Dudley, as well as producing Holiday Eve, a slapstick comedy. Clarke then appeared as an elderly sister in the Stage Club's production of A Likely Tale, which opened at the Canning Rise Cultural Centre on 11 December. "S.B." of The Straits Times opined that she performed with "great finesse", while writer and critic A.J.C. Pelham-Groom stated that Clarke had given an "excellent" performance and wrote that he believed that she was "incapable of giving anything less." In 1958, she had the title role in the REME Dramatic Society's production of the thriller Madam Tic-Tac, which opened at the REME Theatre on Ayer Rajah Road on 23 June. She played Mrs. Gammon, the hotel cook, in the Stage Club's production of Rex Frost's Small Hotel, which ran at the Canning Rise Cultural Centre from 26 to 29 November. Her performance was praised by "J.A.B." of The Singapore Free Press as "pure gold". She produced a staging of Noel Langley's comedy Little Lambs Eat Ivy, presented at the Cultural Centre on 20 March and featuring staff and students of the Rafflesian schools in Singapore. In this period, she had also begun producing Nativity plays staged at the Saint Andrew's Cathedral.

In April 1959, Pelham-Groom credited Clarke and Inez Quitzow for Singapore's "very strong" amateur "talent" and the "high standard" of the Stage Club, writing that the two had "worked like trojans for the Stage Club" and were "always ready to give the benefit of their wide experience to other clubs." She appeared as Donna Lucia, the aunt, in the Stage Club's production of Brandon Thomas's Charley's Aunt, which opened at the Victoria Theatre on 26 December. "V.F.D." of The Straits Times opined that she was "credible and at ease" in her role. In 1960, she appeared as the Russian princess Anya Pavlikov in the Stage Club's production of Nude with Violin, which ran at the Canning Rise Cultural Centre from 23 to 26 March. "I.W.A." of The Singapore Free Press considered this "one of the best roles in which she [had] been seen". She then acted as Edith Frank in the Stage Club's production of The Diary of Anne Frank, which opened at the Canning Rise Cultural Centre on 23 April. "A.B.A." of The Singapore Free Press proclaimed this to be "one of the best" roles she had recently been in. Clarke acted as Dame Beatrice in the Stage Club's production of the comedy Breath of Spring, which ran at the Canning Rise Cultural Centre from 20 to 23 July. After this, she appeared as Hippobomene in the Stage Club's production of The Rape of the Belt, which premiered at the Victoria Theatre on 11 August. Clarke played Mrs. Bramson in the Rowcroft Theatre Club's production of the Emlyn Williams psychological thriller Night Must Fall, which ran at the Rowcroft Theatre from 16 to 19 November. On the performances of Clarke and Ronnie Rust as Dan, "V.F.D." stated: "Both are excellently cast and contribute individual performances of stature and understanding." In July 1961, Clarke was elected the vice-president of the Young Women's Christian Association of Malaya. She and Quitzow appeared in the lead roles in the Rowcroft Theatre Club's (formerly the REME Dramatic Society) production of Farewell, Farewell, Eugene, staged at the Rowcroft Theatre in December. "A.B.A." called their performances the "funniest thing that has been seen since Charles Dickens invented Chery and Merry Pecksniff." In the same year, she played Miss Forbes in the Rowcroft Theatre Club's production of William Fairchild's thriller The Sound of Murder, which was presented at the first Services Drama Festival. There, it won third place, with the judges stating that Clarke had acted with "power and conviction".

From 1962 to 1970, she appeared less regularly in Stage Club productions. In April 1962, Clarke was elected the president of the Stage Club. She acted as a widowed matriarch in the club's production of Thomas Baden Morris's Murder Without Men, which was staged at the Canning Rise Cultural Centre from 24 to 27 April. Clarke reprised her role as Madam Tic-Tac for another production of Madam Tic-Tac by the Rowcroft Theatre Club, staged at the Rowcroft Theatre from 8 to 10 April. "Thespis" of The Straits Times then described her as a "veteran of the Singapore stage (but what an evergreen one!)." In July 1965, she played the Reverend Mother in the Rowcroft Club's staging of A Letter from the General. She appeared the following year as the housekeeper in the Rowcroft club's production of Gas Light. She reprised her role as Miss Forbes for the Stage Club's production of The Sound of Murder, which opened at the Cultural Centre Theatre on 19 July 1967. By then, she had not appeared in a production from the club in "some considerable time". In 1969, Clarke acted as Helen, the mother, in the Stage Club production Shelagh Delaney play A Taste of Honey, staged at the Cultural Centre Theatre in June. She was by then the oldest member of the Rowcroft Theatre Club according to Merry Andrew, who wrote: "It would take at least one full page to get in the activities of Maureen Clarke if there were such a book as Who's Who in the Singapore Theatre." She then appeared as Mrs. Moore in a production of A Passage to India, staged by the newly-revived Centre 65 group in from 18 to 20 September at the Canning Rise Cultural Centre. She appeared as Conjur-Woman in the Stage Club's production of Dark of the Moon, which opened at the Victoria Theatre in June 1970.

After Dark of the Moon, Clarke went nearly a year without appearing on the local stage before appearing in a major role as the matriarch in the Stage Club's production of the Bill MacIlwraith black comedy The Anniversary, staged at the Cultural Centre from 2 to 5 June. Merry Andrew, now of the New Nation, then noted that while Clarke was primarily an actress she also contributed to behind-the-scenes work such painting scenery and organising props. However, in a review of her role in The Anniversary, Andrew opined that while Clarke "carried the play with a commanding stage presence, a flair for easy movement and good facial reactions", she "did not seem too happy in her role" and "some of her remarks were not sufficiently biting and pointed". She acted as Isabelle's mother in the Stage Club's production of Ring Round the Moon, staged at the Victoria Theatre in July. Andrew opined that Clarke "was obviously delighted herself with the part she was given, which allowed her to give full rein to extravagant gestures and her many grandiose remarks. She then played the titular character in the Stage Club's production of the Frank Marcus play The Killing of Sister George, which opened at the Cultural Centre Theatre on 30 September. In 1972, Clarke produced the one-act play Trace the Rainbow Through the Rain, written by local playwright Ron Chandran-Dudley and presented by the Experimental Theatre Club at the Cultural Centre in April as one of the three plays in the Three in One show. She was then working professionally at Cold Storage. Clarke then appeared in the title role of the Stage Club production of the comedy Busybody, which opened at the Cultural Centre on 28 June. Violet Oon considered her the only "outstanding" performance of the presentation, praising her "expressive face".

Clarke was elected the Stage Club's treasurer in April 1975. She then acted as Mrs. T. Ashington in the club's production of the James Read play One Mad Night, which opened at the Cultural Centre on 20 May. Her performance was generally well-received by local critics, though one reviewer noted that she had spoken in a "true British" accent despite her character being "obviously a New Yorker". In 1976, she directed the club's presentation of J. B. Priestley's An Inspector Calls, which opened at the Cultural Centre on 26 February. In 1977, Clarke reprised her role as Madam Tic-Tac for the third time, now for a Stage Club presentation of the Madam Tic-Tac play, opening at the Cultural Centre on 18 October. She considered it to be "one of the most interesting parts [she had] ever done and one of the more difficult." This was reportedly her 45th production with the club. The following year, she both directed and produced the club's staging of J. B. Priestley's Dangerous Corner, which ran at the Canning Rise Cultural Centre from 1 to 4 November. She acted as Mrs. Pearce, the housekeeper, in the Stage Club's production of Pygmalion, which played at the Cultural Centre in April 1979. Margaret Thomas of The Business Times opined that Clarke was "just right" in the role. This was followed by an appearance as the maid Berthe in the club's production of the farce Boeing-Boeing, which opened in October. Dana Lam of The Straits Times called her a "model Bertha", though opined that her "raspy" voice took "getting used to". Clarke appeared as the manageress in the club's production of Lunch Hour, staged as part of its Take 3 show. In a negative review of the play, Margaret Chan of the New Nation opined that she "gave all she could" but "just ended up looking lame". She then appeared as Janet Mackenzie in the Stage Club's presentation of The Witness for the Prosecution, which closed the Drama Festival. In 1981, Clarke directed the club's staging of The House by the Lake, which ran at the Cultural Centre, by then renamed the Drama Centre, from 22 to 25 April. She was then the club's "longest standing member". In 1983, months before her death, she acted as Helga, the Dutch psychic, in the Stage Club's production of Deathtrap, which ran at the Drama Centre from 16 to 19 March.

== Personal life and death ==
Clarke was elected the tennis convenor of the Girls' Sports Club in February 1951. In her youth, she underwent a tonsillitis surgery which involved the "shaving" of her vocal cords with a scalpel. She retired from Cold Storage in the mid-1970s at the age of 60. This resulted in what Judith Holmberg of the New Nation described as a "distinctive deep voice".

In 1983, Clarke was admitted to hospital as she had been diagnosed with cancer. She died of the disease on 9 December.
