= Florrie Sinclair =

Sinclair at her wedding in 1959.

Florrie Sinclair (née Tait; 15 March 1931 – 2 June 2018) was a Scottish dance instructor who was active in Singapore from the mid-1950s to the late 1970s. She first taught at the Frances Poh School of Dancing, which merged with the Malaya School of Ballet to form the Singapore Ballet Academy, and later founded the Sinclair School of Dancing. She also spent several decades as an examiner with the Royal Academy of Dance.

== Early life and education ==
Sinclair was born on the Orkney Islands in Scotland on 15 March 1931. She was of Quoyburray, Tankerness. She attended the Tankerness Primary School from 1936 to 1942 and then the Kirkwall Grammar School from 1942 to 1948. She was "very keen" on highland dance, which had been taught to her by her mother as there was no dancing school in Orkney at the time. While she was studying at Kirkwall, ballroom dancer Harold Mitchell came to the islands and established a dancing school in Kirkwall. She claimed to attend lessons at this school "practically every night" after classes ended. As he was "quite a small, slight man", he chose Sinclair, then 14, to be his ballroom partner and the pair performed in local halls.

Eventually, Sinclair decided that she wanted to teach dancing as a career. Her mother was "very supportive" while her father "didn't know much about dance." Sinclair left for Edinburgh to study ballet at the Scottish Ballet School, then headed by Marjorie Middleton. While there, she also studied highland dance at the Betty Brandon School of Dancing and ballroom dancing. Mitchell left the Orkney Islands on 4 March 1948, after which Sinclair returned began teaching her own classes at the Cosmo Ballroom. She claimed that her school was "very successful" as she had an "awful lot" of students, numbering over 200. Every summer, she would use the money she had earned teaching to attend courses. Eventually, she decided to further her dance education, which meant closing down her school and returning to Edinburgh to study ballet and teach ballroom and highland dancing at the Scottish Ballet School. There, when she was 22, she met Frances Poh, a ballet dancer from Singapore. The two became acquainted, though Poh eventually returned to Singapore to take over the Maudrene Yap School of Dancing, a ballet school on Keng Lee Road, from Maudrene Yap.

== Career ==
In 1955, Poh wrote to Sinclair asking if the latter would like to come to Singapore and assist her in teaching at the school, which had been renamed the Frances Poh School of Dancing. She left for the island in Autumn and began teaching at the school, which was directed by Poh and later her husband Vernon Martinus, soon after. Sinclair primarily taught the schools' junior students. She performed in Time to Dance, which was staged by the school at the Singapore Badminton Hall on 25 January. She had hurt her ankle during rehearsals, though she continued to perform against the advice of doctors, choosing instead to receive special treatment. In 1957, Poh and Martinus left to study dance in the United Kingdom, leaving Sinclair to act as the director of the school in the meantime. She claimed to be the "first Orcadian to take up dancing professionally." Later that year, Sinclair won the "Miss Cheongsam" contest held at the Chinese Swimming Club. She later recalled that she had only participated in the competition as a favour to her dressmaker. She also taught the waltz and the foxtrot dances with Charles Castleton to the Singapore Recreation Club, and these lessons were broadcast live over the local radio. In these years, she would also perform highland dances with Poh at functions. Occasionally, she would also perform at events together with Poh, Martinus and Tan Hock Lye, who was also with the academy.

Eventually, Soonee Goh, a founder of the Malaya School of Ballet approached Poh and Martinus seeking to merge their schools. The two schools came together at the end of April 1958 to form the Singapore Ballet Academy, which was to be headed by Martinus and Poh as director and principal respectively. Sinclair was to continue to serve on the teaching staff, alongside Goh and Blossom Shek, another founder of the Malaya School of Ballet. In the same year, Sinclair became a performer with the Singapore Ballet Company, established by Poh and Martinus and directed by the latter. The company had its first season from 14 to 20 August at the Canning Rise Cultural Centre and she was among the principal dancers. She continued to play a "supportive" role for the company's subsequent performances. Sinclair's contract with the Singapore Ballet Academy expired in that year, but she continued to teach there for another year on the request of Poh. In 1959, she became a freelance dance teacher, occasionally teaching with the school when a teacher was on leave. However, this ended following her miscarriage.

In November 1960, Sinclair achieved the Advanced Teacher's Certificate after sitting for the Royal Academy of Dance examinations. She then founded the Sinclair School of Dancing, which began giving lessons in January 1965. The school offered highland dancing, becoming the first in Singapore to do so, in addition to ballet and ballroom. Han Kee Juan, a future ballet dancer and teacher, was first taught dance by Sinclair at the school. After he had completed his two years of National Service, she secured him a scholarship to study at the Australian Ballet School. The school was initially taught in two flats on Oxley Rise, a residential area. However, she was later forced to move elsewhere by the Planning Department due to noise complaints. After this, the school was housed in a hall on the upper floor of the St Andrew's Cathedral. She was again asked to move as she was told that the hall would be used more by the churchgoers and so the school was shifted to the Presbyterian church hall. By March 1971, Sinclair had become the organiser of the Royal Academy of Dancing examinations in Singapore. However, she was not allowed to examine them herself as she was a ballet teacher. In July 1976, Sinclair returned from a tour to the Philippines, Hong Kong and Bangkok where she had reportedly examined over 1,000 students. She was believed to be "Singapore's first and only ballet examiner" at the time.

Sinclair served as the chairman of the ballet category at the 1978 Singapore Festival of Arts. In 1979, he school closed down due to a "lack of premises." By then, she had also taught highland dancing to the People's Association Singapore Girls Pipers. However, at that time, the Yamaha Music School establishing its ballet course in Katong and she was asked to aid in the setting up of the business. She advised the studio on how a ballet school should be run and taught the first three lessons. In October 1981, she left for Sri Lanka to conduct the Royal Academy of Dancing examinations and after her husband's official retirement, the couple left Singapore and moved to Britain, though she continued as an examiner. The following year, she taught dance in Tokyo. In April 1985, she went on a tour of the United States. After six weeks, she came to Staten Island to conduct dance examinations. Sinclair stopped examining in 2002 as by then she had hit the age limit for examiners, though she continued to teach.

== Personal life and death ==
When Sinclair came to Singapore, she acquired a flat in Katong, though she often stayed with Poh or her parents, who lived in a house on St. Patrick's Road owned by Poh's father C. J. Poh. She became close friends with Poh, serving as the chief bridesmaid at the latter's wedding in 1956. As of 2002, she was still meeting up with Poh and Martinus at least once a year. Sinclair married Captain Roy McEwen Sinclair on 30 September 1959. He had been a harbour pilot with the Port Authority of Singapore. He was also of Scottish origin. However, in 1961, she suffered a miscarriage. By 1976, she had become a Permanent Resident of Singapore. The couple left Singapore when Roy retired from the Port Authority in 1981.

By 2002, she was living alone in a flat in Edinburgh. She died there in her sleep on 2 June 2018.
