= Mike Ellery (DJ) =

Singaporean radio host and DJ (1932–2015)

Ellery while at Rediffusion.

Mike Ellery (14 February 1932 – 3 February 2015) was a DJ who was among the most prominent radio personalities in Singapore from the 1950s to the 1980s.

== Early life and education ==
Ellery was born in Bristol, England on 14 February 1932. His father, a Captain with the British Merchant Navy, died in 1939, after which Ellery was sent to live at the Royal Merchant Navy School, a boarding school where he remained until 1948, as her mother could not support him. His mother then found work at a Bristol Aeroplane Company factory, where she established a boarding house for the workers. While there, she met and fell in love with a man who was an engineer who worked at a tin mine in Kuala Kubu Bharu in Selangor, Malaya and who had fled before the Japanese had arrived. After returning from the boarding school, Ellery, who wanted to be an actor, joined the Bristol Old Vic Theatre School.

However, after the end of World War II, Ellery's new stepfather was "caught" and taken back to the mine in Kuala Kubu Bharu. Ellery and his mother accompanied him there, where he remained for a year. His stepfather had wished for Ellery to follow in his footsteps and become an engineer at a tin mine.

== Career ==
In early 1950, during the Malayan Emergency, Ellery came across a job listing in a newspaper by Rediffusion in Kuala Lumpur for a Trainee English Broadcaster. After he was hired, he moved to Kuala Lumpur. His initial pay with Rediffusion was around 250 dollars. Soon after, his boss, Len Thorne, was offered a job at Radio Malaya in Kuala Lumpur. This left Ellery in charge of the English-language programmes at Rediffusion Kuala Lumpur at age 18. However, Thorne later called him to tell him that there was a job vacancy at Radio Malaya, asking Ellery if he would be interested in joining Radio Malaya instead. Ellery accepted the offer. In April 1956, he became the presenter of the newly-established Saturday Date Fan Club, the first radio fan club in the region, in Seremban. In July, The Straits Times radio critic "Mike Watcher" opined that the weekend sports reporting by Ellery and Claude Doral was "really first class".

In early 1957, Vernon Martinus, then the English programmes manager at Rediffusion Singapore, called Ellery to offer him his job as Martinus was leaving Singapore to study ballet in the United Kingdom. Ellery accepted the offer and came to Singapore, assuming the position on 1 March. The Straits Times then described Ellery as a "popular". In addition to broadcasting, he also served as the compère at local stage shows. In 1960, Ellery was offered a job at the Blue Network of Rediffusion Hong Kong as their Head of Television was resigning from the position and he accepted, being replaced at Rediffusion Singapore by Thorne. However, he found working in Hong Kong to be "so awful" and since Thorne was looking to get out of Singapore due to relationship troubles, the two swapped positions again and Ellery returned to Rediffusion Singapore as English programmes manager by December 1962. In 1967, he managed Gino's A-Go-Go, the first discotheque in the country.

In 1970, Ellery and Larry Lai, a colleague of his at Rediffusion, became the first in Singapore to start a mobile disco, which they called the Moby Dick. In this period, he would also moonlight for the Singapore Broadcasting Corporation under the alias "Roger Guest". The disco had been Lai's idea and they were soon joined by DJ Brian Richmond. By the mid-1970s, he was "pissed off" by his boss at Rediffusion. He had been guaranteed a job by a friend of his at the BBC World Service in Britain and his children were looking to further their studies in the United Kingdom so he left with his family for London in around 1976 and 1977. In 1979, Ellery returned to Singapore to found a recording studio with Lai, which they called Sound Lab Studios. In April 1980, he began hosting the Sony-Betamax Show, a television game show sponsored by Sony-Betamax which aired on Channel 5, along with Chris Ho and Susan Ng. In December, RJ of the New Nation opined that Ellery's "handling of the Sony-Betamax Show served notice that we should not tolerate anyone less professional." From 1 January 1982, Ellery began hosting radio programmes on SBC Radio. He appeared in the musical programme Face the Music, which first aired in April. Eventually, Ellery and Lai parted ways due to a "difference in ambition". In 1983, he established Cuevision, an audiovisual consultancy firm which produced corporate videos. He served as the company's general manager.

Ellery "handpicked records for broadcast and subscribed to brand-new American singles weekly". He also introduced the American Top 40 and the Dick Clark Record Show to Singapore. He had a personal preference for the American charts, believing that the British charts were "terrible" and that the artists on the second chart were "pretty noisy". He also hired and mentored fellow Rediffusion DJs Lai, Tan Hock Lye, Tat Swee Leong, Paul Cheong and Chris Ho, as well as Vernon Cornelius of The Quests.

== Personal life and death ==
When Ellery first came to Kuala Lumpur, he stayed at the Hill View Boarding House. While working in Kuala Lumpur, he married a "local girl" with whom he had two children by 1960. Despite living in Singapore for most of his life, he never became a Permanent Resident or a Singaporean citizen. As such, he was forced to leave Singapore when he failed to get his employment pass renewed in 2012. He moved to Thailand as he wished to remain in Asia but eventually, he returned to England on account of ill health. He began living in Heathfield, East Sussex as he wished to be closer to his family.

In June 2014, Ellery suffered a stroke, after which he used a wheelchair. He was then diagnosed with lymphoma in September. On 3 February 2015, he died of cancer. His body was cremated following a funeral.
