= Maudrene Yap =

Singaporean ballerina and teacher (1924–1986)

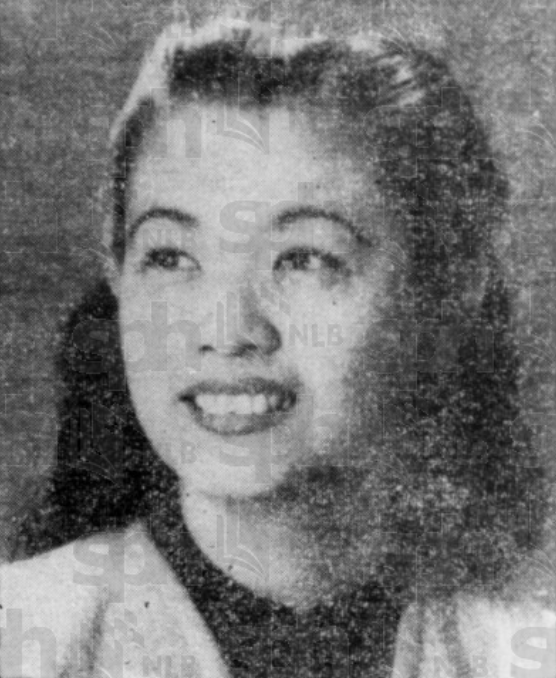
Yap in 1946.

Maudrene Bedell (née Yap; 1924 – 6 November 1986) was a pioneer ballet dancer and teacher in Singapore, active in the 1940s and the 1950s. She was the founder and director of the Maudrene Yap School of Dancing, the first dance school in Singapore established by a local.

== Early life and education ==
Yap was born in Singapore in the 1924. Her father was Yap Pheng Geck, a banker, businessman, civic leader and city councillor. She began taking dance lessons at the age of four. She was "so occupied" by dancing that she "neglected her ordinary school studies." At the opening of the Happy World amusement park on 6 May 1937, Yap danced ballet. By 1938, Yap had become a student of Marcelo Anciano's Far Eastern Music School. She danced at performances staged at the cabarets of the Gay World, New World and Great World amusement parks in March 1939 in aid of the China Relief Fund. Yap and her family evacuated to India just before the beginning of the Japanese Occupation of Singapore in 1942. She began studying at the Woodstock School in Mussoorie, Uttarakhand.

== Career ==
While in India, Yap began working for the United States Transportation Command, the American Economic Administration and the Chinese Technical Commission. She also gave several dance performances. After the end of the occupation in 1945, she and her family returned to Singapore, where she continued to give performances. She began doing radio and cipher work at the Government House, after which she became a "sort of secretary to the A.D.C., helping to deal with a mass of correspondence and with a certain amount of arranging who sat next to whom at dinner parties." Yap then left for London to study at the Phyllis Bedells School of Dancing. Her father had initially wished for her to become a lawyer but eventually agreed to let her pursue dance as a career. By August 1949, she had passed the examinations of the operatic branch of the Royal Academy of Dancing, the Imperial Society of Teachers of Dancing, the National Association of Teachers of Dancing and the International Dancing Masters' Association. Yap was the first of Chinese descent to receive an Advanced Certificate from the Royal Academy of Dancing, and the first to complete the academy's course for teaching. She was then in the midst of one final course which she intended to complete by September before going off on a vacation with her mother across Europe. She returned to Singapore in December with intentions of opening a school for "ballet and physical culture".

Yap established the Maudrene's School of Dance in January 1950, with enrollment beginning 5 January and classes for women and children beginning 16 January. She was the first local to open a school for ballet, which in Singapore was previously the "domain of European expatriates". "Vera Ardmore" of The Malaya Tribune reported that, by August, her school had around 130 students, "ranging from three year-olds to the age which is no longer revealed." She claimed that she wished to form a local ballet company with the students of various ballet schools in Singapore. Yap organised a performance featuring the students of her school, staged in aid of the Singapore Anti-Tuberculosis Association at the Victoria Memorial Hall on 18, 19 and 20 December. The programme also included two piano recitals by Hovita Anciano as well as Yap performing a Spanish dance and ballet for its final item. Malcolm MacDonald, then Commissioner-General for Southeast Asia, was the concert's patron. Yap also designed the costumes for the performance. A dress rehearsal was to be held on 17 December, to which the girls of the Pasir Panjang Girls' Home, the York Hill Home and the Good Shepherd Convent were invited. However, due to the imposing of a curfew over the city, the 18 December performance was cancelled. In a review of the event, critic "N.W." of The Straits Times opined that Singapore "had produced, apart from a competent teacher of dancing, that rarer person, an impresario", praising Yap's "good eye for colour for grouping". In an largely negative review of the performance, "V.F.D." of The Singapore Standard called Yap's two performances "highly-contrasted and convincing" and wrote that they "show[ed] her to be a dancer of considerable talent who should make her mark in Singapore." Shortly after the performance, The Singapore Standard reported that Yap had received an invitation to perform in Bangkok, though she had not yet accepted it.

In 1952, Yap organised another performance for the students of her school, staged at the Victoria Memorial Hall on 17, 18 and 19 April. Around 100 out of 250 students from the school participated in the performance, which, in addition to dances, also featured comic sketches. Yap designed the head-dresses and composed the dances for the performances while the students did the choreography themselves. Her school by then also had male students, described by Ann Reynolds of The Singapore Standard as a "new innovation". MacDonald attended the opening night performance. In 1953, Yap was invited to perform with around 40 of her students at the Lee Theatre in Hong Kong in August. In early 1954, she produced a ballet programme, staged at the Victoria Memorial Hall from 1 to 6 March. She also choreographed for the show's main item, Snow White. By then, her school had around 280 students. After Yap left Singapore in November 1954, Frances Poh took over the school. The school, then renamed the Frances School of Dancing, merged with the Malaya School of Ballet in 1958 to form the Singapore Ballet Academy. The Maudrene Yap School of Dancing was the first in Singapore to have students sit for the Royal Academy of Dance examinations. Ballet dancer Cecilia Hon described Yap as "a living legend, a pioneer, Singapore's first homegrown ballerina" and "the key figure in the history of local ballet as she was the first Singapore woman to attain all the requisite qualifications and the first to open a ballet school here."

== Personal life and death ==
In April 1951, Yap adopted a 2-month-old girl. On 27 November 1954, Yap left for Aden to meet her future husband, engineer and golfer Ken Bedell, who had been stationed there. She had met him at a party, days before he returned to England. However, he was stationed in Singapore four months after. The couple married at the Newport Methodist Church in England in February 1955. Yap travelled to Iraq and Brazil with Bedell when he was stationed in those countries. She had initially planned on opening another dance school, but she became pregnant with her second daughter soon after. Eventually, she and Bedell had three daughters and she decided to quit ballet teaching for good. According to Hon, Yap had expressed "real regret" for retiring at the peak of her career.

Around 1975, Yap had a mastectomy after being diagnosed with breast cancer. However, the disease returned as a bone infection and by August 1983, her right arm was "almost useless" and the right side of her face was "numb". In 1981, her husband died six months after retiring and 14 years after he had been diagnosed with diabetes, suffering from gangrene and having both his legs amputated as a result. At the same time, Yap's illness "came to a head" and she underwent extensive radiotherapy. She was looked after by her second daughter, who stayed with her for two months. She was then living in Harpenden, England. Yap died of cancer on 6 November 1986.
