= National Theatre, Singapore =

Defunct theatre in Singapore

Coordinates: 01°17′34.64″N 103°50′38.91″E

National Theatre
- Panggong Negara (Malay)
- People's Theatre
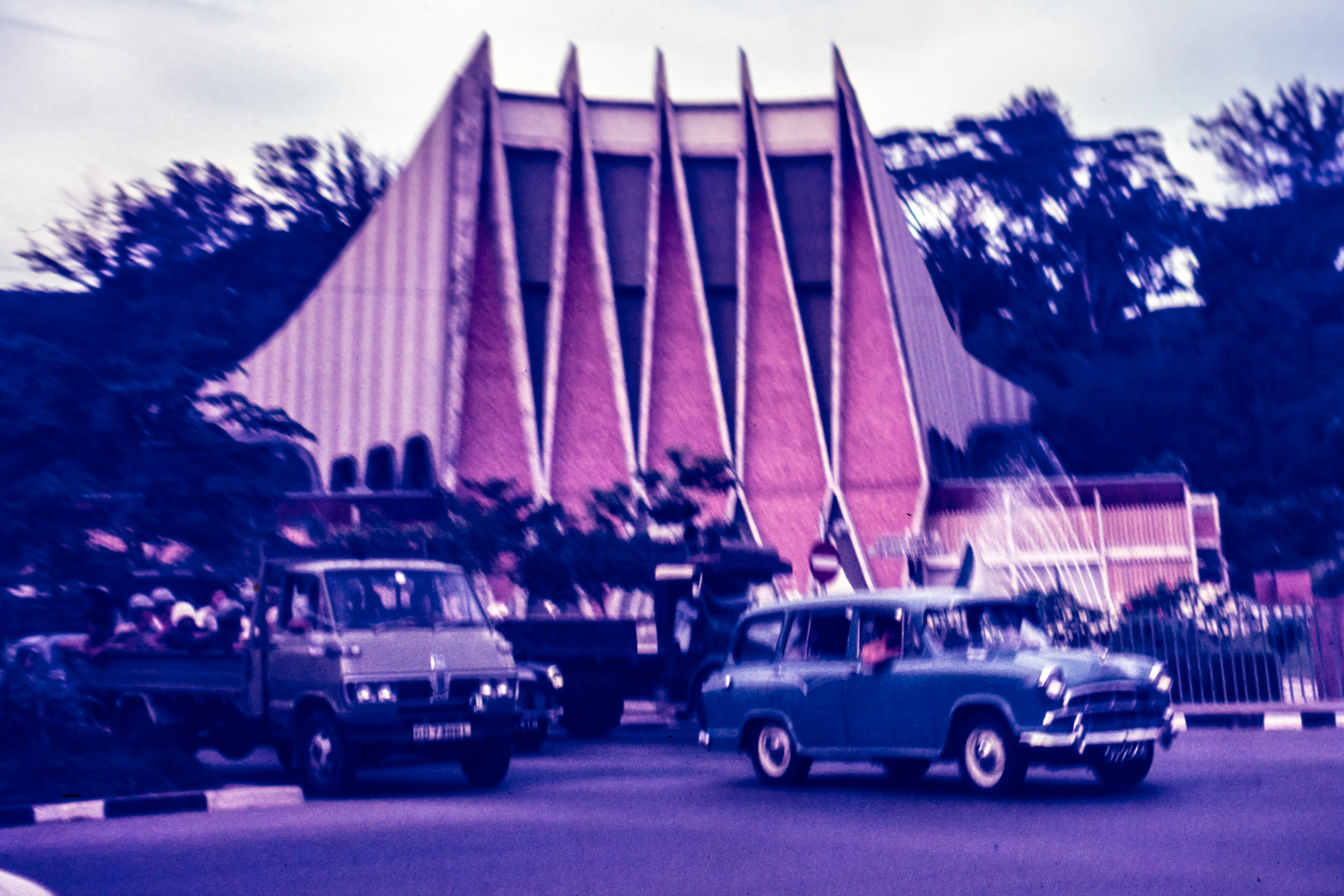
- National Theatre c. 1973–1974

- Location within Singapore
- Address: River Valley Road; Singapore
- Owner: National Theatre Trust
- Operator: National Theatre Trust
- Capacity: 3,420
- Type: National theatre

Construction
- Opened: 8 August 1963; 63 years ago
- Closed: 16 January 1984; 42 years ago
- Demolished: August 1986; 40 years ago
- Years active: 1963–1984
- Architect: Alfred H. K. Wong

The National Theatre (Malay: Panggong Negara; Chinese: 国家剧场) was built on the slope of Fort Canning Park along River Valley Road in the Museum Planning Area of Singapore. The theatre was officially opened on 8 August 1963 to commemorate Singapore's self-governance and was the first and largest national theatre in Singapore back then. It was once the venue for various international performances, universities' convocations and the National Day rallies until it was demolished in August 1986 due to structural reasons and to make way for the nearby construction part of Central Expressway along Clemenceau Avenue.

== History ==
In November 1959, Minister for Culture S. Rajaratnam announced the development of the National Theatre as a permanent structure for both commemorative and specific purposes in Singapore. Admission prices for the first National Loyalty Week to be held in December was contributed to the fund to build the theatre. At the end of the National Loyalty Week, Rajaratnam announced the theatre was to be built at Kallang Park and that the National Theatre, to be built as a national monument, was an affirmation of the people's loyalty to Singapore.

In April 1960, the government decided to move the National Theatre from Kallang Park to King George V Park due to soft ground at the original venue leading to higher construction costs.

Costing S$2.2 million to build, the theatre was designed by local architect Alfred Wong in 1963 after his firm won a design competition to build the first national theatre. It had 3,420 seats and was built with funds jointly donated by the Singapore government and the public through "a-dollar-a-brick" campaign with song requests made on radio. On 14 May 1964, The then Minister for Culture, S Rajaratnam, formally received the keys of the theatre from the company which carried out the construction said: "The theatre provides a good example of how the success of any effort depends ultimately on the co-operation and dedication of people from all walks of life."

=== Closure and demolition ===
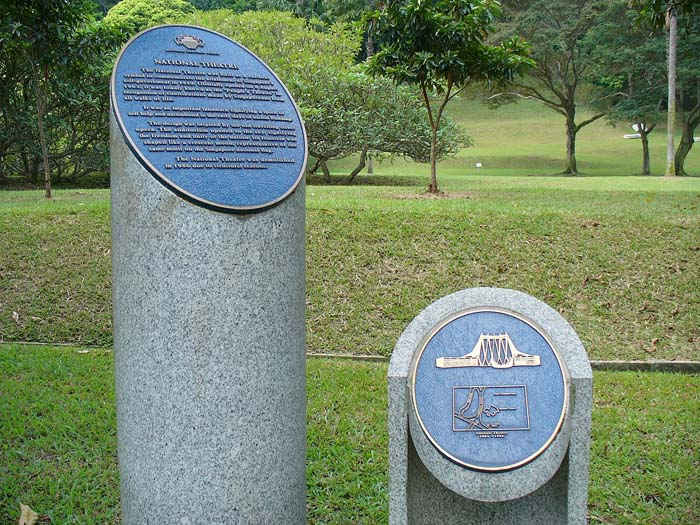
Behind the two heritage markers lies the former site of the National Theatre today

In the early 1980s, the theatre was labelled structurally unsafe due to defects being discovered in its cantilever roof. The proximity of the proposed Central Expressway tunnel to the theatre, coupled with its declining use due to the lack of air-conditioning, led to a government decision to demolish the National Theatre.

The National Theatre held its last performance on 15 January 1984 and closed the next day. The National Theatre Trust moved to the smaller Kallang Theatre in March 1986; demolition works took place between June and August 1986, just as the Kallang Theatre opened to its first performance in June of that year.

Its former site has been marked as a Heritage Site by the National Heritage Board for "signifying a spirit of self help and nationhood in the early days of nation building". The two historical markers were removed to make way for the Fort Canning MRT station, which opened on 21 October 2017.

== Architecture ==
AWP Pte Ltd were the architects of the building with Alfred Wong as the main architect. The theatre's huge 150-tonne (150-long-ton; 170-short-ton) cantilevered steel roof stretched to the slopes of Fort Canning; a five-pointed facade which represented the five stars of the Singapore flag in the same way as its outdoor fountain was supposed to represent the crescent moon. The theatre had no side or rear walls and only the huge roof shielded the audience from the elements. It also had a revolving stage which was rarely used and cost S$10,000 annually to maintain.

== Notable events ==
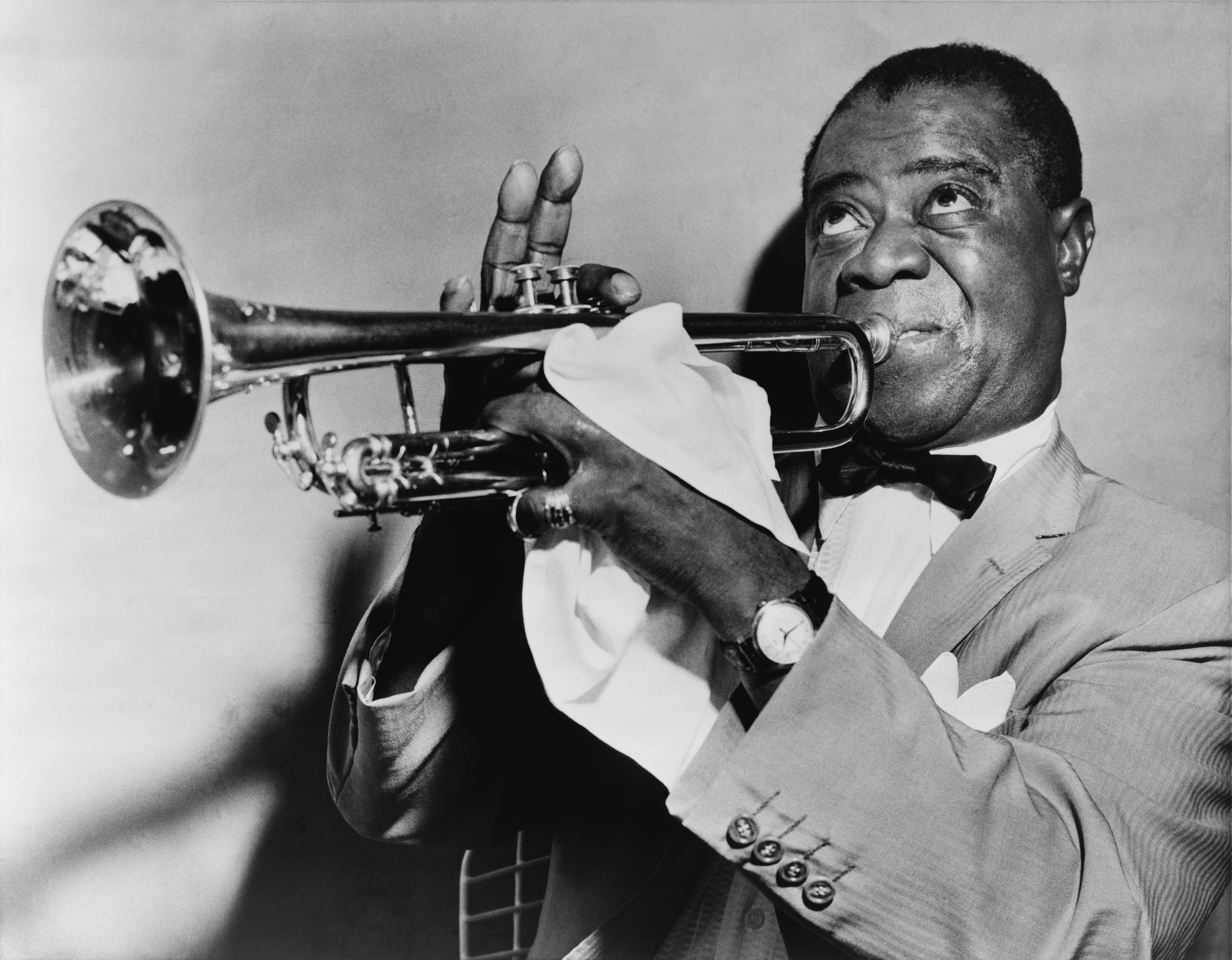
Louis Armstrong was one of the international artists who had performed previously at the Singapore National Theatre

Its first show, the Southeast Asian Cultural Festival, was attended by 11 Asian countries such as princesses from Cambodia, film stars from Hong Kong and folk dancers from neighbouring countries. These performers were taking part for the first time in which the President of Singapore Yusof bin Ishak described the event as a "South-East Asian cultural renaissance".

Many important performances were staged at the National Theatre from 1966 to 1982 with the annual National Day Rally being was held at the theatre too.

In the 1960s and early 1970s, many world-famous and legendary personalities that have performed at the theatre, included the following:

- The Russian Bolshoi Ballet
- The Sadler's Wells Ballet
- The Louis Armstrong Jazz Band
- The Duke Ellington Orchestra
- Woody Herman & his Orchestra
- Johnny Mathis
- Shirley Bassey
- The Bee Gees
- The Hollies
- The Walker Brothers
- The Yardbirds
- Herman's Hermits
- The Shadows

The University of Singapore used to hold their annual convocations at the National Theatre until the early 1980s.

Other notable events such as the Miss Singapore and Mr Universe were regularly held at the National Theatre too.

== See also ==
- Fort Canning Lighthouse
- Old National Library Building
- National Monuments of Singapore
