= Singapore Badminton Hall =

Indoor sports hall in Geylang, Singapore

Coordinates: 1°18′50.4″N 103°52′50.5″E

- Location within Singapore
- Address: 1 Lorong 23 Geylang, Singapore 388352
- Location: Singapore
- Owner: Arina Hogan Builders
- Operator: Arina Hogan Builders
- Acreage: 2,500 square metres (0.25 ha)

Construction
- Opened: 2011

Website
- singaporebadminton.org.sg

The Singapore Badminton Hall (Abbreviation: SBH; Chinese: 新加坡羽毛球馆; pinyin: xīnjiāpō yǔmáoqiúguǎn) is an indoor sports hall for badminton located at 1 Lorong 23 Geylang in Geylang, Singapore.

== Background ==
Three years after the closure of the original Singapore Badminton Hall in 2008, the new Singapore Badminton Hall was opened in 2011 at Lorong 23 Geylang with a land area of 2,500 sqm. The current badminton hall has 14 Olympic-standard courts, and was installed with permanent seatings for 400 spectators, hospitality and VIP viewing galleries, the hall was divided into two sections: with a premier section of six courts in an air-conditioned complex, and a deluxe section of eight courts without air-conditioning. There was also space to erect another 1,400 spectator seats for competitions. Outside the main hall, there is a gymnasium and 14 dormitory rooms for badminton trainees.

It currently serves as a sport venue for badminton trainings and main tournaments like Singapore Badminton Association National Age-group Doubles Championships, the Pilot Pen National Age-group Singles Championships and the Li-Ning Singapore Youth Invitational Series.

== See also ==
- Sport in Singapore
