= Rita Chao =

Singaporean singer and actress (1950–2014)

- Chao in the 1960s

Background information
- Also known as: Ling Yun (凌雲)
- Born: 11 March 1950; Colony of Singapore
- Died: July 2014 (aged 64); Singapore General Hospital, Singapore
- Genres: Pop
- Occupations: Singer; actress
- Years active: 1960s–1980s

Rita Chao (11 March 1950 – July 2014), also known as Ling Yun (Chinese: 凌雲), was a Singaporean former singer and actress. Active in the 1960s and 1970s, she was known for her partnership with fellow singer Sakura Teng. Known for her knee-high boots and miniskirts, together with Teng they were a popular duo known as the A-Go-Go Queens.

In the early 1980s, Chao and Teng broke up following career differences. She retired soon after and led a quieter life, converting to Christianity and working at the Yishun Christian Church. She died on an unspecified date in July 2014 from colon cancer after suffering from it for three years. Her death was only announced by her mother in 2015.

== Early life ==
Chao was born on 11 March 1950 in the Colony of Singapore, the youngest of four sisters and three brothers, to her parents. Of Shanghainese descent, her mother and grandmother were Beijing opera singers. Her first introduction to music was when she was fourteen-years-old, after she joined a singing troupe that her grandmother owned that performed Chinese opera songs, also known as getai. Chao tended to sing pop music instead of the troupe's classical music, stating that "the trend then was towards The Beatles and I don't really like the classical stuff. It is very dull and boring." One of Chao's first performances was at a Chinese revue at New World Amusement Park.

== Career ==
=== Singing career ===
In April 1966, she signed a contract with a recording company and recorded her first song, "Happy Happy Birthday", which quickly became a hit. In 1967, Chao met her future singing partner Sakura Teng at a club in Johor, forming a partnership with her. In December 1967, Chao and Teng won a contract to perform a tour in Hong Kong, Taipei, and Tokyo. Before leaving, they performed a farewell show at the Singapore National Theatre. Their tour was one of the first featuring Singaporean artists travelling to East Asian territories. Together, Chao and Teng were known as the A-Go-Go Queens and sang in Chinese and English. During performances, Chao was known for wearing knee-high boots and miniskirts.

In 1975, Chao sang "Majulah Singapura" alongside Milah Hussain, Sylvia McCully, Kala Puspanathan, and Chong Hoon Sing for a presentation at the ASEAN Exchange Concert in Bangkok. The performance was well-received and garnered multiple accolades. In March 1978, Chao starred, alongside six other Singaporean musicians, on Taiwanese variety programme Big Screen. A team of cameramen, sound recorders, and producers came to Singapore in February and recorded songs from the six musicians in locations around Singapore, including places such as the MacRitchie Reservoir and Chinese Garden. This inclusion of Singaporean singers in Taiwanese programming was stated to be "an unexpected departure from the ordinary" and "could be interpreted as a compliment to Singapore."

Chao and Teng split up in 1981 following a farewell performance in Kuala Lumpur. Their split was due to career differences and was described as "amicable". As of 1971, she released 20 EPs and 7 LPs. Some of Chao's most well-known songs during her career include "Sixteen Candles", "Wooly Bully", "Shake Shake Shake", and "Pretty Flamingo". Together with Teng, their most popular Chinese song was "Peach Blossom River".

=== Acting career ===
In March 1975, Chao went to Hong Kong to make her acting debut after being offered a lead role by director Lo Mar. She starred in Thieves of Thieves (also known as Professional Swindler versus Genius Thief; 1975), playing a girl who sings on the streets to earn money for herself and her grandfather, alongside Singaporean comedy duo Wang Sa and Ye Fong. Later in November 1975, Chao starred in her second film, Crazy Bumpkins in Singapore (1976), a sequel to The Crazy Bumpkins (1974) that was also directed by Mar that starred Sa and Fong.

== Post-career and life ==
In 1989, The Straits Times reported that Chao had converted to Christianity and was now working as a telephone operator at Yishun Christian Church. She lived in a Housing and Development Board flat with her mother in Yishun and described her current job as "very simple" and that it pays "a few hundred dollars and it's enough for me". Chao had converted to Christianity in 1984, following the deaths of her father in 1983 and her grandmother in 1986.

=== Death ===
Chao died on an unspecified day in July 2014 of colon cancer at Singapore General Hospital. She had been suffering from colon cancer for the past three years. Her death was only announced in 2015 by her mother on Lianhe Zaobao because "the family did not inform show business friends as they wanted the past to be forgotten". She was cremated and her ashes were scattered at sea.
