= 7 Assassins =

2013 Chinese-Hong Kong film by Hung Yan-yan

- Film poster
- Traditional Chinese: 光輝歲月
- Simplified Chinese: 光辉岁月
- Hanyu Pinyin: Guāng Huī Suì Yuè
- Jyutping: Gwong1 Fai1 Seoi3 Jyut4
- Directed by: Hung Yan-yan
- Screenplay by: Chun Tin-mam; Moon Zhang; Allun Lam; Wilson Mak
- Produced by: Eric Tsang; Daniel Yu
- Starring: Eric Tsang; Guo Tao; Felix Wong; Well Lee; Yu Oh-seong; Song Xiaobao; Gigi Leung; Ni Hongjie; Hung Yan-yan; Jiao Yang; Max Mok; Guo Jiulong; Rose Chan; Dong Yiwei; Ti Lung; Ray Lui; Shaun Tam; Power Chan; Michael Wong; Waise Lee; Simon Yam; Kara Hui
- Cinematography: Pakie Chan
- Edited by: Marco Mak
- Music by: Henry Lai
- Production companies: Beijing Enlight Pictures; Hong Kong Pictures International; Beijing Cheng Cheng Era International Cultural Development; Shanxi Yangjiajiang Movie & TV Culture; Xiong Xin Xin Production
- Distributed by: Beijing Enlight Pictures
- Release date: 9 June 2013
- Running time: 102 minutes
- Countries: China; Hong Kong
- Languages: Cantonese; Mandarin

7 Assassins (simplified Chinese: 光辉岁月; traditional Chinese: 光輝歲月) is a 2013 martial arts action film directed by Hung Yan-yan and starring an ensemble cast. A Chinese-Hong Kong co-production, producer and star Eric Tsang states the film pays tribute to the Golden Generation of the movie industry.

== Plot ==
Master Mao (Eric Tsang) is a warrior who had participated in the Boxer Rebellion. Mao is responsible for guarding Huang Jin Xia town, which have gathered many revolutionaries around China. There, they do not discuss about revolution nor care about politics and lead peaceful lives. Xilian (Gigi Leung), a woman who was rescued by Mao, is oblivious that years ago, Mao not only rescued her and her child, he also rescued her heart.

Revolutionary Tieyun (Felix Wong) and his like-minded comrades raid a desert and smuggle gold there, preparing to purchase firearms for another uprising. During their way, they were ambushed by Man Tianhong (Ni Hongjie), the Prince of Pok Yee Kak. During the critical moment, they were fortunately rescued by the sincere official Governor Zhuo (Ti Lung). Zhuo is visionary and believes that fate the country lies on Tieyun. Zhuo arranges for Tieyun to go to Huang Jin Xia to meet the heroic Master Mao. But with the arrival of Tieyun, Huang Jin Xia's peaceful environment was broken, and the retired revolutionaries once again display their heroism and fight for the dignity of the country.

== Cast ==
- Eric Tsang as Master Mao (貓老板)
- Felix Wong as Tieyun (鐵雲)
- Gigi Leung as Xilian (細簾)
- Yoo Oh-seong as Wu Zhong-e (武忠額)
- Guo Tao as Liu Aotian (柳傲天)
- Ni Hongjie as Man Tianhong (滿天紅)
- Rose Chan as Liu Xu (柳絮)
- Ray Lui as The Prince (親王)
- Max Mok as Chan Mu-bai (慕白)
- Shaun Tam as Shigen (石根)
- Power Chan as Xiaoye (小葉) (credited as Chan Kwok Pong)
- Hung Yan-yan as Wuchou (無仇) a descendant from the Taiping Kingdom (credited as Xiong Xin Xin)
- Well Lee as Anle (安樂)
- Zhang En Ke as Enke
- Zhang En Qi as Enqi
- Du Tian Yu as Gou-er
- Simon Yam as Laohu (老胡) a pawnshop owner
- Kara Hui as Laohu's Wife (胡妻)
- Ti Lung as Governor Zhuo (卓知府)
- Waise Lee as Captain Wang (汪捕頭) under Governor Zhuo
- Michael Wong as Peter Fang (方彼得)
- Cheung Kwok-keung as Villager of Golden Valley
- Cherie Chan as Villager of Golden Valley
- Mars as Villager of Golden Valley
- Ellen Chan as Madam Xishi (西施姐)
- Ben Ng as Nam (阿南), a Revolutionist (義士)
- Jason Lau as Revolutionist (義士)
- Bryan Leung as Laochen (老陳), a biscuit seller (credited as Leung Ka Yan)
- Chen Kuan-tai as Brother Tai (credited as Chan Koon Tai), a Revolutionist (義士)
- Fung Hark-On as Brother Ke, a Revolutionist (義士), (credited as Fung Hak On)
- Tony Liu as Revolutionist (credited as Antony Lau)
- Lawrence Ng as Revolutionist (義士)
- Song Xiaobao as Er Dangjia
- Guo Jiu Long as Master Qi (七大爺)
- Jiao Yang as Shigen's Wife
- Dong Yi Wei as Governor Zhuo's Wife
- Michael Tong as Tanglong (唐龍)
- Dick Wei as Adjutant (副官) (credited as Tu Chi Lung)
- Ken Lo as Adjutant (副官) (credited as Low Houi Kang)
- Chang Di as Adjutant (副官)
- Guo Yun Qiang as Adjutant (副官)
- Edward Chui as Xiaoliuzi
- Qin Tian Xuan as Jinfa
- Hui Dong Qing as Villager
- Choy Kwok Ping as Villager
- Lv Jia Sheng as Villager
- Hao Guo Dong as Governor Zhuo's Son

== Theme song ==
- "Glory Days" (光輝歲月)
  - Composer/Lyricist/Original singer: Wong Ka Kui
  - Singer: Eason Chan
