= September 5 =

September 5 this year in various calendars
- Saturday, 5 September 2026
Akan	Kurumemene
Armenian	17 Hoṙi 1476
Aztec	Atemoztli 18, 5 Miquiztli
Babylonian	22 Abu, 2337 SE
Balinese pawukon	Luang, Pepet, Pasah, Menala, Keliwon, Paniron, Saniscara of Uye, Uma, Urungan, Raja
Bengali	21 Bhadro, BS 1433
Chinese	Yang Water Horse・Stomach Mansion; Fire Horse Year, Month 7, Day 24 (Chushu, 2 days until Bailu)
Common Era	5 September 2026 CE
Coptic	30 Mesori, AM 1742
Egyptian	22 Tybi, 2775 NE
Ethiopian	30 Naḥasē, 2018 Amätä Məhrät
French Republican	Décade II, Nonidi de Fructidor de l'Année 234 de la République
Gregorian	5 September, AD 2026
Hebrew	23 Elul, AM 5786
Hindu	Mṛgaśiras・Vajra; Solar: 20 Bhādrapada, 1948 SE; Lunisolar: Navamī, Kṛishna pakṣa of Śrāvaṇa, 2083 VE; Rāudra・5127 KY・1,872,823
Icelandic	Laugardagur, 12 Tvímánuður 2026
Islamic	22 Rabi' al-awwal, AH 1448 (using tabular method)
ISO week date	2026-W36-6
Japanese	24 Fumizuki, Reiwa 8 (Shosho, 2 days until Hakuro)
Julian	23 August, AD 2026 (AM 7534)
Julian day	2461289
Korean	24 Wonsungidal, 4359 DE
Maya	13.0.13.16.6; 19 Mol, 5 Cimi
Roman	ante diem X Kalendas Septembres, MMDCCLXXIX AUC
Solar Hijri	14 Shahrivar, SH 1405
Tibetan	24 gro bzhin, me pho rta 2153 or 1772 or 1000

<<	September					>>
Su	Mo	Tu	We	Th	Fr	Sa
		1	2	3	4	5
6	7	8	9	10	11	12
13	14	15	16	17	18	19
20	21	22	23	24	25	26
27	28	29	30
2026

September 5 in recent years
2026 (Saturday)
2025 (Friday)
2024 (Thursday)
2023 (Tuesday)
2022 (Monday)
2021 (Sunday)
2020 (Saturday)
2019 (Thursday)
2018 (Wednesday)
2017 (Tuesday)

September 5 is the 248th day of the year (249th in leap years) in the Gregorian calendar; 117 days remain until the end of the year.

== Events ==
=== Pre-1600 ===
- 394 – On the first day of the battle of Frigidus, the Western Roman troops of Arbogast manage to defend their positions against the Eastern Roman troops of emperor Theodosius I.
- 917 – Liu Yan declares himself emperor, establishing the Southern Han state in southern China, at his capital of Panyu.
- 1234 – The Decretals of Gregory IX, a new canonical collection assembled by Raymond of Peñafort, are promulgated.
- 1367 – Swa Saw Ke becomes king of Ava
- 1590 – An army led by Alexander Farnese, Duke of Parma forces Henry IV of France to lift the siege of Paris.

=== 1601–1900 ===
- 1661 – Fall of Nicolas Fouquet: Louis XIV's Superintendent of Finances is arrested in Nantes by D'Artagnan, captain of the king's musketeers.
- 1697 – War of the Grand Alliance: A French warship commanded by Captain Pierre Le Moyne d'Iberville defeats an English squadron at the Battle of Hudson's Bay.
- 1698 – In an effort to Westernize his nobility, Tsar Peter I of Russia imposes a tax on beards for all men except the clergy and peasantry.
- 1725 – Wedding of Louis XV and Maria Leszczyńska.
- 1774 – First Continental Congress assembles in Philadelphia.
- 1781 – Battle of the Chesapeake in the American Revolutionary War: The British Navy is repelled by the French Navy, contributing to the British surrender at Yorktown.
- 1791 – Olympe de Gouges writes the Declaration of the Rights of Woman and of the Female Citizen.
- 1793 – French Revolution: The French National Convention initiates the Reign of Terror.
- 1798 – Conscription is made mandatory in France by the Jourdan law.
- 1812 – War of 1812: The Siege of Fort Wayne begins when Chief Winamac's forces attack two soldiers returning from the fort's outhouses.
- 1816 – Louis XVIII of France has to dissolve the Chambre introuvable ("Unobtainable Chamber").
- 1836 – Sam Houston is elected as the first president of the Republic of Texas.
- 1839 – The United Kingdom declares war on the Qing dynasty of China.
- 1862 – American Civil War: The Army of Northern Virginia crosses the Potomac River at White's Ford in the Maryland Campaign.
- 1877 – American Indian Wars: Oglala Sioux chief Crazy Horse is bayoneted by a United States soldier after resisting confinement in a guardhouse at Fort Robinson in Nebraska.
- 1882 – The first United States Labor Day parade is held in New York City.
- 1887 – A fire at the Theatre Royal, Exeter kills 186, making it the UK's deadliest ever building fire.

=== 1901–present ===
- 1905 – Russo-Japanese War: In New Hampshire, United States, the Treaty of Portsmouth, mediated by U.S. President Theodore Roosevelt, ends the war.
- 1914 – World War I: First Battle of the Marne begins. Northeast of Paris, the French attack and defeat German forces who are advancing on the capital.
- 1915 – The pacifist Zimmerwald Conference begins.
- 1932 – The French Upper Volta is broken apart between Ivory Coast, French Sudan, and Niger.
- 1937 – Spanish Civil War: Llanes falls to the Nationalists following a one-day siege.
- 1938 – Chile: A group of youths affiliated with the fascist National Socialist Movement of Chile are executed after surrendering during a failed coup.
- 1941 – Whole territory of Estonia is occupied by Nazi Germany.
- 1942 – World War II: Japanese high command orders withdrawal at Milne Bay, the first major Japanese defeat in land warfare during the Pacific War.
- 1943 – World War II: In the Pacific Theater, the 503rd Parachute Infantry Regiment lands and occupies Lae Nadzab Airport, near Lae during the Salamaua–Lae campaign.
- 1944 – Belgium, Netherlands and Luxembourg constitute Benelux.
- 1945 – Cold War: Igor Gouzenko, a Soviet Union embassy clerk, defects to Canada, exposing Soviet espionage in North America, signalling the beginning of the Cold War.
- 1945 – Iva Toguri D'Aquino, a Japanese American who broadcast under the name Orphan Annie during World War II, is arrested in Yokohama by U.S. military authorities amid widespread speculation of her being wartime radio propagandist Tokyo Rose.
- 1948 – In France, Robert Schuman becomes President of the Council while being Foreign minister; as such, he is the French negotiator of the major treaties of the end of World War II.
- 1954 – KLM Flight 633 crashes into the River Shannon in Shannon, County Clare, Ireland, killing 28.
- 1957 – Cuban Revolution: Fulgencio Batista bombs the revolt in Cienfuegos.
- 1960 – Poet Léopold Sédar Senghor is the first elected President of Senegal.
- 1960 – Muhammad Ali (then known as Cassius Clay) wins the gold medal in the light heavyweight boxing competition at the Olympic Games in Rome.
- 1968 – End of the Congress of Carrara, one of the major 20th century anarchist congresses.
- 1969 – Mỹ Lai Massacre: U.S. Army Lieutenant William Calley is charged with six specifications of premeditated murder for the death of 109 Vietnamese civilians in My Lai.
- 1970 – Vietnam War: Operation Jefferson Glenn begins: The United States 101st Airborne Division and the South Vietnamese 1st Infantry Division initiate a new operation in Thừa Thiên–Huế Province.
- 1972 – Munich massacre: A Palestinian terrorist group called "Black September" attacks and takes hostage 11 Israeli athletes at the Munich Olympic Games. Two die in the attack and nine are murdered the following day.
- 1975 – Sacramento, California: Lynette Fromme attempts to assassinate U.S. President Gerald Ford.
- 1977 – Voyager Program: NASA launches the Voyager 1 spacecraft.
- 1978 – Camp David Accords: Menachem Begin and Anwar Sadat begin peace discussions at Camp David, Maryland.
- 1980 – The Gotthard Road Tunnel opens in Switzerland as the world's longest highway tunnel at 16.9 kilometres (10.5 mi) stretching from Göschenen to Airolo.
- 1981 – The first women arrive at what becomes Greenham Common Women's Peace Camp in the UK.
- 1984 – STS-41-D: The Space Shuttle Discovery lands after its maiden voyage.
- 1984 – Western Australia becomes the last Australian state to abolish capital punishment.
- 1986 – Pan Am Flight 73 from Mumbai, India with 358 people on board is hijacked at Karachi International Airport.
- 1990 – Sri Lankan Civil War: Sri Lankan Army soldiers slaughter 158 civilians.
- 1991 – The current international treaty defending indigenous peoples, Indigenous and Tribal Peoples Convention, 1989, comes into force.
- 1996 – Hurricane Fran makes landfall near Cape Fear, North Carolina as a Category 3 storm with 115 mph sustained winds. Fran caused over $3 billion in damage and killed 27 people.
- 2005 – Mandala Airlines Flight 091 crashes after takeoff from Polonia International Airport in Medan, Indonesia, killing 149.
- 2006 – The Waziristan Accord is signed between the Government of Pakistan and local Taliban militants in North Waziristan, obliging the Taliban to expel foreign jihadists and the government to compensate the tribes for loss of life and property and launch reconstruction projects.
- 2012 – An accidental explosion at a Turkish Army ammunition store in Afyon, western Turkey kills 25 soldiers and wounds four others.
- 2021 – The President of Guinea, Alpha Condé is captured by armed forces during a coup d'état.
- 2022 – Liz Truss is declared the winner of the UK Conservative Party leadership election, beating Rishi Sunak.
- 2022 – At least 93 people die and 25 are missing after a magnitude 6.8 earthquake strikes Sichuan, China.

== Births ==
=== Pre-1600 ===
- 989 – Fan Zhongyan, Chinese chancellor (died 1052)
- 1187 – Louis VIII, king of France (died 1226)
- 1201 – Alix of Thouars, duchess of Brittany (died 1221)
- 1269 – Agnes of Bohemia, Duchess of Austria (died 1296)
- 1319 – Peter IV, king of Aragon (died 1387)
- 1451 – Isabel Neville, daughter of Richard Neville (died 1476)
- 1500 – Maria of Jever, ruler of the Lordship of Jever (died 1575)
- 1533 – Jacopo Zabarella, Italian philosopher and logician (died 1589)
- 1540 – Magnus of Holstein, prince of Denmark (died 1583)
- 1567 – Date Masamune, Japanese daimyō (died 1636)
- 1568 – Tommaso Campanella, Italian poet, philosopher, and theologian (died 1639)

=== 1601–1900 ===
- 1638 – Louis XIV, king of France (died 1715)
- 1641 – Robert Spencer, 2nd Earl of Sunderland, English diplomat (died 1702)
- 1642 – Maria of Orange-Nassau, Dutch princess (died 1688)
- 1651 – William Dampier, English explorer (died 1715)
- 1666 – Gottfried Arnold, German historian and theologian (died 1714)
- 1667 – Giovanni Girolamo Saccheri, Italian priest, mathematician, and philosopher (died 1733)
- 1694 – František Václav Míča, Czech conductor and composer (died 1744)
- 1695 – Carl Gustaf Tessin, Swedish politician and diplomat (died 1770)
- 1722 – Frederick Christian, Prince-Elector of Saxony (died 1763)
- 1725 – Jean-Étienne Montucla, French mathematician and theorist (died 1799)
- 1735 – Johann Christian Bach, German-English viol player and composer (died 1782)
- 1750 – Robert Fergusson, Scottish poet and author (died 1774)
- 1769 – John Shortland, English commander (died 1810)
- 1771 – Archduke Charles, Duke of Teschen (died 1847)
- 1772 – Fath-Ali Shah Qajar, Iranian king (died 1834)
- 1774 – Caspar David Friedrich, German painter and etcher (died 1840)
- 1775 – Juan Martín Díez, Spanish general (died 1825)
- 1781 – Anton Diabelli, Austrian composer and publisher (died 1858)
- 1787 – François Sulpice Beudant, French mineralogist and geologist (died 1850)
- 1791 – Giacomo Meyerbeer, German pianist and composer (died 1864)
- 1792 – Ours-Pierre-Armand Petit-Dufrénoy, French geologist and mineralogist (died 1857)
- 1806 – Christophe Léon Louis Juchault de Lamoricière, French general and politician, French Minister of War (died 1865)
- 1817 – Aleksey Konstantinovich Tolstoy, Russian poet, author, and playwright (died 1875)
- 1818 – Edmund Kennedy, Australian explorer and surveyor (died 1848)
- 1826 – John Wisden, English cricketer and businessman (died 1884)
- 1827 – Goffredo Mameli, Italian poet and songwriter (died 1849)
- 1829 – Lester Allan Pelton, American inventor (died 1908)
- 1831 – Victorien Sardou, French author and playwright (died 1908)
- 1833 – George Huntington Hartford, American businessman (died 1917)
- 1836 – Justiniano Borgoño, Peruvian soldier and politician, 57th President of Peru (died 1921)
- 1847 – Jesse James, American outlaw (died 1882)
- 1850 – Eugen Goldstein, German physicist (died 1930)
- 1856 – Thomas E. Watson, American lawyer, publisher, and politician (died 1922)
- 1867 – Amy Beach, American pianist and composer (died 1944)
- 1871 – Friedrich Akel, Estonian physician and politician, Head of State of Estonia (d 1941)
- 1872 – V. O. Chidambaram Pillai, Indian lawyer and politician (died 1936)
- 1872 – Horace Rice, Australian tennis player (died 1950)
- 1873 – Cornelius Vanderbilt III, American general and engineer (died 1942)
- 1874 – Nap Lajoie, American baseball player and manager (died 1959)
- 1876 – Wilhelm Ritter von Leeb, German field marshal (died 1956)
- 1880 – José María of Manila, Spanish-Filipino priest and martyr (died 1936)
- 1881 – Otto Bauer, Austrian philosopher and politician, Foreign Minister of Austria (died 1938)
- 1881 – Henry Maitland Wilson, 1st Baron Wilson, English field marshal (died 1964)
- 1883 – Otto Erich Deutsch, Austrian musicologist and scholar (died 1967)
- 1888 – Sarvepalli Radhakrishnan, Indian philosopher and politician, 2nd President of India (died 1975)
- 1892 – Joseph Szigeti, Hungarian violinist and educator (died 1973)
- 1897 – Morris Carnovsky, American actor (died 1992)
- 1897 – Arthur Nielsen, American market analyst, founded ACNielsen (died 1980)
- 1899 – Humphrey Cobb, American author and screenwriter (died 1944)
- 1899 – Helen Creighton, Canadian author and educator (died 1989)
- 1899 – Max Bishop, American baseball player (died 1962)

=== 1901–present ===
- 1901 – Florence Eldridge, American actress (died 1988)
- 1901 – Mario Scelba, Italian politician, 33rd Prime Minister of Italy (died 1991)
- 1902 – Jean Dalrymple, American playwright, producer, manager, and publicist (died 1998)
- 1902 – Darryl F. Zanuck, American actor, director, producer, and screenwriter (died 1979)
- 1904 – Vera Bradford, Australian pianist and educator (died 2004)
- 1905 – Maurice Challe, French general (died 1979)
- 1905 – Arthur Koestler, Hungarian-English journalist and author (died 1983)
- 1905 – Justiniano Montano, Filipino lawyer and politician (died 2005)
- 1906 – Ralston Crawford, American painter, lithographer, and photographer (died 1978)
- 1906 – Sunnyland Slim, American singer-songwriter and pianist (died 1995)
- 1908 – Josué de Castro, Brazilian physician, geographer, and activist (died 1973)
- 1908 – Joaquín Nin-Culmell, German-American pianist and composer (died 2004)
- 1908 – Cecilia Seghizzi, Italian composer and painter (died 2019)
- 1908 – Renzo Rivolta, Italian engineer (died 1966)
- 1909 – Hans Carste, German pianist and conductor (died 1971)
- 1909 – Bernard Delfont, Russian-English talent manager (died 1994)
- 1909 – Archie Jackson, Scottish-Australian cricketer (died 1933)
- 1910 – Leila Mackinlay, English author (died 1996)
- 1910 – Phiroze Palia, Indian cricketer (died 1981)
- 1912 – John Cage, American composer and theorist (died 1992)
- 1912 – Kristina Söderbaum, Swedish-German actress and photographer (died 2001)
- 1912 – Frank Thomas, American voice actor, animator, and screenwriter (died 2004)
- 1914 – Stuart Freeborn, English make up artist (died 2013)
- 1914 – Gail Kubik, American violinist, composer, and educator (died 1984)
- 1914 – Nicanor Parra, Chilean physicist, mathematician, and poet (died 2018)
- 1916 – Frank Shuster, Canadian comedian, actor, and screenwriter (died 2002)
- 1916 – Frank Yerby, American novelist (died 1991)
- 1917 – Pedro E. Guerrero, American photographer (died 2012)
- 1917 – Sören Nordin, Swedish harness racer and trainer (died 2008)
- 1918 – Luis Alcoriza, Mexican actor, director, and screenwriter (died 1992)
- 1918 – Bob Katter, Sr., Australian captain and politician (died 1990)
- 1918 – Fred McCarthy, American cartoonist and monk (died 2009)
- 1919 – Elisabeth Volkenrath, German SS officer and executed war criminal (died 1945)
- 1920 – Peter Racine Fricker, English-American composer and educator (died 1990)
- 1920 – Fons Rademakers, Dutch-Swiss actor, director, producer, and screenwriter (died 2007)
- 1921 – Murray Henderson, Canadian ice hockey player and coach (died 2013)
- 1921 – Jack Valenti, American businessman, created the MPAA film rating system (died 2007)
- 1922 – Denys Wilkinson, English physicist and academic (died 2016)
- 1923 – David Hamer, Australian captain and politician (died 2002)
- 1923 – Ken Meuleman, Australian cricketer (died 2004)
- 1924 – Paul Dietzel, American football player and coach (died 2013)
- 1924 – Frank Armitage, Australian-American artist (died 2016)
- 1925 – Justin Kaplan, American author (died 2014)
- 1926 – Carmen Petra Basacopol, Romanian composer, pianist and musicologist (died 2023)
- 1927 – Paul Volcker, American economist and academic (died 2019)
- 1928 – Joyce Hatto, English pianist and educator (died 2006)
- 1928 – Albert Mangelsdorff, German trombonist and educator (died 2005)
- 1929 – Bob Newhart, American comedian and actor (died 2024)
- 1929 – Andriyan Nikolayev, Russian general, pilot, and cosmonaut (died 2004)
- 1932 – Carol Lawrence, American actress and singer
- 1932 – Robert H. Dennard, American electrical engineer and inventor (died 2024)
- 1933 – Francisco Javier Errázuriz Ossa, Chilean cardinal
- 1934 – Paul Josef Cordes, German cardinal (died 2024)
- 1934 – Dennis Letts, American actor and educator (died 2008)
- 1934 – Kevin McNamara, English politician, Shadow Secretary of State for Northern Ireland (died 2017)
- 1935 – Werner Erhard, American author and philanthropist, founded Werner Erhard and Associates and The Hunger Project
- 1935 – Helen Gifford, Australian composer and educator
- 1935 – Lucille Soong, Chinese-American actress
- 1936 – Robert Burns, Canadian lawyer and politician (died 2014)
- 1936 – John Danforth, American politician and diplomat, 24th United States Ambassador to the United Nations
- 1936 – Jonathan Kozol, American sociologist, author, and educator
- 1936 – Bill Mazeroski, American baseball player and coach (died 2026)
- 1936 – Knuts Skujenieks, Latvian poet, journalist, and translator (died 2022)
- 1937 – Antonio Valentín Angelillo, Argentine footballer and manager (died 2018)
- 1937 – Dick Clement, English director, producer, and screenwriter
- 1938 – John Ferguson, Sr., Canadian ice hockey player, coach, and manager (died 2007)
- 1938 – Doreen Massey, Baroness Massey of Darwen, English politician (died 2024)
- 1939 – Claudette Colvin, American nurse and activist (died 2026)
- 1939 – William Devane, American actor, director, and screenwriter
- 1939 – George Lazenby, Australian actor, the second to play James Bond
- 1939 – John Stewart, American singer-songwriter and guitarist (died 2008)
- 1939 – George Tremlett, English journalist, author, and politician (died 2021)
- 1940 – Valerie Howarth, Baroness Howarth of Breckland, English politician
- 1940 – Raquel Welch, American actress and singer (died 2023)
- 1941 – Dave Dryden, Canadian ice hockey player and coach (died 2022)
- 1942 – Werner Herzog, German actor, director, producer, and screenwriter
- 1942 – Eduardo Mata, Mexican conductor and composer (died 1995)
- 1943 – Dulce Saguisag, Filipino social worker and politician, 10th Filipino Secretary of Social Welfare and Development (died 2007)
- 1944 – Dario Bellezza, Italian poet, author, and playwright (died 1996)
- 1944 – Gareth Evans, Australian lawyer, politician and the 33rd Australian Minister of Foreign Affairs
- 1945 – Eva Bergman, Swedish director and screenwriter
- 1945 – Al Stewart, Scottish singer-songwriter and guitarist
- 1946 – Kyongae Chang, South Korean astrophysicist and academic
- 1946 – Dennis Dugan, American actor and director
- 1946 – Dean Ford, Scottish singer-songwriter and guitarist (died 2018)
- 1946 – Freddie Mercury, British singer and songwriter (died 1991)
- 1946 – Loudon Wainwright III, American singer-songwriter, guitarist, and actor
- 1947 – Mel Collins, Manx saxophonist and flute player
- 1947 – Chip Davis, American pianist, songwriter, and producer
- 1947 – Buddy Miles, American singer-songwriter and drummer (died 2008)
- 1947 – Bruce Yardley, Australian cricketer and sportscaster (died 2019)
- 1948 – Benita Ferrero-Waldner, Austrian lawyer, politician, and diplomat, Foreign Minister of Austria
- 1949 – Clem Clempson, English guitarist and songwriter
- 1950 – Rosie Cooper, English businesswoman and politician
- 1950 – Cathy Guisewite, American cartoonist, created Cathy
- 1951 – Paul Breitner, German footballer
- 1951 – Michael Keaton, American actor and producer
- 1951 – Jamie Oldaker, American drummer and percussionist (died 2020)
- 1952 – David Glen Eisley, American rock singer-songwriter and actor
- 1953 – Victor Davis Hanson, American historian and journalist
- 1953 – Murray Mexted, New Zealand rugby player and sportscaster
- 1953 – Eiki Nestor, Estonian engineer and politician, Estonian Minister of Social Affairs
- 1953 – Paul Piché, Canadian singer-songwriter
- 1954 – Richard Austin, Jamaican footballer and cricketer (died 2015)
- 1954 – Frederick Kempe, American journalist and author
- 1955 – Stan Jonathan, Canadian ice hockey player
- 1956 – Low Thia Khiang, Singaporean businessman and politician
- 1956 – Roine Stolt, Swedish singer-songwriter, guitarist, and producer
- 1956 – Debbie Turner, American actress
- 1957 – Rudi Gores, German footballer and manager
- 1957 – Peter Winnen, Dutch cyclist
- 1958 – Lars Danielsson, Swedish bassist, composer, and producer
- 1958 – Don Maloney, Canadian ice hockey player and executive
- 1959 – Frank Schirrmacher, German journalist and publisher (died 2014)
- 1960 – Willie Gault, American football player, athlete, and actor
- 1960 – Don Kulick, Swedish anthropologist and academic
- 1960 – Candy Maldonado, Puerto Rican baseball player
- 1961 – Marc-André Hamelin, Canadian pianist and composer
- 1962 – Tracy Edwards, English sailor and coach
- 1962 – John McGrath, Welsh businessman
- 1963 – Juan Alderete, American bass player and songwriter
- 1963 – Kristian Alfonso, American actress and model
- 1963 – Jeff Brantley, American baseball player and sportscaster
- 1963 – Terry Ellis, American R&B singer–songwriter and actress
- 1963 – Taki Inoue, Japanese race car driver and manager
- 1964 – Frank Farina, Australian footballer and manager
- 1964 – Sergei Loznitsa, Belarusian-Ukrainian director and screenwriter
- 1964 – Ken Norman, American basketball player
- 1964 – Thomas Mikal Ford, American actor (died 2016)
- 1965 – David Brabham, Australian race car driver
- 1965 – Hoshitango Imachi, Japanese wrestler
- 1965 – Nick Talbot, English geneticist and academic
- 1966 – Achero Mañas, Spanish actor, director, and screenwriter
- 1966 – Milinko Pantić, Serbian footballer and manager
- 1967 – Matthias Sammer, German footballer and manager
- 1967 – Jane Sixsmith, English field hockey player
- 1968 – Serhiy Kovalets, Ukrainian footballer and manager
- 1968 – Dennis Scott, American basketball player and sportscaster
- 1968 – Robin van der Laan, Dutch footballer and coach
- 1968 – Brad Wilk, American singer-songwriter and drummer
- 1969 – Leonardo Araújo, Brazilian footballer and manager
- 1969 – Mariko Kouda, Japanese voice actress, singer, and radio host
- 1969 – Mark Ramprakash, English cricketer and coach
- 1969 – Dweezil Zappa, American actor and musician
- 1970 – Liam Lynch, American singer-songwriter, guitarist, puppeteer, and director
- 1970 – Mohammad Rafique, Bangladeshi cricketer
- 1970 – Gilbert Remulla, Filipino journalist and politician
- 1970 – Johnny Vegas, English actor, director, producer, and screenwriter
- 1971 – Adam Hollioake, Australian cricketer and mixed martial artist
- 1972 – Guy Whittall, Zimbabwean cricketer
- 1973 – Paddy Considine, English actor, director, and screenwriter
- 1973 – Rose McGowan, American actress
- 1974 – Lauren Jeska, British fell runner convicted of the attempted murder of Ralph Knibbs
- 1974 – Ken-Marti Vaher, Estonian politician, Estonian Minister of the Interior
- 1975 – George Boateng, Dutch footballer and manager
- 1975 – Randy Choate, American baseball player
- 1975 – Rod Barajas, American baseball player and coach
- 1976 – Tatiana Gutsu, Ukrainian gymnast
- 1976 – Carice van Houten, Dutch actress and singer
- 1977 – Joseba Etxeberria, Spanish footballer
- 1977 – Nazr Mohammed, American basketball player
- 1978 – Chris Hipkins, New Zealand politician, 41st Prime Minister of New Zealand
- 1978 – Chris Jack, New Zealand rugby player
- 1978 – Sylvester Joseph, Antiguan cricketer
- 1978 – Zhang Zhong, Chinese chess player
- 1979 – John Carew, Norwegian footballer
- 1979 – Julien Lizeroux, French skier
- 1979 – Salvatore Mastronunzio, Italian footballer
- 1980 – Franco Costanzo, Argentine footballer
- 1981 – Daniel Moreno, Spanish cyclist
- 1981 – Kai Rüütel, Estonian opera singer
- 1983 – Eugen Bopp, Ukrainian-German footballer
- 1983 – Pablo Granoche, Uruguayan footballer
- 1983 – Chris Young, American baseball player
- 1984 – Alison Bell, Scottish field hockey player
- 1984 – Chris Anker Sørensen, Danish cyclist (died 2021)
- 1984 – Annabelle Wallis, English actress
- 1985 – Justin Dentmon, American basketball player
- 1985 – Ryan Guy, American soccer player
- 1986 – Pragyan Ojha, Indian cricketer
- 1988 – Denni Avdić, Swedish footballer
- 1988 – Felipe Caicedo, Ecuadorian footballer
- 1988 – Emmy Raver-Lampman, American actress and singer
- 1989 – Elena Delle Donne, American basketball player
- 1989 – Kat Graham, American actress and singer
- 1989 – Craig Smith, American ice hockey player
- 1989 – José Ángel Valdés, Spanish footballer
- 1989 – Ben Youngs, English rugby player
- 1990 – Lance Stephenson, American basketball player
- 1990 – Yuna Kim, South Korean figure skater
- 1990 – Franco Zuculini, Argentine footballer
- 1991 – Skandar Keynes, English actor and political adviser
- 1993 – Pablo Reyes, Dominican baseball player
- 1993 – T. J. Warren, American basketball player
- 1994 – Kings Elliot, Swiss-English singer
- 1994 – Sarah Carli, Australian track and field athlete
- 1994 – Bonnie Anderson, Australian singer, songwriter and actress
- 1994 – Dayton Wetherby, US-born Panamanian footballer
- 1994 – Nediam Vargas, Venezuelan sprinter
- 1994 – Gregorio Paltrinieri, Italian swimmer
- 1995 – Lucas Wallmark, Swedish ice hockey player
- 1996 – Jarren Duran, American baseball player
- 1996 – Sigrid, Norwegian singer
- 1996 – Richairo Zivkovic, Dutch footballer
- 1997 – Steven Kwan, American baseball player
- 1997 – Kyōko Saitō, Japanese idol
- 1998 – Caroline Dolehide, American tennis player
- 1998 – Mac Jones, American football player
- 1998 – Davion Mitchell, American basketball player
- 1999 – Filip Chytil, Czech ice hockey player
- 2001 – Bukayo Saka, English footballer
- 2001 – Hamiso Tabuai-Fidow, Australian rugby league player
- 2007 – Matthew Schaefer, Canadian ice hockey player

== Deaths ==
=== Pre-1600 ===
- 590 – Authari, Lombard king (born 540)
- 714 – Shang, emperor of the Tang Dynasty
- 1165 – Nijō, emperor of Japan (born 1143)
- 1235 – Henry I, duke of Brabant (born 1165)
- 1311 – Amadeus Aba, Hungarian oligarch
- 1336 – Charles d'Évreux, count of Étampes (born 1305)
- 1526 – Alonso de Salazar, Spanish explorer
- 1548 – Catherine Parr, Queen Consort of England and sixth wife of Henry VIII (born c. 1512)
- 1562 – Katharina Zell, German Protestant reformer (born 1497)
- 1569 – Edmund Bonner, Bishop of London (born c. 1500)

=== 1601–1900 ===
- 1607 – Pomponne de Bellièvre, French politician, Chancellor of France (born 1529)
- 1629 – Domenico Allegri, Italian singer-songwriter (born 1585)
- 1734 – Nicolas Bernier, French composer (born 1664)
- 1786 – Jonas Hanway, English merchant and philanthropist (born 1712)
- 1803 – Pierre Choderlos de Laclos, French general and author (born 1741)
- 1803 – François Devienne, French flute player and composer (born 1759)
- 1836 – Ferdinand Raimund, Austrian actor and playwright (born 1790)
- 1838 – Charles Percier, French architect and interior decorator (born 1764)
- 1857 – Auguste Comte, French sociologist and philosopher (born 1798)
- 1876 – Manuel Blanco Encalada, Chilean admiral and politician, 1st President of Chile (born 1790)
- 1877 – Crazy Horse, American tribal leader (born 1849)
- 1894 – George Stoneman, Jr., United States Army cavalry officer (born 1822)
- 1898 – Sarah Emma Edmonds, Canadian-American nurse, soldier, and spy (born 1841)

=== 1901–present ===
- 1901 – Ignacij Klemenčič, Slovenian physicist and academic (born 1853)
- 1902 – Rudolf Virchow, German anthropologist, pathologist, and biologist (born 1821)
- 1906 – Ludwig Boltzmann, Austrian physicist and philosopher (born 1844)
- 1909 – Louis Bouveault, French chemist (born 1864)
- 1912 – Arthur MacArthur, Jr., American LTG (Army), Medal of Honor recipient (born 1845)
- 1917 – Marian Smoluchowski, Austrian-Polish physicist and mountaineer (born 1872)
- 1920 – Robert Harron, American actor (born 1893)
- 1922 – Georgette Agutte, French painter (born 1867)
- 1926 – Karl Harrer, German journalist and politician (born 1890)
- 1930 – Robert Means Thompson, American soldier, businessman, and philanthropist (born 1849)
- 1931 – John Thomson, Scottish footballer (born 1909)
- 1932 – Francisco Acebal, Spanish journalist, author, and playwright (born 1866)
- 1932 – Paul Bern, German-American director, producer, and screenwriter (born 1889)
- 1934 – Sidney Myer, Russian-Australian businessman, founded Myer Stores (born 1878)
- 1936 – Gustave Kahn, French poet and critic (born 1859)
- 1939 – Kathleen O'Melia, Canadian religious sister (born 1869)
- 1942 – François de Labouchère, French soldier and pilot (born 1917)
- 1945 – Clem Hill, Australian cricketer and footballer (born 1877)
- 1948 – Richard C. Tolman, American physicist and chemist (born 1881)
- 1953 – Richard Walther Darré, Argentine-German agronomist and politician, convicted war criminal (born 1895)
- 1954 – Eugen Schiffer, German lawyer and politician, Vice-Chancellor of Germany (born 1860)
- 1955 – Haydn Bunton Sr., Australian footballer and coach (born 1911)
- 1961 – Lewis Akeley, American academic (born 1861)
- 1965 – Thomas Johnston, Scottish journalist and politician, Secretary of State for Scotland (born 1882)
- 1966 – Dezső Lauber, Hungarian golfer, tennis player, and architect (born 1879)
- 1970 – Jochen Rindt, German-Austrian race car driver (born 1942)
- 1972 – Alan Kippax, Australian cricketer and businessman (born 1897)
- 1973 – Jack Fournier, American baseball player and coach (born 1889)
- 1975 – Alice Catherine Evans, American microbiologist (born 1881)
- 1977 – Marcel Thiry, Belgian poet and activist (born 1897)
- 1979 – Alberto di Jorio, Italian cardinal (born 1884)
- 1980 – Don Banks, Australian composer and educator (born 1923)
- 1982 – Douglas Bader, English captain and pilot (born 1910)
- 1983 – Meng Qingshu, Chinese politician (born 1911)
- 1984 – Adam Malik, Indonesian politician and diplomat, 3rd Vice President of Indonesia (born 1917)
- 1984 – Jane Roberts, American psychic and author (born 1929)
- 1985 – Johannes Hint, Estonian engineer (born 1914)
- 1986 – Neerja Bhanot, Indian flight purser, known for her heroic actions on Pan Am Flight 73, during which she was killed (born 1963)
- 1988 – Gert Fröbe, German actor and singer (born 1913)
- 1989 – Philip Baxter, Welsh-Australian chemical engineer (born 1905)
- 1990 – Hugh Foot, Baron Caradon, English academic and diplomat (born 1907)
- 1990 – Jerry Iger, American cartoonist and publisher, co-founded Eisner & Iger (born 1903)
- 1990 – Ivan Mihailov, Bulgarian politician (born 1896)
- 1991 – Sharad Joshi, Indian author and poet (born 1931)
- 1992 – Fritz Leiber, American author and poet (born 1910)
- 1993 – Claude Renoir, French cinematographer (born 1914)
- 1994 – Shimshon Amitsur, Israeli mathematician and scholar (born 1921)
- 1994 – John Newman, Australian politician (born 1946)
- 1995 – Benyamin Sueb, Indonesian comedian, actor, and singer (born 1939)
- 1995 – Salil Chowdhury, Indian music composer (born 1922)
- 1996 – Basil Salvadore D'Souza, Indian bishop (born 1926)
- 1997 – Leon Edel, American author and critic (born 1907)
- 1997 – Eddie Little Sky, American actor (born 1926)
- 1997 – Georg Solti, Hungarian conductor and director (born 1912)
- 1997 – Mother Teresa, Albanian-Indian nun, missionary, and saint, Nobel Prize laureate (born 1910)
- 1998 – Ferdinand Biondi, Canadian radio host (born 1909)
- 1998 – Willem Drees, Jr., Dutch economist and politician, Dutch Minister of Transport (born 1922)
- 1998 – Verner Panton, Danish interior designer (born 1926)
- 1998 – Leo Penn, American actor and director (born 1921)
- 1999 – Alan Clark, English historian and politician, Minister for Defence Procurement (born 1928)
- 1999 – Allen Funt, American director, producer, and screenwriter (born 1914)
- 1999 – Bryce Mackasey, Canadian businessman and politician, Postmaster General of Canada (born 1921)
- 2000 – Roy Fredericks, Guyanese cricketer and politician (born 1942)
- 2001 – Justin Wilson, American chef and author (born 1914)
- 2001 – Vladimir Žerjavić, Croatian economist and academic (born 1912)
- 2002 – David Todd Wilkinson, American cosmologist and astronomer (born 1935)
- 2003 – Gisele MacKenzie, Canadian-American singer and actress (born 1927)
- 2005 – Roberto Viaux, Chilean general (born 1917)
- 2007 – Jennifer Dunn, American engineer and politician (born 1941)
- 2007 – Paul Gillmor, American lawyer and politician (born 1939)
- 2007 – Thomas Hansen, Norwegian singer-songwriter and guitarist (born 1976)
- 2007 – D. James Kennedy, American pastor and author (born 1930)
- 2007 – Nikos Nikolaidis, Greek director and screenwriter (born 1939)
- 2009 – Gani Fawehinmi, Nigerian lawyer and activist (born 1938)
- 2010 – Hedley Beare, Australian author and academic (born 1932)
- 2010 – Guillaume Cornelis van Beverloo, Belgian-Dutch poet and painter (born 1922)
- 2012 – Ian Dick, Australian cricketer and field hockey player (born 1926)
- 2012 – Victoria Fyodorova, Russian-American actress and author (born 1946)
- 2012 – John Oaksey, English jockey and journalist (born 1929)
- 2013 – Edwin Bideau, American lawyer and politician (born 1950)
- 2013 – Geoffrey Goodman, English pilot, journalist, and author (born 1922)
- 2013 – Isamu Jordan, American journalist and academic (born 1975)
- 2014 – Bruce Morton, American journalist (born 1930)
- 2014 – Mara Neusel, German mathematician, author, and academic (born 1964)
- 2015 – Goh Eng Wah, Malaysian-Singaporean businessman, founded Eng Wah Global (born 1923)
- 2015 – Aadesh Shrivastava, Indian singer-songwriter (born 1964)
- 2015 – Chester Stranczek, American baseball player and businessman (born 1929)
- 2016 – Hugh O'Brian, American actor (born 1925)
- 2016 – Phyllis Schlafly, American lawyer, writer, and political activist (born 1924)
- 2017 – Nicolaas Bloembergen, Dutch-American physicist and Nobel laureate (born 1920)
- 2018 – Bhagwatikumar Sharma, Indian Gujarati writer and journalist (born 1934)
- 2018 – Beatriz Segall, Brazilian actress (born 1926)
- 2019 – Francisco Toledo, Mexican painter, sculptor, and graphic artist (born 1940)
- 2021 – Sarah Harding, English singer, member of Girls Aloud (born 1981)
- 2024 – Rebecca Cheptegei, Ugandan athlete (born 1991)
- 2024 – Herbie Flowers, English musician (born 1938)
- 2024 – Radha Charan Gupta, Indian historian of mathematics (born 1935)
- 2024 – Sérgio Mendes, Brazilian pianist and composer (born 1941)
- 2024 – Rich Homie Quan, American rapper (born 1990)
- 2024 – Laurent Tirard, French film director and screenwriter (born 1967)

== Holidays and observances ==
- Christian feast day:
  - Bertin
  - Charbel (martyr)
  - Genebald
  - Gregorio Aglipay (Episcopal Church)
  - Mother Teresa
  - Ursicinus of Ravenna
  - Zechariah and Elisabeth (Anglican and Eastern Orthodox Church)
  - September 5 (Eastern Orthodox liturgics)
- Earliest date on which Jeûne genevois can fall, while September 11 is the latest; celebrated on Thursday after the first Sunday of September. (Canton of Geneva)
- International Day of Charity
- Teacher's Day (India)
- The flag-flying day for Denmark's deployed personnel (Denmark)
- First day of school in Vietnam
