= Singapore Miniature Zoo =

Defunct zoo in Singapore

Coordinates: 1.2928°N 103.7675°E

- Interactive map of Singapore Miniature Zoo
- Date opened: 1957
- Date closed: early 1960s
- Location: Pasir Panjang Road, Singapore
- Land area: 2 hectares (4.9 acres)
- Owner: Tong Seng Mun

Singapore Miniature Zoo was a former private zoo located in Singapore from 1957 to 1960s. It was located at 189 West Coast Road (old informally Pasir Panjang Road 7 1/4 milestone).

== History ==
Opened by wildlife dealer Tong Seng Mun in 1957, it was home to a multitude of bird and animal species; such as lions, sun bears, penguins, panthers, orangutans, a leopard, a tapir, a camel, a baby rhinoceros, and a baby elephant. In addition to 50 tanks of tropical fish.

The size of the zoo was 2 hectares, which faced the sea. Owned a 90 kg sea lion imported from Holland in 1956 (costing $3,000) - it was featured at Singapore Aquarists Society's fish exhibition (held at the Happy World Stadium). The zoo was opened daily from 9am to 7pm, charged admission fees of 50c for adults and 20c for children. The zoo closed in the early 1960s.
