= Basketball at the 1973 SEAP Games =

1973 SEAP Games Basketball Tournament
- 1973

Tournament details
- Games: 1973 SEAP Games
- Host nation: Singapore
- Venue: Gay World Stadium
- Duration: 2–7 September

Men's tournament
- Teams: 4
Medals
Gold medalists	Malaysia
Silver medalists	Singapore
Bronze medalists	Thailand

Women's tournament
- Teams: 4
Medals
Gold medalists	Thailand
Silver medalists	Malaysia
Bronze medalists	Khmer Republic

Tournaments
← 1971	1975 →

Basketball was among the sports contested at the 1973 SEAP Games which were held at the Gay World Stadium in Geylang District, Singapore.

Malaysia successfully retained their SEAP Games men's basketball title after going undefeated in the tournament, blasting off Thailand in the final match, 87–74. The former five-time SEAP Games men's basketball champions went home with the bronze medal. Due to the loss of Thailand, the hosts Singapore were able to secure the silver medal after finishing second behind Malaysia in the tournament and defeating Khmer Republic on their final game, 82–69.

== Tournament format ==
For both the men's and the women's tournament, the competition was on a round robin format, wherein the top team at the end of the single round wins the gold medal, with the next two team will take home the silver and bronze medals, respectively.

== Men's tournament ==
=== Participating nations ===
- Khmer Republic
- Malaysia
- Singapore
- Thailand

=== Results ===
Pos	Team	Pld	W	L	PF	PA	PD	Pts	Final Result
1	Malaysia	3	3	0	263	214	+49	6	Gold medal
2	Singapore (H)	3	2	1	243	237	+6	5	Silver medal
3	Thailand	3	1	2	218	239	−21	4	Bronze medal
4	Khmer Republic	3	0	3	200	234	−34	3	

Rules for classification: (1) Tournament points, (2) Head-to-head tournament points, (3) Head-to-head goal average, (4) Overall goal average, (5) Drawing of lots
(H) Hosts

2 September 1973
18:00

Results

Khmer Republic	73–89	Malaysia

Gay World Stadium, Geylang

2 September 1973
21:00

Results

Thailand	81–94	Singapore
Scoring by half: 42–51, 39–43

Gay World Stadium, Geylang

4 September 1973
18:00

Results

Khmer Republic	58–63	Thailand

Gay World Stadium, Geylang

4 September 1973
21:00

Results

Singapore	67–87	Malaysia
Scoring by half: 30–41, 37–46

Gay World Stadium, Geylang

6 September 1973
21:00

Results

Khmer Republic	69–82	Singapore
Scoring by half: 37–37, 32–45

Gay World Stadium, Geylang

7 September 1973
21:00

Results

Malaysia	87–74	Thailand
Scoring by half: 40–40, 47–34

Gay World Stadium, Geylang

== Women's tournament ==
=== Participating nations ===
- Khmer Republic
- Malaysia
- Singapore
- Thailand

=== Results ===
Pos	Team	Pld	W	L	PF	PA	PD	Pts	Final Result
1	Thailand	3	3	0	181	139	+42	6	Gold medal
2	Malaysia	3	2	1	208	150	+58	5	Silver medal
3	Khmer Republic	3	1	2	167	182	−15	4	Bronze medal
4	Singapore (H)	3	0	3	132	217	−85	3	

Rules for classification: (1) Tournament points, (2) Head-to-head tournament points, (3) Head-to-head goal average, (4) Overall goal average, (5) Drawing of lots
(H) Hosts

2 September 1973
16:30

Results

Khmer Republic	56–70	Malaysia

Gay World Stadium, Geylang

2 September 1973
19:30

Results

Thailand	61–46	Singapore
Scoring by half: 27–24, 34–22

Gay World Stadium, Geylang

4 September 1973
16:30

Results

Khmer Republic	43–59	Thailand

Gay World Stadium, Geylang

4 September 1973
19:30

Results

Singapore	33–88	Malaysia
Scoring by half: 10–55, 23–33

Gay World Stadium, Geylang

6 September 1973
19:30

Results

Khmer Republic	68–53	Singapore
Scoring by half: 28–21, 40–32

Gay World Stadium, Geylang

7 September 1973
21:00

Results

Malaysia	50–61	Thailand
Scoring by half: 31–26, 30–24

Gay World Stadium, Geylang

== Medal table ==
* Host nation (Singapore)

Rank	Nation	Gold	Silver	Bronze	Total
1	Malaysia	1	1	0	2
2	Thailand	1	0	1	2
3	Singapore*	0	1	0	1
4	Khmer Republic	0	0	1	1
Totals (4 entries)		2	2	2	6

Preceded by 1971	Basketball at the Southeast Asian Games; 1973	Succeeded by 1975
