= Ling Yun (disambiguation) =

Ling Yun was a Chinese politician who served as the inaugural Minister of State Security.

Ling Yun may also refer to:

- Ling Yun (actor) (born 1941), Taiwanese actor
- Ling Yun (singer) (凌雲, also known as Rita Chao), Singaporean-Chinese singer

== See also ==
- Lingyun County, Guangxi, China
