= 593 Serangoon Road =

Shophouse

Coordinates: 1°18′58″N 103°51′31″E

593 Serangoon Road is a shophouse on the corner of Serangoon Road and Balestier Road. It previously housed the Singapore Institute of Science and currently houses the Sin Peng Lounge.

== History ==
The building was constructed in the 1930s. It has an "easily recognisable" curved frontage. In 1952, the Singapore Institute of Science, which was founded in 1940 and was among the first local institutions to hold science laboratory lessons, moved into the shophouse, occupying its entire second floor.

In the 1970s, the owners of the Sin Peng coffee shop, which was housed in the ground floor of the building, converted it into the Sin Peng Lounge. The lounge was also known as the Gold Cup Bar & Restaurant and the Gold Cup Mid-Nite Bar in this period, and was "one of the famous night-spots around the New World Amusement Park." In the 1980s, the owners of the club took over ownership of the building.

The building was gazetted for conservation in May 2018.
