= The Crazy Bumpkins =

1974 Hong Kong film by John Law

- Film poster
- 阿牛入城记
- Directed by: John Law; Yang Chang
- Written by: Lan Shu; On Szeto
- Produced by: Run Run Shaw
- Starring: Ye Fong; Wang Sa; Ti Ai
- Cinematography: Fa-Shen Wu
- Edited by: Wing-Chan Leung
- Music by: Joseph Koo
- Production company: Shaw Brothers
- Release date: 1 June 1974 (Hong Kong)
- Running time: 92 minutes
- Country: Hong Kong
- Languages: Mandarin; Cantonese

The Crazy Bumpkins (Chinese: 阿牛入城记) is a 1974 Hong Kong comedy film directed by John Law and produced by the Shaw Brothers that stars Ti Ai and Singaporean comedy duo Ye Fong and Wang Sa. The Crazy Bumpkins broke box office records in Singapore and Hong Kong on release.

== Plot summary ==
Ah Niu (Fong) decides to move from his rural hometown to Hong Kong with his uncle (Wang), but due to his naivety, he becomes a target of gangs and scammers.

== Cast ==
- Ye Fong as Ah Niu
- Wang Sa as Chou Ta Shu
- Ti Ai as Ah Hua

== Production ==
Ye Fong stated that the film took 2 months to make.

== Release ==
The Crazy Bumpkins was well received, having broken box office records in Singapore and Hong Kong. Due to the film's success, three more films were made, namely Return of the Crazy Bumpkins (1975), Big Times for the Crazy Bumpkins (1976), and Crazy Bumpkins in Singapore (1976).

== Reception ==
Renee Ng of Asian Movie Pulse stated that Ye Fong's character, Ah Niu, was reminiscent of Charlie Chaplin's Tramp and Rowan Atkinson's Mr. Bean.

For his performance in the film, Ye Fong won the Best Comedy Actor award at the 20th Asian Film Festival.

The Crazy Bumpkins helped propel Ye Fong and Wang Sa's career as comedians, making them celebrities in both Hong Kong and Singapore in the 1960s and 70s.
