= Goh Eng Wah =

- Born: 1923; Muar, Johor, British Malaya (now Malaysia)
- Died: 5 September 2015 (aged 92); Singapore
- Occupations: Film company founder WE Cinemas; Film Distributor
- Spouse: Mok Yuet Heng
- Children: Goh Keng Beng, James;Goh Keng Soon, Bob;Goh Min Lu, Cynthia;Goh Min Yen
- Awards: Asian Film Festival 1960s

Chinese name
- Traditional Chinese: 吳榮華
- Simplified Chinese: 吴荣华
Transcriptions
Standard Mandarin
- Hanyu Pinyin: wu2 rong2 hua2

Goh Eng Wah (1923 – 5 September 2015) was a film distributor, and one of the pioneers in Singapore's cinema industry. He founded Eng Wah Global Pte Ltd, a cinema operator specialising in Chinese movies imported from Hong Kong and Taiwan.

== Early life ==
Goh was born in 1923 in Muar, in Johor, Malaya the eldest son in his family . He graduated from secondary school in Malaya but was unable to continue his education because of the Japanese Occupation. He then moved to Singapore to escape the Imperial Japanese Army, but lived under Japanese occupation of Singapore from 1942 to 1945.

== Eng Wah Global Pte Ltd ==
His career started in 1945, when he together with a friend opened a cinema at Victory Theatre in Gay World Amusement Park at Geylang. The cinema became popular locally, even though its program consisted only of Japanese propaganda films. Subsequently, Goh and his friend brought it to neighbouring theatre called the Happy Theatre. Two years later, Goh became sole owner, and began acquiring other theatres.

In 1968, Eng Wah Theatres Organization Pte Ltd was established. He also financed several movies. He acquired Jubilee Theater (now part of the Raffles Hotel) and King's Theatre at Tiong Bahru in 1966. In the 1970s, he opened several cinemas in new HDB towns and the first cinema opened was at Toa Payoh and consequently opened others in Clementi, Ang Mo Kio and Kallang Bahru.

Under his leadership, the firm became the leading film distributor in 1980s and became the first cinema operator to be listed on 4 July 1994 in the SGX.

He was also engaged in other entertainment enterprises, opening a branch of the Crazy Horse Paris Cabaret in December 2005

His organization eventually owned 26 theatres halls,; he subsequently bought them back personally together with his daughter, Goh Min Yen,

== Properties ==
Goh have also owned several properties.

- Hotel Fort Canning
- The Legend Fort Canning
- The Legends Golf & Resort Sdn Bhd
- 321 Clementi
- Jubilee Square

== WE Cinemas Location ==
- 321 Clementi
