= New World Amusement Park =

Amusement park in Singapore

New World Amusement Park (新世界)
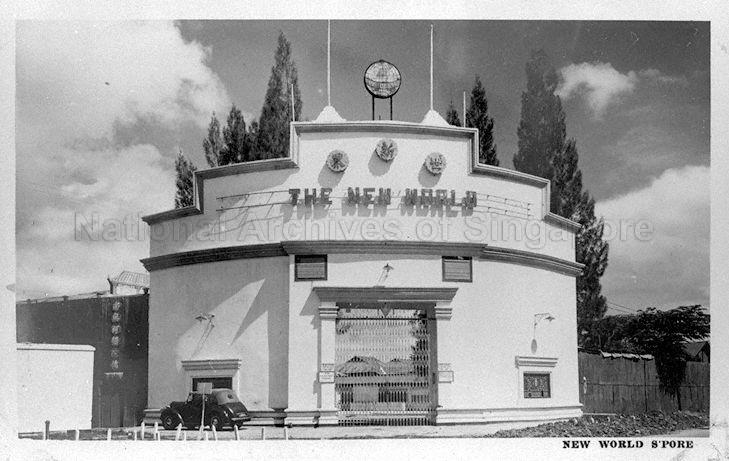
- New World Amusement Park from 1949 to 1950
- Interactive map of New World Amusement Park (新世界)
- Location: Kallang, Singapore
- Coordinates: 1°18′37.0″N 103°51′28.5″E
- Status: Defunct
- Opened: 1 August 1923; 102 years ago
- Closed: April 1987; 39 years ago
- Owner: Shaw Organisation
- Operating season: Year round (6pm till midnight)
- Area: 45,000 square feet

The New World Amusement Park (Chinese: 新世界) was the first of three amusement parks, along with Great World (estd. early 1930s) and Gay World (estd. 1936), that wooed Malaya and Singapore night crowds from the 1920s to the 1960s. New World was a prominent landmark along Jalan Besar, in modern-day Kallang planning area, as it occupied a large area of 45,000 square feet (4,200 m^{2}) in size. Before the arrival of televisions and radios, it attracted people from all walks of life from labourers to Europeans with its exciting attractions such as striptease, cabaret girls, opera shows and boxing matches during its heyday. Of all the artistes and athletes who have performed at the New World through the years, four have left a lasting impression – striptease queen Rose Chan, wrestler King Kong, strongman Mat Tarzan, and boxer Felix Boy. With the advent of shopping centres, discos and, particularly, television in the ensuing decades, the park business gradually became poor, and it was finally closed for good after being sold to a property developer for redevelopment in 1987.

== History ==
New World was set up on 1 August 1923 by two Straits Chinese brothers, Ong Boon Tat and Ong Peng Hock, under the company Ong Sam Leong Ltd. In the 1930s, the Shaw Organisation expanded their leisure business with a 50% joint venture with Ong Sam Leong Ltd. Shaw eventually bought out their partner and owned both the New World and the Great World at Kim Seng Road. Admission fee was only 10-cent per entry but visitors had to pay separately for its various entertainment programmes and hawker stalls within. Advertising itself as the "pioneer amusement park in Malaya", New World had a huge fairground for all walks of life; couples would go to the park for evening strolls, housewives frequented the food and diverse stalls, men would hop from the barber shops to the nightclubs, while families piled into the cinemas and onto fairground rides like ferris wheels and carousels where two of its rides, the Ghost Train and Dodg'em were crowd-pullers. In 1934, Dato Roland St. John Braddell, who was born in Singapore and served as Municipal Commissioner (1914–1929) wrote:

At New World, there are all sorts of entertaining sideshows. Best of all are the Malay opera and the Chinese theatrical performances which so fascinated Charlie Chaplin when he was here. We have another amusement park called the Great World, off River Valley Road, and it is well worth a visit, but it is not so boisterously alive as is the New World, since it caters to a much smugger class.

=== 'Taxi-girls' ===
At New World, a great number of men would come daily to "ronggeng" (Malay word for "social dance") or cha-cha with cheongsam-clad cabaret girls, known as 'taxi-girls' as they could be "hired" for dancing by anyone with a coupon. The dance floor could hold up to 500 twirling couples and each dance was registered on a card. Three dances cost a dollar and the girls were only paid 8 cents per dance. The earliest customers would secure their preferred dancers and also got seats nearest to the dancing girls. The girls were usually local or hailed from Hong Kong, Thailand and the Philippines. The girls were not call-girls; no naughty business was expected or allowed by their male partners. Watchful bouncers would ensure that such decorum was followed and they would not hesitate to throw out any trouble-makers or drunks found in the premises. Bruce Lockhart, a British army intelligence officer-cum-journalist, described his visit to the New World's dance hall:

When I came in, and a crowd of dancers, mostly young Chinese – the men in white European clothes with black patent-leather dancing shoes, the girls in their semi-European dresses slit at the side – filled the dancing floor. When the dance was over I noticed a number of girls who left their partner as soon as the music stopped and went to join other girls in a sort of pen. They were the professional dancers who can be hired for a few cents a dance.

During the Japanese Occupation, New World was renamed Shin Segal and turned into a gambling farm opened only to civilians but not Japanese soldiers. As commodities were scarce during the Occupation, the park was also turned into a black market selling necessities at inflated prices.

=== Striptease ===
After the war, the park roared back into life again when it was widely patronised by Allied soldiers and returning expatriates with their families. With the departure of those troops that resulted in much lower takings, the park decided to come up with a new attraction in 1949 – striptease. Madame Tai Fong, a former singer and dancer, started the Fong Fong Revue, introducing new dances and comedy routines, with exciting costumes for her girls that became the first known striptease public entertainment in Singapore. Her revues were soon pulling in huge crowds; the crowds got worse to the point that the colonial police had to move in to manage crowd control and issued a final warning that "this monkey business must cease". Striptease was thus stopped in its tracks but in time, it resurfaced back in New World again when Rose Chan took over the centre-stage in the 1950s.

Rose Chan Wai Cheng, who was China-born but locally raised, took up her striptease act when she was 27. She was known as the local Queen of Strip and took her acts around the three Worlds. She was famous for her python act; in which she cavorted with a large and sinuous python, coiling it provocatively round her bare body. Despite being labelled by conservatives as a 'rebel', she was kind hearted and gave money to charities and orphanages. She gave up her striptease career when she embarked on a new career – operating a hotel and restaurant in Jalan Raja Laut, Kuala Lumpur in 1976. In 1989, she died of cancer at the age of 62 in Penang but her memory lingers. A movie based on her life was made in 2008 by Royston Tan, a local movie director of 881 fame.

=== Wrestler 'King Kong' ===
A Hungarian-born professional wrestler, Emile Czaya, who weighed 236 kg in his prime and was often described as the "King Kong" or the "Hungarian Behemoth". An actor in his younger days, he took the name of "King Kong" after acting as the gorilla in the film of the same name. He won the heavyweight wrestling title of Europe three times and the middleweight title once. In 1938, he went to Singapore at the age of 19 with a troupe of European wrestlers to perform at the New World. Known for being "the meanest" amongst the wrestlers at New World, a former spectator, Abdul Wahab Mohamad said King Kong was the wrestler fans just loved to hate: "He would be challenging and threatening the jeering fans to get into the ring with him. He always won his fights. He was always too big and too strong for his opponents."

On 12 March 1970, Czaya was driving back to Singapore after a bout in Penang when his car crashed into a wall in Ipoh and he was badly injured. He was moved to the Outram Road General Hospital in Singapore but died on 15 May at the age of 61.

=== Strongman 'Mat Tarzan' ===
Ahmad Ali, better known as Mat Tarzan (or "Tarzan of Malaya") (1931–2015), was a well-known Malaysian strongman. Mat hailed from Penang and was the son of the late Haji Ali, who used to be a chef at Kedah House, now known as Istana Kedah in Jalan Sultan Ahmad Shah. During his prime, his famous feats included pulling with his teeth a lorry carrying 15 adults which would weigh about three tons, and bending iron bars across his throat. He could also lift 73 kilogram of weights from the floor with his teeth and dive through a burning wooden frame spiked with eight sharp blades and wrestled with full-grown pythons.

He had won various bodybuilding titles such as Mr Penang Health Culture League in 1959, 1960 and 1961, Mr Body Beautiful in 1963 and Mr Penang in 1966. Mat Tarzan was also a good cook in his own right, having picked up some useful culinary skills from his father, specialising in Malay dishes such as mee bandung, ox-tail soup and satay which he ran a chain of food stalls in Malaysia since the 1960s to the present day.

=== Boxer 'Felix Boy' ===
New World also hosted weekly boxing tournaments with fighters from Thailand, Philippines, Australia, as well as local pugilists. Malaysian boxer of Indian ethnicity Felix Boy, who was born S. Sinniah, became a household name in the early 1960s. He stood just 1.5 metres tall but packed a terrific wallop in both fists and often despatched his taller opponents by the second or third round in the flyweight and bantamweight divisions. Out of 84 fights, he lost two – both to Thai boxers.

Sinniah had a tragic childhood. At the age of five, his parents were captured and sent by the Japanese to work on the Death Railway in Thailand, and they died there. As a result, he and his elder brother, Shanmugam, were taken in by an orphanage. At nine, he used to watch a skilful Thai boxer in action at New World and that was the beginning of his interest in boxing. A French priest, Father Louis Ribaud of the St Joseph's Orphanage in Jalan Penang where Sinniah grew up, gave him the name of "Felix Boy" which was to bring him fame and glory in the ring in later years.

=== Sakura Teng, Wang Sa and Ye Fong ===
New World was also the place where Sakura Teng, a well-known 1970s Malaysian songbird, launched her music career at age 17. During her heyday in the 1960s and 1970s, the A go-go Queen as she was nicknamed, cut more than 50 records and was best known for her yodelling. The late popular stand-up comics, Wang Sa and Ye Fong, held their regular stage shows at New World too.

=== Closure ===
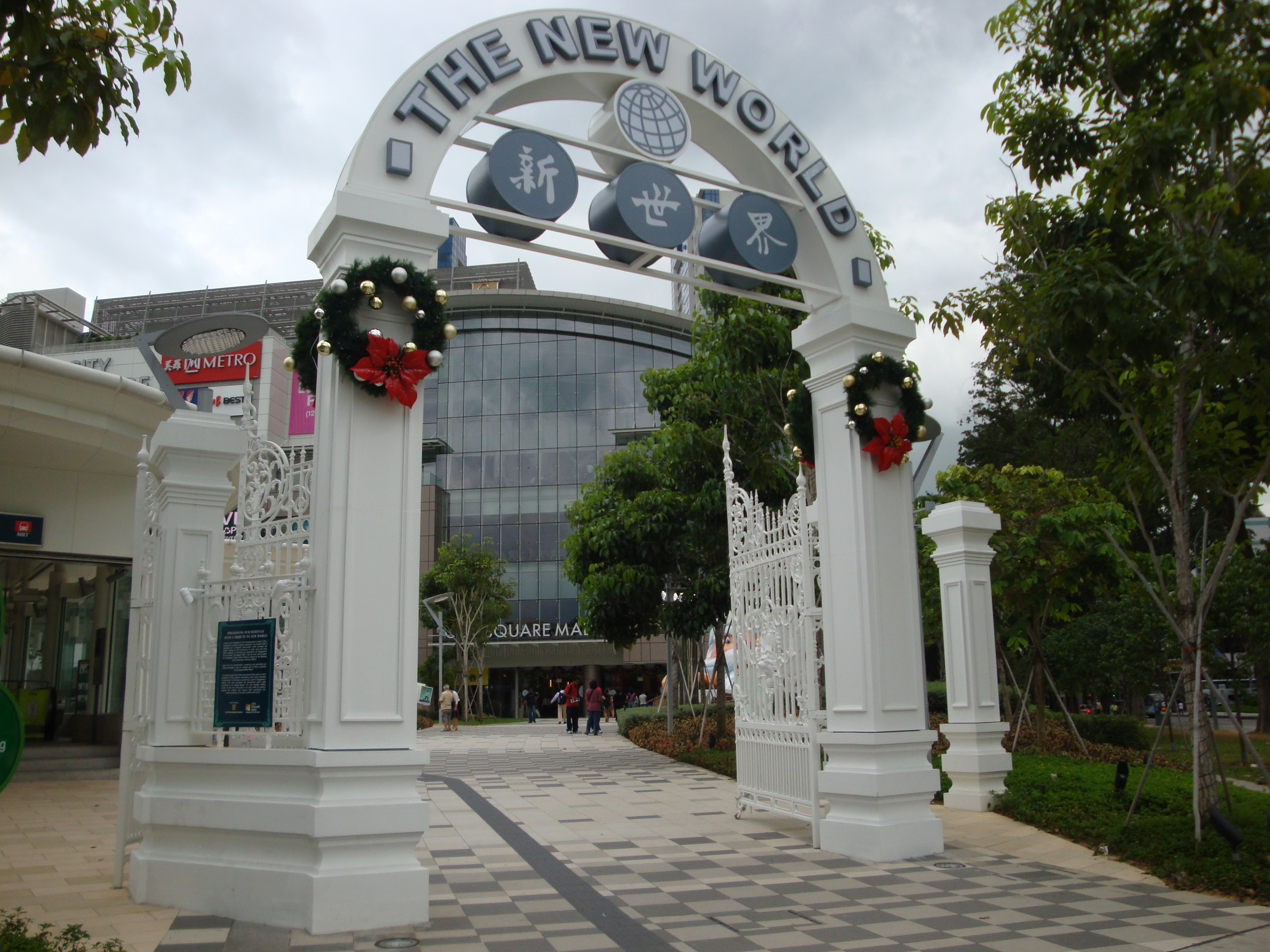
The now defunct gateway of New World, circa December 2010

New World faded from the night scene after the 1960s in the face of rival entertainment attractions such as shopping centres, discos and particularly television which took off locally in 1963. In April 1987, New World finally closed when Shaw Organisation sold the freehold site for S$35 million (US$23 million), to City Developments, a property firm owned by Kwek Leng Beng and his family for future commercial redevelopment.

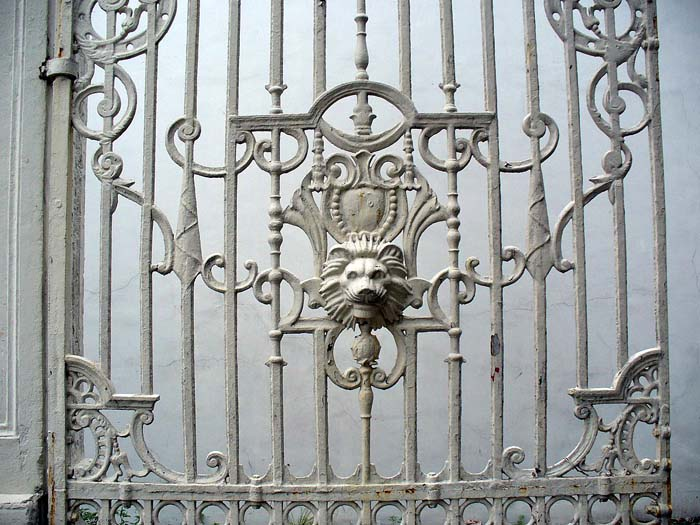
New World's iconic Lion Gate became the only relic left of the park now

Today, the site where the park sat was redeveloped by City Developments Limited for its City Square project, comprising a 910-unit condominium (City Square Residences), an eight-storey shopping mall (City Square Mall) and a public park (City Green). The park, which was completed in 2009, featured the original gate to the former New World when the refurbished gate was moved to the right side of the park's entrance in late 2010.

== See also ==
- Old National Library Building
- Singapore National Theatre
- List of abandoned amusement parks
