= Ye Fong =

Singaporean comedian

- Chinese: 野峰
Transcriptions
Standard Mandarin
- Hanyu Pinyin: Yě Fēng

Seow Tian Chye
- Simplified Chinese: 萧添财
- Traditional Chinese: 蕭添財
Transcriptions
Standard Mandarin
- Hanyu Pinyin: Xiāo Tiāncái

Seow Tian Chye, professionally known as Ye Fong (Sometimes spelt as Ya Fong or Ye Feng) (1932 – 1 September 1995), was a Singaporean comedian. He was part of a Singaporean comedy duo, with Wang Sa, who were akin to the Laurel and Hardy of the East.

== Early life and education ==
Ye was born in 1932 at Sungai Way, Petaling Jaya, Selangor, Malaysia. His elder uncle, who was without children, adopted Ye from his parents at the age of 4. With his adoptive father, Ye stayed at Malacca, Malaysia and subsequently moved to Singapore.

Ye studied at Ying Sin School (應新學校) which was managed by Ying Fo Fui Kun, a Hakka clan association in Singapore. He would later transferred to study at Qifa Primary School.

== Career ==
Ye's adoptive father was a goldsmith which influenced Ye to join the same trade. He learned the trade within fifteen months and became a goldsmith.

Ye often performed with Wang as a comedy duo at the New World Amusement Park and on television in the 1960s and 1970s.

Ye, in his first film role in The Crazy Bumpkins, won the Best Comedy Actor in the 20th Asia Pacific Film Festival in 1974.

== Death ==
Ye died of a heart attack on 1st September 1995. He was 63.

== Legacy ==
At the Star Awards 2003, Ye together with Wang, were awarded posthumously the 40th Anniversary Evergreen Achievement Award.

In 2024, Singapore Chinese Cultural Centre (SCCC) and Mediacorp jointly produced a documentary series, Documentary: Legends Of Singapore Comedy, and an exhibition, Legends Of Singapore Comedy: An Exhibition On Wang Sha And Ye Feng, at SCCC on the lives of Ye and Wang.
