= Well Lee =

Chinese singer (born 1988)

Well Lee (Chinese: 李炜; born December 6, 1988, in Fuzhou, China) is a Chinese singer, who first gained notice by winning the 2010 Happy Boy singing competition.

== Biography ==
Well Lee later became a graduate from Fujian Art Professional Institute. He participated in 2007 Happy Boy singing competition, but failed to enter the national finals. In 2010, he again participated in the Hunan TV Super Boy and finally won the championship.

== Happy Boy ==
Lee's attendance experience at the 2010 Hunan TV Super Boy is listed below.

Date	Finale	Song
	Mass election	《剪爱》《凌晨三点钟》
2010.07.16	Nationwide 10/12	《天黑黑》《I'm back》 (win the "week champion")
2010. 07.23	Nationwide 8/10	《U》《剪爱》
2010. 07.30	Nationwide 7/8	《Try try我的未来》(win the "week champion")
2010. 08.06	8090踢馆夜	《你和我》《突然好想你》《小男人大男孩》
2010. 08.13	Nationwide 6/7	《彩虹》《玛丽莲梦露》
2010. 08.20	Nationwide 5/6	《草戒指》《情歌两三首》《不可能错过你》
2010. 08.27	Nationwide 4/5	《必杀技》《盖世英雄》《没那么简单》
2010. 09.03	Nationwide 3/4	《路一直都在》《一场游戏一场梦》《太美丽》
2010. 09.10	Final night	《Try try我的未来》《爱如潮水》《你那么爱她》《Cockney Girl》《爱你一万年》《海芋恋》《到不了》(win the final champion)

== Discography ==
Time	Song
2010	My Stage (Chinese:《我的舞台》), Love at first sight (Chinese: 《一见钟情》)
2011	Incomplete (Chinese:《残缺》), We are competent (Chinese: 《我们有一套》), Fashionable sports (Chinese: 《潮流运动》), The first lesson (Chinese: 《第一课》)

His first personal album [造梦者-dreamer] is coming out is the middle of October 2012
