= Hotel Fort Canning =

METT Singapore
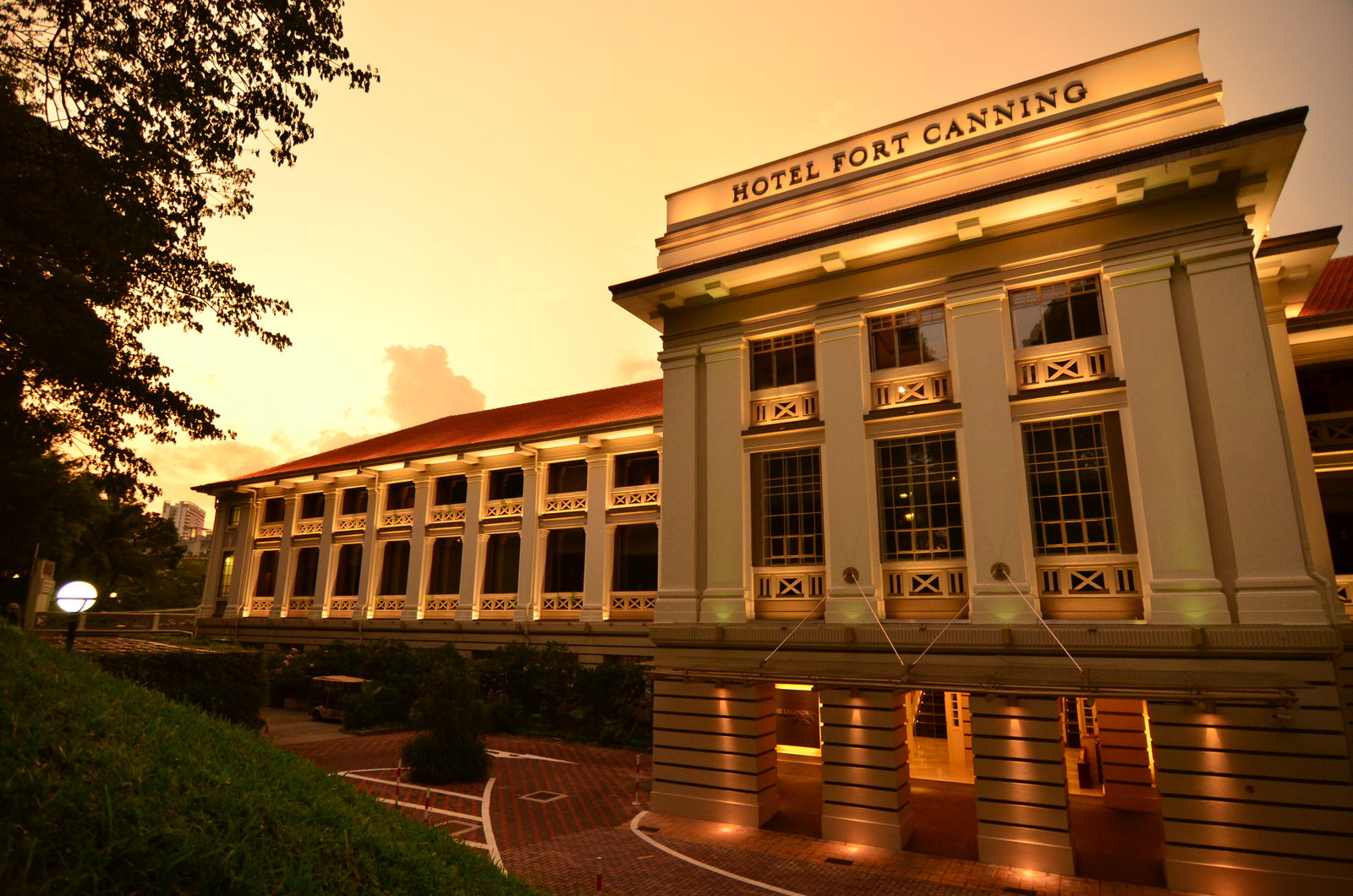

- Location within Singapore
- Former names: Administration Building of the British Far East Command Headquarters; Singapore Command and Staff College; Fort Canning Country Club

General information
- Status: Completed
- Type: Boutique Hotel
- Architectural style: Low-rise
- Location: 11 Canning Walk, Fort Canning Downtown Core, Singapore
- Coordinates: 1.2959°N 103.8433°E
- Completed: 1926
- Opening: 1926; 2010
- Owner: Eng Wah Global

Renovating team
- Renovating firm: DP Architects

Website
- www.metthotelsandresorts.com/singapore/

Hotel Fort Canning, currently branded as METT Singapore, is a boutique hotel opened in 2010 in Fort Canning Park, Singapore. Located near the Orchard Road and Clarke Quay Nightlife districts, the building was the British Far East Command Headquarters during World War II. The building was restored and reconstructed as a hotel by architectural firm DP Architects which sought to maintain its British colonial architectural style and the multi-columned façade of the old headquarters.

== History and conservation ==
=== British Far East Command HQ ===
The military building was built in 1926 as the Administration Building of the British Far East Command HQ. The General-Officer-Commanding, Lieutenant General Percival, had an office in this building. The building was occupied by the Japanese Military during the Occupation (1942–1945). The British Military took it back after the war and used it as part of the British Military Administration.

=== Singapore Command and Staff College ===
The building was then taken over by the Singapore Armed Forces when Singapore became independent. In 1970, the building was used by the Singapore Command and Staff College (SCSC). In 1976, the SCSC moved out of the building, and it remained unoccupied until 1995, when it housed the Fort Canning Country Club. The Legends Fort Canning Park took over the premises in November 2002, and in July 2011, it re-opened as Hotel Fort Canning.

== Facilities ==
The hotel has 86 stylised rooms and suites.

Hotel Fort Canning's upper-floor windows have wide views of Fort Canning Park and the Downtown Singapore skyline.

The hotel has two outdoor swimming pools filled with water treated by a non-chlorination-based system, a gym, and Chinois Spa @ The Legends. It also has two food and beverage outlets and six meeting venues with conference facilities.

== Awards & Accolades ==
=== 2019 ===
- Tripadvisor Travellers' Choice Award (Top 25 Luxury Hotels – Singapore)

=== 2018 ===
- Booking.com – Guest Review Award (8.8 out of 10)
- Tripadvisor Travellers' Choice Award
- Historic Hotel of the Year (Singapore), Travel & Hospitality Awards
- Best Garden Solemnisation Venue (5 star), Her World Brides Venue Awards
- Luxury City Hotel of the Year – Singapore, Luxury Travel Guide Awards
- Top 100 Boutique Hotels – Hotels.com Loved By Guests Awards

=== 2017 ===
- TripAdvisor Certificate of Excellence
- Seven Stars Luxury Hospitality and Lifestyle Award
- World Luxury Restaurant Awards, Country Winner (The Salon)
- Best Solemnisation & Outdoor Reception Venue, Her World Brides Venue Awards
- Best Outdoor Wedding Theme, Her World Brides Venue Awards
- World Luxury Hotel Awards, Country Winner (Luxury Eco/Green Hotel)
- World Luxury Hotel Awards, Country Winner (Luxury Architecture Design Hotel)
- World Luxury Hotel Awards, Country Winner (Luxury Romantic Hotel)

=== 2016 ===
- Excellent Service Awards
- Haute Grandeur Global Hotel Awards
- Seven Stars Luxury Hospitality and Lifestyle Award
- TripAdvisor Certificate of Excellence
- TripAdvisor Traveller's Choice Award
- World Luxury Hotel Awards
- World Luxury Restaurant Award (Nominee)

=== 2015 ===
- World Luxury Hotel Award Winner
- Her World Brides Venue Awards (Best Wedding Solemnisation Venue for Hotels – 5 Star & Above)
- Tripadvisor Certificate of Excellence
- BCA Green Mark Gold Plus Award Winner

=== 2014 ===
- World Luxury Hotel Awards (Luxury Historical Hotel)
- Tripadvisor Certificate of Excellence
- AsiaOne People's Choice Awards Top 3 Finalist (Best Boutique Hotel)
- Her World Brides Venue Awards (Best Wedding Solemnisation / Reception Venue for Hotels – 5 Star & Above)
- AsiaRooms.com Hotel Awards – Top 10 Most Cultural Hotel (SEA)
- EXSA Service Excellence Awards – 5 Silver Awardees
- Booking.com Guest Review Award Winner

=== 2013 ===
- Tripadvisor Certificate of Excellence
- Tripadvisor Travellers' Choice Award

=== 2012 ===
- Top 20 Trendiest Hotels in Singapore
- TripAdvisor's Certificate of Excellence
- TripAdvisor Traveller's Choice Award

=== 2011 ===
- Winner of the "URA Architectural Heritage Award".
- Destinasian Luxe List of 2011
- Top Signature Boutique Hotel / Resort, Hospitality Asia Platinum Awards
- TripAdvisor Traveller's Choice Award
