= Wang Sa =

Singaporean comedian

Heng Kim Ching, (simplified Chinese: 王锦清; traditional Chinese: 王錦清; pinyin: Wáng Jǐnqīng) (30 March 1925 – 18 January 1998) professionally known as Wang Sa (Chinese: 王沙; pinyin: Wáng Shā), was a Singaporean comedian. He was part of a pair of Singapore comedy duo, Wang Sa and Ye Fong, who were akin to the Laurel and Hardy of the East.

With Ye Fong, Wang often performed as a duet at the New World Amusement Park and on television in the 1960s and 1970s. They were also well-known in Malaysia, Taiwan, and Hong Kong.

Wang died of chronic lung disease on 18 January 1998, aged 73.

== Legacy ==
At the Star Awards 2003, Wang together with Ye, were awarded posthumously the 40th Anniversary Evergreen Achievement Award.

In 2024, Singapore Chinese Cultural Centre (SCCC) and Mediacorp jointly produced a documentary series, Documentary: Legends Of Singapore Comedy, and an exhibition, Legends Of Singapore Comedy: An Exhibition On Wang Sha And Ye Feng, at SCCC on the lives of Ye and Wang.

== Personal life ==
He was Chinese Singaporean of Teochew descent from his ancestral roots in Chenghai, Shantou.
