= Gay World Amusement Park =

Amusement park in Singapore

Gay World Amusement Park (繁華世界)
- Previously known as Happy World (快樂世界)
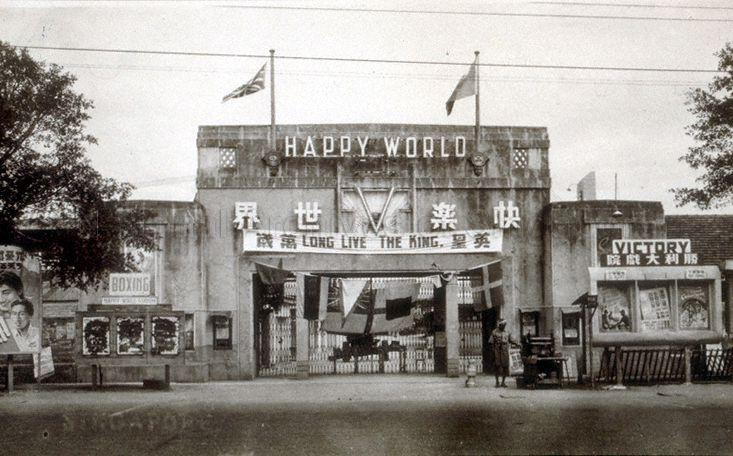
- Gay World Amusement Park in the 1940s
- Interactive map of Gay World Amusement Park (繁華世界)
- Location: Kallang, Singapore
- Coordinates: 1°18′38.1″N 103°52′25.5″E
- Status: Defunct
- Opened: 6 May 1937; 89 years ago
- Closed: 2000; 26 years ago
- Area: 3.2 ha (7.9 acres)

Gay World (simplified Chinese: 繁华世界; traditional Chinese: 繁華世界), formerly known as Happy World (快乐世界; 快樂世界) was one of the famous trio of "World" amusement parks in Kallang, Singapore. It was formerly located between Geylang Road and Grove Road (now Mountbatten Road). Together with the other two "Worlds", Great World Amusement Park (1930s–1978) at Kim Seng Road and New World Amusement Park (1923–1987) at Jalan Besar, Gay World Park was hustling and bustling with nightlife during the 1930s to 1960s. These amusement parks were especially popular among Singaporeans, as it was the locals' only form of entertainment, before television or shopping malls were introduced. Gay World Park was an all-in-one complex, where visitors were offered a wide range of entertainment, from films to shopping and games. However, as its popularity began to dip in the 1970s, Gay World Park was eventually demolished in 2000 to make way for residential estates.

== History ==
=== Establishment ===
Gay World was set up in 1936 by George Lee Geok Eng of George Lee Motors at a cost of $350,000. This amusement park was originally known as Happy World when it first started operations in April 1937. It was later renamed Gay World Park in 1966 when Eng Wah Organization officially took over ownership of the park. Even though the other two amusement parks were already well-established before the introduction of Happy World and had mechanical rides such as ferris wheels as attractors, Happy World still managed to attract crowds as it offered a unique fusion of Eastern and Western entertainment concepts. From traditional Javanese dances (called ronggeng), to films, cultural shows, cabaret performances, and sports matches, Happy World offered affordable entertainment for many Singaporeans. Happy World, however, in comparison to the other 2 amusement worlds, was not designed to attract the family demographic, but more of a greater impression of adult entertainment. Once inside, the first programs visitors would face would be two nightclubs flanking the entrance. The most striking characteristics of Happy World was the Happy World Stadium, greatly recognised for its massive octagonal shape of about 60 m (200 ft) in diameter, and its Happy World Cabaret where men flocked to mingle with taxi-girls for a price.

=== Opening ceremony ===
On 6 May 1937, Happy World celebrated its opening with a grand affair, with over 1000 guests drinking over 100 gallons of champagne. Tea was served to the guests in the cabaret as well as to 100 tables set up inside the main entrance gates at the park. Only several stalls, the cabaret and the Happy Cinema had completed construction at this time. Guests were given a performance at the cabaret by Ms Maudrene Yap prior to the opening of the dance floor to guests.

=== Impacts on the surroundings ===
During the peak of Happy World's popularity, its nightlife had a profound impact on its surrounding streets for decades to come with the creation of the red-light district along the even numbered Lorongs and the lesser known establishment of the Happy Charity School in 1946 on Lorong 14. The school was founded by dance hostesses of Happy World Cabaret and funded entirely by their profits.

=== Japanese occupation ===
During the period leading to World War II, Happy World began to host fundraising events to support China in its war relief efforts. The Singapore Overseas Chinese Relief Fund Committee, at the time headed by the businessman and philanthropist Tan Kah Kee, organised frequent performances at Happy World to gather funds for China. In May 1939, Tan addressed a crowd of over 10,000 at Happy World in an event to raise funds for war relief efforts. During this period, another form of "entertainment" was introduced in Happy World. Then, Japanese air raids were rampant, and the cabarets, with their bright lights and attractive decorations were easily targeted. As such, when the air raids sirens were sounded, the Cabarets would switch off all the lights in the park to avoid the Japanese bombings. In these periods of "blackout", many men would then take the opportunity to engage in some form of hanky panky. These events were later known to be the famous "blackout dances". When the Japanese took over Singapore in 1942, businesses at the parks were temporarily closed. However, the Japanese encouraged the Shaw Brothers to re-open the parks, but this time, under the Japanese military control. Happy World was assured to be safe from raids, but it was to be partially converted to a gambling den. The Japanese made use of these gambling dens to earn profits, from taxes and licence fees. This meant that Happy World could continue its usual operations, and nightlife in Geylang resumed.

=== Post-war ===
These gambling dens were later closed down when the Japanese surrendered in 1945. Happy World resumed operations and Singaporeans continued to swarm to Happy World in the evenings. It was renamed to Gay World in 1966.

=== Fall in popularity ===
However, in the 1970s, popularity of Gay World began to decline due to various factors.

==== Urban redevelopment ====
In the late 1960s, the Singaporean government became increasingly concerned with issues related to gangsterism and associated them with the nightlife scene in the country. Finally, in 1972, after a stabbing incident at the Boiler Room club in Mandarin Hotel, the government issued a total ban on live music in clubs. The ban lasted for five years. As urban redevelopment plans in Singapore went underway, "the character of the Geylang of the numbered lorongs was changing, too. The rich folks who lived in those grand bungalows … were slowly shifting out. Sleaze and vice, which for the longest time was discretely tucked away, started to become more prominent." (Mr Joseph Pereira, Geylang resident) Consequently, visitors to Gay World also progressively declined.

==== Frequent fires ====
Another factor that caused Gay World's drop in popularity was the frequent fires that ravaged the park. In 1962, fire broke out twice within 2 months. This caused the damage of a theatre, part of the Cabaret and 26 stalls. Fire troubles continued to plague the park in the following years – twice in 1972, once in 1976, which destroyed more than $500,000 worth of goods, with further fires in 1977, 1983, and 1988.

==== New forms of entertainment ====
Most importantly, with the establishment of new attractive and fascinating shopping malls, as well as the rise of television, Gay World Park could no longer outcompete these newer and more interesting forms of entertainment. In a bid to revive its past glory, Gay World Park began to roll out free admissions in 1987. However, visitation to the park remained low as it could not compete with the newer cineplexes popping up all over the country at the time with only one of its cinemas left in operation.

==== Decline of the three "Worlds" ====
In fact, this decline in popularity due to newer forms of entertainment was not exclusive to Gay World Park. The other two Worlds (New World and Great World) also saw a significant decrease in patrons, which ultimately led to the closure of Great World in 1978 and New World in 1987. New World was sold to City Development for future commercial redevelopments and today, City Square Mall and City Square Residences occupies the site of New World. Similarly, Great World was sold to a Malaysian Chinese investor and was later redeveloped to become Great World City Shopping Centre.

=== Closure and demolition ===
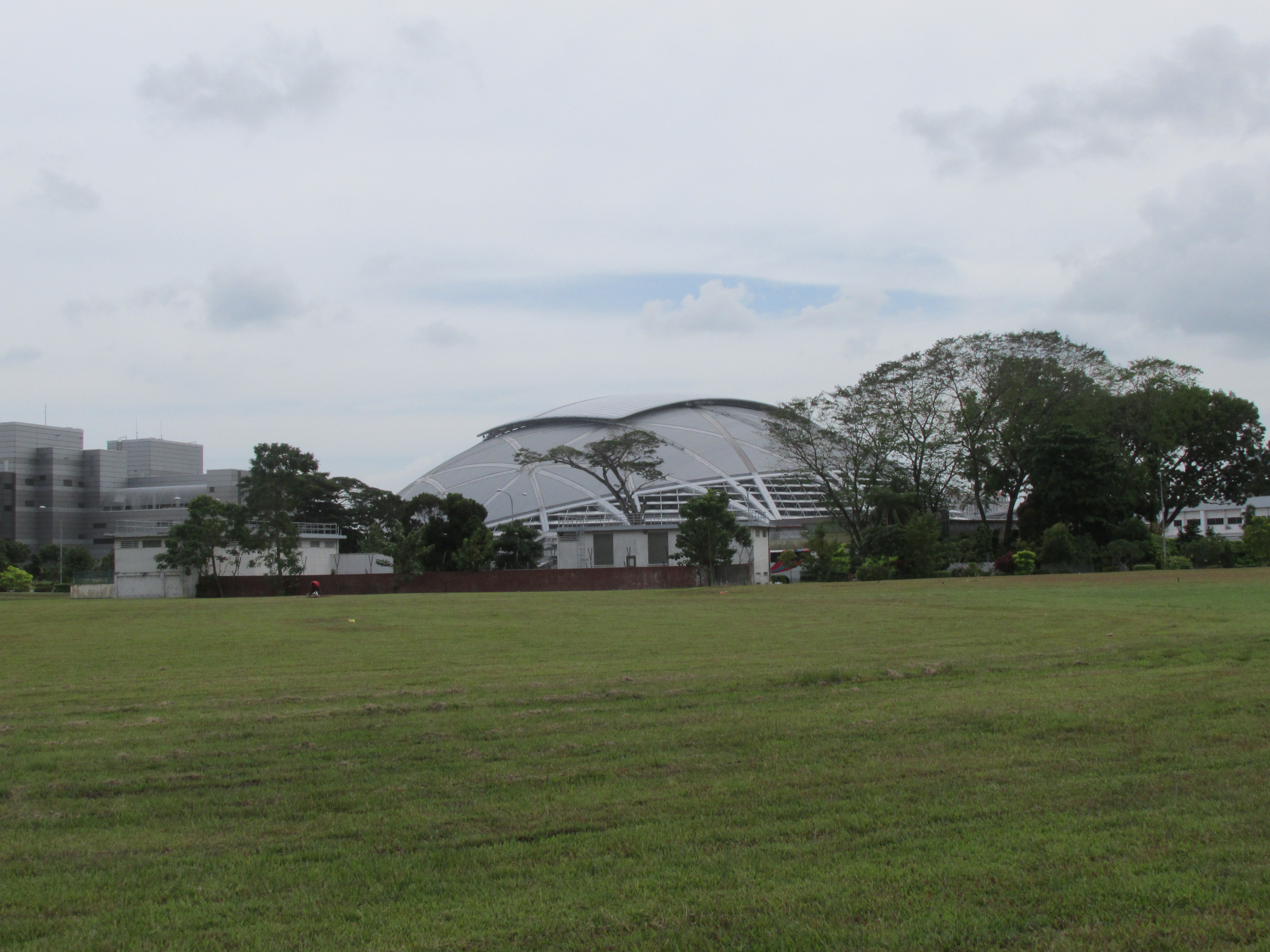
View of the National Stadium from the empty plot of land where Gay World Amusement Park was once situated

As visitors became scarce, the state of Gay World Park deteriorated and the park was no longer properly maintained. It was even reported that rats and stray dogs were often seen running around the complex. In 2000, it was announced that this 3.2-hectare amusement park was to be torn down as the site has been zoned for future residential estates. Eng Wah Organization discontinued its lease to the park and the 150 tenants were notified by the Land Office to vacate the building. However, many tenants were reluctant to leave, and when the lease for Gay World Park was temporarily extended, some shops continued operations. Unfortunately, as power and water supply were cut, these remaining tenants had to resort to portable generators and car batteries for electricity. In 2001, the last basketball match at Gay World Park was played. The following day, the entire park was torn down along with the Geylang Indoor Stadium (originally the Gay World Park indoor stadium).

== Entertainment ==
Gay World Park was best known for its nightlife scene, from movies to cabarets, from sport games to shopping. Gay World catered to the young and the old, attracting many couples and families to frequent the park.

=== Cinema ===
Gay World used to have four cinemas, including the Victory Theatre, Silver City, Happy Theatre, and New Happy Theatre. Victory Theatre and Happy Theatre was the first two theatres ever opened by Eng Wah Theatres Organisation. Victory Theatre was especially popular among couples because of its unique open-air theatre concept. This large theatre could accommodate up to 300 seating audiences and several hundred more standing audiences.

=== Dance hall/cabaret ===
Professional bands dished out live music performances in the dancehall, providing the perfect ambience for dancing, from jazz to ronggeng to joget. In addition, cabaret performances in the dance hall were also extremely well-received as cabarets were one of the most well-known forms of entertainment back in the 19th century.

Cabaret girls, also known as "taxi dancers", were dance partners that one could engage. Men could purchase dance coupons that entitled them to three dances with these Chinese, Siamese, and Filipino taxi dancers for a dollar.

==== Impact and influences ====
Happy World Cabaret was the starting point of the career of renowned entertainer Rose Chan who first joined Happy World as a cabaret dancer in 1942 in an attempt to spite her husband.

In 1946, the Happy Charity School at Geylang was established by Madam He Yan Na, one of the "big sisters" of the Happy World Cabaret, in an attempt to provide free Chinese education to the many children left without opportunity for education as a result of the war. The school was funded entirely by donations made by the cabaret girls of Happy World and at one point provided education to over 600 students. It operated from a rented shophouse on No. 24 Lorong 14 in 1946 and then moved to No. 67 and 69 of the same street in the following year. Due to the increasing preference of families to send their children to English schools in the 60's and 70's, Happy Charity School experienced dwindling student numbers and soon permanently closed in 1979.

The red light district of present-day Geylang, along the even-numbered Lorong streets of 2 to 30, is said to have been a result of the nightlife scene of Happy World Cabaret.

==== Architecture ====
The Happy World Cabaret was a uniquely oval-shaped building that stood as an icon for Happy World next to the indoor stadium. It was positioned on the eastern side of the park premises at the side entrance of the park. It possessed a circular, sliding-roofed dance hall large enough to accommodate up to 300 couples on its well sprung dance floor. The dance floor was surrounded by a dining area that ascended in three tiers and ended in a wide gallery that swept around all walls. Bordering the dance floor were also skirting marbled columns as well as seats for the 100 cabaret girls that worked there. The cabaret was well ventilated with many fans and windows provided for natural breezes. Lighting within the cabaret was also received well by reviewers who noted the use of neon strips, hidden lighting and a liberal use of spotlights. The cabaret also possessed a roof garden that where couples and dancers could go. It provided an unobstructed view of the nearby Civil Aerodrome on one side. More gardens and paths ran around outside the cabaret to differentiate it from the rest of park grounds. Several gazebos were also planted right outside the building.

=== Indoor stadium ===
Gay World also had a large octagonal that was once reported to be the largest indoor stadium in Southeast Asia. It could seat up to 7,000 spectators and hence, was ideal for various type of sports and hosted many sporting events, from boxing to table tennis, badminton and tennis. In fact, Gay World Stadium hosted Malaya's first badminton Thomas Cup in 1952 and also the 1973 Southeast Asian Peninsular Games after being acquired by the government specifically for the event. Among the locals, Gay World Stadium was also especially famous for their wrestling and boxing matches starring renowned boxers such as Ventura Marquez, King Kong, and Tiger Ahmad. When the stadium was not being used for boxing or sporting matches, the stadium was used as a music performance venue and dance hall. Gay World Stadium was later renamed Geylang Indoor Stadium in 1966 and thereafter, was managed by the Singapore Sports Council.

==== Architecture ====
The Gay World Stadium (then known as Happy World Stadium) was designed by Chung & Wong Architects and was built in 1937. Constructed out of reinforced concrete and covered by a large steel roof, it was the largest structure that stood in Gay World at about 60 metres in diameter. It also acted as the park's icon due to its highly recognisable octagonal shape. The seats of the stadium run up to 15 tiers, to a height of approximately 25 feet.

== Future development ==
While the land that Gay World Park sits was originally designated for residential use, however, no concrete plans has been established to date. Other than a period where this site was used briefly as a temporary location for two concrete plants which were especially needed at the time of the Nicoll Highway collapse, and the Deep Tunnel Sewage System office, this piece of land remains barren, with no evidence of Gay World Park's past in existence.

== Gay World Hotel ==
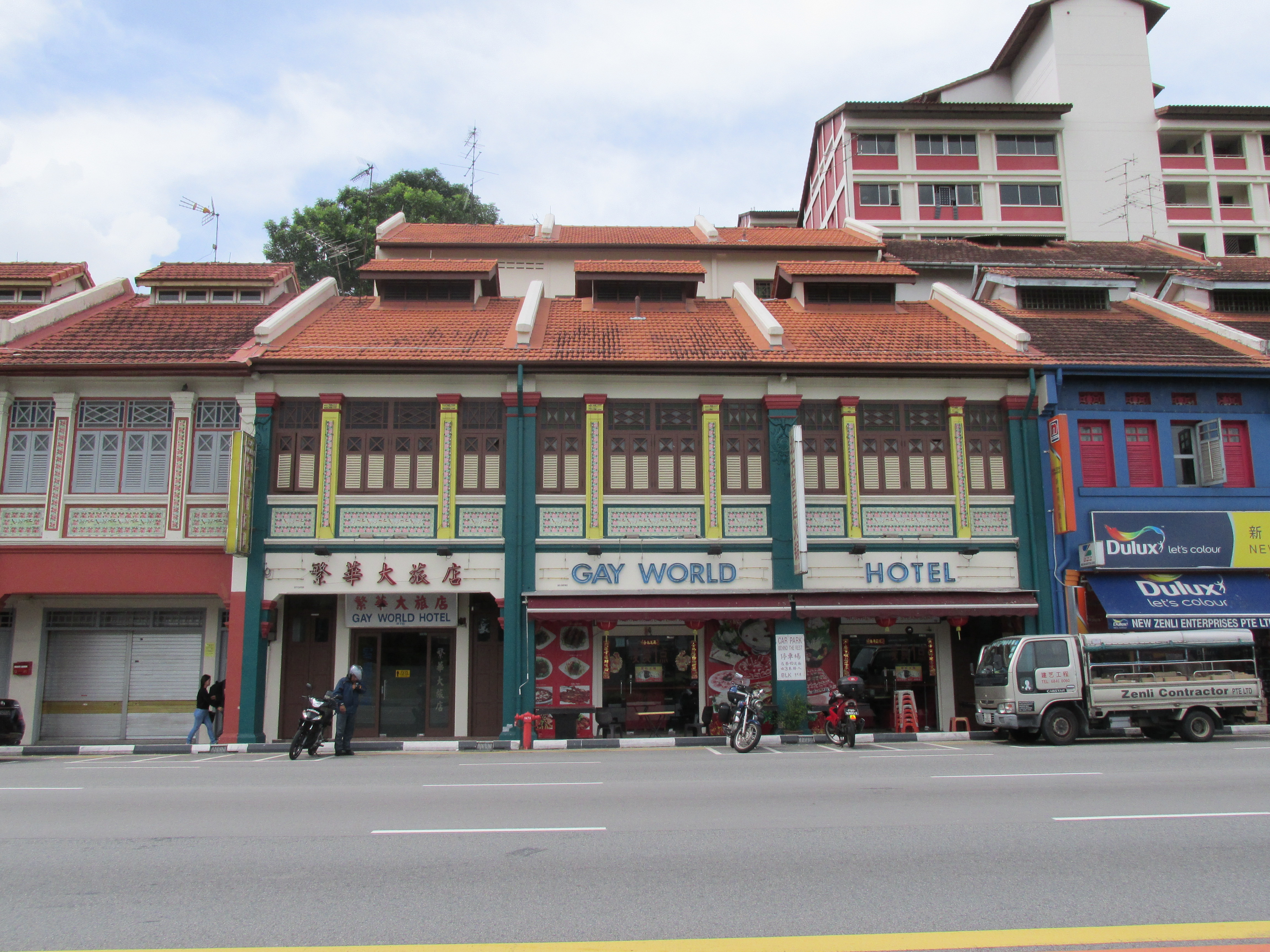
Gay World Hotel

Until recently, the only sign of Gay World Park's existence was a converted-shophouse hotel, Gay World Hotel (since renovated and renamed Habyt Kallang). Bearing the same name as Gay World Park, Gay World Hotel was located across Geylang Road, where Gay World Park was once situated. This hotel was the only remaining evidence that Gay World Park used to be a popular landmark in its good old days, to the extent that a hotel was named after it.

== See also ==
- List of abandoned amusement parks
- New World Amusement Park
- Great World Amusement Park
