= Rose Chan =

Malaysian erotic dancer

- 陈惠珍
- Born: Chan Wai Chang; April 18, 1925; Suzhou, China
- Died: 26 May 1987 (aged 62); Butterworth, Penang, Malaysia
- Burial place: Beow Hong Lim Columbarium, Air Itam, Penang, Malaysia
- Other names: Queen of Striptease; Queen of Strippers; Charity Queen; Charity XQueen
- Occupations: Cabaret dancer stripper
- Years active: 1942–1976
- Agents: Lee Ying; Lee Kai Hong
- Spouses: unknown Singaporean harbour contractor (m. 1941–1942) Mohamed Nazier Kahar (m. 1957; div. 1960) Chong Yew Meng (m. 1962; div. 1965) Jimmy Chew (m. 1962; div. 1972) Low Kim Seng (m. 1977–1987)
- Children: 4

Chinese name
- Traditional Chinese: 陳惠珍
- Simplified Chinese: 陈惠珍
Transcriptions
Standard Mandarin
- Hanyu Pinyin: Chén huì zhēn
Wu
- Suzhounese: Zen^{2} We^{6} Tsen^{1}
Yue: Cantonese
- Jyutping: Can4 Wai6 Zan1
Southern Min
- Hokkien POJ: Tân Hūi-tin

Rose Chan (born Chan Wai Chang (Chinese: 陈惠珍; pinyin: Chén Huìzhēn); 18 April 1925 – 26 May 1987) was a Chinese-born cabaret dancer and stripper nicknamed the "Queen of Striptease" in her adopted homeland of Malaysia. Her exploitation of her sexuality garnered her considerable controversy. Her philanthropy gained her the moniker the "Charity Queen".

== Early life ==
Born in Suzhou, China, in 1925 to acrobat parents, Chan was brought to Kuala Lumpur in 1931, at the age of six, by her adoptive mother. (Chan knew who her birth mother was, but would never reveal her name when asked). She had no formal education, save for eight months of schooling at the age of 12. Even at that young age, she demonstrated an entrepreneurial spirit by taking photographs for classmates, charging them 15 cents, and earning 10 cents a shot. Late for school on a few occasions because she had to collect the photographs from the shop, her mother stopped her schooling after the school complained.

Still only 12 years old, she started working in a button-making shop, earning six gantangs of rice and one loaf of cornbread a month plus 12 cents per thousand buttons. In a day, she made a few thousand buttons from coconut shells with a machine. She next worked at making mosquito nets, where she was better paid, with eight gantangs of rice, six katis of sugar, two bottles of oil, and one loaf of cornbread a month.

In 1941, when Chan was 16, her mother arranged for her to marry an elderly Chinese Singaporean harbour contractor to become his fourth wife, as her boyfriend could not afford the kind of dowry that was expected. They would later have a son. For her dowry, the contractor offered SGD$3,000, a pair of diamond earrings, a locket, a chain, and a bracelet, which were taken by her mother. Her marriage, however, would break up after a few months, when her husband got fed up with her mother's constant request for SGD$1,000–$2,000 each time.

He sent her back to Kuala Lumpur and gave her SGD$600 a month, on the condition that her mother would get a servant to do the housework. Her mother, however, pocketed the money. One day, when her husband dropped by the house on his way to the Penang races, he saw Chan doing housework. Angered, he not only stopped sending money, but stopped seeing her entirely.

== Career ==
With her allowances cut, and her finances in dire straits, Chan sold her last gold bracelet for over RM$300, and took a train to Singapore the following year in 1942 to meet her husband. Unfortunately, he refused to accept her. She stayed behind to become a cabaret dancer at the Happy World, her husband's favourite haunt, in order to spite him. In the cabaret, she proved herself an accomplished dancer, and was runner-up in two national championships:

- All-Women's Ballroom Dancing Championships in Singapore in 1949;
- Miss Singapore beauty contest in 1950.

As a result of her success, she was in great demand, and started dancing at as many as five cabarets at a time.

In 1951, Chan opened her own show, The Rose Chan Revue, touring the whole of then-Malaya. The turning point of her career came unexpectedly the following year, and transformed her from a cabaret girl to the "Queen of Striptease" at the age of 27. It happened to be a wardrobe malfunction. While performing at the Majestic Theatre in Ipoh, her brassiere snapped. The enthusiastic applause from the audience caught her by surprise, and set her thinking: "Here I dance all night and sweat so much, and nobody claps. My bra breaks and they clap".

Spotting a market for snapping-underwear, Chan shot to fame overnight with an act like no other in Malaya. Hence the "Striptease Queen" was born. She was just as quick to earn the "Charity Queen" moniker. Even before her unexpected fame, she had started to do charitable work by dancing in aid of the Nanyang University Fund.

=== A Rose Chan show ===
Once the music starts, the troupe emerges from behind the curtains, and parade on stage, clad only in panties, and a star pastie covering each nipple. Dancing slowly to the tune of Chinese music, typically cha-cha and mambo rock, they strip naked the moment a voice booms "Hoi!" (Cantonese: "open") over the microphone. The opening striptease is followed by various sideshows — standup comedians, clowns, archery performance, fire performance and jugglers — which served to prolong the mounting anticipation for the star attraction.

When Chan comes on stage, she moves subtly, gently swaying in a slow dance, all by herself. As she removes one piece of clothing after another, the tempo gradually picks up. When she reaches the point of removing her brassiere, she holds back. That is when her stagehands bring in the pythons, and she dances with the snakes wrapped all around her. Next, she removes her brassiere, and dances bare-breasted. After a while, the snakes are removed. She then approaches the people sitting nearest to the stage, who are normally the elderly big towkays (Hokkien: business owner). She takes an old man's spectacles, rubs it against her private parts, and then gives it back to him. Some of her acts are very crude. With her legs spread wide open, she peruses her most intimate parts to:

- stuff a banana inside;
- open the cap of a Coca-Cola bottle;
- pull out a string of razor blades that was inserted in one by one;
- shoot a dart at a balloon high up.

She then tells some jokes. Sometimes, she will ask a Caucasian (because she knows they are more sporting than the shy, local guys) to go up on stage, and gets him to strip her or any of her performers. She slowly rolls down her panties, bit by bit, until the audience can have a peek at her pubic hair. The crowd goes hysterical, and eventually, she removes her panties, and dances and sways to the beat. The music then slows down, and she walks around, and then off she goes backstage.

Chan brought her striptease act to Kuala Lumpur, Penang, and Alor Star, always donating part of her proceeds to charity, benefiting children and old folks' homes, institutions for the blind, and tuberculosis patients, earning another moniker of "Charity XQueen".

=== Circus stunts ===
In 1954, Chan upped the ante for revues by introducing circus stunts that included:

- her python-wrestling act;
- bending iron rods, stuck to the base of her throat;
- carrying a man on her shoulders;
- placing planks across her body, and having motorcycles ride over her.

Her stunts made her famous, and she took her act around the world, including Germany, France, Britain, Australia, and Indonesia.

In July 1957, Chan embraced Islam when she married Indonesian Mohamed Nazier Kahar, and in accordance with Muslim rites in Singapore, changed her name to Rosminah binti Abdullah. Her marriage lasted three years, and bore no offspring. She subsequently married a company manager Chong Yew Meng in 1962, and had a son, but the marriage again failed in 1965. Her fourth marriage with a musician Jimmy Chew in 1965 later yielded a son.

While her husbands may have come and gone, one man had remained a constant influence. Lee Kai Hong, a Chinese-newspaper journalist-property developer, was her long-time friend, and later, her manager. It was with Lee that Chan hatched up an idea to circumvent the colonial British decency laws. In those days, there was a law that allowed for models to pose nude for artists, so long as they kept absolutely still. As revolving stages were not invented yet, Chan and Lee improvised a little table on coasters, with ropes attached to each corner. The moment she was completed naked, Chan would jump on the table, and four guys would pull each rope, spinning her around so that everyone had a good view. Even though the letter of the law had been adhered to, the spirit of the law was obviously contravened.

By then Chan was well known throughout Malaysia, including the conservative east coast. She would perform for two weeks in one town, and then move on to another. Chan also performed private shows where people who had the money could hire her to perform at their own place. The cultural climate that allowed her to thrive was one still steeped in colonial influences. British authorities and Australian forces remained a constant presence in the 1950s and early 1960s.

Shows at BB Park in Kuala Lumpur were held on a stage normally used for Chinese wayang (Malay: opera stage show). The audience sat on rows of wooden old cinema-style chairs. Tickets were priced at about RM10 to RM15, with those nearer the stage paying a premium. Publicity for these shows was made through advertisements in the Chinese newspapers. On Saturdays when the public worked half days, Chan and her troupe would perform three shows: 2.00 pm, 7.30 pm, and 9.30 pm. For the afternoon shows, she would often perform extreme acts, starting 45 minutes earlier than the stipulated time to avoid being nabbed for contravening the indecency laws. After 2.00 pm, however, her show would mellow to comply with the regulations.

Frankie Laine's hit "Rose, Rose, I Love You" was inspired by her.

=== Banning from performance ===
In 1967, Chan was banned from performing in Kuala Lumpur following a police raid at BB Park. When she took her act to Perth in September 1970, she was arrested for performing indecently in public. She was, however, acquitted. The following month, Chan was charged again in Perth, she was convicted of accepting money for sex at a massage parlour, and fined A$60.

By the 1970s, public sentiments had changed with the increasing pace of Islamization in Malaysia. Chan and Chew later divorced in 1972. Chan's shows received many complaints and in 1973, the government revoked her performing licence. Notwithstanding, Chan introduced her daughters Jennifer and Irene Chan as two of her several protégés to the press in 1974 and kept performing until she officially announced her retirement in 1976, with her last striptease show taking place in Kuala Lumpur.

== Later life and death ==
After her retirement, Chan married her fifth and final husband Low Kim Seng in 1977 and kept herself busy with numerous ventures, all of which were failures. In Seremban, she managed a music band, opened a restaurant, and gave curative massage. She also raised funds for numerous charities. An American publishing firm offered her RM3 million for her autobiography, but the deal fell through when she insisted on US$3 million for it.

Around 1980, Chan was diagnosed with breast cancer, and she chose to spend her final days in Penang, after being told by her doctors that she had only 18 months to live. That was when she hooked up again with her one-time manager, Lee Kai Hong, and together, they opened Galant, a one-stop entertainment shop at Transfer Road. By late 1986, her health had deteriorated further, and it was then that she began to believe that her breast cancer was caused by her taxing act of balancing heavy objects on her chest during her performances. She also attributed the blood clots around her body to the python-coiling acts.

In the six years since she fell sick, her medical treatment had taken its toll on her finances, and she was apparently in dire straits. The Golden Maid lounge at Burmah Road held a 5-night charity show with her daughter Irene as one of the dancers to raise funds for her treatment. The effort, however, proved too late.

Chan died at her home in Butterworth, Penang on 26 May 1987, leaving behind her husband, a son and three daughters — her eldest son, from her first marriage, and an adopted daughter, having earlier disowned her. Her husband Low Kim Seng, son Chong Weng Thye, two daughters Jennifer and Irene Chan and her manager Lee Kai Hong were at her deathbed.

She was interred at the Beow Hong Lim Columbarium in Air Itam, Penang.

== Timeline ==
- 1925: Born Chan Wai Chang in Suzhou.
- c. 1931 (aged six): Brought from Suzhou to Kuala Lumpur by her adoptive mother.
- 1937 (aged 12): Enrolled for school for eight months, after which she worked for a button-making shop; shop makes buttons out of coconut shells.
- c. 1938 (aged ~13): Worked for a mosquito-net cottage industry.
- 1941 (aged 16): Married a Chinese Singaporean harbour contractor to become his fourth wife.
- 1942 (aged 17): Became a cabaret dancer at the Happy World cabaret, after her husband rejected her.
- 1949 (aged 24): Runner-up at All-Women's Ballroom Dancing Championship in Singapore.
- 1950 (aged 25): Runner-up in the Miss Singapore beauty contest.
- 1951 (aged 26): Opened her own show, touring the whole of Malaya.
- 1952 (aged 27): Turning point of her career when she transformed herself to the "Queen of Striptease".
- 1954 (aged 29): Introduced her famous python wrestling act, and other circus stunts.
- July 1957 (aged 32): Embraced Islam and married second husband, Indonesian Mohamed Nazier Kahar, changing her name to Rosminah binti Abdullah.
- 1960 (aged 35): Divorced with Mohamed Nazier Kahar.
- 1962 (aged 37): Married her third husband, Chong Yew Meng.
- 1965 (aged 40): Divorced her third husband, Chong Yew Meng and later married her fourth husband Jimmy Chew.
- 1967 (aged 42): Banned from performing in KL, following a police raid on her revue at BB Park.
- September 1970 (aged 45): Arrested in Perth for performing indecently in public, but was acquitted; charged again in Perth for prostitution at a massage parlor and fined A$60.
- 1970s: Received many public complaints for her shows.
- 1972: (aged 47): Divorced her fourth husband.
- 1973 (aged 48): Lodged a corruption report in July to the National Bureau of Investigation (NBI) against a cultural officer in the Ministry of Culture, Youth and Sports; Malaysian authorities took away her performing licence in the same year.
- 1976 (aged 51): Retired for good, her last striptease took place in Kuala Lumpur.
- 1977–79 (aged 51–54): Married her fifth and final husband Low Kim Seng and managed a music band opened a restaurant, and gave curative massage in Seremban, all ending in failure; received a RM3 million offer from an American publishing firm for her autobiography, but the deal fell through when she insisted on US$3 million.
- c. 1980 (aged 55): Diagnosed with breast cancer, and given about 18 months to live.
- 1980s: Opened Galant, a one-stop entertainment shop at Transfer Road, with one-time manager, Lee Kai Hong.
- 1987 (aged 62):
  - April: Bed-ridden by cancer at the Kuala Lumpur General Hospital.
  - 20–24 May: Golden Maid lounge at Burmah Road organised a five-night charity show to raise funds for Chan's medical expenses. Patrons were charged RM10 per head during each of the two daily shows, in which daughter Irene performed.
  - 26 May: Died at her home in Butterworth.
