= Music of Singapore =

Singapore has a diverse music culture that ranges from rock and pop to folk and classical. Its various communities have their own distinct musical traditions: the Chinese form the largest ethnic group in Singapore, with Malays, Indians as well as a lesser number of other peoples of different ethnicities including Eurasians. The different people with their traditional forms of music, the various modern musical styles, and the fusion of different forms account for the musical diversity in the country.

It has an urban musical scene, and is a center for pop, rock, punk and other genres in the region. The country has produced in the 1960s bands like The Crescendos, Naomi & The Boys and The Quests, right up to the new millennium with pop singers such as Stefanie Sun and JJ Lin. Folk music of Singapore includes the ethnic music traditions of the Chinese, Malay and Tamil communities. Singapore also has a lively Western classical music scene.

== Popular music ==
Singapore has been a regional centre of music industry for a long time. Recordings of Chinese and Malay popular music were done at the Philips Recordings Studio, EMI studio in Singapore in the colonial period, but until the 1960s, recordings were sent to be pressed in India and the records then sent back for sale. Singapore was the centre of Malay-language popular culture throughout the Malayophone Southeast Asia where stars such as P. Ramlee, but after Singapore's independence in 1965, the centre of the Malay-language music industry began to shift to Kuala Lumpur exacerbated by the ban of Singaporean entertainment in Indonesia as well as the negligence of the Singaporean cinema industry itself.

=== Malay popular music ===
In the 1960s, local bands in Singapore were inspired by Western groups such as Blue Diamonds, Cliff Richard & the Shadows, and The Beatles. Popular groups of the period included The Crescendos who performed in English with hit songs like "Mr Twister", The Quests who had hits like "Shanty", "Don't Play That Song", "Jesamine" and "Mr Rainbow", as well as other pop-rock bands including the popular Naomi & The Boys, The Thunderbirds, The Trailers, The Crescendos, The Western Union Band, October Cherries and The Silver Strings. A Malay genre influenced by British rock and pop called pop yeh-yeh emerged in the 1960s. The bands performed in the Malay language, although some may also performed in English or were instrumental.

Malay pop bands of the 1960s included Naomi & the Boys who produced a household hit song "Happy Happy Birthday Baby", D'4 Ever, Antarctics, Mike Ibrahim & the Nite Walkers, Swallows, Ismail Haron & the Guys, and Les Kafila's. By the late of this deacade, demand in neighbouring Malaysia and Indonesia also supported Malay-language pop magazines published in Singapore, including Bintang dan Lagu, which covered current bands and record releases.

In the late 1970s and early 1980s saw the rise of rock bands such as Sweet Charity fronted by the vocalist Ramli Sarip. The band had such an influence in the Singapore and Malaysia music scene that it later led to the rock kapak boom in the mid 1980s; though the Malaysian market's large size than their minuscule Singaporean market became more inviting to those rockers who moved across the Causeway for better opportunities, some even switching their Singaporean citizenships for Malaysian ones.

=== Chinese popular music ===
Singapore also emerged as a centre of local Chinese recording industry in the 1960s, producing Chinese pop music in Mandarin with local singers. From the 60s to the 80s, local stars such as Chang Siao Ying (張小英), Sakura Teng (樱花), Rita Chao (凌雲), and Lena Lim (林竹君) were popular in Singapore and Malaysia. A few, such as Lena Lim, also has some success outside the region.

The Chinese pop music industry thrived by the 1980s overpassing that of the shared Malay-language music industry and market with Malaysia, with several recording companies producing Chinese records by local as well as Taiwanese singers. Starting in the mid 1980s, a genre of Mandarin ballads called xinyao began to emerge with singers and/or songwriters such as Liang Wern Fook, Lee Shih Shiong, and Billy Koh. Local music labels such as Ocean Butterflies International and Hype Records were established. From the 1990s onwards, many Singaporean singers such as Kit Chan, Stefanie Sun, JJ Lin, Tanya Chua, Corrinne May, Fann Wong, and Mavis Hee had achieved wider success outside of Singapore.

=== English popular music ===
There are also a number artists from Singapore who work primarily in the English language. Since the 2010s, Singapore has seen a rise in home-grown acts like Charlie Lim, The Sam Willows, Gentle Bones, The Steve McQueens, Pleasantry, MYRNE, HubbaBubbas, Sam Rui, Leon Markcus, Scarlet Avenue, Krysta Joy, jupiterkid and Nathan Hartono. Independent labels such as PARKA and Homeground Studios have also emerged during this period to support these acts, providing production resources and distribution channels for Singapore's growing English-language music scene.

== Ethnic music traditions ==
=== Chinese ===
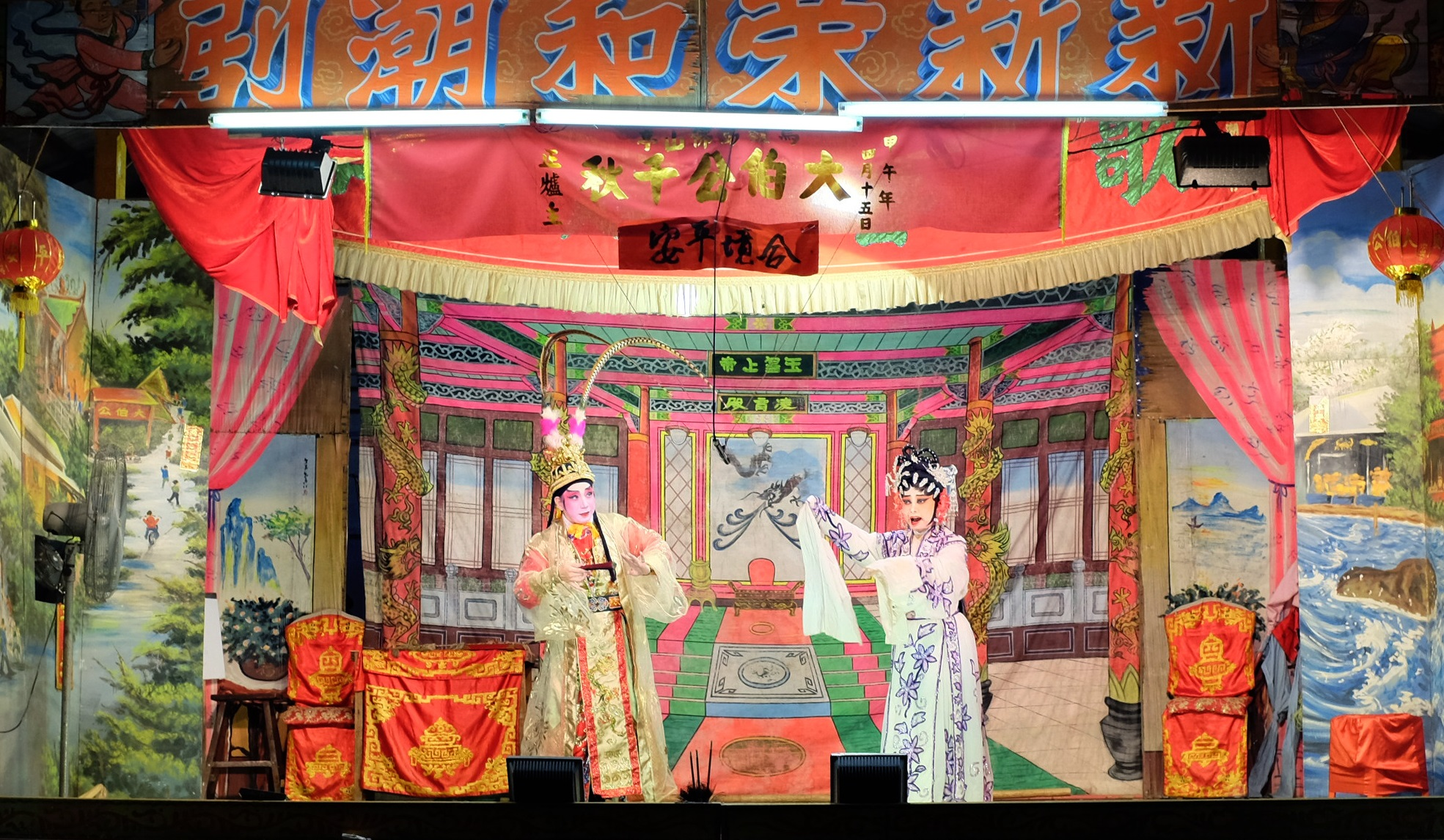
Performance of a Teochew opera in Pulau Ubin, Singapore

There are speakers of various Chinese languages aside from Mandarin (often erroneously called ‘dialects’) amongst the Chinese population, such as Hokkien, Hakka, Cantonese, and Teochew, and different dialect speakers may have their own clan associations which support their respective forms of opera. Opera troupes were first formed by amateur music clubs; the earliest amateur music club in Singapore is the Er Woo Amateur Music & Dramatic Association (馀娱儒乐社) set up in 1912 by Teochew businessmen, initially to promote music of the Hakkas (Hanju opera and Handiao music), later also Teochew opera. A number of recordings of Hanju opera performed by Er Woo were made in the 1920s and 1930s. Many professional and amateur opera troupes that performed in various dialects were later established. These opera troupes typically perform during festivals and national events, and may also hold regular small-scale performances, or large-scale ones annually or biannually. The professional troupes may also perform in opera theatres. During Chinese festivities there was also a minstrel tradition called zouchang (walk-sing), which involves walking performance by members of the operatic troupes. In the past, makeshift stages often appeared during festivities along the streets where operas may be performed. However, operas have declined as popular entertainment in the latter half of the 20th century; opera theatres closed, and street opera have mostly been replaced by getai where modern songs and comedy routines are performed, although street opera is still performed by professional and amateur opera troupes.

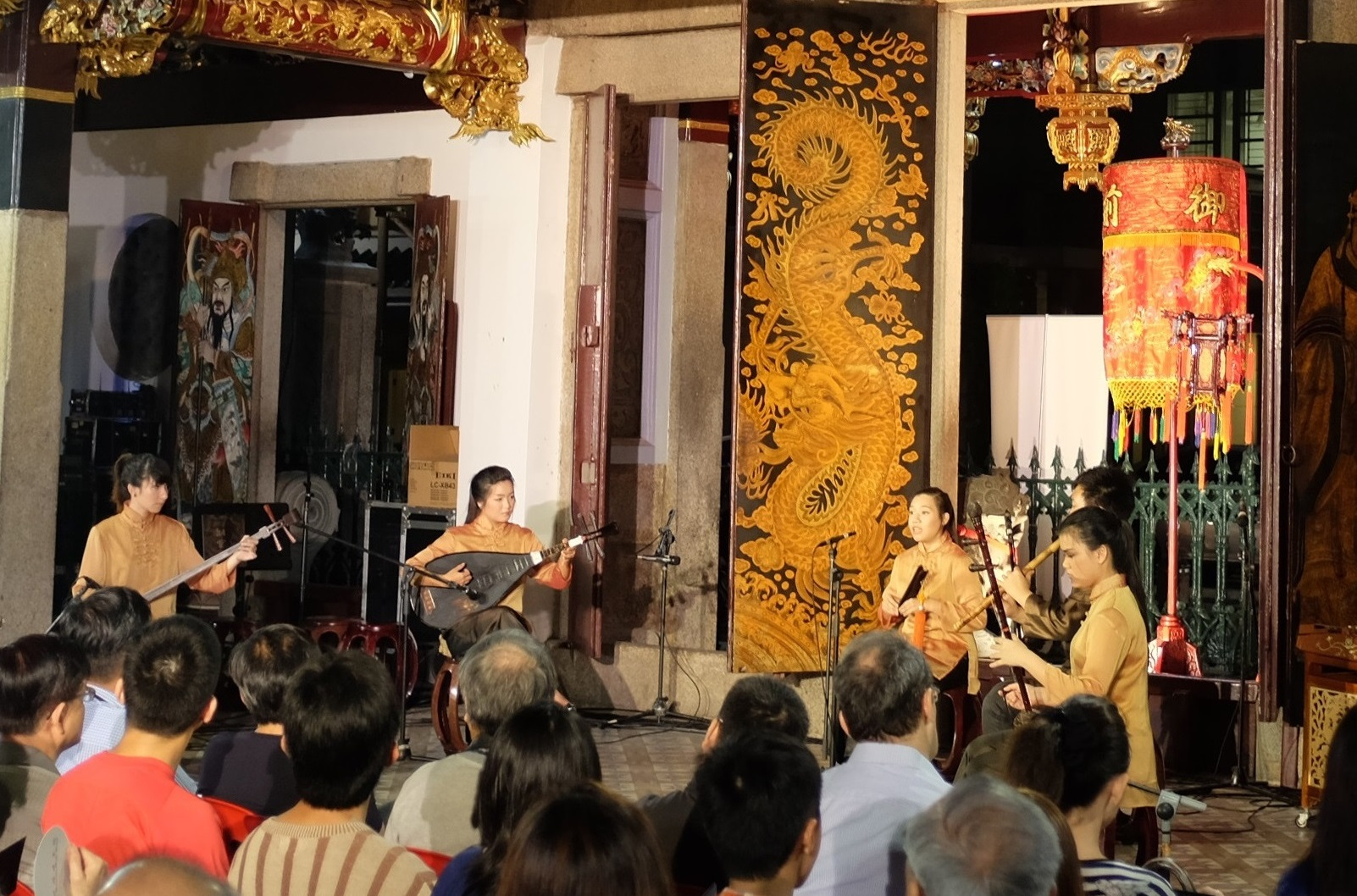
A Nanyin performance at Thian Hock Keng temple

Many music organisations and ensembles devoted to Chinese music or Huayue were established in the 1950s, and there are now many full-sized Chinese orchestras in Singapore. The first Chinese orchestra was formed in 1959 by the Thau Yong Amateur Musical Association (陶融儒乐社), an organisation established in 1931 by former members of Er Woo. The Singapore Chinese Orchestra is the only professional Chinese orchestra in Singapore, however amateur Chinese orchestras formed by clan associations, community centres and schools are common, with over 150 amateur Chinese orchestras formed. There are also chamber ensembles such as those of the Nanguan tradition from Siong Leng Musical Association. Drumming performances which accompany the traditional Lion Dance are also popular.

=== Malay ===
Music genres popular in neighbouring Malaysia and Indonesia, such as Dondang Sayang and Keroncong, were also popular among Malays in Singapore. Vocal performances accompanied by kompang and hadrah drums are among the most popular types of Malay music in Singapore, and may be performed during weddings and official functions. Another popular art is ghazal, it is unique to Singapore's cosmoplitan history as part of the Johor-Riau-Lingga sultanate where precedents to this art was brought by Punjabi Muslims and Sikhs to the island, spread with Temenggong Abdul Rahman moving his seat of power to Telok Blangah. Dikir barat is somewhat also popular despite its origins in Pattani of zero connections with Singapore being culturally related to Johor and the Riau Islands. A form of traditional opera called Bangsawan existed since the 19th century but had declined, although there are modern attempts at reviving the genre.

=== Indian ===
Hindustani and Karnatic music are two forms of Indian classical music that may be found in Singapore. Other forms of music that are popular are Bhajan and Bhangra music, and professional Bhangra troupes may perform at festivities and special events.

=== Peranakan ===
The Peranakans are descendants of early Chinese immigrants who had intermarried with the local Malay population, and had adopted, partly or fully, Malay customs. Their folk music is noted for its fusion of English in Malay-inspired tunes, largely because the Peranakans themselves are often conversant in both languages. Contemporary tunes continue to be composed based on the Peranakan culture, such as "Bunga Sayang" composed in 1994, a theme song from Dick Lee's musical "Kampung Amber". The song became an often-sung staple of the National Day Parade, and gained international exposure when it was performed for the opening ceremony of the 117th IOC Session at the Esplanade.

== Western classical music ==
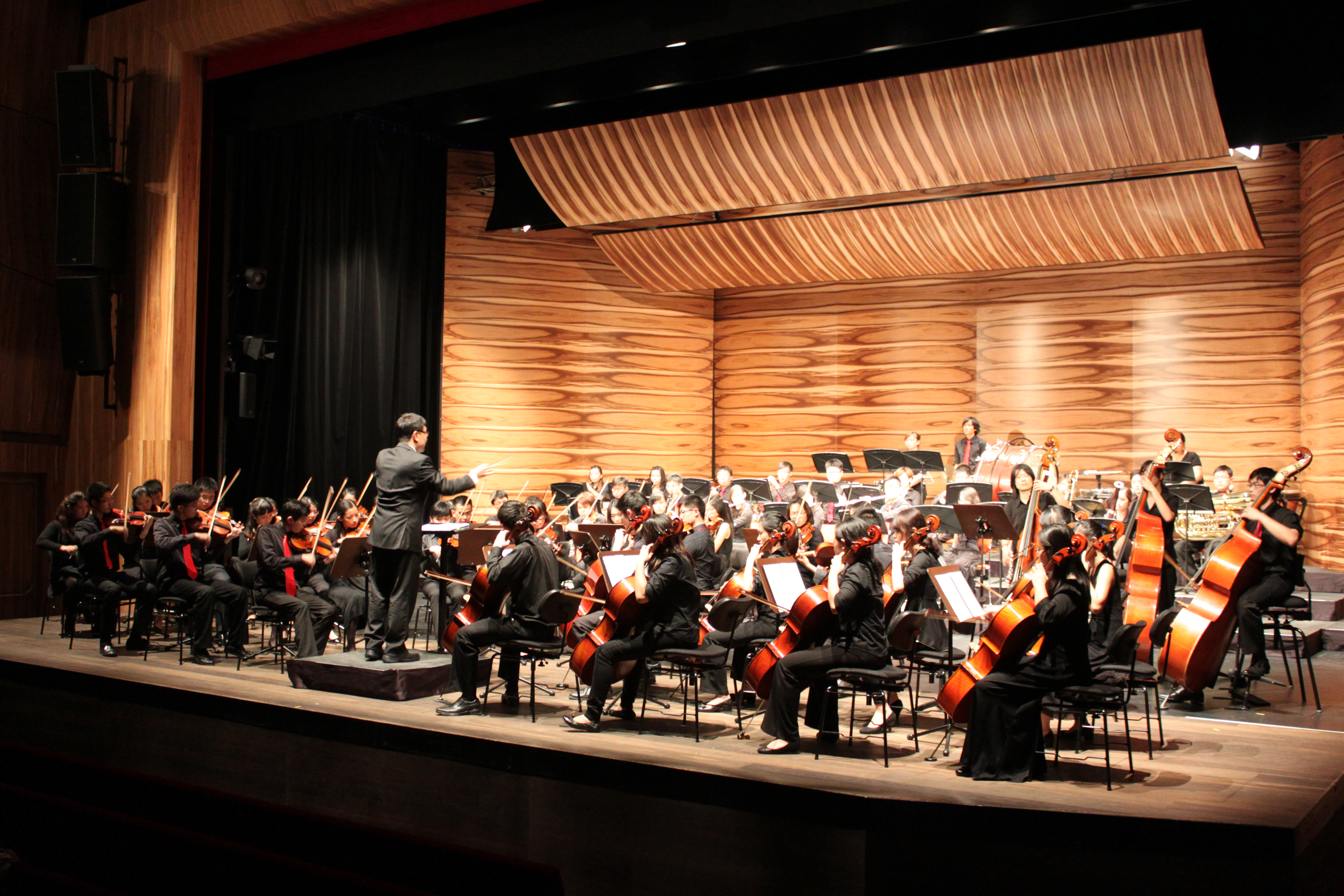
A concert by National University of Singapore Symphony Orchestra

Western classical music plays a significant role in the cultural life in Singapore, and at its center is the Singapore Symphony Orchestra (SSO) which was instituted in 1979. The main performance venue for the orchestra is the Esplanade Concert Hall, but it also performs in Victoria Concert Hall and gives the occasional free performances in parks. Other notable orchestras in Singapore include Singapore National Youth Orchestra which is funded by the Ministry of Education, the community-based Braddell Heights Symphony Orchestra, The Philharmonic Orchestra, Orchestra of the Music Makers, and National University of Singapore Symphony Orchestra. Many orchestras and ensembles are also found in secondary schools and junior colleges.

There are a few opera companies that present Western operas in Singapore: Singapore Lyric Opera which was founded in 1991, and New Opera Singapore established in 2011. There is also a lively local chamber music scene, which took off in 2007. A number of significant changes in the early 2000s boosted the development of the classical music scene in Singapore, in particular the building of the performing arts venue Esplanade - Theatres on the Bay, and the establishment of the first conservatory of Singapore, Yong Siew Toh Conservatory of Music.

Well-known classical musicians from Singapore include Lynnette Seah, Lim Soon Lee, Siow Lee Chin, Abigail Sin and Mikkel Myer Lee. Some, such as conductor Darrell Ang and Vanessa-Mae, are expat working overseas, there are however an increasing number of local musicians who are actively involved in the classical music scene of Singapore. Some of these classical musicians have ventured into other genres and taken their music to public places, such as the Lorong Boys, who sometimes perform in MRT trains.

== Rock music ==
Alternative and indie rock music influenced bands in the 1990s such as Concave Scream, Humpback Oak, The Padres, Oddfellows, Astreal, and Livionia. In the Pop/Rock genres were "KICK!", Lizard's Convention & Radio Active. According to a 1992 Straits Times report, in that year, 15 other albums were released on independent labels and around 200 local bands were writing their own music. The following year, songs by The Padres, CU1359, ESP and The Oddfellows were featured on Multitrack 3, a British Broadcasting Corporation radio programme.

Recently, alternative, metal, grindcore, punk rock and rock acts from Singapore who gained some profile outside Singapore include Analog Girl, Amateur Takes Control, Cockpit, John Klass, Firebrands, Stompin' Ground, Ling Kai, Inch Chua, Ronin, PsychoSonique, Anna Judge April, Electrico, Force Vomit, The Observatory, 4-Sides, Vermillion, West Grand Boulevard, Plainsunset, Etc., sub:shaman, Caracal, Popland, The Great Spy Experiment, Sky In Euphoria, Rancour, Saw Loser (formerly known as Pug Jelly), Gorbachev, Helga, Malex, A Vacant Affair, For Better Endings, Death Metal and Rudra, who are significant for creating the genre "Vedic Metal".

=== Metal ===
Metal has a small but not insignificant presence in Singapore's music scene. Many metal bands such as Iron Maiden, Exodus, Morbid Angel, Slayer, Dream Theater and Helloween made Singapore a stop in their tour, at venues such as Fort Canning Park and Singapore Indoor Stadium. Small to medium scale gigs are held almost weekly at locations such as BlackHole212 or The Substation. Most recently, on 15 February 2011, Iron Maiden played to a crowd of 12,000 at the Singapore Indoor Stadium.

There have also been many notable local metal bands from many varying subgenres in the growing underground scene. Special mention includes:

- Black metal stalwarts Impiety,
- Extreme Metal veterans Rudra who created a new metal genre called Vedic Metal and a cult following worldwide. The band has also attracted the attention of Musicologists. Several papers have been published about Vedic Metal and the band.
- Bastardized: Pioneer Doom Melodic Death metal band existing since 1993. "With Love, With Hate, With Grief, With Pain." EP released under Valentine Sound Productions 1994. Poetry styled album "The Over Burdened" expected release in 2016.
- Funeral Hearse signed by prominent American Metal Label Redefining Darkness Records, owned by Thomas Haywood of Aborted and Abigail Williams fame.
- Wormrot have been signed to the UK record label Earache Records since 2010.
- Local Death Metal "Assault" band new album "The Fallen Reich" features current Taiwan member of Parliament & "ChthoniC" Frontman Freddy Lim and Maldive metal band "Nothnegal" Guitarist Fufu.

There is however little support for metal in Singapore's mainstream media. The heavy metal scene in Singapore therefore has established its own ways of disseminating information by utilizing popular internet based social mediums such as Facebook, Twitter and blogs.

Some Metal music of this generation may be featured occasionally on Brader Bo's show, Vicious Volume of RIA 89.7fm.

=== Experimental/Improvised ===
Two Singapore rock bands of the 1970s and 1980s, Heritage and Zircon Lounge, showed tendencies to create music beyond conventional rock idioms. In the late 1980s, Corporate Toil baited audiences with noisy electronic performances influenced by industrial/new wave bands like Suicide or Einstürzende Neubauten. In the 1990s, Kelvin Tan produced literally dozens of albums of avant folk and improvised guitar, as well as assembling the short-lived Stigmata featuring bassist Ian Woo and saxophonist Kelvin Guoh. Zai Kuning, largely known as a visual artist and dancer, lived for a period in Japan and collaborated musically with Tetsu Saitoh, a famed Japanese cellist. Zai also created his own form of Malay folk and gypsy blues music, singing incantations in his deep tenor while playing a loose form of open tuning guitar.

By the late 1990s and into the 2000s, a group of experimental laptop artists appeared: George Chua, Yuen Chee Wai, Evan Tan, Ang Song Ming, and Chong Li-Chuan, the last having received the bachelor's and master's degrees in music at Goldsmiths College, University of London. Straddling the world of digital effects and acoustic instruments was the duo aspidistrafly, who eventually gained an enormous following in Japan, producing their own music and running their Kitchen. Label. The Observatory, a supergroup formed from the ashes of Leslie Low's folk rock Humpback Oak trio, have been widely regarded as one of the best bands in Singapore, with Yeow Kai Chai of The Straits Times writing, "No other Singapore band, past or present, has captured the imagination quite like The Observatory."

Musical outsiders Engineered Beautiful Blood (Shark Fung and Wei Nan) blazed a hot trail of no wave improvised rock, then stopped playing in 2009. However, their members eventually formed a larger improvised rock ensemble, I\D, which itself would splinter off into smaller groups and configurations. Shark Fung himself has been a key figure in the musical margins, with his idiosyncratic solo drums-and-electronics noise outfit Awk Wah, and forming the collective structured improv group BALBALAB with Wu Jun Han, Dennis Tan and Zai Tang in late 2014. Around the middle of the 2000s, another grouping calling themselves Under the Velvet Sky wowed audiences with their performances that evoked prog rock, free jazz, traditional Malay and Chinese music, and more. Again, the loose nature of the collective enabled them to create other projects such as Gulayu Arkestra, Five Leaves Left and Cactus - not to mention the solo efforts of members Jordan Johari Rais and Imran Abdul Rashid.

The independent record label Ujikaji has been credited for helping to promote experimental music. It has also promoted experimental music events at local venues, with some held in collaboration with The Observatory.

== Music venues ==
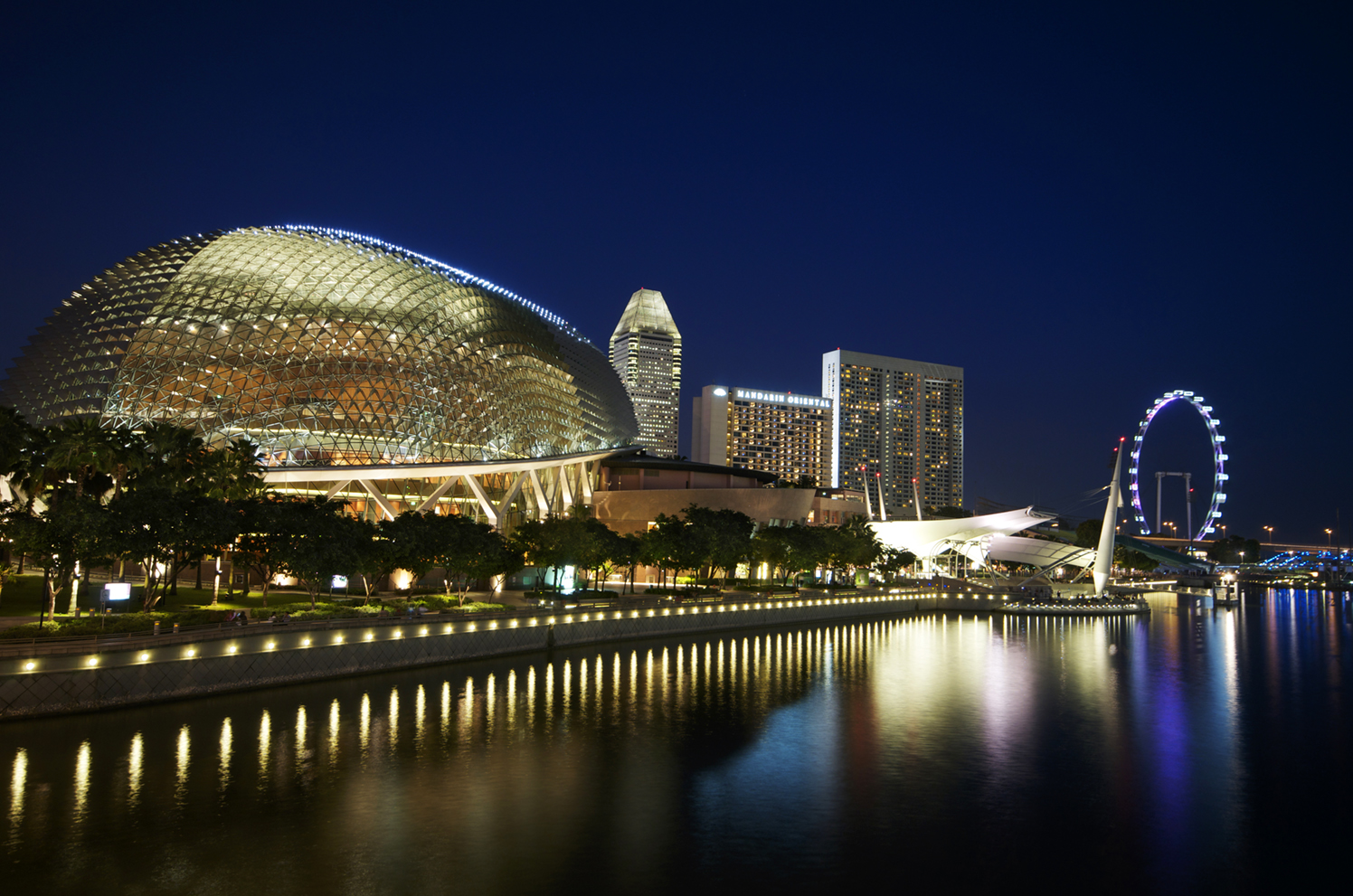
Esplanade – Theatres on the Bay in 2010.

The historic Victoria Theatre and Concert Hall was first constructed as a town hall in 1862. In 1905, the Victoria Memorial Hall was built as an expansion to the building; the two separate buildings would be linked by a clock tower, with the project formally completed in 1909. The venue would go on to host performing arts events such as music and theatre, as well as civic and political events. A multi-year refurbishment and reconstruction was completed in 2014.

Esplanade – Theatres on the Bay opened in 2002, succeeding the Victoria Theatre and Concert Hall as the main performing arts centre of Singapore. The complex includes a 1,600-seat concert hall, which became the new home venue of the Singapore Symphony Orchestra in 2003.

The Singapore Conference Hall is used as a base for the Singapore Chinese Orchestra. There are also many clubs and music bars that offer live music in the city, particularly in the Clarke Quay area.

== Music education ==
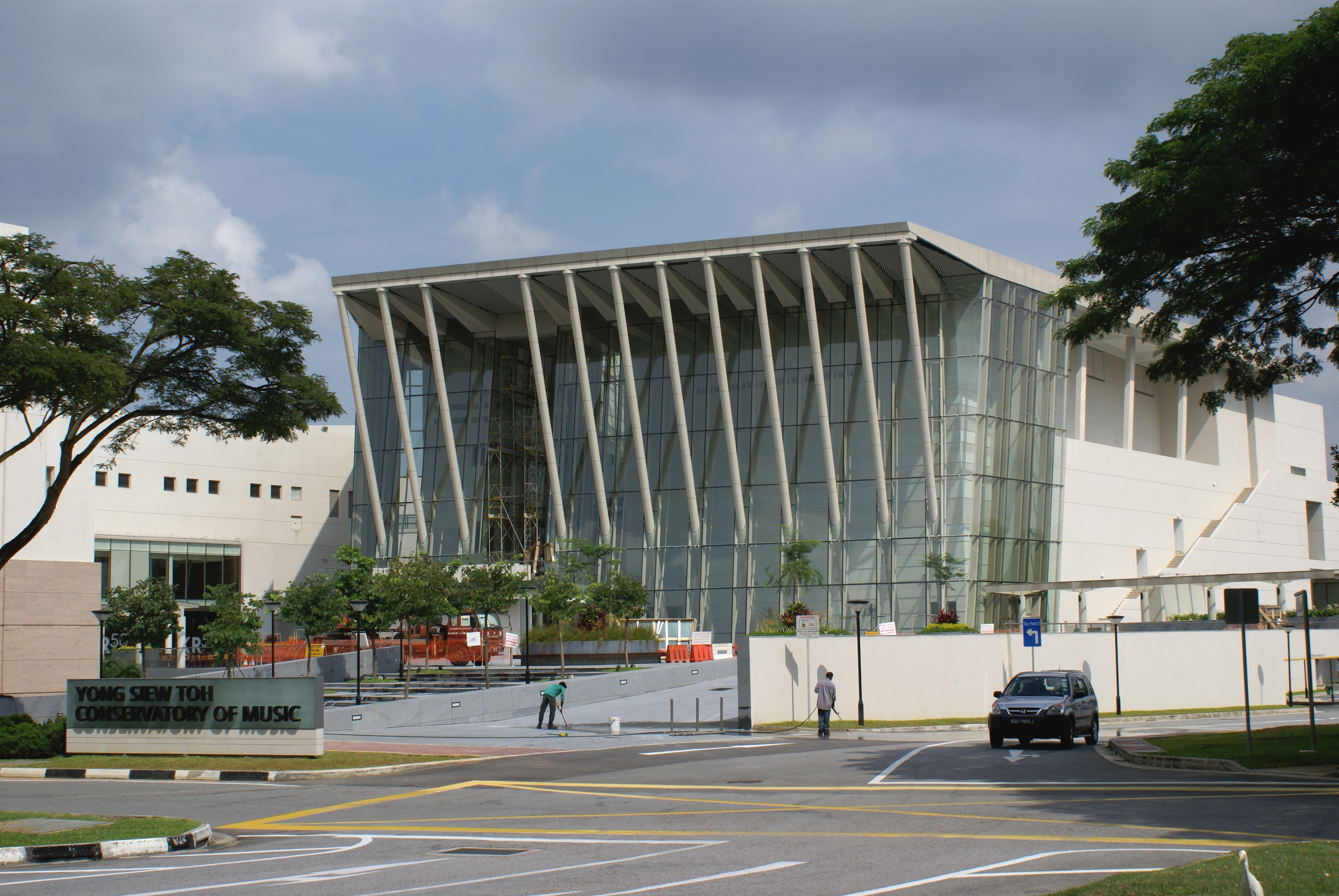
Yong Siew Toh Conservatory of Music in 2007.

In Singapore, music as a subject in education was first introduced in 1935, and today General Music Programme is offered to all students in primary and secondary schools. The Enhanced Music Programme, started in 2011, is offered as an upper secondary programme in selected schools. Tertiary music education is also available in Singapore – the Yong Siew Toh Conservatory of Music, which received its first student intake in 2003, is the first to offer a four-year full-time Bachelor of Music degree programme. The conservatory is part of the National University of Singapore founded in partnership with the Peabody Conservatory, and it serves as a centre of training for young musicians in the Asia Pacific region with full scholarship provided.

Music education is also offered at other institutions such as Nanyang Academy of Fine Arts, LASALLE College of the Arts, Raffles Music College and the School of the Arts.

== National Day songs ==
Of particular note to the Singaporean music scene is what are often collectively known as "National Day songs"—a category of patriotic music written as signature for Singapore's National Day parade. During the lead-up to National Day, the songs are taught at schools, and are played on state-owned radio and television to promote the parade.

The tradition began in the 1980s, stemming from "Operation Singalong"—a project conducted by the National Folk Songs Committee to help bolster the solidarity of Singapore's citizens by encouraging communal singing. The first examples of National Day songs were composed by Hugh Harrison, including "Stand Up for Singapore" (composed to mark the 25th anniversary of Singapore's independence), "Count On Me, Singapore" (1986), and "We Are Singapore" (1987), which glorified the development of the country's economy and national identity. Beginning in 1998, the songs began to have a more popular sound, being performed by local musicians. That year's song, "Home" by Kit Chan, carried a theme of encouraging overseas Singaporeans to return to their homeland, and has been considered one of the most popular National Day songs. There has generally been a new song each year, with exceptions (such as 2014, when older songs were reprised amid the poor reception of other recent National Day songs).

A survey conducted by the Lee Kuan Yew Centre For Innovative Cities in 2021 found that the most popular National Day songs usually had themes of nation-building, aspirations, and national identity.

An ad-hoc offshoot of these National Day songs are the songs specially composed for major events. A prominent example was the song "Moments of Magic", written by Hype Records CEO Ken Lim specially for Singapore's millennium celebrations towards the end of 1999. It was performed by three notable singers - Fann Wong, Tanya Chua and Elsa Lin. The music video was directed by Singapore filmmaker Eric Khoo.
