= Tim Nolan =

Tim Nolan may refer to:

- Tim Nolan (musician)
- Tim Nolan (politician)

== See also ==
- Timothy Nolen, American actor and baritone
