= Abigail Sin =

Singaporean concert pianist

Abigail Sin Si Ern (Chinese: 冼思恩; pinyin: Xiǎn Sī Ēn) (born 1992 in Singapore) is a Singaporean concert pianist. She was hailed by Time Asia magazine as a bona fide prodigy and one of Asia's "Small Wonders" when she was ten years old.

== Early life ==
Sin was born in Singapore, as a twin, in 1992. She also has a younger brother (born in 1994). She started reading at age two and stumbled across her first piano in her grandmother's basement at the age of four and a half. Sin was educated at Methodist Girls' School, where she excelled academically, particularly in mathematics and creative writing. She was also the top Primary School Leaving Examination student in Methodist Girls' School in 2004 and was awarded their Scholar Award. At the age of 14, she became the youngest student in the history of the National University of Singapore to enter the Yong Siew Toh Conservatory of Music at the National University of Singapore as a National Arts Council scholar, where she studied with Dr Thomas Hecht and was placed on dean's list every semester. Abigail graduated from Yong Siew Toh Conservatory of Music in 2010 at the age of 18 as the top student of her cohort with first class honours and winning the Lee Kuan Yew Gold Medal.

In September 2010, Sin embarked on her postgraduate degree at the Guildhall School of Music and Drama, where she studied under the tutelage of Joan Havill, returning to Singapore in 2012 to resume her studies with Professor Hecht. In May 2014 she completed a graduate diploma in piano performance.

== Career ==
In 2001, at the age of nine, Abigail Sin gave her debut solo recital at CHIJMES in Singapore.

Soon after, she made her concerto debuts performing with the Braddell Heights Symphony Orchestra, Singapore Symphony Orchestra and London Soloists Chamber Orchestra.

Since winning the honourable mention at the 2003 Pinnault International Piano Competition, Sin has won several prizes including first prize at the 2005 Virginia Waring International Piano Competition (Junior Concerto Category), Most Outstanding Performer award at the 14th International Festival of Young Musicians 'Kaunas' in Lithuania, first prize at the 17th Ibiza International Piano Competition (Young Pianist Category), first prize at the 3rd International Independent Music Competition 'Individualis' in Ukraine (11–14 years old), second prize at the 1st Schimmel USASU Young Artists International Junior Piano Competition in Arizona, US (13–15 years old), second prize at the 8th International Krainev Competition for Young Pianists in Ukraine (Junior Section) and first prize at the Viardo International Piano Competition in Texas, US (17 and Under Category).

In 2003, she was awarded the HSBC Youth Excellence Award for Musical Excellence. The year after, she gave her Esplanade - Theatres on the Bay debut performance with her own solo recital and a concerto performance to a full house of nearly two thousand. This gala concert raised over S$200,000 for The Straits Times School Pocket Money Fund.

In 2006, Abigail was invited to and performed a seven-concert tour of Ukraine, Lithuania and Germany.

In May 2009, Abigail was honoured at the inaugural President's Command Performance at the Esplanade Theatre in Singapore alongside prominent Singaporean artists such as legendary avant-garde pianist Margaret Leng Tan and pop sensations JJ Lin and Stephanie Sun.

Abigail has also performed at numerous state functions, including a state banquet at the Istana for HRH Queen Elizabeth II in 2006.

In December 2009, Abigail Sin was named the first Young Steinway Artist. in South East Asia.
