= Aspidistrafly =

Singaporean ambient duo

- Origin: Singapore
- Genres: Ambient; experimental; electronic
- Works: Discography
- Years active: 2002–present
- Label: KITCHEN. LABEL
- Publisher: Inpartmaint Inc. / p*dis
- Members: April Lee; Ricks Ang
- Website: aspidistrafly.com

Aspidistrafly is a Singaporean duo formed in 2002 and comprising vocalist and composer April Lee and producer Ricks Ang. They have released three studio albums, I Hold A Wish For You (2008), A Little Fable (2011), and Altar of Dreams (2022). Lee and Ang are married to each other.

== Members and early lives ==
=== April Lee ===
April Lee was born in 1984. She began playing the guitar at a young age, ultimately learning ways to pair her guitar playing and singing around age thirteen despite having no musical background nor musicians in her family. She learned to record her singing over her playing on a tape recorder. Lee describes her musical development as intimately linked with other artistic endeavours including drawing, writing, scents, and sewing, many of which she herself did. She recounted horror soap operas from the 1980s being one of the first things she "absorbed as a child," particularly speaking of the content's "distorted reflections and repetitions."

=== Ricks Ang ===
Ricks Ang was born on 31 March 1980. He was heavily embrewed with the biggest hits of 1980s and 1990s Mandopop, much of which was inspired by Japanese originals. This included art outside of music, like manga including GeGeGe no Kitarō and Dragon Ball, the music and art of early Spitz and Luna Sea, and the visuals of Rinko Kawauchi, Harata Heiquiti, and Hideki Nakajima. Ang even recalled possibly being draw to Japanese influence after making many Japanese friends in his kindergarten class. By his teens, Ang had started listening to shoegaze and dream pop, which led him to discover the likes of Spitz, Fishmans, and visual kei in 1995. He said the collective inspiration of those artists coming from David Sylvian brought him to jazz, ECM, and ambient musicians including "Jon Hassell, Mark Isham, Ryuichi Sakamoto, Fennesz, Takagi Masakatsu, among many others."

Like Lee, Ang began experimenting with a tape recorder as old as age fifteen, later recalling the experience of discovering that "recording inside marbled bathrooms gave a nice reverb."

== History ==
=== 2000–2001: Beginnings before Aspidistra ===
Lee and Ang met in early 2000 through mutual friends, during which Ang was scouting for a vocalist in his a shoegaze band he was a part of. The four-person band was led by Ang who was the drummer and Lee the vocalist and guitarist. However, the band split up in 2001 after the other two members left. Ang and Lee decided to continue playing together despite to split, during which they formulated design ideas for what would later become KITCHEN. LABEL., initially just called "Kitchen." Ang described in an interview that the rise of social media following their formation, particularly on Myspace, where they started to build a community of like-minded artists.

=== 2002–2007: Formation of Aspidistra, Children's Haiku Garden, and The Ghost of Things ===
==== Forming Aspidistra and release of Children's Haiku Garden demo EP ====
Lee and Ang formed the Aspidistra duo in 2002, though they have described having formulated the name as early as 2001. That year, the duo released their debut demo extended play (EP), Children's Haiku Garden. The title is derived from the duo's sampling of children playing on a playground.

==== Release of The Ghost of Things EP and founding of KITCHEN. LABEL ====
On 17 July 2004, the duo released their second EP, The Ghost of Things. The album was limited to 100 hand-painted and individually numbered CD-Rs. The EP was self-released under KITCHEN. LABEL, created by Ang that year, which the duo said was intended to allow them to release their music purely according to their own vision. The name derives from Japanese author Banana Yoshimoto's 1988 novel, Kitchen, which had influenced seme of the duo's work before they began working on Altar of Dreams. The novel had permeated into the duo's sound, using the slice-of-life influence from the novel to reflect—in what Ang described as—working with collaborators which "emphasise atmosphere and texture over everything else." In 2005, Ang founded "Kitchen.," with Lee as co-founder—initially serving as a design studio rather than a label, during which Ang designed the art direction for projects of clients. Within the next two years, Ang founded the "record label arm" of Kitchen., effectively folding in KITCHEN. LABEL.

Through their MySpace community, including with artists that would later be signed to KITCHEN. LABEL, the duo received an increasing number of offers to perform in Japan. Thus, in 2007, the duo went on their first tour around Asia, performing in venues around Japan, Hong Kong, Macau, Thailand, and Malaysia. During the tour, they met their MySpace "friends" and other like-minded Japanese artists including Haruka Nakamura, Fjordne, Akira Kosemura, Chihei Hatakeyama, Ironomi, and others. Ang later described "fondly" remembering a meeting with Carl Stone who attended one of the duo's shows, which Ang described as "one of the pioneers of live computer music" and said demonstrated how the duo was "at the right place and time" for developing their style. The duo eventually adopted Japan as their second home in 2007, which further inspired their artistic direction. Ang described Japan's emotive cycle of seasons and landscapes as integral, which neither Lee nor Ang were able to experience in Singapore.

=== 2008–2011: I Hold A Wish For You and A Little Fable ===
==== Release of I Hold A Wish For You ====
The duo released their debut studio album, I Hold A Wish For You, on 12 July 2008. Ang said the album drew references from Yoshimoto's 1986 novella Moonlight Shadow. Lee said she also drew inspiration from film directors Yasujirō Ozu and Hirokazu Kore-eda, whose works she interpreted to "speak of both darkness and light and also the everyday." In an interview with Textura magazine, Ang said their music aimed to "invoke an emotion or a forgotten memory." Lee added that she, in addition to processing and rearranging lyrics, sought this through diverse instrumentation.

The album was published by Inpartmaint Inc. / p*dis, which Ang said picked up the group "at the start of [their] formation." He added that p*dis helped bring their music early on to "major" stores like Tower Records, HMV, and Disk Union. The published and duo continue to work together presently, which Ang attributed to their "deep understanding of what we do," before adding that their long-term collaboration made p*dis "feel like family."

==== Writing and release of A Little Fable ====
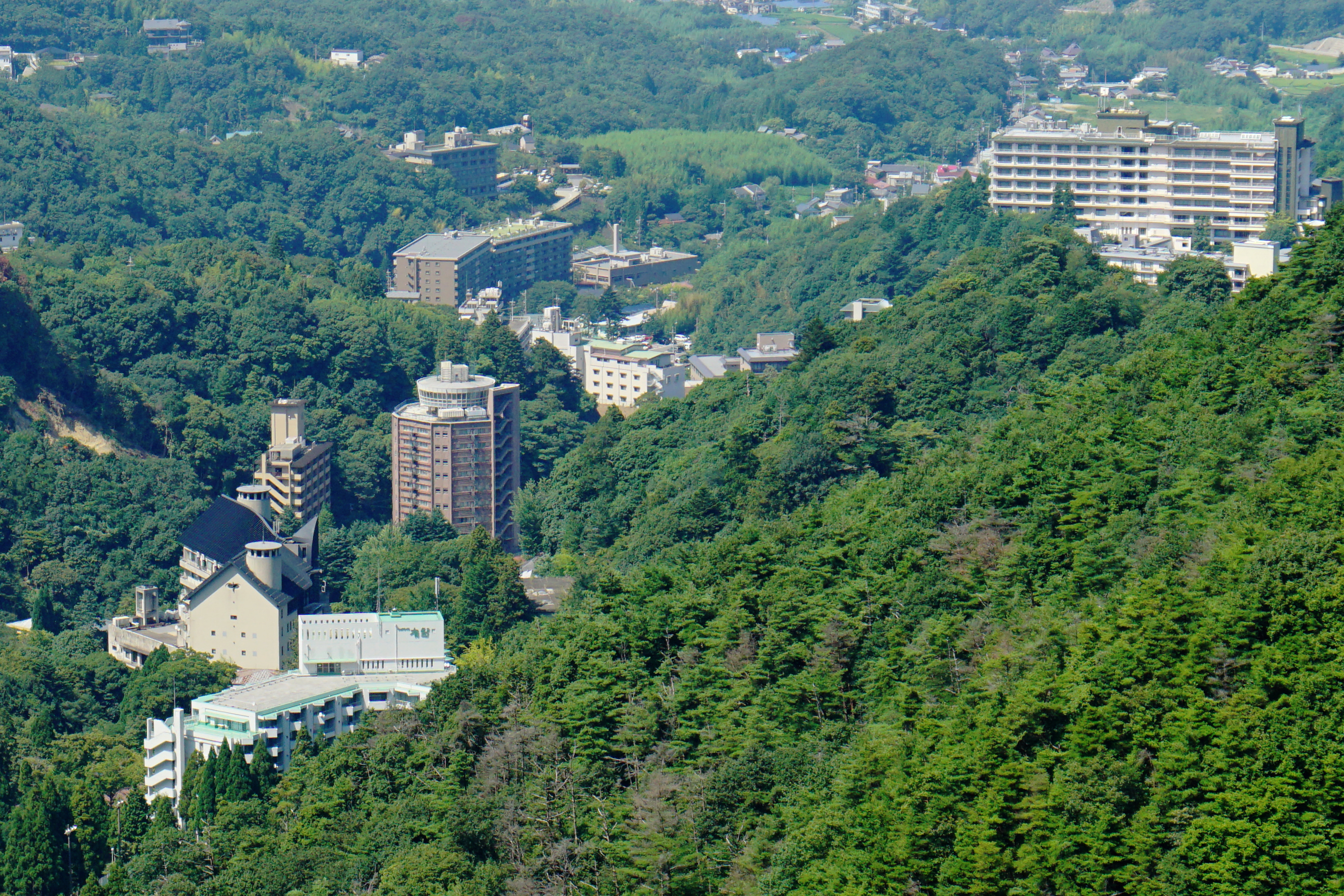
A landscape in Kobe, Hyōgo Prefecture in 2017.

Lee and Ang worked on their second studio album, A Little Fable, in Tokyo. Lee was initially inspired by the films of Ingmar Bergman and Andrei Tarkovsky, and antique jewelry. Lee described this two-year period of developing the album's music and artwork as the most "incisive" moments in her artistic career, being heavily inspired by the landscapes of Kobe. The duo's most critically acclaimed track on the album, "Landscape With A Fairy," took the longest time perfect, according to Lee. Its music video was recorded on a cottage belonging to the "Alice" couple; the couple's hospitality and surrounding nature's beauty inspired Lee, who worked with photographer Miu Nozaka in what would make up much of the A Little Fable's visual direction in its art book. She said developing these visual and the music on the album were interdependent "like the rain cycle."

The duo released A Little Fable on 15 December 2011. Lee said the duo collaborated on tracks with artists including Nakamura, ironomi, Kosemura, and Ruibyat. Kyo Ichinose wrote some string arrangements, including "Landscape With A Fairy." Ang said it took both Lee and him five to ten years to "fully grasp the album’s journey and evolution," noting that they did not have "cottagecore" in mind when composing the album.

=== 2012–present: A Little Fable remasters and Altar of Dreams ===
Before beginning to write Altar of Dreams and after the release of A Little Fable, the group entered a brief hiatus, during which Lee formally left KITCHEN. LABEL in 2013 to pursue personal interests in fashion and other creative endeavours. However, the duo's close bond led her to continue working on many of the studio's projects. That same year, the duo began to feel the pressure to begin work on a new album.

==== Writing of Altar of Dreams ====
Lee and Ang began working on Altar of Dreams for the entire, "tough," decade before its release, with Ang having explicitly said that he was working on recording and mixing Altar of Dreams as early as 2016. Although the album would be released over a decade since A Little Fable, Ang said that "it’s not like we [Aspidistra] just stopped and forgot about it," instead being a "constant" for the entire 10 years which Lee said was necessary to release the album "at the right time" and not regret the final product. He added that unlike prolific artists, the duo "only benefitted from working at a snail’s pace" to perfect details. Nevertheless, Ang expressed that there wasn't a moment "without feeling bothered that it [the album] was not finished" in light of the duo's radio silence to fans—ultimately making him feel "very guilty" despite Ang having acknowledged that "that's life." Ang recounts discovering new influences which made their way into Altar of Dreams, including 1980s and 1990s ambient pop music from Japan and Asia, New-age music, musique concrète, and compositions of Hungarian composer Béla Bartók. He said Shazam was important in his discovery of new music—especially in finding smaller, niche artists like Chan Wing Leung, Chen Shye-Shing, and early songs by Jang Pil-Soon.

The album's completion was slightly slowed after Ang developed tinnitus in 2015, having not fully recovered from it even upon the release of Altar of Dreams; Ang said he stopped doing work on the album for approximately five years, until 2021. Around that time, the duo scrapped some progress on the album which they then pieced back together. Lee later shared that the track which would later receive a music video, "Companion to Owls," became so personal that Lee and Ang "spent years recording and rerecording [it] to perfection." They worked closely with Ichinose on Altar of Dreams during this time, which they "greatly respect" thanks to his work on the duo's "monumental" track "Landscape With A Fairy;" Ang said they entrusted Ichinose with much of the piano and string composition for the album.

==== I Hold A Wish For You and A Little Fable remasters ====
Sometime during this period, the duo married after having dated since 2008. This was accompanied by the duo moving into a home they built before the COVID-19 pandemic hit, in 2019. Ang described Lee as having "taken charge of Aspidistrafly" while he focused on running KITCHEN. LABEL, which Ang said was more fitting to their respective interests. A year prior, the duo reissued their debut album, I Hold A Wish For You, including a bonus track "In Sundown Light."

A Little Fable gained a second life through TikTok, Twitter, and Spotify around 2018 by what NME and Ang described as a "wave of cottagecore enthusiasts" or "fans." Ang recalled that in addition to seeing an upwards curve on the duo's Spotify page, it jumped growing to 2.3 million monthly listeners by 2016. Around this time, KITCHEN. LABEL grew significantly, which Ang reflected encouraged the duo's "symbiosis" with the other artists, which shaped much of its sound in the latter half of Altar of Dreams' creation. In part thanks to its renewed attention, a remastered version of A Little Fable was released in anticipation of its ten-year anniversary, on 26 November 2021. The reissue featured two bonus tracks recorded in Tokyo. Lee said seeing the renewed support for A Little Fable on Twitter and listeners' praise for the duo's music to help them through depression gave her "positive pressure" to speed up the completion of Altar of Dreams. Ang described working "non-stop" on Altar of Dreams throughout 2021.

==== Release of Altar of Dreams and reception ====
The single "The Voice of Flowers" was released ahead of Altar of Dreams on 3 December, which Lee said took the "longest time to perfect." Nakamura, Ichinose, and Araki Shin contributed to the track. It was released alongside a music video directed by Daisuke Shimada. Lee described that the music video intended to capture her experiences being shaken by the Fukushima nuclear accident in 2011, which subsequently led her to worry for her friends and visit one of their hometowns in Nagano—a visit during which she recognized the contrast to her upbringing in the "convoluted city" of Singapore. Lee worked closely with Nakamura and other contributors when writing his 2010 album, Twilight, on which Aspidistrafly featured. Lee, noticing his contribution to Twilight, invited Shin to contribute to their own album—where he played and arranged flute, saxophone, and other instruments—shaping much of the instrumentation on "The Voice of Flowers."

The duo released their third studio album, Altar of Dreams, on 25 February 2022 alongside a music video for "Companion To Owls" directed by Ivanho Harlim and Shysilia Novita. Lee described her "role as a songwriter" as "purely that of a dreamer imagining," often being inspired by her lucid dreams when writing songs for the album, many of which she described as "warped, unintelligible, and sometimes macabre." However, some of the tracks came from older projects, including the opening track, "How To Find A Marblewing," which Lee said was her first "sound collage" of collected samples, created in 2006. Ang described wanting to make the album feel like one cohesive image, mixing Lee's singing with several samples made by KITCHEN. LABELmates, including Sugai Ken, Nakamura, Ichinose, Ichiko Aoba, and Shin; they recorded with Nakamura at Studio Camel House in Yamanashi Prefecture. Ichinose and Seigen Tokuzawa were, according to Ang, "invaluable" studio assistants. Both said Aoba and Nakamura are long-time friends and "musical soulmates." He also drew inspiration from the 1980s, which to him was "uncannily reminiscent" on the duo's Singaporean childhoods which, due to urban development, "no longer exist."

In Singapore, the duo wrote the tracks on the "3rd floor of a Chinese-baroque styled shophouse" and recorded guitars at the defunct SAE studio. In Japan, they laid down other instrument tracks, including a string section and piano at Sound City Setagaya studio with sound engineer Naoto Shibuya, and recorded the final vocals and did the mixing the home they moved into in 2019, which gave Lee the "emotional space" to sing in. Like A Little Fable, Ang hoped that, "in due time," listeners would "unfold" the "story" behind Altar of Dreams. Similarly, he reflected on the album and KITCHEN. LABEL, saying the duo's musical process of working with "the right collaborators" and not "dictating the outcome" could "only act as further fuel for the music and growth of the label." The Singaporean music magazine Life in Arpeggio described the album as "a bewitching journey of stray components that convene harmoniously," referencing "recorded samples à la musique concrète, fairytale orchestral elements, lingering guitar excursions and mesmeric vocals that caress and haunt."

==== Shibuya performance and present quasi-hiatus ====
The duo performed at KITCHEN. LABEL's fifteenth anniversary show at Shibuya WWW in Tokyo on 15 November 2023, which was their first live performance after a six-year hiatus. Although headlined by Meitei, the duo premiered songs from Altar of Dreams alongside classics from A Little Fable, joined by Ichinose playing piano, Shione Yukawa playing classical guitar and harmonizing vocally with Lee, and the Tokuzawa Seigen Quartet playing strings. The future of the duo remained uncertain as Ang expressed that Lee's "enigmatic qualities" would largely decide whether the anniversary performance was the duo's last or whether an album would "materialize" between the next year or the next decade. However, he did imply of a "next one." in an interview from January 2022.

The group has, thus, entered a quasi-hiatus, remaining active in musical scenes, including featuring on the song "Traces in the window" on Disinblud's—a duo composed of Rachika Nayar and Nina Keith—self-titled album Disinblud, released 18 July 2025. The alto range in which Lee sang on the track was described by Minna Zhou of Pitchfork as "dark silhouettes from behind a pane: 'a stray creature,' 'a stanza,' 'the spleen of existence'"—likening the sound to that of American musician, Grouper.

== Artistry ==
=== Influence ===
Lee said fashion designer Serge Lutens and surrealist artist Salvador Dalí were her primary inspirations. She said that she often "hoards" inspirational items like collected memories, sounds, images, and objects. Ang said his were both the music and art of German label ECM Records. Ang also said the Mandopop influences from his childhood continued to resonate with him; he also mentioned having a "soft spot" for acoustic guitar, including artists like Phil Keaggy, Ralph Towner, and Masami Satoh. In a 2018 interview, Ang said his three most treasured records were Hiroshi Yoshimura's Wave Notation 1: Music for Nine Post Cards (1982), Seigén Ono's Seigén (1984), and Aragon's Aragon (1985). By 2022, Ang had a collection of approximately 700 albums in vinyls and CDs.

Although the duo has roots in shoegaze, Ang said they were more inspired by achieving ethereal quality à la Cocteau Twins or David Sylvian. Lee said that while many artists hold onto their background for inspiration, she expressed that for her personally:

"I love it when I hear a melody and cannot put a finger on what kind of environment or where it had been composed."

=== Musical style ===
While the duo was born from a former shoegaze band, And said his and Lee's goal "wasn’t to become the next Slowdive or Ride." Lee said it was "perfectly fine if a listener wants to decipher how I [Lee] arrived at the [songs'] story," but ultimately hoped that the duo's music gave others the "courage to question, to imagine, to remember and to feel."

Lee said she achieved a soft-spoken quality in her lyrics, which has been likened to the singing of Vashti Bunyan, thanks to recording her vocals and guitar playing during the "witching hours." She achieves its impromptu, "human" quality by blurring the lines between improvising and composing. Ang said he shaped the instrumentation and textures of songs around Lee's lyrics, while "respect[ing] the[ir] characteristics." The duo hoped the dense instrumentation of their project could "act as a vehicle for musical discovery."

The group's musical narrative is shaped around April Lee, who serves as Aspidistrafly's "protagonist." In numerous of the duo's visuals, including album covers, Lee is featured.

=== Marketing ===
The group does not advertise heavily as it hopes to be discovered naturally. Their music is released under KITCHEN. LABEL and distributed by pdis*.

== Other ventures ==
Outside of Aspidistarfly, Lee is a creative director for fashion editorials and photographer, having exhibited in numerous cities, and Ang manages KITCHEN. LABEL.

== Discography ==
Aspidistrafly discography
- Studio albums: 3
- EPs: 2
- Singles: 1
- Music videos: 3

=== Studio albums ===
Title	Details
I Hold A Wish For You (Note: The album is sometimes stylized in all lowercase letters.)	Released: 12 July 2008; Label: KITCHEN. LABEL; Formats: CD, (Note: The original CD was also issued with an art book. A reissue of the CD was released in 2018 including a bonus track, "in sundown light," which was unreleased prior to its inclusion on this reissue.) digital download, streaming
A Little Fable	Released: 15 December 2011; Label: KITCHEN. LABEL; Formats: CD, (Note: The original CD was also issued with a 48-page art book. A reissue of the CD was released in 2014 including two bonus track "Landscape With A Fairy" (Live in Fujimigaoka Church, Tokyo) and "Endless Dreamless" (Live in Fujimigaoka Church, Tokyo).) vinyl, (Note: The album's vinyl was only pressed following the release of the album's remaster in 2021.) digital download, streaming
Altar of Dreams	Released: 25 February 2022; Label: KITCHEN. LABEL; Formats: cassette, CD, vinyl, digital download, streaming

=== Extended plays ===
Title	Details
Children's Haiku Garden	Released: 2002; Label: self-released; Formats: digital download, streaming
The Ghost of Things	Released: 17 July 2004; Label: KITCHEN. LABEL; Formats: digital download, streaming

=== Singles ===
==== As lead artist ====
Title	Year	Album/EP
"The Voice of Flowers"	2021	Altar of Dreams

==== As featured or collaborative artist ====
Title	Year	Album
"紫陽花" (Hydrangea) (いろのみ [Ironomi] featuring Aspidistrafly)	2015	Niji
"光" (Light) (Haruka Nakamura featuring Aspidistrafly)	2020	Twilight (10th Anniversary Deluxe Edition)
Traces in the Window (Disiniblud featuring Aspidistrafly)	2025	Disiniblud

=== Music videos ===
Title	Year	Director
"Landscape with a Fairy"	2011	Rika M. Orrery
"The Voice of Flowers"	2021	Daisuke Shimada
"Companion to Owls"	2022	Ivanho Harlim and Shysilia Novita

== See also ==
- Ichiko Aoba
- Ryuichi Sakamoto
