= Tokyo Square =

Singaporean band

- Origin: Singapore
- Genres: Pop; rock
- Years active: 1984–present
- Members: Max Surin; Linda Elizabeth Dana; Adam Surin; Fazli Dana; Mayuni Omar
- Past members: Gavin Cardozar; Peter Han; Peter Eidill; Tony Fonseca; John Choo (deceased); Latiff Jalil; Rahim Othman; Helmi Abdullah; Baser Sarimin; Mostafah Lamit

Tokyo Square is a Singaporean band formed by lead singer Linda Elizabeth Dana and guitarist Peter Han in 1984. After receiving regular gigs at a theater disco lounge, the band was then joined by Dana's half brother, singer Max Surin with four other technical members.

A year after their formation, Tokyo Square recorded a rendition of the song "Within You'll Remain" in 1985, a song originally performed by Hong Kong band Chyna, for the WEA Singapore compilation entitled Class Acts. Tokyo Square's version topped the charts in their home country and Thailand. Popularity of Tokyo Square is not confined to Singapore, as they have developed a following in many other Asian countries and also internationally with "Within You'll Remain" becoming a substantial radio hit in many other Southeast Asian countries throughout 1985 and 1986.

== History ==
In 1984, Tokyo Square was first formed by lead singer Linda Elizabeth Dana and guitarist Peter Han in Singapore. The group started out as a cover band with regular gigs at Rainbow Lounge, Singapore's first theatre disco lounge. Dana's half brother, singer Max Surin, and four other members later joined the group, including: saxophonist Henry Pereira, drummer Tony Fonseca, keyboardist Clarence Tan and bassist Peter Idil. Being the band leader and also the only female member of group, Dana sees herself as "the mama of the family."

=== The success of "Within You'll Remain" ===
In 1985, they recorded a rendition of "Within You'll Remain", a song written by Peter Wong(黃良昇) and Donald Ashley for his Hong Kong band Chyna, originally released in 1983. It was chosen and produced by Singaporean band The Quests' member, the late producer-guitarist Reggie Verghese. Verghese was specifically looking for a song which sounded ethnic because he thought it would do well in the Singapore market. By adding their own "twist" to the original, the new version contains a guzheng opening riff with its mix of Oriental and Western instrumentation. The rendition was reportedly attributed to singer Max Surin's love interest, Nancy Wong. He wanted to create a more oriental feel to the song to dedicate it to Nancy who was someone who has held a special place in his heart for a long time. "We just played around with it," said bassist Peter Eidill. "We added in guitar, we added in drums, a bit of percussion and then I fooled around with a funky bass line."

"Within You'll Remain" and a new track called "Silent Talk", produced by Ken Lim, were later added to the WEA Singapore-released compilation called Class Acts, features works by home-grown bands like Gingerbread, Heritage, Zircon Lounge, and Speedway. At first, "Within You'll Remain" did not receive much airplay in Singapore when it was released. According to Surin, it was only after it topped Bangkok's pop charts in January 1986 that the song became an "earworm" among the Singapore audience. Furthermore, it was so popular in their hometown that it remained on cable radio Rediffusion's top 10 list for five straight weeks.

The compilation then sold 23,000 copies within the three months of its release and is said to have gone Platinum with 500,000 units over the years. "We were shocked ourselves," said Dana. "Never did we think that it could be the one-hit wonder that it is." Keyboardist Gavin Cardozar found the song's melody to be very catchy: "From a two-year-old to a 90-year-old, they liked it. Everybody just liked it." Singaporean music producer Leonard Soosay also thought their version was "a beautiful adaptation", stating: "They made it even better because they introduced elements of pop into it and it became more radio-friendly." Singaporean publication The Straits Times claimed the track helped set a high standard in the country's recording quality and in terms of sales as well. "The media did a lot for [the album]. The Singapore Broadcasting Corporation was responsible for making "Within You'll Remain" a hit by playing all the time," Surin commented.

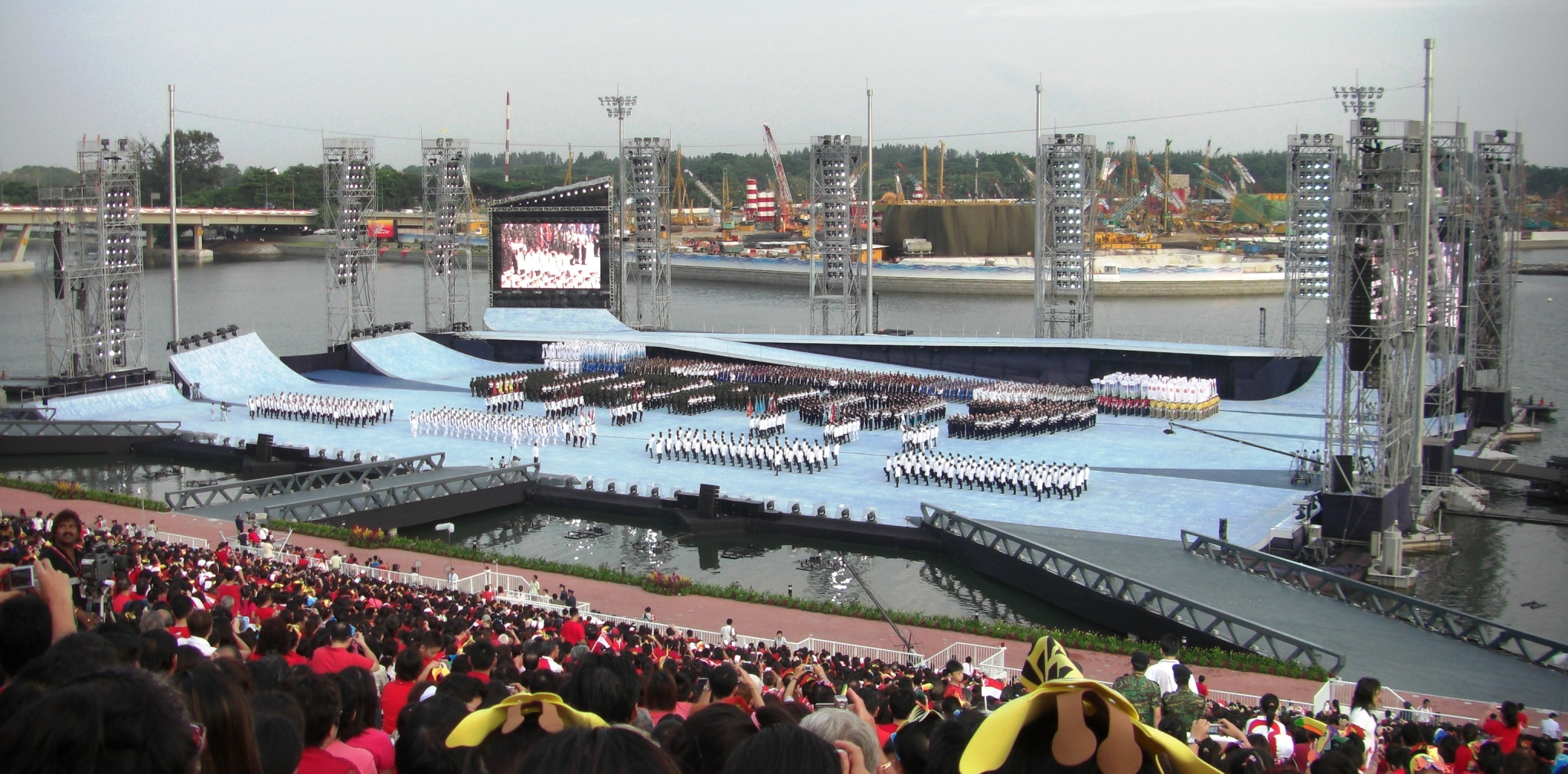
In 1986, Tokyo Square became the first rock group to perform in front of 50,000 people before Singapore National Day Parade occurs.

Thanks to the success of the track, the band found themselves inundated with requests to play it every night when they were performing at Rainbow Lounge. They performed the song during television appearances and Surin remembers singing it from the top of a cherry picker at the monthly Orchard Road Street Party in the 1980s. On 9 August 1986, Tokyo Square became the first rock group been featured before the parade of Singapore National Day Parade. The band performed "Within You'll Remain" and changed the lyrics in the chorus to "Wo ai ni, Singapore," which means "I Love You, Singapore" in Mandarin. "It was unbelievable. 50,000 people were singing to the chorus," Cardoza recalls. "Everybody knew the chorus, it's so catchy." During this time, "Within You'll Remain" was said to be a hit across many countries in Asia.

=== Line-up changes and Surin's solo career ===
Dana recalls the times after the success of the song: "There was no fortune, only fame." Surin adds: "Each of us received the first one or two cheques and then, no more. It's not that the recording company didn't pay Tokyo Square... The fault was within the band." It turned out that the contract between the band and the recording company had been signed by only one person and was not countersigned by the other members, so the signatory was not legally bound to distribute payment to the rest of the band members. "We were naive. We were too eager to cut our first song," he says, adding that "the debacle is water under the bridge." "I didn't take it personally. The album gave us a big break and helped my career. Instead of condemning this person, I should be thankful."

On 19 August 1986, they released two new tracks called "Oriental City" and "Without Your Love" in the second Class Acts album. After this, Surin and Dana appears on the compilation called Canton Rock, which was a collection of Cantonese tracks translated to English and "rocked up" to widen marketability.

In December 1986, it was reported that Surin, Tony Fonseca and Peter Han had disbanded to form another pop-rock group, furthermore, their popularity also suffered at the time because they failed to produce another successful track like "Within You'll Remain". Dana later set about getting new members who "got to shape" pretty quickly. The group spent two years playing in Japan at the Rosemarie Club at Roppongi, Minato, Tokyo and Nanja Munja Club in Nagoya.

Surin's relationship with the band was reportedly "strained and frayed" during this time. The band then extended only to a gig-to-gig basis. Surin stated: "I laid down terms to the band about this solo thing. There won't be any clashes." However, he added: "I need Tokyo Square for night-club work."

The Government of Singapore then asked Surin to contribute his vocal in three public campaigns including the Singapore Air Force, a then-newly set-up kidney foundation and a song with the message of "The best that we can be".

In 1987, Surin released his first solo album called True Words which features cover versions of hit songs from the America, Japan, (Germany), Indonesia with some original tracks. "The album also gave me a chance to prove myself. With it, I can do shows apart from Tokyo Square," he said. After Surin struck out on his own with Ken Lim as his producer in early 1987, he continued recording different versions of the hit on his solo albums so as to gain recognition among his audience, which spanned different markets across Southeast Asia. "We had a techno version, a ballad version, a rock version and a Thai ethnic version. We replaced ‘I love you’ in the chorus with ‘chan rak kun’," he says. He rejoined Tokyo Square in the same year.

In 1993, John Choo, the band's former keyboardist, made headlines when he died of methanol poisoning at a drug rehabilitation center.

=== Recent projects ===
The group are still asked to perform "Within You’ll Remain" at reunion gigs. At the Celebrate SG50 New Year countdown show at The Float at Marina Bay, Surin and Dana with helps from John Molina and Ann Hussein, performed "Within You’ll Remain" at the concert. To celebrate SG50, Channel NewsAsia's special national day series Reunions reunites former members of Tokyo Square on 3 August 2015. In May 2016, Warner Music Singapore released new remastered versions of two albums Class Acts and Class Acts 2.

Surin is now a resident singer at the Singapore-owned Modz Bar in Chengdu, China, while Dana is the resident singer at Swissôtel The Stamford’s cocktail bar, City Space, in Singapore.

== Members ==
- Max Surin – vocals (current)
- Linda Elizabeth – vocals (current)
- Adam Surin – bass (current; reported in 2015)
- Mayuni Omar – keyboards (current; reported in 2015)
- Fazli Dana – drums (current; reported in 2015)
- Latiff Jalil (reported in 1988)
- Rahim Othman (reported in 1987)
- Helmi Abdullah (reported in 1988)
- Baser Sarimin (reported in 1987)
- Mostafah Lamit (reported in 1988)
- Gavin Cardozar – keyboard
- Peter Eidill – bass
- Peter Han – guitarist (1984–1986)
- Tony Fonseca – drum (1984–1986)
- John Choo – keyboard (1984–1991)
- Henry Pereira – saxophone (1984–1986)
- Clarence Tan – keyboard (1984–1986)

== List of recorded songs ==
- "Within You'll Remain" (originally performed by Chyna, written by Don Ashley, appears on Class Acts in 1985)
- "Silent Talk" (appears on Class Acts in 1985)
- "Oriental City" (written by Stephen D. Joseph, appears on Class Acts 2 in 1986)
- "Without Your Love" (appears on Class Acts 2 in 1986)
