= The Philharmonic Orchestra =

Singaporean amateur orchestra

The Philharmonic Orchestra (Singapore)
- Orchestra
- Short name: TPO
- Former name: Philharmonic Chamber Orchestra Society
- Founded: 1998; 27 years ago
- Location: Singapore
- Concert hall: Victoria Concert Hall
- Principal conductor: Lin Juan
- Music director: Lim Yau
- Website: www.tpo.org.sg

The Philharmonic Orchestra (TPO) is an amateur orchestra in Singapore, initiated as a project by Maestro Lim Yau in 1998. The orchestra consists of adults who have a keen and serious interest to perform music. Formerly known as the Philharmonic Chamber Orchestra Society (PCOS), the group became The Philharmonic Orchestra (TPO) to better reflect its intention to perform both symphonic and chamber works.

The Philharmonic Orchestra seeks to breathe new life into musical works and explore a repertoire that is very much neglected by big orchestras like SSO. The orchestra held its first concert in May 1998, performing Handel's Fireworks Music, Prokofiev's Classical Symphony and Mozart's Jupiter Symphony. For the 2007–2008 season, TPO has been engaged by Esplanade – Theatres on the Bay to undertake a year-long performance of all Jean Sibelius' Symphonies in a series of three concerts entitled Northern Exposure.

The Philharmonic Orchestra is also known for its commanding standard as a pit orchestra. It has received good reviews for its work as a pit orchestra when engaged by the Singapore Dance Theatre and Singapore Lyric Opera. Since then, it has stopped collaborating with the Singapore Lyric Opera, and focuses more on presenting its own concerts, the latest of which included two Haydn symphonies.

TPO currently does not rehearse at Old School anymore after management disputes between the two parties. In December 2001 and 2003, the orchestra was engaged by the National Arts Council as the accompanying orchestra for the concerto section at the National Music Competition.

== Past performances ==
=== Concerts ===
- Haydn's Symphony 'Bear' and 'Hunt' (2009)
- Beethoven's Symphony No. 9 "Choral" (2008)
- Sibelius's Symphonies No. 5, No. 6 & No. 7 (2008)
- Sibelius's Symphonies No. 4 & No. 2 (2008)
- Sibelius's Symphonies No. 3 & No. 1 (2007)
- Stravinsky's Pulcinella Suite (2007)
- Haydn's Farewell Symphony (2007)
- Mozart's Symphony No. 36 "Linz" (2007)
- Shostakovich's Symphony No. 7 "Leningrad" (2006)
- Mozart's Concerto No. 1 for Flute and Orch. (2006)
- Mozart's Concerto for Oboe and Orch. (2006)
- Mozart's Concerto for Clarinet and Orch. (2006)
- Schubert's Symphonies No. 3 and No. 5 (2005)
- Schubert's Symphonies No. 8 "Unfinished" and No. 9 "Great" (2005)
- Schumann's Symphonies No. 3 and No. 4 (2004)
- Schumann's Symphonies No. 1 and No. 2 (2004)
- Beethoven's Symphony No. 9 "Choral" (2003)
- Beethoven's Symphonies No. 2 and No. 7 (2003)
- Beethoven's Symphonies No. 4 and No. 8 (2003)
- Beethoven's Symphonies No. 1 and No. 6 "Pastoral" (2003)
- Beethoven's Symphonies No. 3 "Eroica" and No. 5 (2003)
- Vivaldi's Four Seasons (2002)
- Piazzolla's Four Seasons of Buenos Aires (2002)
- Brahms's Symphony No. 1 (2002)
- Mozart's Overture from Così fan tutte (2002)

(Missing History)

- Mozart's Symphony No. 41 (1998)
- Prokofiev's Symphony No. 1 (1998)

=== Dance engagements ===
- Tchaikovsky's The Nutcracker Ballet (2005)
- Tchaikovsky's The Sleeping Beauty Ballet (2004)
- Puccini's Madame Butterfly Ballet (2003)
- Mozart's Requiem (1999)
- Adolphe Adam's Giselle (1'999)

=== Opera engagements ===
- Puccinis Turandot (2008)
- Verdi's La traviata (2008, 1998)
- Rossini's The Barber of Seville (2007)
- Mozart's The Marriage of Figaro (2006)
- Puccini's Madame Butterfly (2005)
- Verdi's Macbeth (2001)
- Mascagni's Cavalleria Rusticana (2000)
- Leoncavallo's Pagliacci (2000)
- Romberg's The Student Prince (2000)
- Mozart's The Magic Flute (1999)
- Johann Strauss Jr.'s Die Fledermaus (1999)
- Bizet's Carmen (1998)

=== Concert engagements ===
- Simple Gifts: Christmas with Singapore Lyric Opera (2007)
- Filippa Giordano "Prima Donna" (2007)
- Viva Verdi (2007)
- Handel's Messiah (2006)
- Rossini's Stabat Mater (2006)
- J.S.Bach's Mass in B Minor (2006, 2000)
- Mosaic: Omara Portuondo (2005)
- Mosaic: k.d. lang in Concert (2005)
- Abigail Sin @ Esplanade (2004)
- Mendelssohn's St. Paul (2003)
- Richard Einhorn's Voices of Light (2003) - the music set to the 1928 silent film, Joan of Arc
- William So Concert (2003)
- Singapore Bible College 20th Anniversary Concert (2003)
- Christmas at Esplanade (2002)
- Beethoven's Missa Solemnis (2002)
- Mozart's Mass in C minor (2001)
- Mendelssohn's Hymn of Praise (2000)

=== Other engagements ===
- National Piano and Violin Competition (2003)
- National Piano and Violin Competition (2001)
