= The Observatory (band) =

Singaporean musical group

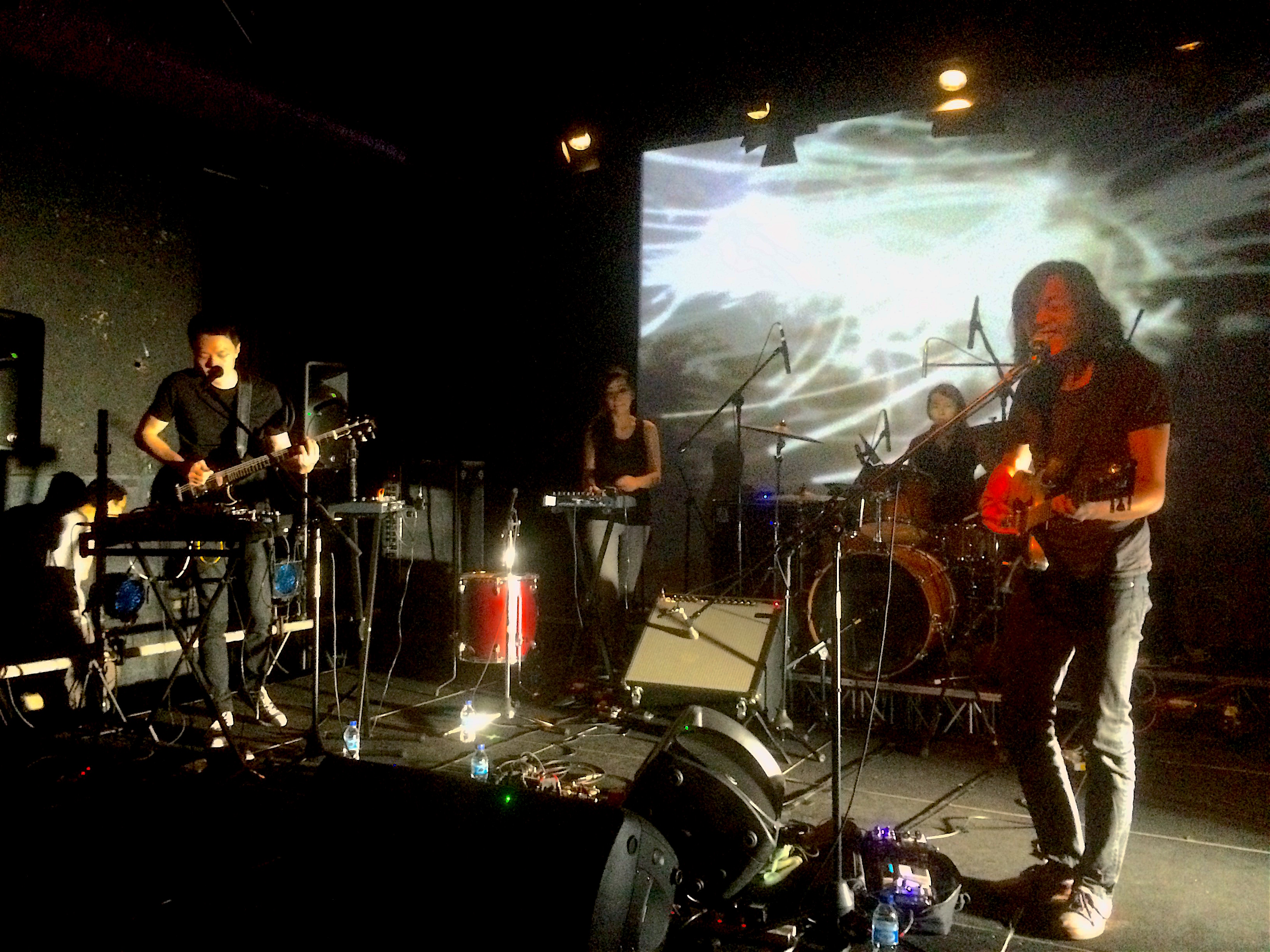
- The Observatory performing at The Substation, 2016: Yuen Chee Wai, Vivian Wang , Cheryl Ong, and Leslie Low

Background information
- Origin: Singapore
- Genres: Experimental rock, art rock, electronica, indie rock
- Years active: 2001–present
- Label: Independent
- Members: Dharma; Yuen Chee Wai; Cheryl Ong
- Past members: Evan Tan; Ray Aziz; Adam Shah; Victor Low; Bani Haykal; Vivian Wang; Leslie Low
- Website: theobservatory.com.sg

The Observatory is a rock band based in Singapore, primarily composed of musicians from 1990's Singaporean bands. The band formed in 2001 and performed for the first time at the 2002 Baybeats Music Festival.

The band has released eight studio albums since their formation: Time of Rebirth (2004), Blank Walls (2005), A Far Cry From Here (2007), Dark Folke (2009), Catacombs (2012), Oscilla (2014), Continuum (2015), and August is the Cruellest (2016). They have performed in Norway, Italy, Japan, France, Germany, and Singapore and in music events in Malaysia, Thailand, and South Korea, including the MTV Pattaya Music Festival, Heineken Fat Festival Bangkok, St Jerome's Laneway Festival, and the Seoul Fringe Festival.

The Observatory is the subject of The Obs: A Singapore Story, a crowd-funded, experimental music documentary. The film premiered at the Singapore International Film Festival in December 2014, and was later screened at the CINEDAYS Festival of European Film in Macedonia, the DORF Music Film Festival in Croatia, and the Bare Bones International Music and Film Festival in the United States.

== Musical style ==
Jason Birchmeier of AllMusic, described The Observatory as an "experimental rock group that draws influence from electronica, space rock, and progressive rock..."

Formed in 2001, the band’s early work was characterized by melodic structures and elements of art rock and post-rock. Over time, their music has incorporated darker tones, dissonance, and more abstract forms, drawing on influences from industrial, minimalism, and electroacoustic (electronic acoustic) traditions.

The Observatory has also collaborated with musicians known for their work in noise and improvisational music, including Otomo Yoshihide and Keiji Haino.

== Discography ==
=== Albums ===
==== Time of Rebirth ====
"Time of Rebirth" (2004) was The Observatory's debut album. Co-produced by Rennie Gomes, it was written and recorded over two and a half years. The recording took place at Yellow Box Studios and band members' homes in Singapore.

Early reception to the demo version was positive among select reviewers. Ivan Thomasz described it as "a timely way station on the journey of life", and Paul Zach praised the official album as being "so achingly, subtly gorgeous, it defies categorization". Despite not receiving airplay on local radio stations, 800 copies of the demo were sold. The full album was distributed by Universal Music Singapore, and sold out its initial pressing of 2,000 copies. Nominating Time of Rebirth as the Best Album of 2004, Razali Abdullah of Today called it "a groundbreaking album so ethereally beautiful...a local band as good as [The Observatory] comes by once a millennium". In The Straits Times, Yeow Kai Chai praised the album, writing, "The Observatory invoke otherworldly beauty through a blend of electric gadgetry and classic instrumentation…gradually laying bare their emotional core while taking your breath away", while Chris Ho praised Time of Rebirth for being "[t]ender and beautiful in its intimacy".

The album packaging was designed by Kinetic and included a replica diary created by the band members. A music video for "Killing Time" was directed by Royston Tan.

==== Blank Walls ====
The band’s second album, Blank Walls, was released in September 2005, produced by The Observatory and Jørgen Træen, and mixed by Træen at Duper Studio in Bergen, Norway.

Today gave the album a 4/5 rating, praising the band for "upping the ante by bringing in new drummer Adam Shah, who gives the band an unexpected edge, and crafting a beautiful opus that is hauntingly powerful" (Today, 2005). Yeow Kai Chai of The Straits Times highlighted how "the band’s audacity can be heard in the way sounds are spliced, unwound, and transplanted without warning." He remarked that "no other Singaporean band, past or present, has captured the imagination quite like The Observatory. In two brief years, this experimental space-rock combo has risen from nowhere to become a premier act spoken about with reverential hush."

The album features artwork by Andy Yang. The Observatory launched the album on the 2nd of September, 2005, with a sold-out concert at the Recital Studio of Esplanade – Theatres on the Bay. The band released a music video for the track "Olives," directed by Patrick Ong and Furious to promote the album.

==== A Far Cry From Here ====
Following Time of Rebirth and Blank Walls, A Far Cry From Here was released on the 15th of May, 2007 and was recorded by Jørgen Træen at Boss Studio in Singapore with Philip Wong. The record was produced by Træen and The Observatory as well as mixed and mastered by Træen at Duper Studio in Bergen, Norway.

The band's influences for the album included Soft Machine, This Heat, Tortoise, Talk Talk, Supersilent, Brian Wilson, Robert Wyatt, Nick Drake and Jaga Jazzist, for whom The Observatory opened at the Mosaic Music Festival in 2007. The band described the album as "a rich and imaginative musical vision, on which vocalist-guitarist Leslie Low builds his pensive, tender yet elliptical song-craft. The adventurous and epic blend seamlessly with restraint and intricacy. Exploring an ocean of sound and emotion, A Far Cry From Here should strike a chord with fans of experimental and progressive-minded classics such as Radiohead's OK Computer, Talk Talk's Spirit of Eden and Wilco's A Ghost Is Born." On Time of Rebirth and Blank Walls are the band front-man Leslie Low's built arrangements. However, the songs on A Far Cry From Here feature song idea contributions from each band member.

Reviewing the album for the Singapore edition of Time Out, Chris Toh wrote that A Far Cry From Here "delves even deeper into experimental melodies and rhythms than the band's previous critically acclaimed albums." The Today review noted how A Far Cry From Here "revels in a sense of unease and is the most obvious sign yet of the band's move away from its past 'ambient candy' sound." Yeow Kai Chai of The Straits Times praised The Observatory for "delving deep and venturing into the unknown...This sense of unease, a constant calibration between heaviness and lightness, informs how the music switches between jazzy delicacy and far-out phases of post-rock noiseniks. It's both the beauty and the beast... it's a ghostly, raw, sometimes intense soundscape with minimal overdubs to frighten off lazy lounge cats."

As with previous releases, the band chose non-standard packaging instead of the conventional jewel case. The outer package is a small flap box containing a foldout multi-panel slipcover with information and a CD holder in the last section. A Far Cry From Here was launched on 14 April 2007 at Zouk.

==== Dark Folke ====
The Observatory continued their longtime collaboration with Jørgen Træen on their fourth album, releasing the record Darke Folke in July 2009. The album was once again produced by Jørgen Træen and the band. Darke Folke was recorded, mixed, and mastered by Jørgen Træen at Duper Studio in Bergen, Norway.

The band describes the work as "a change in musical direction," noting that "the math prog rock of The Observatory's third album A Far Cry From Here has morphed into a fluid, mystical beast called Dark Folke. Most songs have no drums on them. But there is rhythm — only, the kind of rhythm that is tied to an invisible pulse. An implied rhythm. Five folks are sitting around a fire. A metaphorical fire. Chanting for the rain to come."

"Moving away from the melodious constraints of song," Ang Song Ming writes in his review, "Dark Folke veers towards ambiance – an almost asphyxiating kind," calling it the band's Kid A. Noah Berlatsky remarks in Metro Pulse on the album's combination of freak folk, drony psychedelia, and near-metal. Christopher Lim of The Business Times calls Dark Folke "A rich sonic feast.. a diving pool that begs to have its depths plumbed," while Chris Toh of Today awarded the album 4 out of 5, writing that "Album No. 4 for The Observatory is a great excursion into what making music in Scandinavia in the wintertime sounds like... the album is wonderfully hypnotic."

The CD album came with a hardbound book, designed and drawn by illustrator and designer Justin Bartlett. Dark Folke was also released on double vinyl. A music video for "Mind Roots," directed by Ler Jiyuan, was also released.

In the lead-up to Dark Folke's release, The Observatory collaborated with filmmaker Ho Tzu Nyen and theatre director Kok Heng Leun on Invisible Room, a multimedia work for the Singapore Arts Festival. It features the band performing in an 'inverted' music space. "Invisible Room" is also the title of a Dark Folke song.

==== Catacombs ====
The Observatory's fifth album, Catacombs, is described by the band as containing "a more primal, new dark wave sound...[a] study in delusion, insanity, and obsession [that] provokes and inspires in a deeply enigmatic way. Even at its coldest and most abstract, it is human to the core." Released in April 2012, the album was produced by Jørgen Træen and The Observatory, recorded. Mixed by Jorgen Traeen and mastered by James Plotkin. The album cover was designed by Keith Utech and the art was done by Thomas Hooper.

Writing that "The Observatory have outdone themselves this time," X' Ho reviewed Catacombs by declaring, "Someday in the future, some pop historian is gonna look back and say – Catacombs marks the beginning of a new horizon in local music for the sheer fact that waywardness in Singapore's ultra-leftfield, alternative-rock has been deemed fetching and unanimously praised with this album." Critic Kevin Mathews praised Catacombs by calling it "an uncompromising honest work of art that expresses the deepest feelings and emotions of the artist and lays them bare for its audience to dissect, absorb and devour." my Paper described Catacombs as "dark, visceral and multi-faceted," promising that it will "get under your skin – and stay there." Yeow Kai Chai of The Straits Times awarded the album four out of five stars, comparing it to the late Scott Walker and noting lyricist Leslie Low's references to Dutch occultist Johann Weyer and French philosopher Michel Foucault, writing that "the band have moved out of the mainstream into the furthest frontiers of the universe." Alia Azmi of Juice magazine noted that the album "explores a deeper, heavier sound than their previous works." In 2017, music website Bandwagon ranked Catacombs as the best The Observatory album, writing that "it stands as the band’s crowning achievement in framing primal emotions within intricate instrumentation...an incredible singular statement of artful intention and uninhibited honesty."

The album was designed by Keith Utech, and the artwork was created by Thomas Hooper. Catacombs was released on deluxe CD, digital, and double vinyl. The Observatory launched Catacombs on 20 and 21 April 2012 at The Substation Theatre. The band also released Enter the Catacomb, a series of live sessions featuring the band performing the entirety of Catacombs in the studio.

==== Oscilla ====
The Observatory’s sixth album, Oscilla, is described by the band as "the imagined swing of our imperfect times," featuring "vibrations of shifting rhythms, synth bass space, oscillators, and abused guitars." Released in August 2014, the album features Cheryl Ong on drums and percussion; Dharma on guitar; Leslie Low on guitar and vocals; Vivian Wang on synth bass, keys, and percussion; and Yuen Chee Wai on electronics and synth. Oscilla was produced by The Observatory and recorded live at The Black Axis in Singapore in May 2014. The record was engineered by Johnny Sarcophagus, mixed by Leslie Low, and mastered by James Plotkin. The album cover features a photograph by Phillip Aldrup from On the Blue Shores of Silence, with typography, layout, and additional photography by Yuen Chee Wai.

The Observatory developed Oscilla's four songs on tour with the Norwegian noise band MoE. The collaboration took place in Norway in 2012 and Italy in 2013. The groups then tested their songs on the road during a Southeast Asian tour in October and November 2013. The collaboration culminated in a divisive performance at St. Jerome's Laneway Festival in Singapore. The lyrics deal with political tumult. According to the band's lyricist Leslie Low, the lyrics reflect "[c]ommon people like us making a stand. Living off the grid in some way or another, (offering) criticism of existing paradigms, alternatives, the view from the ground up." The title track references Zomia, a term introduced by historians Willem van Schendel and James C. Scott. Zomia means the part of mainland Southeast Asia that has historically been beyond the control of governments based in the population centres of the lowlands.

As Kevin Mathews wrote in Today's album review, "Oscilla is cutting-edge art that one can conceivably rock out to, which is no mean feat," awarding it full marks. Yeow Kai Chai gave the album four out of five stars, writing in The Straits Times that Oscilla "scans the deplorable state of the world, questions war and strife, and assesses the value of life. To that end, its restless, angular riffs cut and draw blood." Daniel Peters of Bandwagon observed the "politically-charged" dimension of Oscilla, writing that the "elongated hypnotic rhythms akin to krautrock and a harsh post-punk intensity...establishes Oscilla as one of the most confrontational records we've heard all year."

Oscilla was released on CD, digital, vinyl, and cassette, while the album's artwork featured photographs by Philipp Aldrup. The Observatory launched Oscilla on 16 and 17 August 2014 at The Substation Theatre. The launch featured appearances by Hanging Up the Moon's Sean Lam, Dean Aziz, and former member Victor Low on backup vocals.

==== Continuum ====
Released on 15 July 2015, Continuum, The Observatory’s seventh album, was four years in the making. The record features Dharma on guitar and bass; Bani Haykal on guitar, reyong, and fencing; Vivian Wang on synth and vocals; and Leslie Low on acoustic guitar, bass, drums, voice, premade, jegogan, and reyong. The album was recorded and mixed by Leslie Low, and mastered by James Plotkin. The cover art was designed by Yuen Chee Wai, with illustrations by Massimiliano Amati (Redellearinghe).

The album is The Observatory's take on Indonesia's gamelan music tradition. Continuum was partially written and recorded in Lodtunduh, Bali. The Observatory devised their six-note scale of E, F, F#, A#, C, and D# on this album. Inspired in part by Talk Talk and Jiddu Krishnamurti, the noise musician Lasse Marhaug contributed a remix, "Part 6", to Continuum's release. Released on double vinyl, CD and digitally, The Observatory launched Continuum at The Substation on 23 July 2015. The launch concert featured an ensemble of 10 musicians. The Straits Times found "the East-meets-West soundscape...hypnotic in the way it tightly enveloped the audience" at the "seamless art-rock concert[s]." The National Arts Council's Arts Creation Fund partially funded Continuum.

The Straits Times found Continuum a "sonically stellar mix" and "tenebrous but at the same time, musically cutting-edge and far-out," giving it four out of five stars. Time Out Singapore ranked Continuum amongst the best albums of 2015, noting that while the album is "not their best release by a long shot... this EP of gamelan music spiked with noise and doom rock deserves mad props for its bravery." Bandwagon ranked it #7 on its Top 10 Singapore LPs of 2015.

In February 2016, the band performed Continuum at the Performing Arts Meeting in Yokohama, Japan. Aki Onda directed the performance as part of a program curated by Tang Fu Kuen. The National Arts Council supported the one-night performance.

==== August is the Cruellest ====
Recorded in Singapore and Norway during the height of the 2015 Southeast Asian haze crisis, August is the Cruellest, inspired by King Crimson, Soft Machine, Zircon Lounge and others, is described by the band as "a work of political noise, a punishing challenge to look inward and move forward." The album was released on 29 February 2016 and was recorded and mixed by Leslie Low and mastered by James Plotkin. Almost the entire album was recorded at Solslottet Studios, Bergen, Norway, except for two songs. The tracks "August is the Cruellest" as well as "Brutal Blues" were recorded at Black Axis & The Well, Singapore. The music on the album was composed, performed, and arranged by The Observatory with additional instrumentation on "The Weight of It All" featuring Natalie Alexandra Tse on guzheng and Andy Chia on dizi. The cover was designed by Yuen Chee Wai and contains photographs by Bjorn Vaughn.

The title track for the album, inspired by T. S. Eliot's poem "The Waste Land," was previously performed live at theatre company Drama Box's Singapore International Festival of Arts 2015 production The Cemetery. Writer Ng Yi-Sheng described the song as "growling rock, loud as bulldozers," another critic called it "a searing rock track... raw and loud, melancholic and frustrated, and ends with high-pitched feedback," while TODAY's Mayo Martin noted that "the music evokes anger, frustration, despair and destruction — but perhaps also the slightest trace of hope."

Reviewing the album on Bandwagon, three critics described it as "proper follow-up to Oscilla," "challenging and disconcerting", and "sinister, raw and explosive." They noted the production, especially the drums, "sounds great." "Designed to grip you and shock you out of apathy and just make you think––that's the sense of hope," they noted, singling out "Everything is Vibration" and "The Weight of It All" as highlights of "their strongest album yet," giving it ratings of 8/10, 7/10 and 8.5/10. In a review of their album launch gig, Bandwagon also noted that the album "doesn't just see them at their most sonically intrusive — they're pissed off." Time Out Singapore's editor Iliyas Ong called August is the Cruellest a "seething, fire-breathing monster," declaring it 'a soundtrack for our times." "The Observatory's – and possibly the local scene's – tightest and most mature effort to date." Interviewing the band in TODAY, Kevin Mathews called August is the Cruellest a "multi-layered work," while he declared it "their most accessible of their recent releases" and "progressive rock with a conscience" that "succeeds at every level" on his blog.

The Straits Times' music correspondent Eddino Abdul Hadi gave the album 4/5, noting how it is "full of heartfelt anthems" and features "some of their most visceral and strident anthems to date." Eddino highlighted the songs "You Have No Heart" and "Wait For The Real Storm" as stand-outs, comparing "Low's layered harmonies" on the former to his Humpback Oak tunes. Jun Sheng Ng of Juice magazine described August is the Cruellest as an "immediate counterpoint to the prevailing spirit and sentiment widespread through the city" soon after Singapore's golden jubilee celebrations, noting that it "paints a landscape of desolation [and] the infertile and impotent wasteland we are mired in." Observing that the songs "Everything is Vibration" and "The Weight of It All" reflect the "group’s effort to return to or construct a Southeast Asian or Singaporean sound," with their quotes from Yan Jun’s poetry and use of traditional Chinese instruments like the guzheng and dizi, Ng criticised how "they are unavoidably dwarfed by the already heavy weight and influence of Eliot’s." Honeycombers praised August is the Cruellest as an "audial commentary on the looming, cataclysmic destruction of the earth" and a "revolutionary record [that] challenges a negative status quo that many have refused to acknowledge."

Released on CD, cassette, double vinyl, and digitally, August is the Cruellest was launched at the band's acclaimed The Substation gigs on 18 and 19 March 2016, with special guests Dharma and SA Trio and featuring covers of The Cure and Talking Heads. On 9 March 2016, a black-and-white music video for the album closer "The Weight of It All" was released.

=== Compilations ===
==== City Sharks: Music From the Motion Picture ====
- Released: 2003
- Executive Producers: Esan Sivalingam and Bratina Tay
- Music Supervisors: Vivian Wang and Esan Sivalingam

An early incarnation of The Observatory contributed two songs, "Sweetest Man" and "Coffee Break (Intermission) to City Sharks' soundtrack. Esan Sivalingam wrote and directed the songs.

- Released: 2006
- Mastered by Reece Tunbridge at Studios 301, Sydney, Australia

This charity release included Rennie Gomes' remix of "This Sad Song" from The Observatory's debut album, Time of Rebirth. Proceeds from this Aging Youth Records release went to Music For Good, a non-profit organization involved in outreach programs to youths.

==== +65 Indie Underground ====
- Released: 2009

The Observatory's "This Sad Song" from their debut album, Time of Rebirth, was collected in this three-CD compilation of Singapore indie rock. The song is featured alongside tracks by Humpback Oak, The Oddfellows and Zircon Lounge.

==== Peter Kruder Private Collection ====
- Released: 2009

The Observatory's "Waste Your Life" from their debut album, Time of Rebirth, was handpicked by Peter Kruder of electronic duo Kruder & Dorfmeister for G-Stone Master Series №1: Peter Kruder Private Collection. Other acts on the compilation include Talk Talk, Tortoise, whom The Observatory opened up for at the Mosaic Music Festival in 2005, and Tom Waits.

==== Anatomicron ====
- Released: September 2012

Anatomicron is a collection of unreleased and live material, demos, covers, and rarities. Its 13 tracks include a Nick Drake cover. The release traces The Observatory's evolution through constantly changing trajectories and terrains. Anatomicron's release supported the crowd-funded, experimental music documentary The Obs: A Singapore Story.

==== Behind These Eyes: The Catacombs Remixes ====
- Released: April 2014
- Jointly released by The Observatory and Ujikaji

Featuring 11 interpretations of Catacombs songs by artists from Singapore, China, Norway, Thailand/Japan, and the US, including James Plotkin, Lasse Marhaug, and Xhin. Interviewed about Behind These Eyes: The Catacombs Remixes, singer Low called the album "Eleven musical visions-lessons-perspectives. The interpretations elaborate on Catacombs' theme of madness and reach sonic territories we could never achieve on our own."

The album was reviewed positively on Midnight Shift Records' blog: "As these artists take The Observatory’s songs further into a digital register, what seemed like a highly personal album dilates into something like a genre unto itself." Reviewing the album in The Straits Times, Yeow Kai Chai wrote that Behind These Eyes: The Catacombs Remixes "meddles with the songs to spectacular effect...Overall, it's a rabbit hole to somewhere riskier and more exciting," while Bandwagon called it "stunning."

Featuring art by Mark Wong, Behind These Eyes: The Catacombs Remixes was released on double vinyl. The album was launched on 25 April 2014 at Artistry. The launch featured performances and DJ sets by Kiat, Xhin, George Chua and former member Evan Tan.

=== Split Albums and Collaborations ===
==== Gezeitentümpel | Tidal Pools ====
- Released: 2013

An hour-long improvisational soundtrack to photographer Philipp Aldup's 2013 exhibition, Gezeitentümpel, released as a seven-track CD-R.

==== i.i.i. / Mankind ====
- Released: June, 2013
- Mixing by Leslie Low and Håvard Skaset
- Mastering by James Plotkin
- Design and album art by Lasse Marhaug

This split vinyl single with Norway's MoE features Balinese gamelan-inspired bronze instruments the band built on their song, "Mankind". Other instruments on the track include a pair of jegogan and premade, one fencing, and a reyong set with acoustic guitar, electric guitar, bass, drums, and vocals. "Mankind" was later released on Continuum.

==== Shadows ====
- Released: 1 July, 2018
- Produced by The Observatory and MoE
- Co-produced by Lasse Marhaug
- Mixed and mastered by Lasse Marhaug
- Art direction and layout by Yuen Chee Wai

Recorded in Singapore and Norway, Shadows is a three-track collaborative album with MoE. On the album, both bands experiment with heavy noise rock, gamelan, and konnakol. The nearly 20-minute release alludes to the need for self-examination, wayang kulit, instincts, and illusions.

==== Trails to the Cosmic Vibrations ====
- Released: 22 November, 2018
- Mixed by Kawabata Makoto and Leslie Low
- Mastering by James Plotkin
- Artwork by Takahiro Kurashima
- Art direction and layout by Yuen Chee Wai

A split vinyl single with Acid Mothers Temple & The Melting Paraiso U.F.O. Acid Mothers Temple's 20-minute contribution, "Flatwoods Monster A Go Go ~ Cometary Orbital Drive 00∞00." The release was a Hawkwind tribute, performed on their 2017 and 2018 tour. The Observatory recorded "Vibrational" at their concert at the National University of Singapore (NUS) Arts Festival 2017. The performance featured an orchestra of 30 guitarists from the NUS Guitar Ensemble and the university. Trails to the Cosmic Vibrations was launched with Acid Mothers Temple & The Melting Paraiso U.F.O.'s concert in Singapore on 22 November 2018.

==== Authority is Alive ====
- Released: 30 September 2020
- Mixed and mastered by Lasse Marhaug
- Cover photography by Darren Soh
- Art direction by Yuen Chee Wai

Authority is Alive is a live collaboration with the Japanese avant-garde musician Haino Keiji. The collaboration was recorded live at "The Transparency of Turbulence" Playfreely Festival, 29 November 2019, at 72-13 (Singapore). In a four-star review, NME writer Azzief Khaliq says, "Over the album’s 22 minutes, The Observatory and Keiji Haino create improvised music that showcases what talented musicians can achieve in such a setting. It’s an example of steely-eyed energy and musical alchemy, four musicians pushing each other forward and taking everything that comes out of it in their stride. The results are intoxicating, gripping, and more than a bit exhilarating."

== Band members ==
=== Current members ===
- Dharma – Electric Guitar

Dharma's involvement in the Singapore underground music scene began in the early 1990s. He performed as a bassist and sometimes guitarist with Manic Mushroom, a guitarist with Heritage from 1995–1998, a front-man of the local funk band Throb and a member of Meddle, Chöd, and Tenggara Trio.

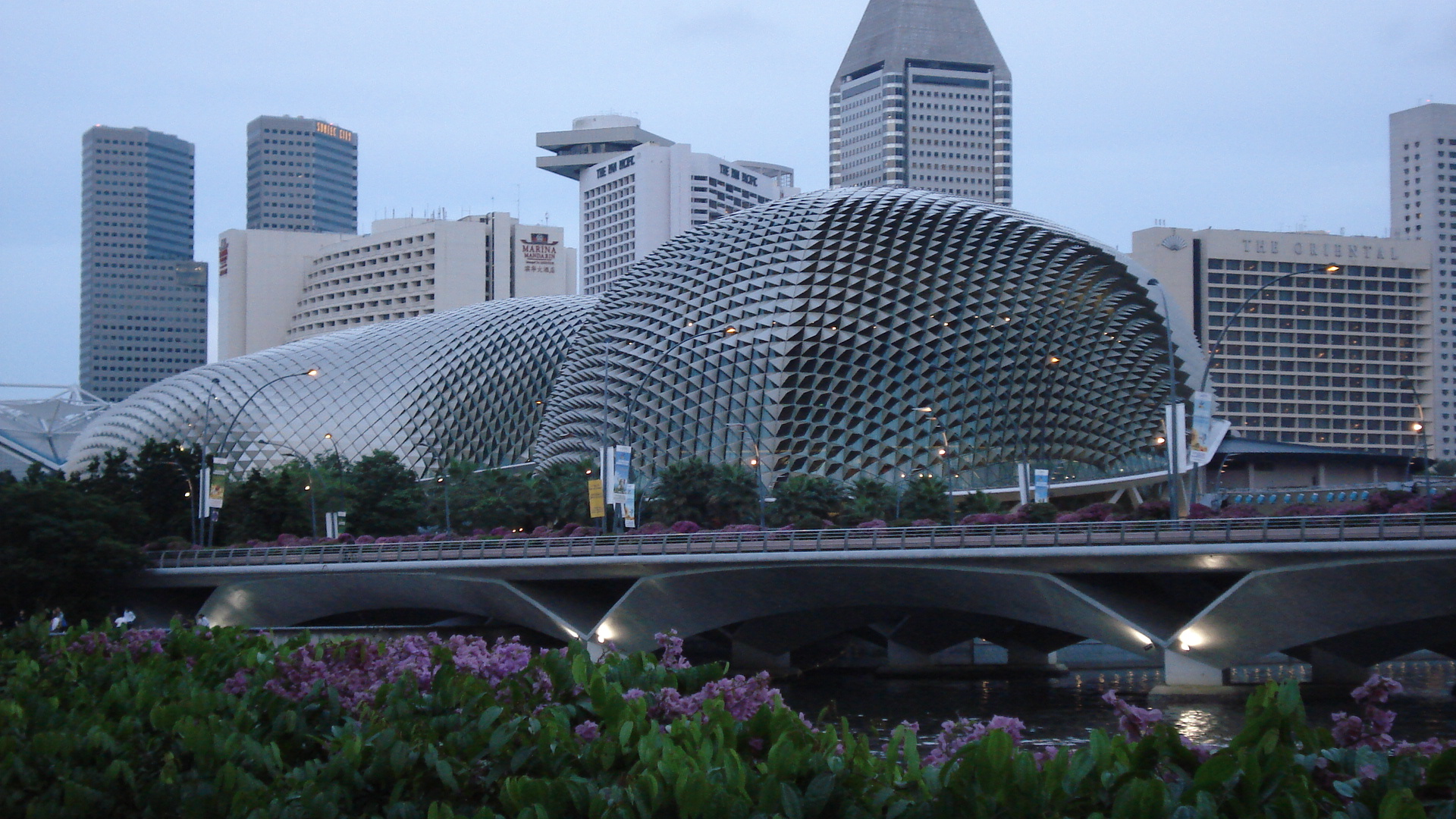
The Observatory has appeared at multiple music fests within Singapore, including several times at the Esplanade (at center)

- Yuen Chee Wai – Guitar, Synth, Electronics

Yuen Chee Wai has been active in the local and international experimental and improv circuit for the past two decades. He is also a part of the Far East Network (FEN) – a quartet comprising Otomo Yoshihide (Japan), Yan Jun (China), and Ryu Hankil (South Korea) since 2008. In 2015, he was appointed Director of the Asian Music Network in Japan, which organizes the annual Asian Meeting Festival, of which he is co-curator.

- Cheryl Ong – Drums, Percussion, Electronics

Cheryl Ong is a Singaporean percussionist. She is active in music performance and education. In addition to performing with The Observatory, she has played with SA, a trio fusing traditional Chinese instruments and electronics.

=== Former members ===
Leslie Low – Lead Vocals, Electric + Acoustic Guitars, Programming, Bass, Harmonica, Percussion

Former frontman of veteran local band Humpback Oak, Low was the singer, guitarist, and occasional bassist in the band. He is a music composer and sound designer. Low graduated from the School of Film and Media Studies at Ngee Ann Polytechnic with a Diploma in Film, Sound and Video. He has been involved in several side projects. As PAN GU, Low's collaboration with Lasse Marhaug (electronics), he created Primeval Man Born of the Cosmic Egg. He left The Observatory after the band released their eighth album, August is the cruellest, in 2016. He has since released multiple, mostly solo albums digitally through Bandcamp.

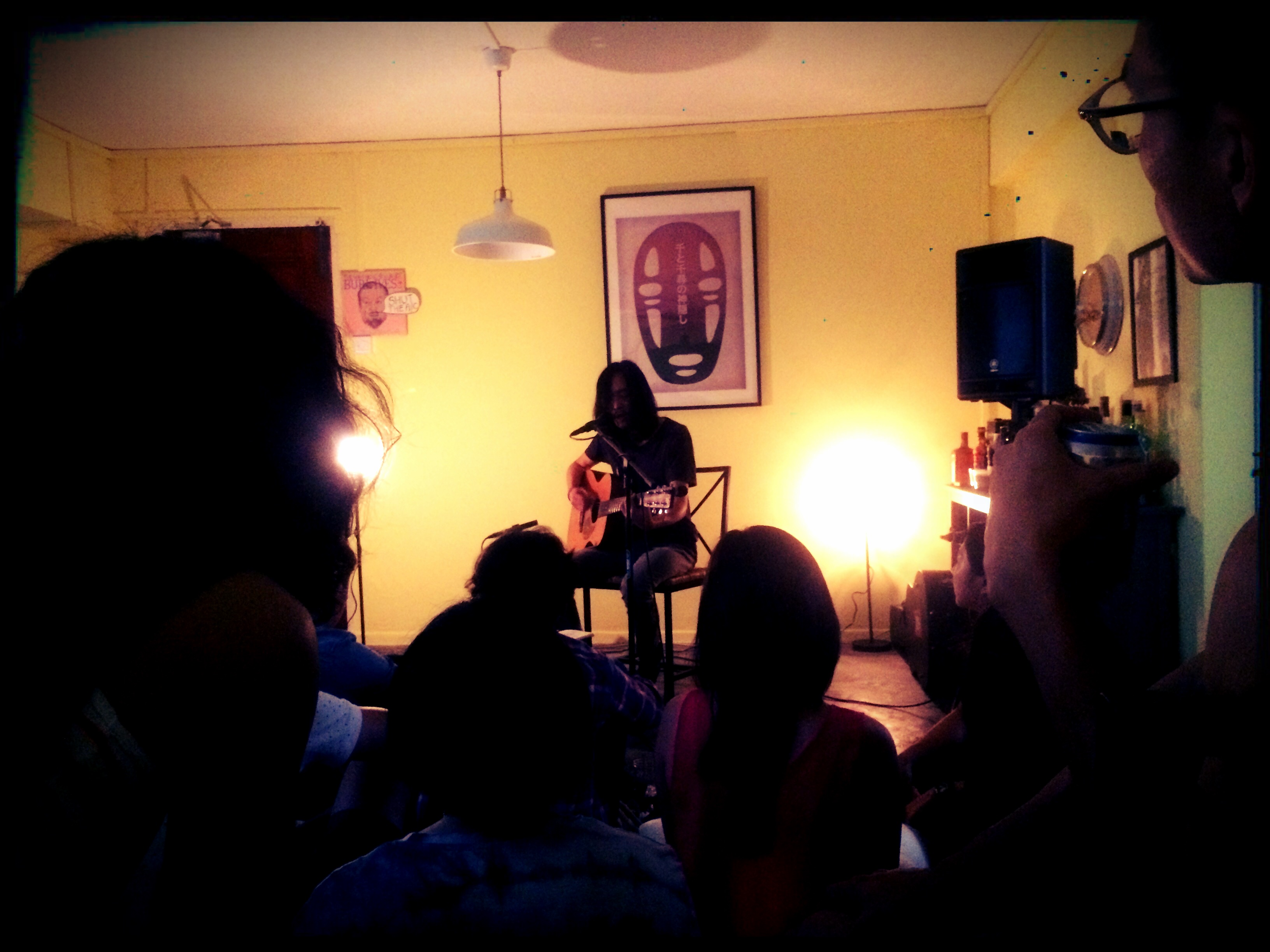
Leslie Low performing in 2014

Vivian Wang – Vocals, Piano, keyboards, Melodica, Percussion

A classically trained pianist, Vivian Wang sang, played keyboards, and generated sonic effects on laptops and synthesizers in The Observatory. Wang is a former TV presenter of the arts programme "Artitude" on local channel TV12 and also a host of Cathay Pacific's inflight series "World of Travel." A music supervisor and film producer by profession, Wang graduated with an Honours in Music. Wang is active in ARCN TEMPL, a duo with Low. Their debut Emanations of a New World (May 2010) and a web-only commemorative release Glass Blood (May 2014), were released by American label Utech Records. Wang left the band after the release of August is the Cruellest and has since worked on projects including Jenny Hval's The Practice of Love album.

Bani Haykal – Drums, Percussion, Clarinet

Born in 1985, Bani Haykal is a multidisciplinary artist combining literary, visual, and music performance. According to the Thailand Biennial Phuket 2025, "His projects examine the perceptions, relevancy, and cultures of sound and music, often materialising through collaborations with artists from a wide range of creative fields, as a means to discover new audio-visual forms." In 2013, Bani was awarded the Young Artist Award by Singapore's National Arts Council. Bani joined the band after the release of Catacombs and left before Oscilla, but contributed to Continuum.

Victor Low – Electric Guitar, Classical Guitar, Bass Guitar, Glockenspiel, Percussion

Victor Low is a professional music composer. He is an Economics graduate of Boston University. Low is the former bassist of veteran local Singapore band Concave Scream. A classical guitar specialist, Low also performed on drums after Ray Aziz left the band. Low left the band after the release of Catacombs. In 2015, he recorded an instrumental album Songs of the Well inspired by his daughter's piano lessons. In 2019, Victor and former bandmate Leslie Low released The Monsoon.

Evan Tan – Programming, Keyboards, Melodica, Percussion

Evan Tan is a one-time archivist specializing in audio-visual restoration at the National Archives of Singapore. Tan toured overseas with former band The Padres during their album promotion organized by Rock Records. An active performer/programmer in the digital music scene, he released a solo album Coast to Coast previously. Tan left the band after the release of Dark Folke.

Ray Aziz – Drums, Percussion

Ray Aziz is a veteran drummer in Singapore. His former bands include Swirling Madness, Opposition Party, Sugarflies and Popland. He was concurrently also playing with Throb and The Blues Machine. Joining The Observatory during the A Far Cry From Here recording sessions, Ray contributed jazz/avant rock-styled drumming. He did not appear on Dark Folke and has since left the band. However, in 2011 he played drums for the band in a performance commissioned by the Singapore Arts Festival, to play a concert pull of reworkings of the Beatles' White Album.

Adam Shah – drums, percussion

Formerly the youngest member of the group, Adam Shah has been a sessionist since he was 15. He plays guitar and bass as well. He joined in January 2005 at 17 years of age, after successfully auditioning for the position, bringing with him a style that reflects his eclectic influences such as Bloc Party, Radiohead, Broken Social Scene, Lamb of God, Mastodon, John Coltrane, John Butler, The Mars Volta and Pat Metheny, to name a few. Adam left the band after the release of Blank Walls and before A Far Cry From Here.
