= Ujikaji =

Singapore independent record label

- Founded: 2010
- Status: Active
- Genre: Electronic; experimental; ambient; free jazz
- Country of origin: Singapore
- Official website: ujikaji.bandcamp.com

Ujikaji is an independent record label and event organiser in Singapore.

== Background ==
Ujikaji means "experiment" in Malay, and the label's interests lie in the curation of experimental music, with a special focus on Southeast Asian artists and sounds. The label supports independent artists with platforms to perform their music, as well as in producing and releasing their music, and establishing a complementary partnership that allows them to focus on the creative aspects of music-making. Ujikaji has released works by Magus (Leslie Low and Mark Dolmont), Dream State Vision (Shaun Sankaran), Awk Wah (Shark Fung), The Observatory, Pan Gu (Leslie Low and Lasse Marhaug), Tim O'Dwyer, PUPA, Yuen Chee Wai, Yan Jun and FEN.

Having established a semi-regular night of experimental and improvised music at now-defunct cafe and bar, Artistry, Ujikaji currently co-presents, with The Observatory, the BlackKaji series of performances at Black Axis. According to musicians NADA: "What Ujikaji does is Singapore’s answer to the spirit and curation found in places like John Zorn’s The Stone on the Lower East Side in New York City or Café OTO in east London." Along with fellow veteran independent Singapore label KITCHEN. LABEL, Ujikaji was cited as having "done a lot for the experimental scene in Singapore" and paving the way for newer experimental labels like Evening Chants to emerge.

== Artists ==
- Acid Mothers Temple & the Melting Paraiso U.F.O.
- Awk Wah
- Dream State Vision
- FEN
- George Chua
- Haino Keiji
- Lasse Marhaug
- Magus
- Marco Fusinato
- The Observatory
- Pan Gu
- PUPA
- Tim O'Dwyer
- Yan Jun
- Yuen Chee Wai

== Discography ==
Catalogue No.	Artist	Album	Release date
UJI-001	Magus	Sun Worshipper	2011
UJI-002	Dream State Vision	Dream State Vision	2011
UJI-003LP	Awk Wah	Ava	2013
UJI-004LP	Marco Fusinato	Spectral Arrows: Singapore	2017
UJI-005LP	The Observatory	Behind These Eyes: The Catacombs Remixes	2014
UJI-006CS	Pan Gu	The People are Panthers	2015
UJI-007CD	Tim O'Dwyer	Hysteresis	2015
UJI-010LP	Yuen Chee Wai & Lasse Marhaug	In Praise of Shadows	2018
UJI-011CD	Yan Jun & Yuen Chee Wai	Crows that have no eyes	2017
UJI-012CS	PUPA	Lies	2018
UJI-013LP	George Chua	Smokescreen	2020
UJI-014LP	Acid Mothers Temple & the Melting Paraiso U.F.O. / The Observatory	Trails To The Cosmic Vibrations	2018
UJI-015CD	Stevphen Shukaitis, Penny Rimbaud, Dharma and Awk Wah	Entry Points. Resonating Punk, Performance, and Art	2019
UJI-016LP	FEN	Imagined Commonities: Live At La Cave 12, Genève	2019
UJI-017LP	Haino Keiji & The Observatory	Authority is Alive	2020

== See also ==
- List of record labels
