= Tim Nolan (musician) =

British-born bassist living in Singapore (born 1960)

Tim Nolan (born 1960) is a British-born bassist living in Singapore.

== Early life ==
Nolan was born in Oldham, Lancashire, United Kingdom in 1960. In the early 1980s he played with Nottingham-based jazz band Pinski Zoo, recording the album Introduce me to the Doctor, which garnered the review from NME of "Pinski Zoo have put the animal back into music," and which included the track "Stutter Strut". Other albums featuring Nolan included The Dizzy Dance Record and The City Can't Have It Back. During this time the band gained popularity, with features in music papers such as the NME and Melody Maker, and by playing and touring with such bands as The Eurythmics, Pigbag, and Alexis Korner. After leaving Pinski Zoo, Nolan played with The Howdy Boys, also based in Nottingham.

== Popland ==
From 1998 to 2006, he was in the Singapore band Popland with Kevin Mathews, where they produced 3 CDs, the first being Pop, released in 1997 under the name The Crowd (which they later changed to avoid confusion with a U.S. band of the same name). They followed this with 1998's Groovy, featuring well-known Singaporean musician Ray Aziz on drums. Aziz appeared live with the band, delivering inventive and powerful rhythms to complement the power-pop of Mathews's and Nolan's songs. He also played drums on their 2002 release Action, released on Zip Records. Since then they have been profiled by Singapore's national newspaper, The Straits Times, have played on several Singapore TV shows, been heard worldwide on various radio stations and their music was used in The WB TV show High School Reunion. The band split in 2006.
