= Humpback Oak =

Singaporean rock band

- Origin: Singapore
- Genre: indie rock folk rock
- Years active: 1990–2001
- Members: Leslie Low; Vincent Chin; Daniel Wee; Stanley Teo

Humpback Oak was a Singaporean band formed in 1990-1991 that achieved popularity in 1994 with the release of their debut album Pain-Stained Morning. Featuring the standout tracks "Fear", "Finer Life", "Circling Square" and "Lower Girl", the album garnered considerable attention and popularity in South-East Asia, and they won both Favourite Local Act and Critic's Choice awards in Singapore's Perfect 10 Music Awards in 1995.

Humpback Oak was considered part of the explosion of bands in the late 1980s and early 1990s such as The Oddfellows, The Padres, Concave Scream, Livonia and Stompin' Ground that brought the Singapore local indie and alternative music scene to the forefront, and were the subject of subsequent discussion in the Singapore media, articles and books regarding the English music scene revival. In 1997, the band returned with Ghostfather, a more introspective, melancholy album. A third album SideASideB followed in 1999, and a few years after, the band faded from view.

The band recently returned and released a limited-edition compilation boxset called Oaksongs on 27 Feb 2010. The box set contained the band's three studio albums and previously unreleased rarities.

== History ==
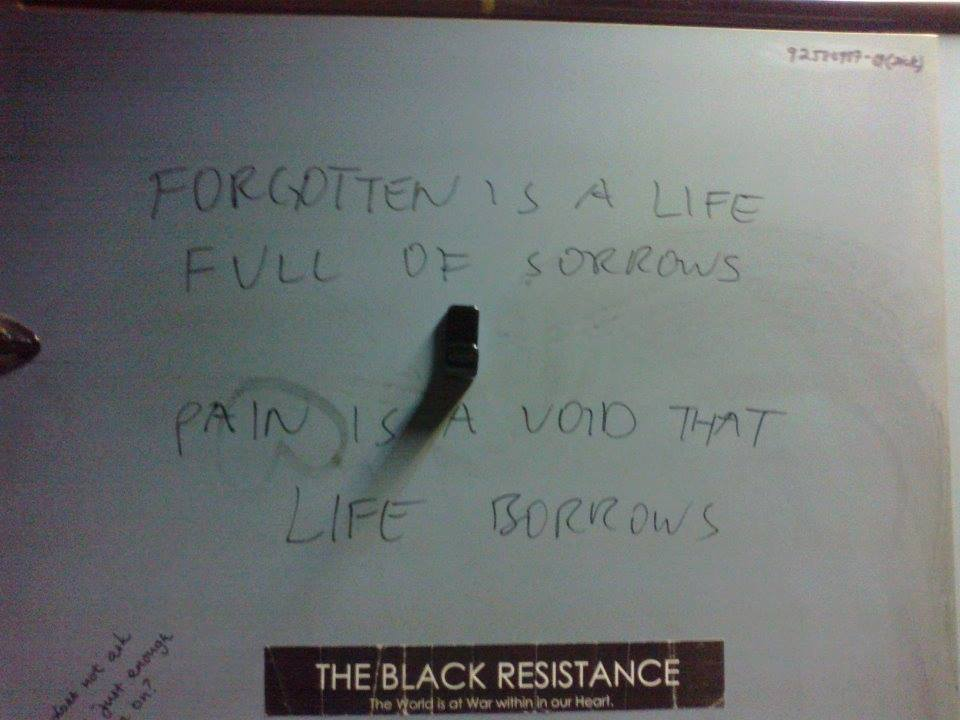
Graffiti of Humpback Oak Lyrics from "Pain" off Pain-stained Morning at The Substation, Singapore, 2012

The band members knew one another in St Joseph Institution and started playing together around 1988–89, and decided the final lineup around 1990–91. They subsequently started composing original music and released demo cassettes sold at local record stores.

The band remained musically active throughout the 1990s with two more albums, Ghostfather (1997) and SideASideB (1999), before moving on to other pursuits. The band recently got together for a one-evening performance at the Rock for Wayne tribute concert on June 23rd, 2007, and recently released a limited-edition compilation boxset called Oaksongs on February 27th, 2010. On August 10th, 2025, their three studio albums, as well as a compilation of demos, were finally released to streaming services.

== Members ==
- Leslie Low (vocals and guitars) - former frontman of The Observatory
- Vincent Chin (guitars)
- Daniel Wee (bass)
- Stanley Teo (drums)

== Discography ==
- Pain-Stained Morning (1994)
- Ghostfather (1997)
- SideASideB (1999)
- Oaksongs Compilation Box Set (2010)
