= Zircon Lounge =

- Origin: Singapore
- Genres: New wave, punk rock, art rock
- Years active: 1980–1988
- Members: Tan Tiang Yeow; Ronnie Chung Shih Loong; Ernie Woo Huay Pin
- Past members: Chris Ho; Farihin Fattah; Song Kee Hiang; Chee Kee Chien; Abdul Razak bin Mamat; Nasir bin Abdul Rashid

Zircon Lounge was a Singaporean band formed in the early 1980s that achieved popularity with the release of their influential debut album, Regal Vigor (1983). The pioneering new wave band broke up in 1988.

Despite their short lifespan, Zircon Lounge is credited with sparking off the Singapore alternative music scene.

== History ==
Zircon Lounge formed from Damien Sin's Transformer, a garage rock band that disc jockey and music critic Chris Ho was a part of beginning in 1979. Transformer disbanded in 1982 and Zircon Lounge was formed shortly after with Ho on lead vocals, Tan Tiang Yeow on lead guitars, Ernie Woo Huay Pin on bass, and Ronnie Chung Shih Loong on drums. The band was named after a lyric in the song "The Have-Nots" by American band X.

Initially, the band performed covers of Patti Smith and Lou Reed songs, before progressing to original songs. Influenced by American new wave music, Iggy Pop, Jean Genet and Alan Vega, Zircon Lounge was inspired to shake up the Singaporean music scene, which in the 1980s mostly consisted of cover bands. As Ho told Philip Cheah of the Singapore Monitor in 1983: "[W]e are a band which believes in principles, and rock 'n' roll has got to do with what's new. It's got to do with change. So we've got to move and chart new directions. Everyone wants to play safe. No one wants to do anything about music because the feeling is – 'Ah, it's too difficult'. That's what making Regal Vigour means to us – not playing safe."

Regal Vigor, the band's debut album, was released by Warner Music Singapore (WEA) in late 1983. Consisting of three covers—Romeo Void's "Myself to Myself" and two of the Velvet Underground's "Sweet Jane"—and seven original songs, Regal Vigor was co-produced by Dick Lee, and featured guest spots from Anita Sarawak, Jacintha Abisheganaden and Broery Marantika. Two songs, "Savior" and the Thai-influenced "Chanachai", were released as singles.

Upon its release, Regal Vigor was heralded by The Straits Times' Richard Lim as "the boldest venture ever in the history of local recording", and Zircon Lounge as "the only local band who's got a firm grasp of what rock 'n' roll is all about". Zircon Lounge was also billed as "Singapore's Most Exciting Group", and their live shows were compared to the Velvet Underground's and called "the first time [in Singapore] that a band has gone out of its way to challenge the audience".

To promote the album, Zircon Lounge played a one-week stint at The Rainbow on Cuscaden Road, alongside American funk band New Joy and Australian group Cut Glass. Their live repertoire included covers of Joy Division's "Transmission" and Lou Reed's "Street Hassle".

In May 1984, Zircon Lounge was dropped by their label as Regal Vigor had only sold about 1,000 copies. In comparison, a Tracy Huang album sold an average of 50,000 copies.

Despite not having a recording contract, Zircon Lounge played another one-week stint at The Rainbow in August 1984. In the same month, it was reported that the band had written 20 new songs using David Bowie's cut-up technique, and that lead guitarist Tan would soon return to England for his final year of studies.

In June 1985, Zircon Lounge contributed two tracks, "Guide These Hands" and "Lonely When Away From My Love", to the WEA Records album Class Acts. The album was a hit, selling more than 20,000 copies in Singapore.

In March 1986, Zircon Lounge played the "Let's Rock" concert at the National Stadium with new members Chee Kee Chien (second guitar), Abdul Razak bin Mamat (drums) and Nasir bin Abdul Rashid (bass). They performed three new songs, a cover of Tokyo Square's hit "Within You'll Remain" and new numbers "Cold in Buriram" and funk shuffle "Nights on the CTE".

In August 1986, the band contributed two tracks to WEA Records' Class Acts Two, the Thai-influenced "Vaneepok" and "Cold in Buriram", which was compared to The Doors and called "the best song on the album". "Cold in Buriram" hit a peak of No. 3 on the charts.

In May 1987, Zircon Lounge was captured live along with bands like Opposition Party on the cassette No Surrender – Live at Anywhere, released by BigO. In the same year, the band contributed the song "Cold in Buriram" to the compilation Made in Singapore. Later in the year, Zircon Lounge played its last gig at the National University of Singapore's Yin & Yang Festival. The band parted ways shortly after.

In 2003, Ho reunited with lead guitarist Tan Tiang Yeow to form Zircon Gov. Pawn Starz, an electroclash project fronted by singer Sue-Sue Law, the alter-ego of DJ Suzanne Walker. Zircon Gov. Pawn Starz released their debut album, Follywood, in 2004.

In 2009, Zircon Lounge's 1984 track "Guide These Hands" was included in +65 Underground, a retrospective anthology of indie/underground rock in Singapore.

In July 2013, producer Fauxe released a remix of Zircon Lounge's "Strangers". Later in the year, Ho announced on his website that Zircon Lounge's Regal Vigor album would be re-mastered for a re-issue in late 2013 with bonus tracks, with a new version of "Cold in Buriram" to be produced by Kiat of Syndicate. He also stated that original members of the band have reformed under the moniker Zirconia and are working on a new EP with guitarist Randolf Arriola. As of 2019, however, these plans have yet to materialise.

== Members ==
- Chris Ho (vocals)

X' Ho was the musician/author/underground filmmaker who was better accepted in Singapore as Chris Ho, the radio DJ. During his lifetime he wrote three books about Singapore, made six short films and recorded numerous CDs including Lucifugous (2013), a collaboration with ARCN TEMPL who are Leslie Low & Vivian Wang of The Observatory. His 2009 album No Ordinary Country, the first 'protest folk' album from Singapore, received this praise from The Business Times: "(It) should be required listening for anyone interested in plugging into a part of Singapore's zeitgeist that too often lies simmering below the surface." In 1987, Ho was named Most Outstanding Asia-Pacific Radio Personality by the Australasian Broadcasting Arts & Sciences. Ho was latterly a DJ on Lush 99.5FM. He died from stomach cancer on 27 September 2021.

- Tan Tiang Yeow (guitars)

Singer-songwriter Yeow's music career spans 20 years: from his debut album with home-bred, prodigy rock-group Zircon Lounge at the age of 18, to his first solo release, What I Require in 1994. In 2003, he released his second solo album This Generation. He has a BFA in Commercial Design from Parsons School of Art, used to front the underground band Vida Loca, and runs his own graphic design company, Design Studio.

- Ronnie Chung Shih Loong (drums)
- Ernie Woo Huay Pin (bass)
- Farihin Fattah (saxophone)
- Song Kee Hiang (synths and keyboards)
- Chee Kee Chien (second guitar)
- Abdul Razak bin Mamat (drums)
- Nasir bin Abdul Rashid (bass)

== Discography ==
- Regal Vigor (1983)

A1. Shivers, Shivers

A2. Myself To Myself

A3. Savior

A4. Tight Rope

A5. Sweet Jane (Notes from "The Thief's Journal"

B1. 4 Hours

B2. Chanachai

B3. Cover Your Eyes

B4. Strangers

B5. Sweet Jane (Version)
