= Yong Siew Toh Conservatory of Music =

Singapore's music conservatory

- 杨秀桃音乐学院
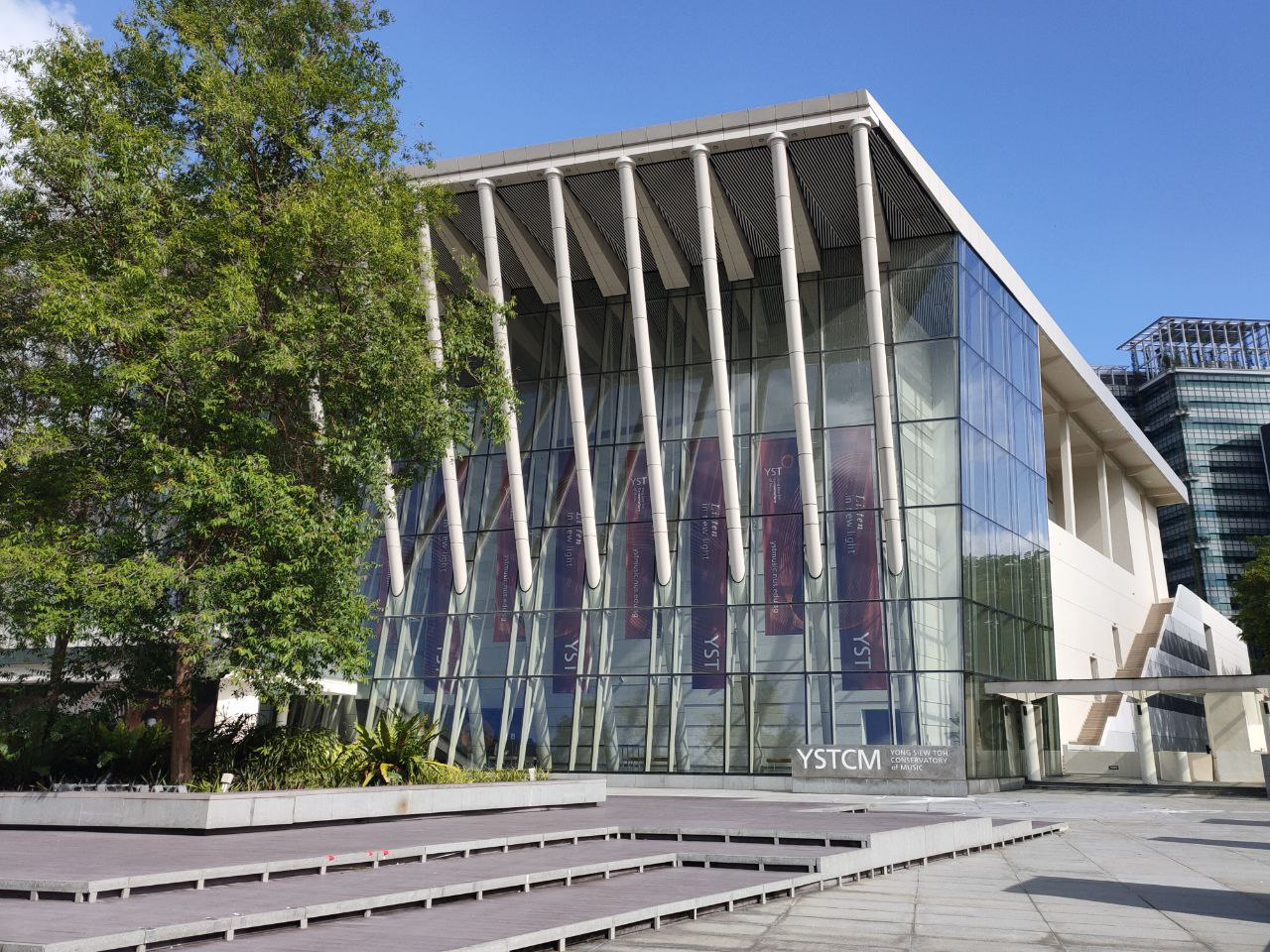
- Former names: Singapore Conservatory of Music
- Type: School
- Established: 2003
- Parent institution: National University of Singapore
- Dean: Professor Peter Tornquist
- Undergraduates: 220
- Location: 3 Conservatory Drive, Singapore, 117376; 1.3024576°N 103.7721201°E
- Website: www.ystmusic.nus.edu.sg

The Yong Siew Toh Conservatory of Music (YST Conservatory), a school of the National University of Singapore, is Singapore's first conservatory of music located at Conservatory Drive off Kent Ridge Crescent. Primarily an undergraduate institution, it offers full-time studies in 20 majors leading to a Bachelor of Music (Honours) Degree, as well as programmes for NUS students, graduate students, continuing education adult learners and young artists. The YST Conservatory maintains an undergraduate cohort of 220 Bachelor of Music students, all of whom receive full financial support through government grants, the Yong Loo Lin Trust and other donors. It also hosts a performance calendar of around 200 concerts annually.

== History ==
In 1999, Dr Tony Tan, Deputy Prime Minister of Singapore, proposed the establishment of a conservatory in Singapore within a university. An agreement was then signed in 2001 between the NUS and the Peabody Institute of the Johns Hopkins University to develop what was to be known as the Singapore Conservatory of Music. Dr Steven Baxter, former Dean at the Peabody Institute, was appointed founding director, and Goh Yew Lin was appointed the founding chairman of its governing board.

In 2003, the conservatory was renamed the Yong Siew Toh Conservatory of Music in recognition of a S$25 million gift by the Yong Loo Lin Trust, to honour Yong Siew Toh. It also welcomed its inaugural class of 72 students comprising majors in orchestral instruments, piano and composition. 2006 and 2007 saw the official opening of the current YST Conservatory building, and the inaugural class of graduates respectively. The Yong Loo Lin Trust subsequently made another contribution of S$25 million in 2008, endowing the YST Conservatory with a total gift of S$50 million, which was matched by funding from the Ministry of Education, Singapore.

In 2008, Professor Bernard Lanskey, former associate director of music at the Guildhall School of Music and Drama, was appointed director and subsequently dean of the conservatory. All 220 steady-state student positions were filled. With the support of the National Arts Council Singapore, the Young Artist Programme was established. Developments in academic programmes followed over the next few years, with the Recording Arts & Sciences major introduced in 2010, the Joint Degree Programme established with the Peabody Institute as well as the Voice major introduced in 2011, the Master in Music programme with a further major in Conducting offered in 2014, and two new majors in Music & Society and Music, Collaboration & Production introduced in 2018. Robert Tomlin, vice-chairman of Lepercq de Neuflize Asia Pte Ltd assumed the role of governing board chairman from November 2018.

In November 2020, Chong Siak Ching, CEO of the National Gallery Singapore, was appointed Chair of the YST Governing Board. Professor Peter Tornquist, Norwegian composer and research as well as former principal of the Norwegian Academy of Music, assumed the role of dean from February 2022.

== Bachelor of Music (Honours) Degree ==
The Bachelor of Music (Honours) degree programme is a four-year, full-time programme which builds out from a focus on one of 20 music majors in instrumental performance, Composition, Voice, Audio Arts and Sciences, Music & Society and Music, Collaboration & Production. Students undertake core classes in the major, electives of their choice with a possibility for a Second Major in another area, academic music studies, collaborative music-making, professional integration, alongside University General Education requirements.

Students receive access to attend and participate in the Conservatory's year-round concert calendar; support to go for student exchanges as well as overseas festivals, competitions and platforms; and pathways into the community and industry through professional integration and community engagement opportunities.

== Young Artist Programme ==
Established in 2008, the Young Artist Programme is offered to 15-18 year olds who demonstrate outstanding performance abilities, till they become eligible for placement in the Bachelor of Music programme. Students receive professional performance training and academic study, and are expected to be concurrently enrolled in Singapore schools.

== Access for National University of Singapore students ==
The YST Conservatory offers several levels of musical engagement for National University of Singapore students. Every academic year, a number of Conservatory modules are open to NUS students from all faculties. Students can further extend their exposure by taking the Minor in Music Studies as a capstone. Students can also initiate intensive major study through Access to Major, where they receive major study access for one academic year and are expected to take first-year Conservatory modules in their respective major fields. Upon satisfactory completion, they are then eligible to be considered for the Second Major, where they can take modules for second-year students and higher.

== Graduate and continuing education programmes ==
The Conservatory offers the Master of Music (MMus) as well as Master of Music Leadership (MMusL) programmes.

A two-year full-time programme, the MMus seeks to promote higher-level music study in the individual’s major area, alongside broader ensemble, pedagogical and professional capabilities.

The MMusL programme focuses on entrepreneurship and innovation, equipping graduates to navigate and lead a changing industry landscape.

In addition, adult learners can take part in a range of continuing education course offerings across areas such as composition, production, conducting, pedagogy, contextual studies and community engagement.
