= Kevin Mathews =

- Born: 15 February 1961 (age 64)
- Origin: Singapore
- Genres: Pop-rock
- Occupation: Singer
- Instruments: Vocals, guitar, keyboards
- Years active: 1990–present
- Labels: KAMCO Music
- Website: Power of Pop

Kevin Mathews (born 15 February 1961) is a Singaporean singer-songwriter and film music composer.

== Watchmen ==
Mathews formed The Watchmen in 1989 with his Anglo Chinese School classmates Tony and James Makarome. Originally a five-man band called The Hornets, The Watchmen put out three independent releases in the early 1990s, Who Watches the Watchmen, Industry & Commerce and the acclaimed This Savage Garden. This garnered the trio an invitation from BigO magazine to contribute to their New School Rock III CD in 1993. The Watchmen contributed two songs, "Please Believe Me" and "Orchard Road", which went on to become a radio favourite. New School Rock III was nominated by 987FM for the Best Local Album of 1993.

In May 1993, The Watchmen contributed the song "The High Cost Of Living" to BigO's Death Valley 92328 CD. This protest song gained attention for its local content and topical issues, which led music critic Chris Ho to describe Mathews as "the first protest singer to be recognized as such in Singaporean pop this decade."

Odyssey Music, a local distributor, decided to sign The Watchmen to a two-year contract, and in August 1993, The Watchmen released their debut album Democracy. A track from the album, "My One and Only", became a radio hit, garnering pole position on the Radio Heart Top Ten and the number three spot on the 987FM Perfect Ten. Democracy sold more than 1,000 copies, and BigO readers voted for it as the Best Local Album of 1993.

To cash in on the public's apparent infatuation with Mathews' balladeering, Odyssey Music persuaded Mathews to rush-release an EP of songs about love – called Love – in time for Valentine's Day. A track from the EP, "I Love Singapore", was later included on the Mee Pok Man movie soundtrack, with Mathews going under the nom de plume of "The Crowd".

In April 1994, Mathews' Watchmen bandmates Tony and James Makarome wrote an open letter to the press accusing him of failing to acknowledge their contributions. In particular, they were especially disappointed with his public remark that he had "got rid" of his bandmates, saying he had "accidentally dropped them into the Indian Ocean". Mathews denied this and the band broke up soon after, with Mathews announcing that he was going solo.

== Popland ==
In 1998, Mathews formed Popland, a musical duo between him and British-born bass player, Tim Nolan. The duo's first CD, Pop was released in 1997 under the name "The Crowd", which they later changed to avoid confusion with a US band of the same name. They followed this with 1998's Groovy, featuring Singaporean musician Ray Aziz on drums. Aziz also played drums on their 2002 release Action, released on Zip Records.

Popland was featured by Singapore's national newspaper, The Straits Times, played on several Singapore TV shows and various radio stations. Their music was used in the Warner Bros. hit TV show High School Reunion. The duo split in 2006 when Mathews decided to pursue a solo career.

== Solo career ==
In 2006, Mathews embarked on a solo career. In November 2008, he released the EP watchmen@midnight and his debut solo full-length album Emo FASCISM on 1 August 2013. In 2014, Mathews released the #alpacablues EP.

Mathews has been a live performer for more than thirty years and has performed at Central Park NYC (for Singapore Day 2007), the Esplanade, *SCAPE, Home Club, Blu-Jaz Cafe, Library @ Esplanade, Library @ Orchard, Timbre @ The Substation, Timbre @ The Arts House, TAB, the Prince of Wales Backpackers' Pub and other venues.

== Other areas of interest ==
In addition, Mathews is an accomplished film score writer, and has composed music for acclaimed Singapore director Eric Khoo's feature films and has also contributed music to other Singaporean films like Stories About Love, One Leg Kicking, Invisible Children, Lucky 7, Anita's Complaint and The Carrot Cake Conversations as well as TV series such as Drive and Seventh Month.

Mathews is also a prominent contributor to the Singapore music scene. He is currently a mentor under the National Arts Council's Noise Music Mentorship Programme, a mentor for the Esplanade Youth Budding Writers Programme and a judge for the 2009 and 2010 editions of the Baybeats Festival, one of the biggest indie rock festivals in the region. In addition, he manages Singapore bands like Cheating Sons and TypeWriter and operates KAMCO Music, an artist management company.

Mathews is also the owner of Power of Pop, a pop culture blog which has been commenting on music, film, comics and books for more than a decade.

He is also a tutor of business law at Ngee Ann Polytechnic. Also tutor Company Law in Temasek Polytechnic.
