= Braddell Heights Symphony Orchestra =

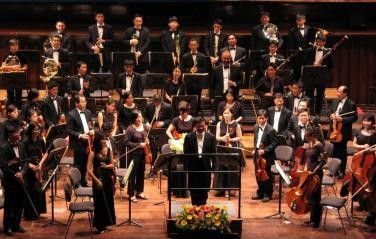
Braddell Heights Symphony Orchestra

Braddell Heights Symphony Orchestra (BHSO) is an orchestra founded in 1986 and based in Singapore.

Maestro Yan Yin Wing ran the orchestra from 1989 to 2012, where the BHSO gave more than 60 public concerts and national events including former Prime Minister Goh Chok Tong's Inauguration Dinner, the People's Association's 40th Anniversary in 2000. Internationally, the BHSO participated in numerous musical exchanges with the Korea Symphony Orchestra, the Sunigami Philharmonic Orchestra (Japan), the Penang Symphony Orchestra (Malaysia) and Krasnoyarsk Symphony Orchestra (Russia Federation).

Besides performing alongside well-known musicians from all over the world such as conductors Christopher Fifield (UK), Helen Quach (Vietnam) and cellist Paul Banda (Hungary), the BHSO has also performed with prominent local musicians including violinist Chan Yoong Han, pianist Albert Lin, soprano Stella Zhou and cellist Chan Wei Shing. The orchestra has supported the development of very young musical protégés through its "Gifted Young Musicians" series since 1988.

Many young Singaporean talents made their debut with the BHSO where they got their first opportunity to perform with an orchestra. In recent years, the BHSO has earned a reputation with its innovative approach to promoting classical music, winning over new audiences with entertaining and informative concerts presented in an engaging way. Audiences were invited to sing along with soloists and chorus in Handel's famous oratorio Messiah in 2013, and in 2015, 30 members of the public, who had little or no training in music were invited to join the chorus for a performance of Beethoven's 9th Symphony, which was performed at the Esplanade Concert Hall.
