= The Sam Willows discography =

- Studio albums: 2
- EPs: 2
- Singles: 11
- Music videos: 11

This is the discography of Singaporean indie pop musician, singer-songwriter and music producer, The Sam Willows, which consists of Benjamin Kheng, Narelle Kheng, Sandra Riley Tang and Jonathan Chua.

The Sam Willows has released two studio albums, two extended plays and eleven singles since their debut in 2012.

== Studio albums ==
List of studio albums, showing selected details
Title	Details
Take Heart	Released: October 30, 2015; Label: Sony Music Singapore; Formats: CD, digital download, streaming
I Know, But Where	Released: July 6, 2018; Label: Sony Music Singapore; Formats: CD, digital download, streaming

== Extended plays ==
List of extended plays, showing selected details
Title	Details
The Sam Willows	Released: November 12, 2012; Label: Sony Music Singapore; Formats: CD, digital download, streaming
Christmas EP	Released: November 30, 2018; Label: Sony Music Singapore; Formats: Digital download, streaming

== Singles ==
List of singles, showing year released and name of the album
Title	Year	Album
"Glasshouse (Lillywhite Edition)"	2013	Take Heart
"Take Heart"	2015	Take Heart
"For Love"	2015	Take Heart
"Rest of Your Life"	2015	Take Heart
"All Time High"	2016	Take Heart
"Keep Me Jealous"	2017	I Know, But Where
"Save Myself"	2017	I Know, But Where
"Robot"	2018	I Know, But Where
"Papa Money"	2018	I Know, But Where
"I'm Gonna Be Loved (This Christmas)"	2018	Christmas EP
"Say So" (Mandarin version) (ft. Joanna Dong)	2019	Non-album single

== Music videos ==
List of music videos, showing year released and name of the director(s)
Title	Year	Director(s)	Ref.
"Glasshouse (Lillywhite Edition)"	2013	Bobbing Buoy Films	
"Take Heart"	2015	The Sam Willows	
"For Love"	2015	Martin Hong	
"All Time High"	2016	Nicholas Lo	
"Keep Me Jealous"	2017	Sandra Riley Tang	
"Save Myself"	2017	Geoff Ang	
"Robot"	2018	Jasper Tan	
"Papa Money"	2018	Jeremy Steven	
"I'm Gonna Be Loved (This Christmas)"	2018	Tariq Mansor	
"Thirsty"	2019	Jasper Tan	
"Say So" (Mandarin version) (ft. Joanna Dong)	2019	Bong (HYPEBONG)	
