= Royal Blues (album) =

Studio album by Dragonette
- Released: November 18, 2016
- Length: 48:09
- Label: Dragonette Inc.
- Producer: Dragonette; Matt Schwartz; xSDTRK; Mike Mago; Howie Beck; The Sam Willows; Dan Grech-Marguerat (voc.); Avenue; Davey Badiuk; La+ch; Stefan Gräslund; James Reynolds

Dragonette chronology
Bodyparts (2012)	Royal Blues (2016)	Twennies (2022)

Singles from Royal Blues
- 1. "Let the Night Fall" Released: June 16, 2015; 2. "Lonely Heart" Released: May 27, 2016; 3. "Body 2 Body" Released: July 21, 2016; 4. "Sweet Poison" Released: September 16, 2016; 5. "Secret Stash" Released: November 18, 2016

Royal Blues is the fourth studio album by Canadian electronic music band Dragonette, released on November 18, 2016 by their independent record label. The album received minor success in Canada, peaking at 100 on the Canadian Albums Chart in December 2016. Royal Blues features production collaborations with musicians such as Matt Schwartz, xSDTRK, Mike Mago, Davey Badiuk, and Sam Willows.

== Track listing ==
No.	Title	Writer(s)	Producer(s)	Length
1.	"Let the Night Fall"	Martina Sorbara; Dan Kurtz	Dragonette; Davey Badiuk; Avenue	4:22
2.	"Body 2 Body"	Sorbara; Kurtz; Pierre-Luc Rioux; Yonatan Ayal	Dragonette; Badiuk; xSDTRK	3:18
3.	"Lonely Heart"	Sorbara; Kurtz; Stefan Gräslund; Anthony Rossomando	Stefan Gräslund	3:37
4.	"Royal Blues"	Sorbara; Kurtz; Joel Stouffer	Dragonette; Badiuk; Avenue	4:00
5.	"Sweet Poison" (featuring Dada)	Sorbara; Matt Schwartz; R. Benvegnu	Matt Schwartz; La+ch	3:28
6.	"Secret Stash" (with Mike Mago)	Sorbara; Michiel Thomassen; Daniel Traynor	Mike Mago	3:44
7.	"Save My Neck"	Sorbara; Benvegnu	La+ch	3:07
8.	"Darth Vader"	Sorbara; Kurtz; Schwartz; James Reynolds	Dragonette; Schwartz; Reynolds	4:23
9.	"High Five"	Sorbara; Kurtz; Badiuk; Elizabeth Boland	Dragonette; Howie Beck	2:38
10.	"Detonate"	Sorbara; Kurtz; Mark Nilan Jr.	Dragonette; Badiuk	4:20
11.	"Love Can't Touch Me Now"	Sorbara; Kurtz; Adam Atlas Hunt	Dragonette; Badiuk; The Sam Willows	3:38
12.	"Lost Teenagers"	Sorbara; Kurtz; Andy Stochansky	Dragonette; Beck	3:58
13.	"Future Ghost"	Sorbara; Kurtz; Jonathan Chua; Benjamin Kheng; Sandra Riley Tang; Narelle Kheng	Dragonette; Badiuk; The Sam Willows	3:36
Total length:				48:09

Japanese deluxe edition bonus tracks
No.	Title	Length
14.	"Resistor"	3:06
15.	"My Computer"	3:30
16.	"21st Century"	2:41
Total length:		57:36

== Charts ==
Chart (2012)	Peak position
Canadian Albums (Billboard)	100
