= Royal Blues =

Royal Blues may refer to:

- Royal Blues F.C., a Taiwanese football club
- Royal Blues (album), by Dragonette
