= CTTS =

CTTS can be an abbreviation for:

- Central Texas Turnpike System
- Circle Takes the Square, an experimental screamo band
- Classical T Tauri Star

== See also ==
- CTSS (disambiguation)
