= Gentle Bones discography =

- Studio albums: 2
- EPs: 5
- Singles: 36

This is the discography of Singaporean pop musician, singer-songwriter and music producer, Gentle Bones also known as Joel Tan.

Gentle Bones has released 2 studio album, 5 extended plays, and 36 singles since his debut in 2012.

== Albums ==
=== Studio albums ===
Title	Album details
B4NGER PROJECT	Released: 30 March 2018; Label: Universal Music Singapore; Formats: Digital download, streaming
Gentle Bones	Released: 10 September 2021; Label: Cross Ratio Entertainment; Formats: Digital download, streaming

== Extended plays ==
Title	Album details
Gentle Bones	Released: 28 October 2014; Label: –; Formats: CD, digital download, streaming
Geniuses & Thieves	Released: 3 June 2016; Label: Universal Music Singapore; Formats: CD, digital download, streaming
Michelle	Released: 26 November 2018; Label: Universal Music Singapore; Formats: Digital download, streaming
Better With You	Released: 18 December 2020; Label: Cross Ratio Entertainment; Formats: Digital download, streaming
Exoskeleton	Released: 12 May 2023; Label: Warner Music Singapore; Formats: Digital download, streaming

== Singles ==
Title	Year	Album
"Waking Up"	2011	Non-album single
"Here's A Letter"	2012	Non-album single
"Until We Die"	2013	Gentle Bones
"Save Me"	2014	Gentle Bones
"Elusive"	2014	Gentle Bones
"Lost"	2014	Gentle Bones
"Settle Down"	2015	Gentle Bones
"Sixty Five"	2015	Non-album single
"Geniuses & Thieves"	2016	Geniuses & Thieves
"Run Tell Daddy"	2016	Geniuses & Thieves
"Shifting Over"	2016	Geniuses & Thieves
"White Noise"	2017	Non-album single
"JU1Y"	2017	B4NGER PROJECT
"B4NGER"	2017	B4NGER PROJECT
"I Wouldn't Know Any Better Than You"	2018	Michelle
"Smile For Me"	2019	Non-album singles
"Why Do We?"	2020	Non-album singles
"Be Cool"	2020	Non-album singles
"Two Sides"	2020	Non-album singles
"Shouldn't Have To Run"	2020	Non-album singles
"Don't You Know Yet?" (你還不知道？)	2020	Non-album singles
"dear me,"	2020	the art of thanking yourself
"Better With You"	2020	Better With You
"Put My Hands Up"	2020	Better With You
"A Day at a Time"	2021	Gentle Bones
"Daily Dose of Love (feat. Karencici)" (一天加點愛)	2021	Gentle Bones
"Positive Procrastination"	2021	Gentle Bones
"You're My Superhero"	2021	Gentle Bones
"At Least I Had You (feat. JJ Lin)"	2021	Gentle Bones
"Modern Romancing (feat. Julia Wu)" (摩登愛情)	2022	Gentle Bones (Deluxe)
"Can We Have a Conversation?"	2022	Gentle Bones (Deluxe)
"I'm An Artiste"	2022	Non-album single
"Good in Me"	2022	Bones & The Boy
"The Right Words"	2023	Exoskeleton
"Please Excuse My Hesitation"	2023	Exoskeleton
"Connect the Dots"	2023	Non-album single
