= Young & Fabulous =

- Theatrical release poster
- 最佳伙扮
- Directed by: Michael Woo; Joyce Lee
- Written by: Rebecca Leow; Allan Ho
- Produced by: Joyce Lee; Shelin Ng; Clara Cheo
- Starring: Aloysius Pang; Joshua Tan; Joyce Chu; Gurmit Singh; Quan Yi Fong; Henry Thia; Jeffrey Xu; Jordan Ng
- Cinematography: Derrick Loo
- Edited by: Natalie Soh
- Music by: JerryC
- Production company: Encore Films
- Distributed by: Golden Village Pictures
- Release date: May 26, 2016
- Running time: 107 minutes
- Country: Singapore
- Languages: Mandarin; English
- Budget: S$1.5 million
- Box office: S$1.3 million

Young & Fabulous (Chinese: 最佳伙扮; pinyin: Zuìjiā Huǒbàn) is a 2016 Singaporean cosplay-themed and coming of age film directed by Michael Woo and Joyce Lee. It stars Aloysius Pang, Joshua Tan, Joyce Chu, Gurmit Singh, Henry Thia, Quan Yi Fong, Jeffrey Xu and Jordan Ng. The film was released in Singapore, Malaysia, Indonesia and Vietnam.

== Plot ==
A group of teenage friends—Royston, Violet, and Hao Ren, overcome all challenges and obstacles to fulfil their dreams. On their journey of self-discovery, they also learn the meaning of friendship, the different perspectives in parent-child and teacher-student relationships, and ultimately the need to have the courage to stand up for what they believe in.

Bonded through a fondness for cosplay, the three friends not only help each other out at school, but also empower each other to become better individuals. Their natural talents in different aspects also make them a great team—the creative Royston designs and tailors the costumes; social media queen Violet teaches them how to pose with confidence, while Hao Ren puts his street smarts to good use in their negotiations with the vendors. Conflict arises when their cosplay hobby, kept a secret amongst themselves till then, is discovered by their parents. The parents strongly object to their involvement in cosplay, as they believe that it is juvenile and strange hobby that wastes time and effort, and will cause them to neglect their studies. They warn the three to discontinue their involvement in cosplay or risk getting into deeper trouble with them. Royston, Violet, and Hao Ren are in a dilemma. In this competitive era with an education system that focuses on academic excellence, how will the younger generation find courage and confidence to hold on to their hopes and dreams when they are up against a society that values practicality over creativity?

== Cast ==
- Aloysius Pang as Royston Chio, a top student who wishes to be a fashion designer
  - Ivan Lo as young Royston Chio
- Joshua Tan as Hao Ren, a smooth talker who has crazy business ideas
- Joyce Chu as Violet Ong, the school's social media star and Royston's crush
- Gurmit Singh as Mr Boo, the school's discipline master
- Quan Yi Fong as Liu Mei Feng, Royston's mother and former fashion designer
- Henry Thia as Hao Lian, Hao Ren's father and karung guni man
- Jeffrey Xu as Chen Jun, a cosplayer from China who often cross-dresses
- Jordan Ng as Jordan Chio, Royston's younger brother
- Constance Song as Violet's mother
- Bernard Tan as Violet's father
- The Sam Willows
  - Benjamin Kheng as Jay Lee, the school bully
  - Narelle Kheng as Orange Tan, Violet's best friend
  - Sandra Riley Tang as Nadia Ang, Violet and Orange's good friend
  - Jonathan Chua as Bamboo Ng, Jay's right-hand man
- Isaac Lim as Daniel Lim, Jay's clique
- Tristan Goh as Kenji of Kantana, Royston's cosplay antagonist
- Ferlyn Wong as Yumi of Kantana, Royston's cosplay antagonist

== Production ==
=== Casting and crew ===
On 1 April 2015, during the press conference, it was announced that the film would be directed by Kelvin Sng, and would be projected to be released by November 2015. However, there had been delays in the post-production process, and Michael Woo and Joyce Lee were revealed as the new directors, with Lee also taking up the role of the executive producer and producer.

Quan Yi Fong was cast as Royston's mother, which was her first major role since starring in 12 Storeys in 1997, and said that she "had a shock" when she heard about her role, according to an interview with The Straits Times. Gurmit Singh, who had usually been cast in comedic roles, found it a "challenge" playing the role of Mr Boo, a strict discipline master.

In a Lianhe Wanbao interview, director and producer Joyce Lee revealed that Aloysius Pang, who plays the lead role Royston in Young & Fabulous, broke a blood vessel in his eye during the second day of filming, and his reddened eye was subsequently touched up in post-production. Lee also mentioned that the Melbourne-born Joshua Tan, who plays a smooth talker Hao Ren in the movie, went through a month of Mandarin lessons with his co-star Joyce Chu before filming began. Young & Fabulous is also Malaysian Internet celebrity Joyce Chu's film debut.

=== Filming ===
Filming started on 15 April 2015, with a production budget of S$1.2 million. It was later revealed that the budget had risen to S$1.5 million.

=== Music ===
The film score for Young & Fabulous is composed by Taiwanese composer JerryC, who penned Our Times' film theme song A Little Happiness. Young & Fabulous' theme song, entitled "3 2 1 Go!", is composed by Namewee and sung by Joyce Chu. Its music video was uploaded onto YouTube on 11 April 2016.

== Reception ==
=== Critical reception ===
Yip Wai Yee of The Straits Times rated Young & Fabulous a 2.5 out of 5 stars, feeling that "it is actually the older actors here who make any sort of impression", while the younger actors were mostly "hammy and over-the-top", and "most of them have clearly been handpicked just because they have social media clout".

Marcus Goh of Yahoo Movies rated Young & Fabulous a 2.0/5, as "it lacks authenticity in its approach to the topic, and tries to make up for this by tossing in other genres to fill the gaps".

Jedd Jong of F*** Magazine gave the film 3 out of 5 stars, stating that "what it lacks in subtlety, it somewhat makes up for in humour and heart".

Young & Fabulous is currently scored at 6.3 out of 10 stars on the Internet Movie Database.

=== Box office ===
Young & Fabulous managed to earn S$372,000 in five days and went on to collect S$1.2 million at the box office in 19 days. The film eventually grossed a total of S$1.3 million, becoming one of four Singaporean movies to hit S$1 million at the box office. It is also one of the Top 10 Asian Movies in Singapore in 2016.
