= Sztorm 68 =

The Sztorm 68 was a Polish musical band established in Kraków, Nowa Huta in 1991. The founders of this band were skinheads (sometimes even referred to as "Redskins") by some authors.

== History ==
From its inception, Sztorm 68 generated significant controversy, including within nationalist circles, due to its ideological stance. Members expressed sympathy for organizations such as the "Patriotic Front of the Socialist Left" and voiced support for the activities of the Patriotic Union "Grunwald", a pro-communist nationalist group from the late PRL era.

The band performed live during the early 1990s, including concerts in Kraków, Szczytno (with "Deportacja 68"), and in 1992 alongside groups such as "Zadruga", "Trikwert", and "The Deluge". Its first three shows reportedly ended in violent clashes, as the group was perceived as "communist" by many attendees in the immediate post-1989 period, shortly after the fall of the Polish People's Republic. At the Szczytno concert, an attack was allegedly carried out by cadets from the local police academy, who were difficult to distinguish from skinheads due to their short-cropped hair and black aviation-style jackets. Another performance in Żory with "Szczerbiec" also ended in fighting, despite ideological similarities between the bands, due to open hostility among their supporters.

In the early 1990s, a Wrocław concert featured Sztorm 68 alongside "Konkwista 88", a notable juxtaposition of contrasting ideological messages that led to scuffles, brawls, and deepened divisions within the skinhead scene, particularly among neo-Slavic, national-Catholic, and neo-Nazi factions. Some attendees from Kraków and Wrocław fan circles departed early, aligning instead with the national-Catholic faction centered around the band Legion. This period is cited by some observers as marking a broader schism and growing animosity between these subgroups.

After its initial disbandment, Sztorm 68's only notable output during the subsequent years was the recording of five songs for a 2004 split release with "The Gits", titled Muzyka Dla Elity!. Individual tracks also appeared on compilations in the Muzyka ulicy muzyka dla mas series (Volumes 1 and 2).

The group experienced a roughly decade-long hiatus before reactivating in 2013. A planned concert on June 7, 2014, featuring Sztorm 68 alongside GAN, "Hippie Raus", and "Slavic Rebirth" organized by supporters of the Arka Gdynia football club (Gdynia Nationalists) was canceled due to national mourning following the death of Wojciech Jaruzelski. According to some accounts, this would have been only the band's seventh concert overall, as it had performed just six times in its earlier years.

The reactivation did not lead to major changes in the group's approach or reception. As in previous decades, at least one later concert reportedly involved a confrontation with Neo-Nazis.

== Ideology ==
The number "68" refers to an anti-Zionist campaign taken out in 1968 (also regarded as antisemitic by some historians) suggesting the band was strongly anti-Zionist.

Sztorm 68 is frequently described as the most prominent representative of the national-socialist (left leaning) wing of RAC in Poland, incorporating elements of revolutionary nationalism, national communism, national Bolshevism, and "redskin" ideology. Its lyrics focus on working-class struggles, anti-imperialism, anti-Zionism, criticism of the West, and nostalgia for certain aspects of the PRL era (e.g., references to Moczar, the state of martial law, and anti-Western sentiments). The group's positions have drawn criticism from both anti-communist nationalists and mainstream leftists, while also attracting accusations of promoting controversial or grotesque views.

Despite limited live appearances, Sztorm 68 has attained a cult status within certain segments of the Polish nationalist and skinhead music scene. Its output remains available through specialized labels and compilations.

== Bibliography ==
- Pankowski, Rafał (2010). The Populist Radical Right in Poland: The Patriots. London: Routledge, 2010. ISBN 978-0-415-47353-8
- Giusti, Serena, and Elisa Piras (eds.). Democracy and Fake News: Information Manipulation and Post-Truth Politics. London: Routledge, 2021. ISBN 978-0-367-27398-9
- Tomasiewicz J., Między pamięcią autentyczna a pamięcią fałszywą. Polityzacja subkultury i subkulturyzacja polityki na przykładzie ruchu skinheads w Polsce, S. Buryła, L. Gąsowska, D. Ossowska, Popkulturowe formy pamięci, Warszawa 2018, s. 33–61, ISBN 978-83-658-3277-1
