= HubbaBubbas =

Singaporean band

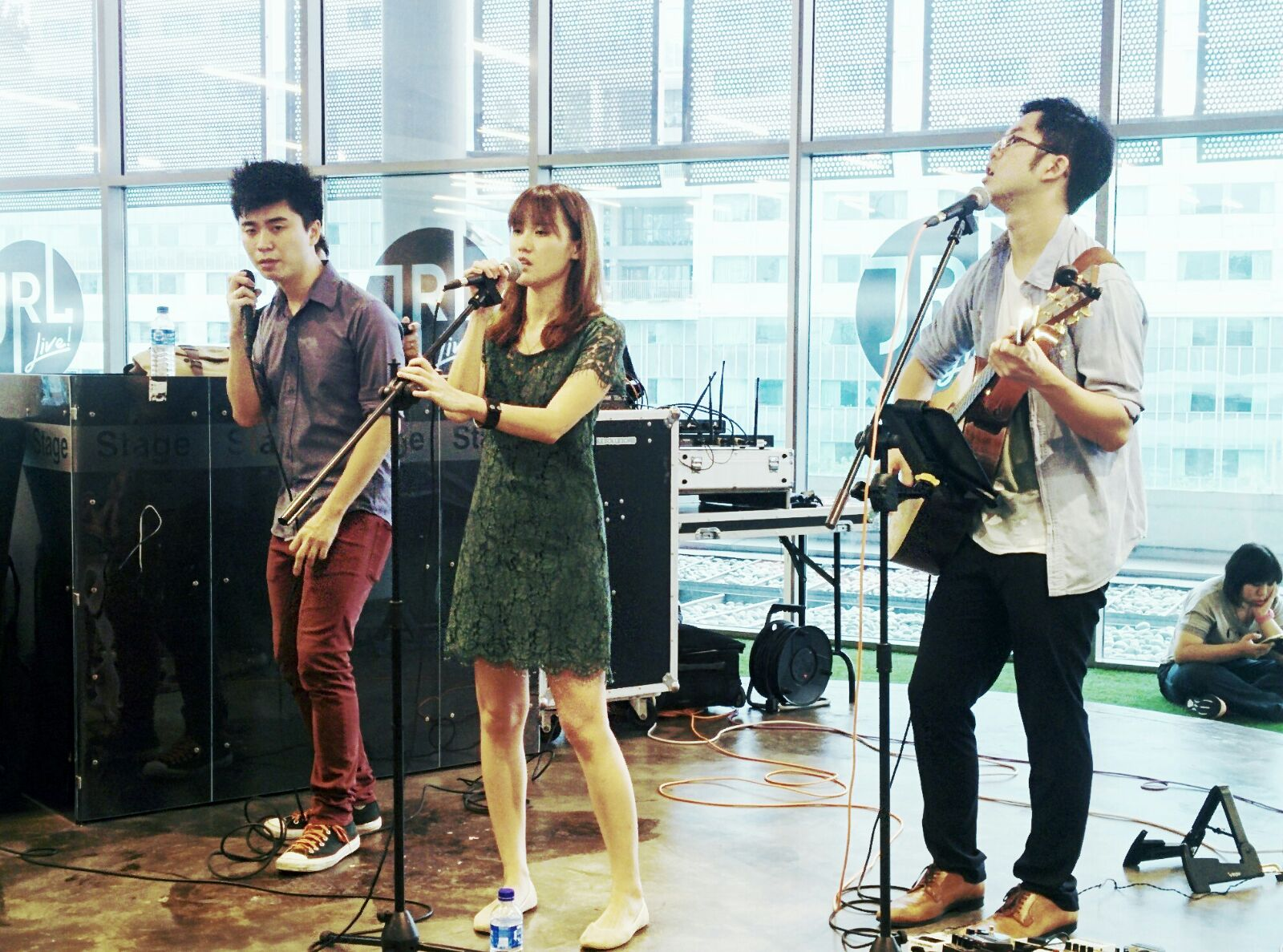
- HubbaBubbas performing at Jurong Regional Library on 17 October 2015. L to R: Mervyn Ye, Stephanie Lim, Ryan Chan

Background information
- Also known as: HBBBs
- Origin: Singapore
- Genres: Post-acoustic, a cappella, R&B, hip hop, jazz, indie pop
- Years active: 2012–present
- Label: Umami Records
- Members: Ryan Chan; Stephanie Lim; Mervyn Ye
- Website: www.hbbbsband.com

HubbaBubbas is a Singaporean post-acoustic trio, founded in June 2011, consisting of lead vocalist Stephanie Lim, guitarist/backing vocalist Ryan Chan and beatboxer/backing vocalist Mervyn Ye. They are one known for combining various genres of music, and having performed at various local and international events.

== History ==
The trio met when they were studying at Temasek Secondary School. Lim, who initially held dual Canadian and Singaporean citizenship, studied at the University of British Columbia, before renouncing her Canadian citizenship to join the other two. They started off as an a cappella group before incorporating instruments as well. They started performing as street musicians, and then played at pubs and bars such as Timbre and Wala Wala. According to Chan, the band's name came out when he was talking to his baby niece one day, and asked her what their band should be called, and she replied with 'hubba-bubba'. Their unique blend of several music genres made them rise to popularity.

HubbaBubbas have performed at the Istana Open House, World Blood Donor Day, Singapore Night Festival, Getai Ethnica, Singapore Writers Festival, and the opening ceremony of the 2015 Southeast Asian Games.

Since 2015, HubbaBubbas has become part of the *SCAPE Invasion Tour, together with artists such as Shigga Shay, Gentle Bones and Daphne Khoo, where they tour and perform a series of concerts in schools, bringing their music to a wider range of audience. Their song, "Dancing on the World" was featured in the compilation album Songs of the Games for the 2015 Southeast Asian Games held in Singapore.

It was announced that HubbaBubbas will be releasing their first EP in October 2015, however, it was later confirmed to be out on 12 August 2016, entitled Amy(gdala).

== Musical style ==
HubbaBubbas has been influenced by various genres of music, and combines them to create an unorthodox sound that twists genres and defies conventions, performing songs ranging from R&B, pop, hip-hop to jazz. Most of their songs involve tight harmonies, and combine elements of acoustic music with a cappella, occasionally with the use of other instruments.

== Discography ==
=== Extended plays ===
- A Hubba-Christmas (2013)
- Amy(gdala) (2016)

=== Singles ===
Year	Title	Album	Label
2016	Address	Amy(gdala)	Umami Records
