= Take Heart =

Take Heart may refer to:

- Take Heart (Juice Newton album), 1979
- Take Heart (The Sam Willows album), 2015

== See also ==
- Take Hart, 1977–1983 television programme presented by Tony Hart
