= Encore Films =

Film distribution and production company based in Singapore

Encore Films Pte Ltd
- Native name
- Traditional Chinese: 創藝電影私人有限公司
- Simplified Chinese: 创艺电影私人有限公司
- Type: Private
- Industry: Media, Entertainment
- Founded: 2003
- Headquarters: Singapore
- Area served: Singapore; Malaysia; Thailand; Indonesia; Philippines; Vietnam; India; Brunei; Taiwan; Australia
- Key people: Joyce Lee (Managing Director)
- Products: Film distribution, Film production
- Website: www.encorefilms.com

Encore Films is a film distribution and production company based in Singapore. It distributes primarily Japanese and other Asian content in Singapore, Malaysia, Indonesia, Philippines, Vietnam, Hong Kong, India, Brunei, Taiwan and Australia. Some titles released by Encore Films include the Death Note film series, Non-Stop, The Forbidden Kingdom, Dragon Blade, Cold War 1 & 2, Attack on Titan 1 & 2 as well as Studio Ghibli's animations Ponyo on the Cliff by the Sea and The Wind Rises. In 2016, the company produced and released its first Singaporean film production Young & Fabulous.

== History ==
The company was founded in 2003 by Singaporean director and producer Joyce Lee, with the aim of "bringing quality films to the audience in the South East Asia region". Its sister company Simply Fun handles video distribution, cinematic subtitling and other post-production services.

== Distribution ==
=== Notable releases ===
The Death Note film series, which includes Death Note, Death Note 2: The Last Name, spin-off L Change the World and Death Note: Light Up The New World, has been the box office record holder for Japanese films for the past 11 years. The four films grossed over S$5.2 million combined, and went on to become the No. 1 Japanese film series in Singapore.

Both Dragon Blade and Attack on Titan were among the top 10 Asian films in Singapore in 2015, with box office takings of S$2.6 million and S$821,500 respectively. The Dragon Blade cast – Jackie Chan, John Cusack, Adrien Brody, Choi Si-won, Lin Peng, and Mika Wang – visited Singapore in February 2015 for the film press conference, red carpet and gala premiere event.

Cold War 2 became one of the top 10 Asian films in Singapore in 2016, with a box office performance of S$2.1 million. In July 2016, the stars of Cold War 2 – Chow Yun Fat, Aaron Kwok, and Eddie Peng – promoted the film in Singapore with a press conference, red carpet and gala premiere event held at Marina Bay Sands. The sequel topped the box office during its opening weekend, and eventually doubled the box office earnings of its first film.

The company released Makoto Shinkai's animation your name. in Vietnam in January 2017, which became the No. 1 Japanese film in the country. In 2023, beginning with Shinkai's Suzume, Encore Films expanded its distribution scope to the Philippines and Thailand, with Warner Bros. Pictures overseeing theatrical distribution in these territories and as of 2023, they currently serve as the de facto theatrical licensee of newly released Studio Ghibli titles in Southeast Asia and India beginning with The Boy and the Heron. (Note: mm2 Entertainment handles catalog distribution in Singapore, Malaysia, Brunei, Indonesia, Thailand (co-distributed with Shinesaeng Ad. Venture), Philippines (co-distributed with Reality MM Studios), and Cambodia.)

With the release of Kung Fu Soccer, Encore Films further expanded its distribution scope to Australian and North American markets.

Top 25 films released by Encore Films in Singapore
Rank	Title	Year	Box office gross (SGD)
1	The Forbidden Kingdom	2008	$3,350,000
2	Dragon Blade	2015	$2,587,457
3	Cold War 2	2016	$2,062,210
4	Death Note 2: The Last Name	2006	$1,750,000
5	Death Note	2006	$1,420,000
6	The Lost Bladesman	2011	$1,330,000
7	Young & Fabulous	2016	$1,316,206
8	L Change the World	2008	$1,280,000
9	A Chinese Ghost Story	2011	$970,658
10	Cold War	2012	$919,998
11	Death Note: Light Up The New World	2016	$852,473
12	Wishing Stairs	2003	$840,000
13	Attack on Titan	2015	$821,485
14	The Promise	2005	$718,000
15	League of Gods	2016	$713,257
16	Killers	2010	$683,050
17	Brotherhood	2004	$580,000
18	My Girlfriend is an Agent	2009	$553,417
19	The Guillotines	2012	$532,894
20	The Four	2012	$530,766
21	Monga	2010	$458,975
22	Keeper of Darkness	2015	$435,786
23	Ponyo on the Cliff by the Sea	2009	$428,501
24	Ju-On 3	2014	$402,280
25	Attack on Titan 2	2015	$393,568

== Production ==
Produced and co-directed by Joyce Lee, the company's first film production Young & Fabulous was produced at a S$1.5 million budget, and starred Aloysius Pang, Malaysian Internet celebrity Joyce Chu, Joshua Tan of Ah Boys to Men, Gurmit Singh, Henry Thia, Quan Yi Fong, Jeffrey Xu and Jordan Ng. The film is a coming-of-age story about three teenagers who strive to overcome numerous obstacles in order to fulfil their dreams. It grossed over S$1.3 million at the Singapore box office, and was one of four Singaporean films to hit S$1 million at the local box office. Young & Fabulous also became one of the top 10 Asian films in Singapore in 2016. The film was subsequently released in Malaysia, Indonesia, and Vietnam.
