= Lil Wild =

- Genre: Adventure; Comedy; Educational
- Created by: Sapna Angural; Barry Toa; Nicholas Oh
- Written by: Elise Bradley; Tess Meyer; Jeannie Chia; K Ravin (season 1); Sergio Delfino (season 2)
- Directed by: Sergio Delfino; Sarah de Gaudemar (season 3)
- Voices of: Madison Hatfield; Alejandro Antonio Ruiz; Vanille Velasquez; Aimee Smith; Kera O'Bryon; Rachel Foeller
- Opening theme: "It's Time to Get a Little Wild" (performed by Stephen Frost, Matthew S. Taylor, and Jenny Bailey Lassell)
- Composers: Bruno Cortina (seasons 1-2); Omar El-Deeb (seasons 1-2); Stephen Frost (seasons 1-2); Jenny Bailey Lassell (seasons 1-2); Matthew S. Taylor (seasons 1-2); Javier Antonio Albornoz (season 3)
- Countries of origin: Singapore; Indonesia
- Original language: English
- No. of seasons: 3
- No. of episodes: 56 (Note: In seasons 2 and 3, every episode is split into parts of two halves; it would total 36 episodes if each two-parter were counted as one episode.) (+ 12 specials)

Production
- Executive producers: Nicholas Oh (seasons 1-2); Barry Toa (seasons 1-2); Mike Wiluan (Note: Credited as a "co-executive producer" for Infinite Studios in the first two seasons, before given a proper "executive producer" credit in the final season.); Freddie Yeo; Seng Choon Meng
- Producers: Jean Salvador (season 1); Ye Marn Hein (seasons 2-3)
- Running time: 10 minutes (season 1); 11 minutes (seasons 2-3); 21–60 minutes (specials)
- Production companies: Mediacorp; Infinite Studios

Original release
- Network: Mediacorp 5
- Release: 3 September 2020 – 29 January 2023 (Note: Eleven TV specials for the series were subsequently released after its conclusion, with the final special releasing in October 2025.)

Related
- Lil Wild: In the Big City

Lil Wild is a Singaporean-Indonesian computer-animated children's television series created by Sapna Angural, Barry Toa, and Nicholas Oh. Produced by Mediacorp, in collaboration with Infinite Studios, it premiered on Mediacorp 5's Okto on 5 programming block on 3 September 2020. Prior to that, a special preview was shown after the National Day Parade Morning Parade on 9 August. New premieres would routinely air on the channel on Thursdays and Fridays, at 5:30 PM.

A Holiday special was released on 30 December 2020. The series ended its run on 29 January 2023, totaling three seasons of 56 episodes. Following this, eleven other TV specials for the series were gradually released after the series ended, from December 2023 to October 2025. A series of shorts promoting the show were released as well.

On 3 December 2025, a spinoff and soft reboot based on the series was announced for a late 2026 release, titled Lil Wild: In the Big City. Produced by Scrawl Animation and Industrial Brothers, the series was released on September 11, 2026.

Lil Wild was Singapore's first locally-produced animal-based animation.

== Plot ==
Lil Wild focuses on the friendship of an unlikely crew of "tweenage" zoo animals: Rara the action packed elephant, Wobi the genius alligator, Meep the timid white tiger, Kokeko the sassy otter, and Dil the fearless pigeon. Accompanied by Suzie, a human zookeeper who looks after them, the lively crew embark on a series of life-altering adventures, while trying to keep themselves and other resident creatures in Lil Wild Park out of trouble.

== Characters ==
- Rara (voiced by Madison Hatfield in the series, and Kelsey Maher in the specials) is a female elephant. She is impulsive and outspoken, unlike her cool-headed mother, Nora. Rara's actions sometimes lands her in big trouble, but she always has the best intentions.
- Wobi (voiced by Alejandro Antonio Ruiz) is a male Chinese alligator. He is a super-genius who prefers using his wits, rather than his fists. He has a smaller stature than most alligators, a fact he is often troubled by.
- Meep (voiced by Aimee Smith in seasons 1 and 3, and Kera O'Bryon in season 2) is a male white tiger. He is the youngest of the bunch, and very timid. He wishes to be a brave tiger who can shout a loud roar instead of a mere "meep".
- Kokeko (voiced by Vanille Velasquez) is a female otter. She is sassy and fabulous, and has a legion of online followers. In reality, she often feels insecure and that she would be worthless without her popularity.
- Dil (voiced by Alejandro Antonio Ruiz) is a male blue crow pigeon. Though he can't fly, he is inquisitive and fearless, which often gets him into sticky situations. However, due to his earnest, carefree approach towards life, he always escapes unscathed and unbothered.
- Suzie (voiced by Rachel Foeller) is a human female and zookeeper of Lil Wild Park. She has the ability to speak with animals, which includes Rara and the gang. As such, she takes care of their well being and ensures their safety, while teaching them facts about the world around them.

== Production ==
Lil Wild was created and conceptualised at Mediacorp, and animated by Infinite Studios in Batam, Indonesia, who also helped co-produce the show. Mocca Studio, another Indonesia-based studio, assisted with animation services as well. The main six characters, alongside a couple of supporting characters, were designed by Chloe Chang.

The voice recording services of the series were handled by Stereo Couture for the first two seasons, and Kuala Lumpur-based Tribe Audio for the final season. Singaporean hip-hop artist Shigga Shay guest starred in the series, in his first voice role. He voiced the character Kwong, who debuted in the 2020 Holiday special "Welcome to the Wild".

== Episodes ==
=== Series overview ===
Series	Episodes	Originally released	
Series	Episodes	First released	Last released
1	16	3 September 2020	22 October 2020
Special		30 December 2020	
2	20	1 January 2022	26 February 2022
3	20	27 November 2022	29 January 2023
Specials	11	23 December 2023	20 October 2025

=== Season 1 (2020) ===
No.	Title	Written by	Storyboard by	Original release date
1	"A Lil Piece and Quiet"	K Ravin	Paige Koedijk	3 September 2020
2	"Chives Out"	Tess Meyer	Cory Mathis and Roii Lee	3 September 2020
3	"The Flamingos Will Rise"	Tess Meyer	Cory Mathis and Roii Lee	10 September 2020
4	"Do You Even Branch Bro?"	Tess Meyer	Cory Mathis and Roii Lee	10 September 2020
5	"Surprise!"	Jeannie Cha	Cory Mathis and Roii Lee	17 September 2020
6	"Plastic Paranoia"	Tess Meyer	Cory Mathis and Roii Lee	17 September 2020
7	"Zoolympics"	Elise Bradley	Paige Koedijk and Roii Lee	24 September 2020
8	"Wobi's Butterfly"	K Ravin	Cory Mathis and Roii Lee	24 September 2020
9	"Otterly Fabulous"	Jeannie Cha	Paige Koedijk and Roii Lee	1 October 2020
10	"Operation Get Wild"	Elise Bradley	Cory Mathis and Roii Lee	1 October 2020
11	"Wild Rumours"	Tess Meyer	Roii Lee	8 October 2020
12	"Kokeko in Charge"	Jeannie Cha	Cory Mathis and Roii Lee	8 October 2020
13	"Ryan Air"	Tess Meyer	Roii Lee	15 October 2020
14	"Space Captain Wobi"	Elise Bradley	Cory Mathis and Roii Lee	15 October 2020
15	"It's Only Logical"	Tess Meyer	Cory Mathis and Roii Lee	22 October 2020
16	"What Would Rara Do?"	Tess Meyer	Cory Mathis and Roii Lee	22 October 2020

=== Season 2 (2022) ===
No. overall	No. in season	Title	Written by (Note: Episodes in season 2 were written by Elise Bradley, Tess Meyer, Jeannie Chia, and Sergio Delfino. Unlike the first season, the writers are not individually credited for which episodes they wrote.)	Storyboard by (Note: Episodes in season 2 were storyboarded by Cory Mathis, Roii Lee, Neil Reed, and Indria Qirana. Unlike the first season, the artists are not individually credited for which episodes they storyboarded.)	Original release date
17	1	"In the Family"	TBA	TBA	1 January 2022
18	2	"In the Family"	TBA	TBA	1 January 2022
19	3	"Hide and Seek"	TBA	TBA	8 January 2022
20	4	"Hide and Seek"	TBA	TBA	8 January 2022
21	5	"Tech Saves the Day"	TBA	TBA	8 January 2022
22	6	"Tech Saves the Day"	TBA	TBA	8 January 2022
23	7	"Operation Meep Sweep"	TBA	TBA	15 January 2022
24	8	"Operation Meep Sweep"	TBA	TBA	15 January 2022
25	9	"Invasion of the Buddy Snatchers"	TBA	TBA	22 January 2022
26	10	"Invasion of the Buddy Snatchers"	TBA	TBA	22 January 2022
27	11	"Breakout"	TBA	TBA	29 January 2022
28	12	"Breakout"	TBA	TBA	29 January 2022
29	13	"Lil Wild in the Big City"	TBA	TBA	5 February 2022
30	14	"Lil Wild in the Big City"	TBA	TBA	5 February 2022
31	15	"Urban Jungle"	TBA	TBA	12 February 2022
32	16	"Urban Jungle"	TBA	TBA	12 February 2022
33	17	"Re-union"	TBA	TBA	19 February 2022
34	18	"Re-union"	TBA	TBA	19 February 2022
35	19	"Showdown"	TBA	TBA	26 February 2022
36	20	"Showdown"	TBA	TBA	26 February 2022

=== Season 3 (2022–2023) ===
No. overall	No. in season	Title	Written by (Note: Episodes in season 3 were written by Tess Meyer, Elise Bradley, and Jeannie Chia. Unlike the first season, the writers are not individually credited for which episodes they wrote.)	Storyboard by (Note: Episodes in season 3 were storyboarded by Cory Mathis, Roii Lee, Vincent James, and Neil Reed. Unlike the first season, the artists are not individually credited for which episodes they storyboarded.)	Original release date
37	1	"The Cracks Are Starting to Show"	TBA	TBA	27 November 2022
38	2	"The Cracks Are Starting to Show"	TBA	TBA	27 November 2022
39	3	"Follow My Lead"	TBA	TBA	4 December 2022
40	4	"Follow My Lead"	TBA	TBA	4 December 2022
41	5	"Brave New World"	TBA	TBA	11 December 2022
42	6	"Brave New World"	TBA	TBA	11 December 2022
43	7	"Little Rats and Big Riddles"	TBA	TBA	18 December 2022
44	8	"Little Rats and Big Riddles"	TBA	TBA	18 December 2022
45	9	"Beasts of Burden"	TBA	TBA	25 December 2022
46	10	"Beasts of Burden"	TBA	TBA	25 December 2022
47	11	"Megashrew Mystery"	TBA	TBA	1 January 2023
48	12	"Megashrew Mystery"	TBA	TBA	1 January 2023
49	13	"The Hunter Returns"	TBA	TBA	8 January 2023
50	14	"The Hunter Returns"	TBA	TBA	8 January 2023
51	15	"The Gateway"	TBA	TBA	15 January 2023
52	16	"The Gateway"	TBA	TBA	15 January 2023
53	17	"Showdown"	TBA	TBA	22 January 2023
54	18	"Showdown"	TBA	TBA	22 January 2023
55	19	"Meltdown"	TBA	TBA	29 January 2023
56	20	"Meltdown"	TBA	TBA	29 January 2023

=== Specials (2020–2025) ===
No.	Title	Written by	Storyboard by	Original release date
Part 1
1	"Welcome to the Wild"	Elise Bradley	Cory Mathis	30 December 2020
Part 2
2	"Wish Upon a Glimmer Fall"	Elise Humphreys	Roii Lee	23 December 2023
3	"The Legend of El Lagarto"	Jeannie Cha	Ryan Chew	16 March 2024
4	"Communication Breakdown"	Elise Humphreys	Roii Lee	30 March 2024
Part 3
5	"Crabby Castaway"	Elise Humphreys	Sally Wongso and Dindamar	31 December 2024
6	"Papua New Dil"	Elise Humphreys	Sally Wongso and Dindamar	1 January 2025
7	"The Eggcentrics"	Chio Su-Ping	Army Rissa and Dindamar	31 March 2025
8	"Turtles and Treasure"	Chio Su-Ping	Sally Wongso	31 March 2025
Part 4
9	"Papa Pangolin"	Elise Humphreys	Roii Lee (Note: Erroneously credited in this special as "Lee-Roii".)	1 May 2025
10	"Animal Police Academy: Monkey Business at Lil Wild"	Chio Su-Ping	Sally Wongso	20 October 2025
11	"Super Dil"	Chio Su-Ping	Sally Wongso	9 August 2025
11	"Lil Paris"	Chio Su-Ping	Sally Wongso	9 August 2025
12	"Survival of the Cutest"	Chio Su-Ping	Sally Wongso	3 October 2025

== Release ==
In the United States, Lil Wild premiered on Kids Street in both English and Spanish on June 7, 2025.

The series was previously available on Netflix in Asia, including Japan, and Australia.

== Reception ==
=== Critical reception ===
Fernanda Camargo of Common Sense Media rated Lil Wild a 3 out of 5 stars, stating that the series is "a great choice for kids who love animal stories and aren't afraid of a bit of adventure", though she argued that the chase scenes and visuals of large weapons may startle toddlers. She wrote that "the show really takes a turn after Season 1, evolving into an engaging story about finding, forming, and protecting family—in all its forms".

=== Accolades ===
Year	Award	Category	Nominee(s) and episode	Result	Ref.
2024	One Voice Awards UK 2024	Animation - Best Character Performance - Male	Paul Delaross	Won	
