= CTSS =

CTSS may refer to:

- Cathepsin S, a human enzyme
- Center for Terrorism & Security Studies at UMass Lowell, US
- Clementi Town Secondary School, Singapore
- Compatible Time-Sharing System, a computer operating system
- Cray Time Sharing System, a computer operating centre
