= Redskin (disambiguation) =

Redskin is a slang term referring to Native Americans in the United States and Canada's First Nations.

Redskin or Redskins may also refer to:

- Washington Redskins, the former name of the NFL team now known as the Washington Commanders
  - Other sports teams named Redskins
- Redskin (film), a 1929 American film
- Redskin (subculture), a marxist or anarchist skinhead
  - The Redskins, a 1980s English band
- Redskins, a candy bar now known as Red Ripperz

== See also ==
- Red skin (disambiguation)
- Potato#Pigmentation, for red-skinned potatoes
- RED People, a Malaysian online supergroup and artist management company
- Allium haematochiton, or redskin onion
