= Lil Wild: In the Big City =

- Genre: Adventure; Comedy
- Based on: Lil Wild by Sapna Angural, Barry Toa, and Nicholas Oh
- Developed by: Leslie Lee
- Directed by: Bill Speers
- Voices of: Heather Beaman; Cody Alexander; Nick Sheculski; Margaret Brock; Rocco Lorito
- Countries of origin: Singapore; Canada
- Original language: English
- No. of seasons: 1
- No. of episodes: 4

Production
- Executive producers: Barry Toa; Seng Choon Meng; Leslie Lee (consultant)
- Producers: Wong Chi Kong; Rick Moh; Tia Menich
- Running time: 11 minutes
- Production companies: Scrawl Animation; Industrial Brothers

Original release
- Network: mewatch; YouTube
- Release: 11 September 2026 – present

Related
- Lil Wild

Lil Wild: In the Big City is a Singaporean-Canadian computer-animated children's television series developed by Leslie Lee. Produced by Scrawl Animation and Industrial Brothers, it is a spin-off and a soft reboot of the Mediacorp original series, Lil Wild (2020–2023).

The series started releasing on both mewatch and the official Lil Wild YouTube channel on 11 September 2026. It then premiered on Mediacorp 5 in Singapore on 25 September, with new premieres occurring every Friday.

== Plot ==
Lil Wild: In the Big City follows the misadventures of the same five animal best friends from the original series: Rara, Wobi, Meep, Dil, and Kokeko. With their human friend Suzie, a ranger that can speak to animals, they have since moved from their home in Lil Wild Park to the Big Wild City, a bustling, modern downtown integrated with jungle trees and greenery. The unlikely crew navigate everyday challenges and embark on adventures in the new environment.

== Voice cast ==
- Heather Beaman as Rara, a female elephant
- Cody Alexander as Wobi, a male Chinese alligator
- Rocco Lorito as Meep, a male white tiger
- Margaret Brock as Kokeko, a female otter
- Nick Sheculski as Dil, a male blue crow pigeon

== Production ==
In October 2024, Barry Toa at Mediacorp approached Leslie Lee with an opportunity to develop a reboot of the animated preschool series, Lil Wild. Lee would come up with a pitch of how she envisioned the characters and show for a new generation of children, intending to flesh out the new world the characters would be living in. The series was officially announced by Mediacorp on 3 December 2025, and was set for a fall 2026 release.

In the Big City is produced by Scrawl Animation, who had previously worked on the Let's Get Wild! and Wild Questions! minisode shorts for the original series. Toronto-based Industrial Brothers also assisted with production services, while Helsinki-based Anima Vitae animated the series. The series is slated for 52 11-minute episodes.

== Episodes ==
No.	Title	Written by	Original release date
1	"Lil Wild in the Big City"	Caitlin Langelier	11 September 2026 (meWATCH/YouTube); 25 September 2026 (TV)
2	"No Sleep Meep"	Taylor Annisette	18 September 2026 (meWATCH/YouTube); 2 October 2026 (TV)
3	"Monkey See, Monkey Take"	Caitlin Langelier	25 September 2026 (meWATCH/YouTube); 9 October 2026 (TV)
4	"The New Neighbour"	Caitlin Langelier	2 October 2026 (meWATCH/YouTube)
