= 3688 =

- Theatrical release poster
- 想入飛飛
- Directed by: Royston Tan
- Written by: Wei Lim (Lim Fong Wei 林方伟)
- Produced by: Melvin Ang; Royston Tan; Bert Tan; Zheng Le; Ng Say Yong; Karen Khoo; Soo Wei Toong
- Starring: Joi Chua; Liu Lingling; Rahimah Rahim; Brandon Wong; Shigga Shay; Michael Tan
- Cinematography: Daniel Low
- Edited by: Neo Rui Xin
- Music by: Don Richmond
- Production companies: Chuan Pictures mm2 Entertainment
- Distributed by: mm2 Entertainment; Golden Village Pictures
- Release date: September 17, 2015
- Running time: 100 minutes
- Country: Singapore
- Languages: Mandarin; Hokkien; Bahasa; English
- Budget: S$1.2 million
- Box office: US$330,980

3688 (simplified Chinese: 想入飞飞; traditional Chinese: 想入飛飛; pinyin: Xiǎngrù Fēifēi, literally "Dreaming of Fei Fei"), is a 2015 Singaporean musical/comedy film directed by Royston Tan and starring Joi Chua, Michael Tan, Rahimah Rahim, Liu Lingling and Shigga Shay. It is Tan's first feature film after an absence of 7 years.

== Plot ==
Xia Fei Fei is a 38-year-old parking attendant, locally known as "summon auntie", or "Feng Fei Fei", who has often dreamed of becoming a singer like her idol, Feng Fei-fei since during her school days, and had won many contests singing Feng's songs during her school days. She is good-natured, and would often give each driver a chance before issuing a ticket. She is well-loved by the drivers, but detested by her colleagues, especially the veteran Jenny and her group of minions who often scheme and plot against her. With her mother long gone, Fei Fei and her father, a retired Rediffusion sales representative, nicknamed "Uncle Radio", live a codependent life together.

At the same time, she has to deal with several other concerns, including supporting her dementia-stricken father-salesman. Fei Fei is aided by kopitiam drink-stall owner Ah Luan, who has an alter-ego, Lady Kaka (a reference to Lady Gaga), and childhood friend and taxi driver Mao Shan. When news of Feng Fei Fei's passing broke, Fei Fei also finds something amiss with her father when he became visibly frustrated over the Rediffusion set's malfunction. It is common knowledge that Rediffusion had been long gone.

In order to take care of her father and cover his rising medical expenses, Fei Fei decides to join the National Singing Competition while coming across an audition. Fei Fei eventually makes it to the finals after capturing the nation's heart with her voice and sincerity.

In a post-credits scene, Fei Fei has finally found her father while he was wandering in an electronics store; as they eat breakfast together, the Rediffusion set begins to play.

== Cast ==
- Joi Chua as Xia Fei Fei
  - Lee Pei Fen as teenage Xia Fei Fei
- Michael Tan as "Uncle Radio"
- Rahimah Rahim as Jenny Rahimah
- Liu Lingling as Ah Luan "Auntie Hai Xian"/Lady Kaka
- Shigga Shay as Yoyo "Hai Er", Ah Luan's son
- Brandon Wong as Maoshan
- Jerry Huang as Fei Xiang, Fei Fei's ex-lover
- Pamelyn Chee as Teresa, one of The Four Beauties / J4 (Jenny's 4)
- Tracy & Teresa from Babes as Ya Ping and Shu Rong, two of The Four Beauties / J4 (Jenny's 4)
- Tay Sia Yeun as Piao Piao, one of The Four Beauties / J4 (Jenny's 4)
- Tan Bee Keow as Anita, a contestant in the singing competition

Lin Meijiao stars as the late mother of Fei Fei. Jim Lim, Patricia Mok and Don Richmond appear as the judges in the televised finals of the National Singing Competition. Xie Jiafa also appears as the host of that competition.

== Production ==
Most of the filming was done at Dakota Crescent, a residential area that was built in the 1950s with first-generation HDB flats. In an interview with Royston Tan by The Straits Times, he said that the act of filming a place can help to preserve it, at least in people's memories and so "disappearing fragments of society will not be forgotten", and wanted to shoot there "as this estate would be gone by next year". Another carpark at Queen Street was used for some of the filming. Filming started in November 2014, and lasted for three weeks.

== Soundtrack ==
3688: Original Soundtrack 3688 想入飛飛 (電影原聲帶)

Soundtrack album by Various Artists
- Released: September 15, 2015
- Genre: Soundtrack
- Length: 33:23
- Labels: Chuan Pictures, mm2 Entertainment

The soundtrack for 3688 was released on all platforms on 15 September 2015, two days before the release of the film.

The theme song of the film is 《念》, sung by Joi Chua. Within a few weeks, it has made its way to one of the top 10 songs on YES 933's weekly charts.

Another song, "Tapau", features Shigga Shay rapping out a list of drinks ordered at coffee-shops. The music video was uploaded on YouTube on 9 August 2015. Shigga also recorded a one-minute rap on the life and career of Feng Fei-fei. The film marks the first time Shigga raps in Mandarin.

Some of the songs in the film are remakes of popular songs from the 1970s and 1980s, especially those originally sung by Feng Fei-fei.

No.	Title	Lyrics	Music	Artist(s)	Length
1.	"Knock On The Door / Coincidence (Medley)" (敲敲門 / 巧合 feat. Rahimah Rahim, The Babes, Pamelyn Chee & Tay Sia Yeun)	Liu Chia-chang, Zhuang Nu	Liu Chia-chang, Tang Ni	Joi Chua	2:39
2.	"I am a Cloud" (我是一片雲)	Chiung Yao	Zuo Hongyuan	Joi Chua	1:22
3.	"Fly to the Rainbow" (奔向彩虹)	Chiung Yao	Gu Yue	Lee Pei Fen	2:04
4.	"Hoa-Hi Tioh Ho (Summon Auntie Version)" (歡喜就好)	Wu Jiaxiang	Wu Jiaxiang	Liu Lingling	1:18
5.	"Applause" (掌聲響起)	Chen Guifen	Chen Jinxing	Joi Chua	4:09
6.	"Darling" (心肝寶貝)	Li Kuncheng, Lo Ta-yu	Lo Ta-yu	Joi Chua	3:16
7.	"Break The Iceberg" (將冰山劈開)	Peter Lai	Michael Cretu, Hubert Kemmler	Tan Bee Keow	0:56
8.	"Sio Bak Chang" (燒肉粽)	Zhang Qiu-dong Song	Zhang Qiu-dong Song	Liu Lingling	2:08
9.	"Woman Flower" (女人花)	Preston Lee	Ricky Ho	Tan Bee Keow	1:49
10.	"念"	Johnson Ong	张玫洁	Joi Chua	4:20
11.	"Tapau" (打包)	Shigga Shay		Shigga Shay	2:30
12.	"念 (Instrumental)"		张玫洁		4:21
13.	"Tapau (Instrumental)" (打包)				2:31
Total length:					33:23

== Reception ==
John Lui of The Straits Times gave 3688 3.5/5 stars, stating that although "Tan's forte is detail and mood" and that there is "sparkle and heart", he needs "fresher ways to express his vision". Furthermore, there is a "lack of narrative discipline", and "motifs are repeated ad nauseam, skits are inserted willy-nilly and music sequences serve neither character or story".

== Box office ==
3688 collected S$191,000 between 17 and 20 September, topping the opening weekend box office chart for a Singaporean film released outside Chinese New Year, however it was surpassed by Mr. Unbelievable in December 2015.
