= Temasek Secondary School =

- 淡马锡中学; Sekolah Menengah Temasek

Location
- 600 Upper East Coast Road; East Coast; Singapore
- Coordinates: 1.3162°N 103.9470°E

Information
- Type: Autonomous; Government; Co-educational
- Motto: We Care
- Founded: 1980
- Session: Single session
- School code: 3030
- Principal: Tan Shun Loong
- Enrolment: 1120
- Colour: Navy Blue Red Gold
- Nickname: Temasekians
- Website: www.temaseksec.moe.edu.sg

Temasek Secondary School (TMS) is a co-educational government autonomous secondary school in Bedok South, Singapore. Founded in 1980, it offers secondary education leading to the Singapore-Cambridge GCE Ordinary Level or Singapore-Cambridge GCE Normal Level examination.

== History ==
TMS was founded in 1980, sharing a campus with Bedok North Secondary School at Upper Changi Road. In 1995, the school attained autonomy, and in March 1999, it moved to its current campus at Upper East Coast Road. It was ranked at all-time high 16th place among all secondary schools in 2000.

== Academic information ==
Being a government secondary school, TMS offers three academic streams, namely the four-year Express course, as well as the Normal Course, comprising Normal Academic and Normal Technical academic tracks.

=== O Level Express Course ===
The Express Course is a nationwide four-year programme that leads up to the Singapore-Cambridge GCE Ordinary Level examination.

==== Academic subjects ====
The examinable academic subjects for Singapore-Cambridge GCE Ordinary Level offered by the school for upper secondary level (via. streaming in secondary 2 level), as of 2017, are listed below.

Notes:

1. Subjects indicated with ' * ' are mandatory subjects.
2. All students in Singapore are required to undertake a Mother Tongue Language as an examinable subject, as indicated by ' ^ '.
3. "SPA" in Pure Science subjects refers to the incorporation of School-based Science Practical Assessment, which 20% of the subject result in the national examination are determined by school-based practical examinations, supervised by the Singapore Examinations and Assessment Board. The SPA Assessment has been replaced by one Practical Assessment in the 2018 O Levels.

Sciences	Language & Humanities	Arts & Aesthetics
Additional Mathematics*; Mathematics*; Physics (SPA); Chemistry (SPA)*; Biology (SPA); Science (Combined)	English Language*; English Literature; Mother Tongue Language* ^; Higher Mother Tongue Language; Geography; History; Combined Humanities (Social Studies & another Humanities subject at elective level)*	Art; Design & Technology; Food & Nutrition; Music; Economics (OSIE); Computing

=== Normal Course ===
The Normal Course is a nationwide 4-year programme leading to the Singapore-Cambridge GCE Normal Level examination, which runs either the Normal Academic curriculum or Normal Technical curriculum, abbreviated as NA and NT respectively.

==== Normal Academic Course ====
In the Normal Academic course, students offer 5-8 subjects in the Singapore-Cambridge GCE Normal Level examination. Compulsory subjects include:

- English Language
- Mother Tongue Language
- Mathematics
- Combined Humanities

A 5th year leading to the Singapore-Cambridge GCE Ordinary Level examination is available to N(A) students who perform well in their Singapore-Cambridge GCE Normal Level examination. Students can move from one course to another based on their performance and the assessment of the school principal and teachers.

==== Normal Technical Course ====
The Normal Technical course prepares students for a technical-vocational education at the Institute of Technical Education. Students will offer 5-7 subjects in the Singapore-Cambridge GCE Normal Level examination. The curriculum is tailored towards strengthening students’ proficiency in English and Mathematics. Students take English Language, Mathematics, Basic Mother Tongue and Computer Applications as compulsory subjects.

== Notable alumni ==
- HubbaBubbas, post-acoustic trio
- Ivy Lee, former actress
- Joanne Peh, actress
- Fann Wong, actress
- Wong Li-Lin, former actress and television presenter
