= Shigga Shay =

Singaporean hip hop artist

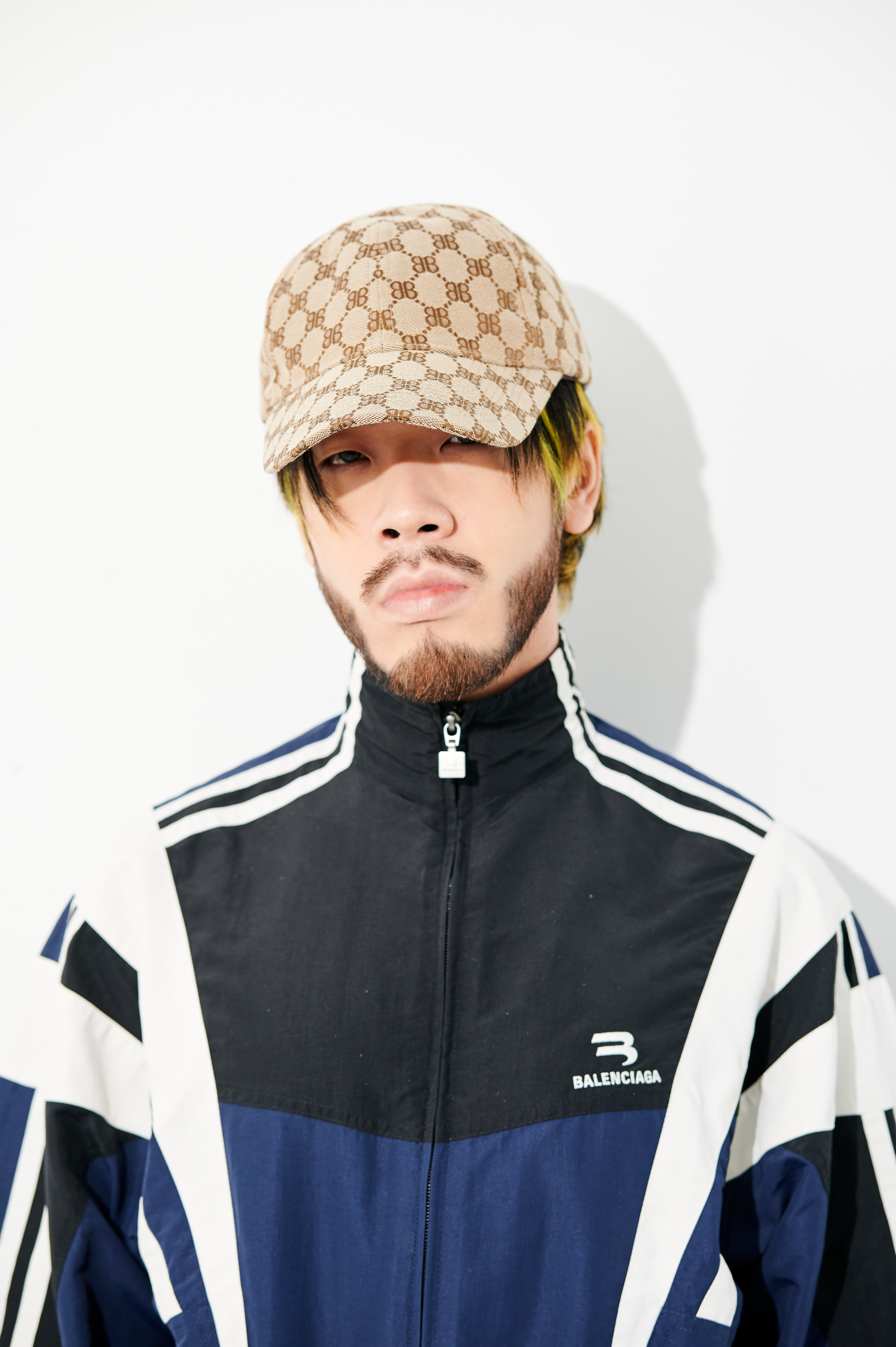
- Shay in 2022

Background information
- Born: 12 September 1992 (age 34); Singapore
- Genre: Hip hop
- Occupations: Rapper; songwriter; producer; director
- Website: http://www.shiggashay.com

Pek Jin Shen (Note: Chinese: 白敬生; pinyin: Bái Jìngshēng) (born 12 September 1992), better known by his stage name Shigga Shay (stylised as ShiGGa Shay—the capitalised "GG" representing "Grizzle Grind"), is a Singaporean hip hop artist, songwriter, director and music producer. ShiGGa Shay was recognised as the "Unsigned Talent of The Week" by WorldStarHipHop at 17 and secured multiple #1 singles on the iTunes Singapore Charts. Furthermore, he was invited to perform at the White House Afterparty for the State Dinner in Washington, DC.

In 2023, Shay became the first Singaporean and the first artist to perform a song in both Mandarin and Hokkien on COLORSxSTUDIOS. In the same year, he was invited to perform as a special guest on "The Rap Of China", alongside rapper E.SO, making him the first Southeast Asian to be invited on the show.

Shay is also a founding member of hip hop group Grizzle Grind Crew, as well as production company Grizzle Films.

== Early life and education ==
Pek Jin Shen was born on 12 September 1992 in Singapore. He developed his interest in hip-hop music and rapping at the age of nine, after his mother purchased him a few English hip hop records. Pek's father died in 2009 of colon cancer.

His passion for music began at a young age, when he joined the Chinese Orchestra and began playing the dizi at Henry Park Primary School. He joined the Queensway Secondary School military band, where he played the trombone. Following secondary school, he graduated from Singapore Polytechnic with a diploma in media and communications.

== Career ==
=== 2010s: Early beginnings, LimPeh and impact on local culture ===
ShiGGa Shay is an onomatopoeic play on the Chinese words, "是个谁" from "你是个谁," which translates to mean "who is it" or "who are you".

Shay made his national television debut on Live N Loaded on MediaCorp as a 16-year-old, which was one of his early public performances. He discussed how his initial appearance on public television inspired him to perform more in an interview with Mothership. He was approached by Dr. Sydney Tan, the National Day Parade's music director that year and Don Richmond when he was 17 years old, to take part in the parade for the first time. That same year, he released his mixtape ShiGGa Shay's in the Building (2010), and They Call Me ShiGGa (2012) was an album that dropped soon after. ShiGGa Shay's in the Building was reportedly recorded solely in Shigga's bedroom.

On 16 December 2012, ShiGGa was named the "Unsigned Talent of The Week" by WorldStarHipHop. ShiGGa is the "youngest hip-hop artist to have made it on the Singapore radio charts [...]", according to Aging Youth.

He released the English-Chinese-Hokkien rap song "LimPeh" (English: Your Dad) in June 2013, and it quickly rose to the top of the Singaporean charts. It features guest vocals from Tosh Rock and Wang Weiliang. The accompanying music video was one of the first from the local music industry to go viral.

During his two-year compulsory National Service, he was a member of the SAF Music & Drama Company (MDC). In his interview with COLORSxSTUDIOS, Shay shared how his experience in MDC sharpened him as he became more familiar with performing on stage. He was given the opportunity to host, rap, act and dance - performing over 600 shows in different army camps. He said in an interview with The Straits Times, "Before MDC, I was just a rapper but my time there made me an all-round performer,"

During this time he performed for the Ah Boys to Men musical, Rockhampton and the MDC 40th anniversary alongside other MDC alumni: Jack Neo, Dick Lee, JJ Lin, Jeremy Monterio and more. In the years that followed, he released several singles, Lion City Kia (2014), ShiGGa Morning (2015) and the official theme song for 3688, Tapau (2015).

In 2015 Shay released his first full-length self-titled album. In 2015, he was part of Sing50 concert and performed in the hip-hop segment with Apl.de.ap from the Black Eyed Peas. During that year he also collaborated with Dick Lee during this performance. He was also part of the SG50 album, "Sing, Love", where he collaborated with Stefanie Sun in a duet titled "Simply Love" which they also performed live during the albums showcase. In 2017, Shay was also featured on Stefanie Sun's album on the song "Levitate (漂浮群岛)".

In August 2016, Shay performed at the White House state dinner after-party. He was invited to perform by the US Ambassador to Singapore, Kirk Wagar.

Recognised for his stage presence, Shay has opened for esteemed hip-hop legends, including Wu-Tang Clan, and shared the stage with cultural influencer Jaden Smith during the Singapore leg of his World Tour. He has performed at several prominent events including Singapore's National Day Parade, performing on five different years, Singapore Day, Ultra Singapore, and the Formula 1 Singapore Grand Prix Concert.

=== 2020 - 2022: $S, uRight and I AM U ===
In 2020, he dropped a 12-track mixtape, S$.

Shay has also experienced considerable commercial success on an international scale. In 2021, he released 'uRight', a transformative collaboration with Korean-American rapper Jay Park. This release coincided with his inaugural collaboration with Hugo Boss, where he curated a capsule collection exclusively available in Singapore.

In 2022, he released an EP titled I AM U. The 5-track EP features previously released singles in "uRight" which notably features South Korean rapper Jay Park. 'Mercury' featuring Taiwanese-American rapper ØZI, 'Birthday', 'uKnow' and 'Passive Aggressive'. The track 'Mercury' was produced by London-based producer JB Made It, who has production credits for Drake, Fivo Foreign, and Chief Keef.

=== 2023 – present: COLORS Studios and Rap of China ===
In April 2023, he became the first Singaporean artist to perform at COLORSxSTUDIOS and was also the first to perform a song in both Mandarin and Hokkien.

In that same month, Shay was featured in "Gummy Yummy", a multilingual single released by Thai Rapper, F.Hero. It also features Thai artist JV.Jarvis and Japan's JP The Wavy.

In June 2023, he was invited to perform as a special guest alongside rapper E.SO on "The Rap Of China", which stands as one of China's most popular variety show produced by iQiyi. On that episode, the duo debuted their single "BO BEH ZAO" (Hokkien for "No Horse Run" 没⻢跑). He participated in the next season of the show in 2024 as a competitor.

== Artistry and influences ==
Shay's upbringing in Singapore and his reflections of his environment form the basis of his creative output. This is shown in the multilingualism and colloquialism frequently used in his songs. The Notorious B.I.G., 2Pac, Eminem, Dr. Dre, Snoop Dogg, Jay-Z and Nas are among the musicians he cites as influencers.

=== Music videos ===
Through his production company, Grizzle Films, ShiGGa Shay not only directs his own music videos but also directed multiple music videos such as the Starhub Chinese New year Commercial 2014 "Wang Ah!" as well as the Singapore version of the Durex-MTV global sex-ed campaign "Somebody like me" that featured The Sam Willows. He also directed the music video for the song 我们的故事 of Jack Neo's movie, The Lion Men.

In 2023, Shay directed the music video for the theme song of NDP 2023, "Shine Your Light" which he co-wrote the lyrics with Don Richmond.

=== Venturing beyond music ===
Shay holds the distinction of being the sole Asian music artist selected for HUGO's 2021 global music campaign, HUGO Louder, joining esteemed artists such as Rejjie Snow, Amelie Lens and MØ.

In 2020 in the midst of the pandemic, he became the first Southeast Asian artist to host a live streaming Mixed Reality concert. The concert was broadcast on cable TV via TechStorm in Asia.

In April 2022 Shay become the first Southeast Asian music artist to sell out his genesis Non-Fungible Token (NFT) within a span of four minutes, marking his entry into the Web 3.0 space.

In 2023, Shay performed at the opening ceremony of The International Olympic Committee (IOC)'s first Olympic Esports Week Singapore 2023.

== Discography ==
=== Studio albums ===
| Title | Album details | Track listing |
|---|---|---|
| ShiGGa Shay | Released: 9 August 2015 | 1. "Never Learn"; 2. "Lion City Kia feat. Akeem Jahat and Lineath"; 3. "Siala feat. Wang Weiliang"; 4. "Lonely"; 5. "Wussapa"; 6. "Ang Moh Pai feat. Tosh Rock"; 7. "Everybody"; 8. "Mama Don't Cry" |
| S$ | Released: 19 June 2020 | 1. "White House"; 2. "Waking Up"; 3. "Reason Why"; 4. "Too Sunny Freestyle"; 5. "Handbag"; 6. "Merry Go"; 7. "Standby Freestyle"; 8. "If I,"; 9. "$ing Dolla"; 10. "Don't Talk 2 Me"; 11. "No Sound" |

=== Extended plays ===
| Title | Album details | Track listing |
|---|---|---|
| They Call Me ShiGGa | Released: 1 January 2012 | 1. "Moon Talk"; 2. "Let's Roll"; 3. "Gravity"; 4. "Vee's Interlude feat. Vanessa Fernandez"; 5. "Rock My World feat. Vanessa Fernandez"; 6. "What's My Name (Voicemail)"; 7. "ShiGGa ShiGGa"; 8. "Break Me feat. Muzique"; 9. "Echoes feat. Sylvia Ratonel"; 10. "Echoes (Clean Version) feat. Sylvia Ratonel" |
| I AM U | Released: 21 April 2022 | 1. "uRight (feat. Jay Park)"; 2. "Mercury (feat. ØZI)"; 3. "Passive Aggressive"; 4. "Birthday"; 5. "uKnow" |

=== Singles ===
==== As lead artist ====
| Title | Year | Album |
|---|---|---|
| "Lim Peh feat. Tosh Rock" | 2013 | Non-album single |
| "Lion City Kia" | 2014 | ShiGGa Shay |
| "Wussapa" | 2015 | ShiGGa Shay |
| "Tapau (From 3688)" | 2015 | Non-album single |
| "Last Warning feat. Tosh Rock, Wang Weiliang, LINEATH, Fakkah Fuzz, Charles ENERO" | 2016 | Non-album single |
| "In My Hand" | 2016 | Non-album single |
| "Paiseh" | 2019 | Non-album single |
| "if, i" | 2019 | S$ |
| "Leh Loh" | 2020 | S$ |
| "Reason Why" | 2020 | S$ |
| "365 the Intro" | 2020 | Non-album single |
| "who r u 是个谁" | 2020 | Non-album single |
| "uRight (feat. Jay Park)" | 2021 | I AM U |
| "Passive Aggressive" | 2021 | I AM U |
| "uTopia reimagined: chasing feat. Aisyah Aziz" | 2021 | Non-album single |
| "iykyk (uKnow remix) ft. Cykko" | 2022 | I AM U (iykyk edition) |
| "Rainy Days - A COLORS SHOW" | 2023 | Non-album single |

==== As featured artist ====
| Title | Year | Album |
|---|---|---|
| DOMO feat. [ShiGGa Shay, SonaOne & JP THE WAVY] | 2019 | Non-album single |
| GUMMY YUMMY [F.Hero, JV.JARVIS, ShiGGa Shay & JP THE WAVY] | 2023 | Non-album single |
| Game On (Yan Ting, SHIGGA SHAY) | 2025 | Non-album single |

=== Music videos ===
| Title | Year |
|---|---|
| "Break Me (ft. Muzique)" | 2012 |
| "Lion City Kia (Ft. LINEATH, Akeem Jahat)" | 2014 |
| "Grizzle Grind Anthem (Ft. ShiGGa Shay, LINEATH, Charles Enero & Tosh Rock)" | 2014 |
| "Born Hater Freestyle (feat. Charles ENERO & THELIONCITYBOY)" | 2015 |
| "ShiGGa Morning (ft. Inch Chua)" | 2015 |
| "EVERYBODY" | 2015 |
| "Tapau (From the "3688" Movie OST)" | 2015 |
| "Ang Moh Pai (ft. Tosh Rock)" | 2015 |
| "Never Learn" | 2015 |
| "Paiseh" | 2019 |
| "if i", | 2019 |
| "주니어셰프 (JuniorChef) - 'DOMO (Feat. ShiGGa Shay, SonaOne & JP THE WAVY)" | 2019 |
| "Leh Loh (Visualizer)" | 2020 |
| "Reason Why (Lyric Video)" | 2020 |
| "Waking Up (Lyric Video)" | 2020 |
| "No Sound (Lyric Visualizer)" | 2020 |
| "who r u 是个谁 (Mixed Reality Music Video)" | 2020 |
| "Reason Why (Live XR Studio Performance)" | 2021 |
| "uRight (feat. Jay Park)" | 2021 |
| "Passive Aggressive" | 2021 |
| "uTopia reimagined: chasing feat. Aisyah Aziz (Lyric Video)" | 2021 |
| "Mercury (feat. ØZI) (Visualizer)" | 2022 |
| "iykyk (uKnow remix) ft. Cykko" | 2022 |

== Filmography ==
=== Movies ===
| Year | Title | Role | Notes |
|---|---|---|---|
| 2015 | 3688 想入飞飞 | Yoyo | This movie's opening weekend was recorded as the highest opening weekend for a local film in 2015 |

=== Series ===
| Year | Title | Role | Notes |
|---|---|---|---|
| 2020 | Lil Wild | Kwong | First voice over role. |

=== Music video appearances ===
| Year | Song | Artist |
|---|---|---|
| 2016 | One of These Days | MICappella |
| 2023 | Rainy Days - A COLORS SHOW | COLORSxSTUDIOS |
| 2023 | GUMMY YUMMY | F.Hero, JV.Jarvis, ShiGGa Shay, JP THE WAVY |

== See also ==
- Sylvia Ratonel
- Inch Chua
- The Sam Willows
- Gentle Bones
- Tabitha Nauser
- Jay Park
