= Fakkah Fuzz =

Singaporean comedian (born 1986)

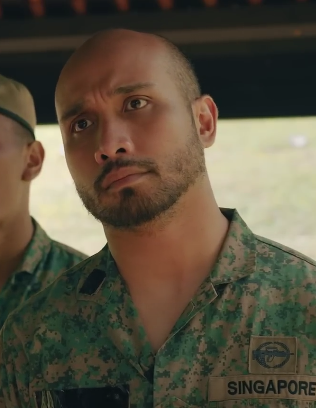
- Fadzri in 2022
- Born: Muhammad Fadzri Abdul Rashid; 19 September 1986 (age 40); Singapore
- Occupation: Comedian

Muhammad Fadzri Abdul Rashid (born 19 September 1986), professionally known as Fakkah Fuzz, is a Singaporean stand-up comedian and television personality.

On 26 January 2018, his Netflix stand-up comedy special Almost Banned was released worldwide.

== Early life and career ==
Fadzri was born on 19 September 1986 in Singapore and had his secondary education in Malaysia and did his Sijil Pelajaran Malaysia. He went back to Singapore and did his National Service.

He had previously worked as a waiter for Paddock Club before working at Far East Plaza as a cleaner. He later formed a band and would talk to the audience in between songs, eventually hosting events for local bands. He later worked at a stand-up comedy venue after realising that he had a talent for stand-up.

== Stand-up career ==
In 2016, Fadzri was criticized for a joke he made about Malaysia's Prime Minister, then-Najib Razak, comparing him to a thief. Fadzri apologized for the joke. He also joined hip-hop collective Grizzle Grind Crew, founded by ShiGGa Shay, and was featured in one of his songs.

On 26 January 2018, his Netflix stand-up comedy special Almost Banned was released worldwide, becoming the first Singaporean to have a Netflix stand-up special. In 2023, he released his second comedy special, Too Real, also on Netflix.

In 2024, Fadzri went on a tour in Melbourne, Australia. He held a show on 3 August at the Esplanade Theatre and performed under Fadzri Rashid, stating that he would be retiring the stage name Fakkah Fuzz.
