= Joi Chua =

Singaporean singer (born 1978)

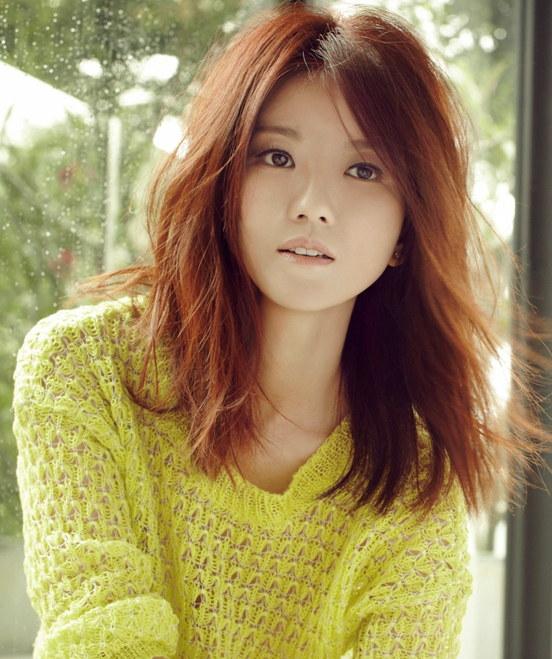
- Photo shoot for EP Perspectives in 2012
- Born: 3 August 1978 (age 48); Singapore
- Education: Raffles Girls' Primary School; Clementi Town Secondary School; Singapore Polytechnic
- Occupations: Singer; songwriter; actress; entrepreneur
- Years active: 1996–present
- Spouse: Jack Chan (m. 2009)
- Musical career
- Genres: Pop; folk
- Labels: Ocean Butterflies; Warner Music Singapore; Joi Music; DP Music; Channy Dynasty

Chinese name
- Chinese: 蔡淳佳
- Hanyu Pinyin: Cài Chúnjiā
- Hokkien POJ: Chòa Sûn-ka
- Website: joichua.com

Joi Chua Choon Kah (born 3 August 1978) is a Singaporean singer, songwriter, actress and entrepreneur. She is known for the hits "Waiting for a Sunny Day" (等一个晴天), "One Day I Will" (有一天我會), and "Watching the Sunrise With Me" (陪我看日出), a Mandarin cover of "Namida Sousou".

== Early life ==
Chua attended Raffles Girls' Primary School and Clementi Town Secondary School. She graduated from Singapore Polytechnic, majoring in optometry. Originally majoring in business administration, she shifted her major to optometry 3 months later into the course. She was influenced by her elder brother to pick up singing from a young age. She joined and led the choir in her secondary school and later joined budding singers in The Ark, a café with live performances, which molded the most important part of Chua's singing career. Her mother died when she was 19. Both her mother and one of her aunts died from breast cancer.

== Career ==
Chua debuted as a commercial singer in 1996 in "Extraordinary Singers Course" organized by Ocean Butterflies Production Company, where she was chosen from over 2,000 candidates at its premiere audition to join the label as a trainee singer. Her first album under the same name, was however only launched in 2000 as she decided to complete her education before embarking on her singing career. The album did not receive its desired response, and Chua returned to the hospital to work as an optometrist between 2001 and 2003 after her short stint.

Chua released her second album Sunrise (日出) with Play Music in 2003. This album helped her pick up the merit award under the cultural achievement category for The Outstanding Young Person Award for 2006. Play Music was later acquired by Warner Music and Chua came under the wings of the global music label till 2010 before switching to her own management.

Chua was later commissioned by Mediacorp to sing many Channel 8 NKF Drama Series theme songs and the sub-theme songs like There is Hope for Life (梦在手里), and she also performed at the Singapore National Day Parade in 2005 and 2008. She also led the music Craze Concert in 2005, 2006 and was the anchor performer for Chingay Parade 2012.

Chua started her own music label "Joi Music" and produced her latest EP, Perspectives in 2012.

In China, Chua sang at the CCTV big annual show Mid-Autumn Festival Gala Evening (中秋晚会) in 2007 2008 and 2014.

She starred in Royston Tan's 3688 in 2015.

On 29 November 2019, Chua held her first solo concert in Singapore, titled Joi Chua Flow Concert, at the Suntec Convention and Exhibition Centre.

== Business venture ==
Trained as an optometrist, Chua started her own optical practice Eyecare People in Holland Village in 2011, which later moved to Royal Square Medical Centre in Novena in 2019.

== Social causes ==
Chua was appointed the ambassador for the Singapore Speak Mandarin Campaign 2005 which involved her in concerts held in 12 primary and secondary schools to promote the campaign. She performed the Chinese theme song of Uniquely You (非常特别的你), as part of Singapore Tourism Board's campaign to promote Singapore as a choice destination for both locals and foreign travellers. Chua was also appointed an ambassador for World Vision and Mercy Relief.

== Personal life ==
In December 2009, Chua married her boyfriend of 10 years.

== Discography ==
=== Studio albums ===
Released	Chinese title	English title	Label	Notes
2000	蔡淳佳 Joi	Joi Tsai	Sony Music Taiwan	
September 2004	日出	Sunrise		
August 2005	有一天我会	One Day I will	UST	
December 2005	对不起，我爱你	Love is... or Sorry, I love you		Featuring Eric Chen (陈冠宇).
September 2006	等一个晴天	Waiting for a Sunny Day	Warner Music	
November 2006	淳佳精选17首	The Best of Joi	Warner Music	Only released in Taiwan
December 2007	慶幸擁有蔡淳佳	Blessed Joi	Warner Music	
September 2009	回到最初	Back to Basics	Warner Music	
January 2010	淳剧佳曲	Joi Best of Drama	Warner Music	
June 2010	時間的禮盒	The Gift of Time	Warner Music	
July 2012	视界观	Perspectives		Songs were embedded in a promoting USB disk whose pattern was designed by Chua.

=== Singles ===
Released	Chinese title	English title	Label	Notes
April 2014	玻璃	"Glass"		
November 2014	一传一	"Be the One"		Released in English and Mandarin versions
November 2014	信约 (feat. Kelvin Tan)	'"The Journey"		The Journey: Tumultuous Times theme song

== Filmography ==
Year	Title	Role	Notes
2015	3688	Xia Feifei	

== Awards and nominations ==
In 2008, Chua was nominated for Best Female Mandarin Singer in Mandopop industry's most prestigious Golden Melody Awards for the album Joi Blessed (庆幸拥有蔡淳佳). She later went on to win Best Asia-Pacific Vocalist in the Original Chinese Music Awards held in China in 2010 with her album Back to Basics (回到最初). Her co-written work "Darkness" (不透光) from this EP, with prolific composer-producer Jim Lim won her, her first "Best Melody Composition" award in Singapore e-Award in 2012.

Year	Award	Category	Nominated work	Result
2005	Star Awards 2005	Best Theme Song	Destiny	Nominated
2006	Star Awards 2006	Best Theme Song	Rhapsody in Blue	Nominated
2015	Star Awards 2015	Best Theme Song	The Journey: Tumultuous Times	Won
