= Red skin =

Red skin may refer to:

- Flushing (physiology), to temporarily become markedly red in the face or other areas of the skin
- Erythroderma, an inflammatory disease of the skin that causes a red appearance along with scaling
- Erythema, a symptom describing redness of skin or mucous membranes caused by increased blood flow in the superficial capillaries
- Topical steroid withdrawal, also known as red burning skin
- Sunburn, a form of radiation burn that affects living tissue
- Burn, a type of injury to skin, or other tissues

== See also ==
- Redskin (disambiguation)
