= I Know, But Where =

Studio album by The Sam Willows
- Released: July 6, 2018
- Genre: Indie pop
- Label: Sony Music Singapore

The Sam Willows chronology
Take Heart (2015)	I Know, But Where (2018)

Singles from I Know, But Where
- 1. "Keep Me Jealous" Released: May 17, 2017; 2. "Save Myself" Released: August 25, 2017; 3. "Robot" Released: February 13, 2018; 4. "Papa Money" Released: February 13, 2018

I Know, But Where is the second studio album by Singaporean pop band The Sam Willows, released on 6 July 2018 through Sony Music Entertainment Singapore.

== Production ==
Similar to their first album, Take Heart, the band had flown to Sweden with songwriters and producers to work on this album.

== Track listing ==
No.	Title	Length
1.	"Baby Don't Shy"	3:34
2.	"Keep Me Jealous"	3:07
3.	"Lie Like A Lover"	3:12
4.	"Thirsty"	3:22
5.	"Say So"	3:58
6.	"Papa Money"	3:27
7.	"Need Your Number"	3:22
8.	"Save Myself"	3:22
9.	"Robot"	3:21
10.	"Time We Try"	3:58
11.	"Drive"	2:28
Total length:		37:11
