= RED People =

Malaysian management company

- Born: Malaysia
- Years active: 2014 - 2019
- Musical career
- Origin: Malaysia
- Genres: Mandopop, C-pop
- Label: RED People
- Members: See list of members
- Website: Official website

RED People is a Malaysian online supergroup and artist management company founded by rapper-songwriter Namewee. It was established with the aim of integrating the forces of Malaysian online personalities, and prepare them for mainstream media.

== History ==
RED People Artistes started recruiting online personalities with a strong following on YouTube in late 2013 before it was established on January 1, 2014. Its first video, "You're Not Red" (你不紅), was uploaded onto YouTube on March 23, 2014. It rose to fame when Joyce Chu's video for "Malaysia Chabor" was uploaded on May 23, 2014. Following that, a series of videos were uploaded onto YouTube, encompassing a wide range of video types, including another music video for "Sambal Party" (38派對) during the 2014 FIFA World Cup period, RED News, which imitates the news and several videos by its artistes.

In November 2014, RED People created a boy band, P-High, consisting of Charles Tee, Kevin Tan, Jimmy Tan, Wong Xiao Le and Wilbur Ng. Their song, Very Shuai (Very帅), gained over 100,000 views within a day. In December 2014, it launched girl group Amoi-Amoi, composed of May Ng, Stella Chen and Strawberry. Their cover of Chopstick Brothers' "Little Apple", which includes a number of Malaysian fruits, received more than 18,283,900 or more views on YouTube at August 2022.

In January 2015, RED People released their first Chinese New Year album, entitled "Red Red People Red Red Year" (红红年), which included the song "七洞强" as well as some others.

== Works ==
The following are some of the works done by RED People:

=== Surely Sensored (保證馬賽克) ===
A series which talks about 18+ Sexual things, Hosted by 糖糖.

=== RED News (紅人主播) ===
It is a series of videos uploaded on YouTube, which provide updates regarding RED People's artistes in the style of a news broadcast, with Christal Yap, Rumiko, Jimmy Tan, Dato sai and Wong Xiao Le as the news anchors. The first episode was uploaded on August 9, 2014.

=== Fitting Queen (時尚試裝節目) ===
Such videos show female artistes going to several fashion shops to try some of the clothes they sell. The first video was uploaded on October 18, 2014.

=== Kongkam Show ===
In such videos, the artistes compete against each other and challenge themselves to do various activities.

=== Opera ABC ===
It is a musical drama which revolves around a school theme, known as RED School, which began broadcast on November 4, 2014. The Second Series Broadcast On June 8, 2019. It revolve around public theme. The First Series is Called Opera ABC- Just Shuffle, The Second Series is called Opera ABC- Just do it 啪啪啪 with lesser actor.

=== Dato Sai (拿督賽) ===
It is a series of Cantonese-language videos starring Charles Tee together with other artistes.

== Members ==
=== Namewee Production ===
- Namewee 黄明志 (Boss Of Namewee Production)
- Michiyo Ho 何念慈 (Part Of Namewee Production)

=== Amoi-Amoi ===
(A girl band created in December 2014)

- Benny Ong Ee-Teng (Wang Yi-Ting) (ET) 王依渟 (part of Amoi-Amoi)
- May Ng Choi-Mei (Wu Cui-Mei) 吳翠媚 (part of Amoi-Amoi)
- Mays Hong Shao-Qi 洪少琦 (part of Amoi-Amoi)
- Stella Chen Yue-Qing 曾樂晴 (晴晴) (part of Amoi-Amoi)

Former Members

- Strawberry Lin Mei-Yu (林美瑜) (part of Amoi-Amoi since 2014 and graduated on 2016, now a soloist)

=== P-High ===
(A boy band created in November 2014)

- A-vin Yan 炎柏韋 (part of P-HIGH 屁孩)
- Charles Tee 鄭秋寶 (拿督賽, 鄭少) (part of P-HIGH 屁孩)
- Christopher Damart 克利斯 (part of P-HIGH 屁孩)
- Kean Tan 陳德健 (part of P-HIGH 屁孩)
- Kevin Tan 陳健豪 (part of P-HIGH 屁孩)
- Koay 郭建榮 (part of P-HIGH 屁孩)
- Wilbur Ng 黄勁達 (Mr. 達人) (part of P-HIGH 屁孩)
- Wong Xiao Le 王崧了 (小了) (part of P-HIGH 屁孩)
- Jimmy Tan 陳吉米 (part of P-HIGH 屁孩) (2014–2019, deceased) -- former member

=== Others ===
- Christal Yap (Crystal Hishico, Yap Wei Wei) 葉緯煒
- Diorlynn Ong 翁依玲
- Hannya (Shee Su Hui) 寒婭
- Hapii Miiao 凱特玲
- Hishiko 張沁賢
- Joyce Chu 朱主愛 (四葉草)
- Katrina Low 劉韋凌
- MC Fang 朱寶芳 (MC阿芳)
- Michiyo Ho 何念兹 (何戀慈)
- Rumiko (Su Wei) 徐紓薇
- Sean Huang 黃宥翔
- Strawberry Lin Mei-Yu 林美瑜 (草莓) (Amoi-Amoi graduate of 2016)
- Sukie Lai 賴曉琪
- Tammy Ong 王慧瑜
- Yiky Kho 郭筱鹿
- Yuki Lee 陳太

== Criticism ==
RED People's videos have received a number of feedback, including positive and negative ones. In May 2014, Joyce Chu's video for "Malaysia Chabor" spawned a number of parodies and covers, including that of Gary Chun's "Singapore Da Por", which he showed his affection for Chu. Similarly, in June 2014, a video involving Charles Tee mentioning "Bye Malaysia, Redang I am coming" received numerous negative criticism by Facebook fans. A video of him apologizing was uploaded later on.

== Discography ==
=== Extended plays ===
- P-High (by P-High) (2015)
- 四葉草 Joyce Chu (by Joyce Chu) (2015)
- Michiyo 何念茲 (by Michiyo Ho) (2016)
- Merry Cold Christmas 在一起 冷冷 der 聖誕節 (by Joyce Chu) (2016)

=== Chinese New Year Albums ===
- Red Red People Red Red Year 紅紅年 (2015)
- CNY AGAIN ?! 紅紅又來過新年 (2016)

=== Photobook ===
- Abandoned (2015)

=== Singles ===
Year	Title	Album	Label
2014	You're Not Red 你不紅	Non-album single	RED People; AC Music Entertainment; EQ Music
2014	Malaysia Chabor (by Joyce Chu)	四葉草 Joyce Chu	RED People; AC Music Entertainment; EQ Music
2014	Sambal Party 38派對	Non-album single	RED People; AC Music Entertainment; EQ Music
2014	Your Little Round Hand 伸出圓手 (by Joyce Chu)	Non-album single	RED People; AC Music Entertainment; EQ Music
2014	Very Shuai 帥 (by P-High)	P-High	RED People; AC Music Entertainment; EQ Music
2014	Like Me (by Joyce Chu)	Non-album single	RED People; AC Music Entertainment; EQ Music
2014	Little Apple 小蘋果 (by AMOi-AMOi)	Non-album single	RED People; AC Music Entertainment; EQ Music
2014	謝謝你 RED SCHOOL (by Joyce Chu)	Non-album single	RED People; AC Music Entertainment; EQ Music
2015	七洞強 (CNY 2015)	Red Red People Red Red Year 紅紅年; CNY AGAIN ?! 紅紅又來過新年	RED People; AC Music Entertainment; EQ Music
2015	咩咩咩 (你不紅 CNY version)	Red Red People Red Red Year 紅紅年; CNY AGAIN ?! 紅紅又來過新年	RED People; AC Music Entertainment; EQ Music
2015	家裡 Sweet Home (by Joyce Chu)	Red Red People Red Red Year 紅紅年; CNY AGAIN ?! 紅紅又來過新年	RED People; AC Music Entertainment; EQ Music
2015	我好天真我好傻 I Was Naive (by Diorlynn Ong)	Abandoned	RED People; AC Music Entertainment; EQ Music
2015	選擇ABC (by P-High 屁孩)	P-High	RED People; AC Music Entertainment; EQ Music
2015	親愛的肖查某 Xiao Chabor (by P-High 屁孩)	P-High	RED People; AC Music Entertainment; EQ Music
2015	你不要我 Abandoned (by Michiyo Ho & Diorlynn Ong ft. Namewee)	Abandoned; Michiyo 何念兹	RED People; AC Music Entertainment; EQ Music
2015	It's A Long Day (by Joyce Chu)	四葉草 Joyce Chu	RED People; AC Music Entertainment; EQ Music
2015	I Miss U 好想你(by Joyce Chu)	四葉草 Joyce Chu	RED People; AC Music Entertainment; EQ Music
2015	I Miss U 2 好想你2.0(by Namewee ft. Joyce Chu)	Crossover Asia 亞洲通車 (Namewee's album)	RED People; AC Music Entertainment; EQ Music
2015	又要過年 CNY AGAIN ?!	CNY AGAIN ?! 紅紅又來過新年	RED People; AC Music Entertainment; EQ Music
2016	Em nhớ anh 好想你 Vietnamese version (by Joyce Chu)	Non-album single	RED People; AC Music Entertainment; EQ Music
2016	Lựa chọn ABC 選擇ABC Vietnamese version (by P-High)	Non-album single	RED People; AC Music Entertainment; EQ Music
2016	Poor Love Song 負二代(by P-High ft. Namewee)	Crossover Asia 亞洲通車 (Namewee's album)	RED People; AC Music Entertainment; EQ Music
2016	Love You No More (by Michiyo Ho ft. Fatdoo & Namewee)	Michiyo 何念兹	RED People; AC Music Entertainment; EQ Music
2016	Together 在一起(by Joyce Chu ft. Namewee)	Merry Cold Christmas 在一起 冷冷 der 聖誕節	RED People; AC Music Entertainment; EQ Music
2016	Add Oil! 一起加油！(by AMOi-AMOi)	Non-album single	RED People; AC Music Entertainment; EQ Music
2016	Water! 打功夫! (by Joyce Chu ft. Namewee)	Non-album single	RED People; AC Music Entertainment; EQ Music
2016	咪咪MIMI (by Michiyo Ho ft. MC Fang)	Michiyo 何念兹	RED People; AC Music Entertainment; EQ Music
2016	男神請舉手! HANDS UP HANDSOME (by Michiyo Ho ft. Jack Lim & Danny Koo)	Michiyo 何念兹	RED People; AC Music Entertainment; EQ Music
2016	Merry Cold Christmas 冷冷 der 聖誕節 (by Joyce Chu)	Merry Cold Christmas 在一起 冷冷 der 聖誕節	RED People; AC Music Entertainment; EQ Music
2016	Rich Hot Chicks 公雞八宅(by AMOi-AMOi)	Non-album single	RED People; AC Music Entertainment; EQ Music
2017	新年新男友! (by Michiyo Ho)	Non-album single	RED People; AC Music Entertainment; EQ Music
2017	Mambo Island 新寶島曼波 (by Joyce Chu)	Non-album single	RED People; AC Music Entertainment; EQ Music
