= The Sam Willows (EP) =

EP by The Sam Willows
- Released: November 12, 2012
- Genre: Indie pop
- Length: 17:08
- Language: English
- Label: Sony Music Singapore

The Sam Willows chronology
The Sam Willows (2012)	Take Heart (2015)

The Sam Willows is an extended play by Singaporean pop band The Sam Willows, released on 12 November 2012 through Sony Music Entertainment Singapore.

== Release ==
On 12 November 2012, the band released their first extended play and made their international debut in 2013 at the annual South by Southwest music festival in Texas.

== Track listing ==
No.	Title	Length
1.	"Crown"	1:55
2.	"Crimson"	3:45
3.	"Coming Train"	3:44
4.	"Glasshouse"	4:16
5.	"Nightlight"	5:20
Total length:		17:08
