= Joyce Chu =

Malaysian singer and actress (born 1997)

- 朱主爱
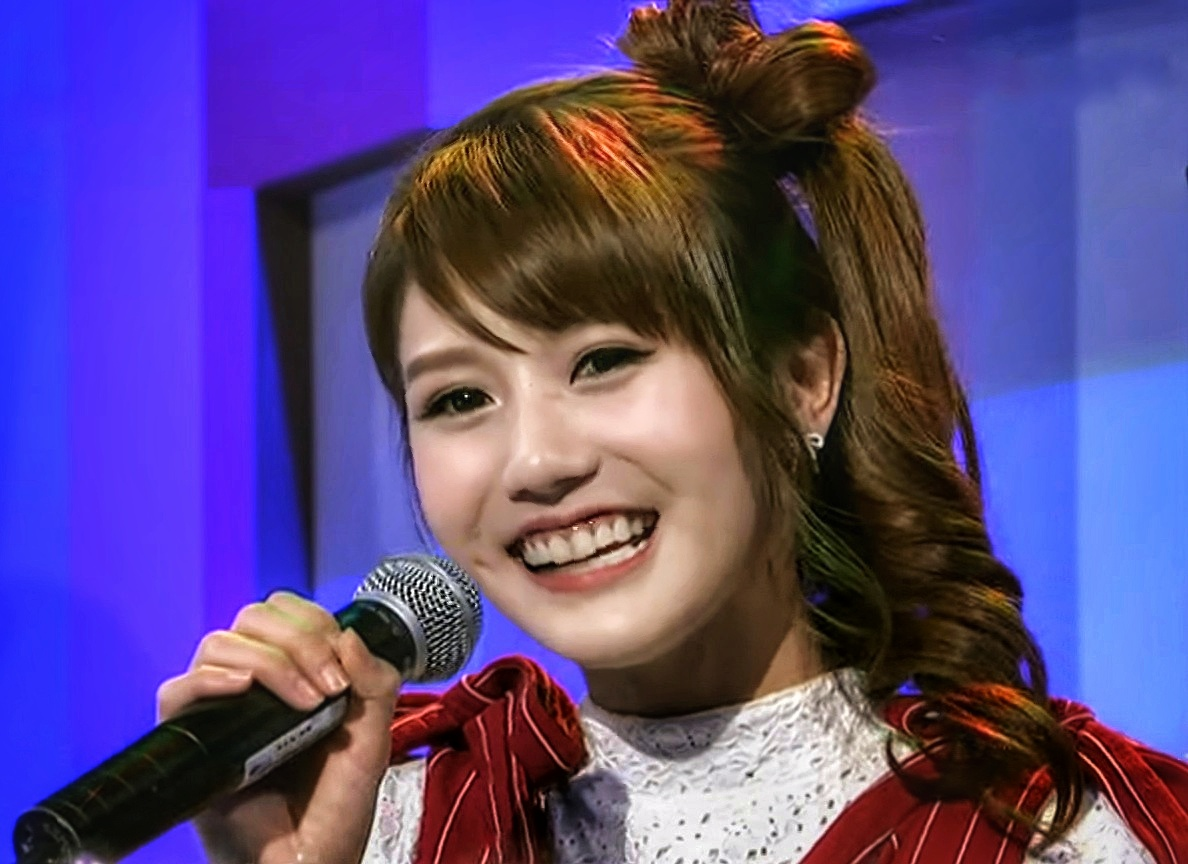
- Joyce Chu in 2016.
- Born: Joyce Chu Chu Ai; 7 March 1997 (age 29); Johor Bahru, Johor, Malaysia
- Education: SJK(C) Pei Hwa, Johor Bahru, Malaysia; Si Ling Secondary School, Singapore
- Occupations: Singer; songwriter; actress
- Years active: 2014–present
- Height: 166 cm (5 ft 5 in)
- Musical career
- Origin: Malaysia
- Instruments: Vocals; guitar; ukulele; piano
- Labels: RED People; Avex Taiwan; EQ MUSIC; The DOW Cultural Taiwan; AC Music Entertainment

Chinese name
- Traditional Chinese: 朱主愛
- Simplified Chinese: 朱主爱
Transcriptions
Standard Mandarin
- Hanyu Pinyin: Zhū Zhǔái
Yue: Cantonese
- Jyutping: Zyu1 Zyu2 Oi3

Si Ye Cao
- Traditional Chinese: 四葉草
- Simplified Chinese: 四叶草
- Literal meaning: Four-leaf clover
Transcriptions
Standard Mandarin
- Hanyu Pinyin: Sì Yè Cǎo
Yue: Cantonese
- Jyutping: Sei3 Jip6 Cou2

Joyce Chu (Chinese: 朱主爱; pinyin: Zhū Zhǔái; born 7 March 1997), nicknamed "four-leaf clover" (simplified Chinese: 四叶草; traditional Chinese: 四葉草; pinyin: Sì Yè Cǎo), is a Malaysian singer-songwriter and actress. She is best known for her viral songs "Malaysia Chabor" and "I Miss You", whose catchy melodies became internet sensation. In 2020, she participated in the Chinese girl group competition show Produce Camp 2020 (Chuang 2020), where she ranked 9th. She is now a solo singer.

== Early life ==
Joyce Chu is a local Malaysian Chinese of mixed Hainanese-Hokkien descent, born and raised in Johor Bahru, Johor, Malaysia. She has an older sister, Joana, and an older brother, Joey, who starred in some of her YouTube videos. She studied in Si Ling Secondary School in Singapore, but decided not to further her studies after completing GCE 'O' Level examination to focus on her career. She plays piano, guitar and ukulele.

== Career ==
In 2014, she was scouted by Namewee and joined his company label RED People. She debuted with the song "Malaysia Chabor". Upon debuting, the song instantly received widespread attention in Malaysia and she was launched into overnight stardom. The song was composed by Namewee, in the lyrics she tells others that she is a "Malaysian Chabor" (Malaysian girl), and not Korean which is what people assumed. The word 'chabor' means girl in Hokkien. The song spawned many covers and parodies. The music video has since reached over 30 million views on YouTube as of 2023.

In October 2014, Chu released a song "Your Little Round Hand" for the 100th anniversary of Doraemon. In November 2015, Chu release her debut self-titled EP, with three songs, and started debuting in Taiwan.

The lead song "I Miss You" from the EP, became an instant hit and went viral due to its catchy lyrics and melodies. This song was also covered by other celebrities and singers, such as Happy Polla and TFBoys, leading to a further rise in popularity. The MV has since garnered around 58 million views on YouTube. Subsequently, "I Miss You 2.0" featuring Namewee, and a Vietnamese version were released. The song later went viral due to an apparition in the video of what appeared to be a man plunging off of a roof.

In May 2016, she starred in the Singaporean comedy film, Young & Fabulous. She is the lead role alongside Aloysius Pang, Jeffrey Xu and Joshua Tan in the film about cosplay. In June 2016, Chu was one of the main participants in the Chinese music reality show Heroes of Remix, under the mentorship of Wang Leehom.

In December 2016, she released her second EP "Together / Merry Cold Christmas", with three songs. In 2017, she released a song titled "Simple Love" with local singer Michiyo Ho; and the cover song "The Never Old Legend" from Jacky Cheung. In December 2017, she released her first studio album ''Where It All Started'', with ten songs.

In 2018, Chu starred in Taiwanese web drama, Music in Love. In 2019, she has a cameo in the Thailand romantic comedy film Friend Zone, and is one of the Southeast Asian singers for its main OST. She also recorded the opening song for Chinese drama series Le Coup de Foudre.

In April 2020, she acted in the Taiwanese drama series I, Myself. She is one of the main cast in the self-healing themed series and acts in Taiwanese Hokkien. In May 2020, she participates in the Chinese girl group competition show Produce Camp 2020 (Chuang 2020), where she is one of the two trainees from Southeast Asia. She successfully entered the final round, and finished with 9th place.

== Discography ==
=== As solo artist ===
==== Studio albums ====
- Where It All Started 我來自四葉草 (2017)

==== EPs ====
- Joyce Chu 四叶草 (2015)
- Together / Merry Cold Christmas 在一起 / 冷冷 der 聖誕節 (2016)

==== Singles ====
Year	Title	Album / EP
2013	Because You Are You 因為你是你	Non-album single
2014	Malaysia Chabor 马来西亚查某	Joyce Chu
2014	Your Little Round Hand 伸出圓手	Where It All Started
2014	Like Me!!	Non-album single
2014	謝謝你 Thank you	Non-album single
2015	Sweet Home 家裡	Red Red People Red Red Year; Where It All Started
2015	It's A Long Day	Joyce Chu
2015	I Miss U 好想你	Joyce Chu
2015	I Miss U 2.0 (ft. Namewee) 好想你 2.0	Crossover Asia (Namewee's Album)
2016	Em nhớ anh (I Miss U Vietnamese version)	Non-album single
2016	I Miss U 3.0 (ft. Namewee) 好想你 3.0	Non-album single
2016	Water! 打功夫! (ft. Namewee)	Non-album single
2016	321 Go!	OST for Singaporean film Young & Fabulous
2016	Together 在一起 (ft. Namewee)	Together / Merry Cold Christmas
2016	Merry Cold Christmas 冷冷der聖誕節	Together / Merry Cold Christmas
2017	Together (Ver. 2017) 在一起 (2017 個唱版)	Non-album single
2017	Mambo Island 新寶島曼波	Where It All Started
2017	Simple Love 小清新 (with Michiyo Ho)	Where It All Started
2017	The Never Old Legend 不老的传说	Non-album single
2017	Answer The Phone! 快接電話!	Where It All Started
2017	Oh My Mother! 阿娘喂!	Where It All Started
2018	Fell In Love With You Ridiculously 莫名其妙愛上你	Where It All Started
2018	In This Room 小房间	Where It All Started
2019	คิดมาก 想太多	OST for Thailand film Friend Zone
2019	Unseen Heartbeat 藏不住的心跳	OST for Chinese drama Le Coup de Foudre
2019	Hello 5G	Non-album single
2020	做梦	做梦 - Single
2020	老公公老婆婆	老公公老婆婆 - Single
2020	爱的魔法圈	爱的魔法圈 - Single

=== With Red People ===
==== Albums ====
- Red Red People Red Red Year 红红年 (2015)

==== Singles ====
Year	Title	Album
2014	You're Not Red 你不紅	Non-album single
2014	Sambal Party 38派對	Non-album single
2015	七洞強 (CNY 2015)	Red Red People Red Red Year 红红年
2015	咩咩咩	Red Red People Red Red Year 红红年

== Filmography ==
=== Films ===
Year	Country	Title	Role	Notes
2016	Singapore	Young & Fabulous 最佳伙扮	Violet Ong	Lead role
2019	Thailand	Friend Zone	Herself	Cameo

=== Series ===
Year	Country	Title	Role	Notes
2018	Taiwan	Music in Love 音为爱上你	Lead	Web series
2020	Taiwan	Dancing to Silence 舞出寂靜	Cameo	
2020	Taiwan	I, Myself 若是一個人	Main cast	
2020	China	Produce Camp 2020	Contestant	Survival show
