= Gentle Bones =

Singaporean singer-songwriter (born 1994)

- Born: Joel Can; 23 March 1994 (age 32); Singapore
- Genres: Visual, folk rock, indie, Alternative R&B
- Instruments: Vocals, keyboard, guitar, drums
- Years active: 2012–present
- Label: Cross Ratio Entertainment
- Website: gentlebones.com

Joel Tan (born 23 March 1994), better known by his stage name Gentle Bones, is a Singaporean singer-songwriter. His self-titled debut EP, released in 2014, as well as the singles released from it have charted on iTunes and Spotify, making him one of Singapore's more popular acts.

== Career ==
Tan started playing the guitar and writing tunes in 2010 at age 16, and has been uploading covers of others' songs onto YouTube since late 2011. Since the creation of his YouTube account, it has garnered more than 4000 subscriptions, as well as two thousand likes on his Facebook page. Explaining his moniker, "Gentle Bones", it came out as random words which when put together, becomes a paradox which evokes a sense of mystery.

Since then, Tan has performed in various major music festivals in Singapore, including the Noise Festival in 2011, the Mosaic Music Festival in 2012 and the SEA Games launch in 2014. In the same year, Tan released his debut EP, Gentle Bones. The debut single from the EP, "Until We Die", released in 2013, went on and charted at #1 on the iTunes chart, subsequently, "Save Me" and "Elusive" followed and charted at #1 and #3 respectively on the same charts.

In 2015, Tan became the first Singaporean artist to sign with Universal Music Singapore. Tan also wrote and recorded two songs, "You're Almost There", which was included in the compilation album Songs of the Games, for the 2015 Southeast Asian Games held in Singapore, as well as "Sixty Five", which was included in historical film 1965. He was also featured in MMXJ's song "Kings". At the same time, Tan collaborated with Topman, and became part of the *SCAPE Invasion Tour, together with artists such as Shigga Shay, Daphne Khoo and HubbaBubbas, where he tours various schools and showcases his music.,

Tan released his second EP titled 'Geniuses & Thieves' on 3 June 2016, hitting the top of the iTunes chart on that very same day. He also held a two-night sold out concert on the 10 and 11 June 2016 at the Esplanade

Tan also collaborated with Topman in ION Orchard to sell his 'Geniuses & Thieves' merchandise on 16 May 2016.

The same year, Tan earned himself a spot on the inaugural Forbes 30 under 30 list for entertainment personalities, at the age of 21.

In 2020, Tan released his first Mandarin single "你还不知道？(Don't You Know Yet?)" with singer-songwriter Tay Kewei, a soothing ballad that narrates a story of young love. He also collaborated with Benjamin Kheng in the same year and released an EP, Better With You, which garnered more than a million streams on Spotify in less than two months.

Tan had recently released his very first regional collaboration single 'A Day At A Time' with Filipino singer-songwriter Clara Benin.

A collaboration between Gentle Bones and Lullaboy was announced on June 10, 2022 as a duo named Bones & The Boy, with their debut single release entitled "Good In Me".

== Personal life ==
Tan was educated in Hwa Chong Institution, and studied at Nanyang Technological University's Business School.

== Discography ==
=== Extended Plays (EP) ===
- Gentle Bones (2014)
- Geniuses & Thieves (2016)
- Michelle (2018)
- Better With You (2020)

=== Album ===
- Gentle Bones (2021)
- The Art of Thanking Yourself (2022)
