= Clementi Town Secondary School =

- 锦文中学; Sekolah Menengah Clementi Town

Location
- 10 Clementi Avenue 3 Clementi, 129904; Singapore; 1.3155°N 103.7623°E

Information
- Type: Government; Co-educational
- Motto: Aspire and Grow
- Established: 1980; 46 years ago
- Session: Single session
- School code: 3029
- Principal: Rasidah Binte Rahim
- Enrolment: ~1,350
- Colour: White Green
- Website: clementitownsec.moe.edu.sg

Clementi Town Secondary School (CTSS) is a government secondary school located in Clementi, Singapore, founded in the 1980s.

== History ==
The school was officially opened on 22 July 1982 by the then-Member for Parliament of Clementi Bernard Chen. In 1984, in order to prevent students loitering in public places, the school's prefects, in cooperation with the Students' Care Service, set up a location for students to relax and study after school hours. This centre was the first of its kind in secondary schools in Singapore.

== Notable alumni ==
- Joi Chua: singer
- Derrick Hoh: singer
- Pornsak Prajakwit: television presenter, Mediacorp

== See also ==
- List of schools in Singapore
