= Sandra Riley Tang =

Singaporean singer and songwriter

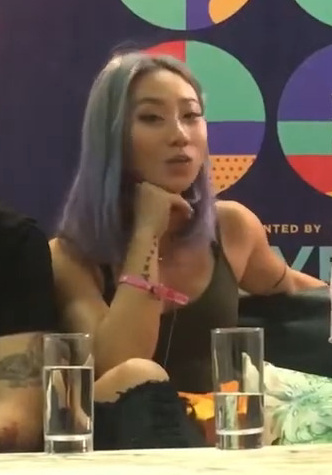
- Sandra Riley Tang in 2018 at an interview for the Jakarta International Expo

Background information
- Born: Sandra Riley Tang; 25 December 1990 (age 35); Singapore
- Origin: Singapore
- Genres: Dance pop, Pop, R&B
- Occupations: Actress, singer
- Years active: 2012–present
- Label: Sony Music Singapore
- Formerly of: The Sam Willows
- Website: thesamwillows.com (archived from the original)

Sandra Riley Tang (born 25 December 1990), known mononymously as RRILEY, is a Singaporean artist and musician who made her debut into the industry in 2012 as a founding member of local pop quartet The Sam Willows.

== Career ==
As part of The Sam Willows, she has performed at numerous festivals and events around the globe including the SXSW Festival in Texas, Ultra Singapore, Summer Sonic in Japan, We The Fest in Jakarta and Hyper Play Singapore 2018. The Sam Willows have also obtained multiple gold and platinum certifications for their previous two albums, and in 2019, they were featured in Forbes 30 Under 30 Asia list, which showcases young and influential disruptors, innovators, and entrepreneurs in Asia.

Tang has co-hosted on Michael Bolton’s reality show “Bolt of Talent” in August 2017, which aired on Fox Live Asia and performed a duet with the award-winning singer at his concert that same year. In 2018, she paired with Canadian pop artist Daniel Powter, to perform a duet for the Singapore President’s Star Charity.

In 2019, she released her debut solo single "Burn" as RRILEY, which showcases the singer’s various musical influences, while also offering a first glimpse into her capabilities as a solo artist. The track has garnered over 1 million streams online since its release.

She released a second single "mmm bye" in August 2019, which explores themes of self-doubt and pressure.

In 2020, she released a new single in March titled "Love Me Like A" as an unconventional love song. On August, she released her debut EP, "Alpha", which includes a track with Zamaera called "Fire".

== Personal life ==
Apart from her musical endeavours, Tang has expanded her talents into other areas of expertise. On 2015, The singer co-founded local yoga studio "The Yoga Collective" and pursued Evolve MMA in the form of Brazilian Jiujitsu, earning herself a blue belt in 2018. She also explored directing, having helmed the director’s chair for projects like her band The Sam Willows’ music video for the single ‘Keep Me Jealous’ (which has gone on to win numerous awards since its release) and co-directing 'Burn' music video.

== Filmography ==
=== Movies ===
Year	Title	Role	Notes
2016	Young & Fabulous 最佳伙扮	Nadia Ang	Singapore's 1st cosplay-themed movie.

== Discography ==
=== Singles ===
Year	Title	Format	Album	Other notes
2019	"Burn"	Digital download, streaming	Non-album single	Solo debut
2019	"mmm bye"	Digital download, streaming	Non-album single	
2020	"Love Me Like A"	Digital download, streaming	Non-album single	
