= Take Heart (The Sam Willows album) =

Studio album by The Sam Willows
- Released: 30 October 2015
- Genre: Indie pop
- Length: 32:02
- Language: English
- Label: Sony Music Singapore

The Sam Willows chronology
The Sam Willows (2012)	Take Heart (2015)	I Know, But Where (2018)

Singles from Take Heart
- 1. "Take Heart" Released: 24 July 2015; 2. "For Love" Released: 1 October 2015; 3. "All Time High" Released: 21 April 2016

Take Heart is the debut studio album by Singaporean pop band The Sam Willows, released on 30 October 2015 through Sony Music Entertainment Singapore.

== Production ==
The band travelled to Stockholm, Sweden to record the 9-track album with producer Harry Sommerdahl.

== Release and promotion ==
On 30 October 2015, the band released the album and started promoting the album around Southeast Asia. The Sam Willows played a live concert in Kuala Lumpur, which was sold out and another solo show in Manila, Philippines on top of their opening act for Little Mix's Get Weird Tour 2016.

In July 2016, the quartet's very own concert in Singapore at The Coliseum was sold out.

== Commercial performance ==
The first two singles from the album, "Take Heart" and "For Love", each debuted at number one on the Singapore iTunes chart.

Take Heart was certified Gold in recognition of sales in September 2016.

== Track listing ==
No.	Title	Length
1.	"Rest of Your Life"	3:23
2.	"Take Heart"	3:50
3.	"Taking All His Time"	3:42
4.	"Riverdance"	4:14
5.	"For Love"	3:57
6.	"Stay"	3:36
7.	"Not The Only One"	3:19
8.	"All Time High"	4:10
9.	"Glasshouse - Lillywhite Edition"	3:50
Total length:		32:02
