= Benjamin Kheng =

Singaporean actor, singer and influencer

- 金文明
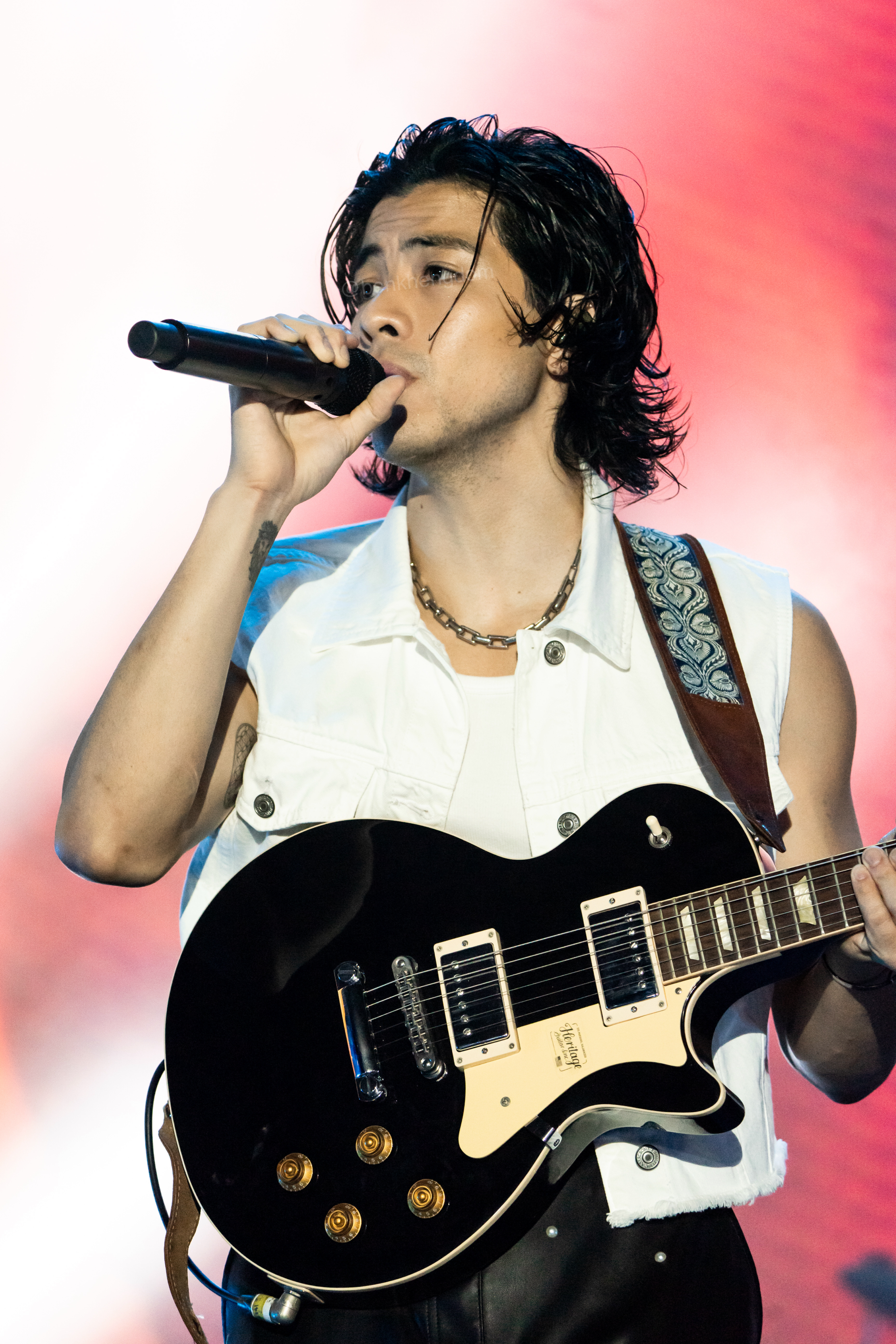
- Kheng in 2024
- Born: 15 August 1990 (age 36); Singapore
- Education: Anglo-Chinese School (Primary); Anglo-Chinese School (Independent); Singapore Sports School; Republic Polytechnic
- Occupations: Singer; songwriter
- Years active: 2012–present
- Height: 1.73 m (5 ft 8 in)
- Spouse: Naomi Yeo (m. 2021)
- Relatives: Narelle Kheng (sister)
- Musical career
- Genres: Indie pop
- Label: Sony Music Singapore
- Website: thesamwillows.com (archived from the original)

Benjamin Kheng (born 15 August 1990) is a Singaporean singer-songwriter, and former national swimmer. Kheng is known for songs such as "The Caifan Song", "Not Alone", a series titled The BenZi Project, and for being a member of The Sam Willows from 2012 as his music debut, which went on hiatus since 2019.

Kheng released "The Caifan Song" in September 2021 with Annette Lee, a Singaporean singer, which gave Kheng mainstream popularity according to Bryan Lim of Yahoo Life. Kheng released "Not Alone" in May 2024 as the National Day Parade's theme song for that year, which gave him "cross-generational" popularity according to Helmi Yusof of The Business Times.

Kheng also co-created The BenZi Project, an online comedy sketch series, with Hirzi Zulkiflie, a Singaporean YouTuber, containing parodies exploring middle-class privilege and racial stereotypes.

== Early life and education ==
Benjamin Kheng (Note: Chinese: 金文明; pinyin: Jīn Wénmíng) was born on 15 August 1990. Kheng has a younger sister, Narelle Kheng, who is also part of The Sam Willows. He grew up exposed to many career paths supported by his parents, such as music, acting, and sports. Kheng describes his household as "non-[traditionally] Asian" and musical.

Kheng's mother died when he was eight years old of breast cancer, which gave him separation anxiety and taught him to live in the moment, and made him go for therapy. Kheng's father remarried; he has three stepbrothers.

As a teenager, Kheng sang Christmas carols to hospital patients with school friends. In his late teens to early twenties, he worked part-time at Lush 99.5FM and acted in student productions.

Kheng attended Anglo-Chinese School (Primary). He also attended Anglo-Chinese School (Independent) through Direct School Admission with swimming, performing poorly in academics, ranking second-to-last in his cohort. Kheng joined the Singapore Sports School due to its novelty and in search of a better schooling experience. Kheng has a diploma in Arts and Theatre Management from Republic Polytechnic.

=== Swimming ===
Kheng was a former national youth swimmer, having trained for twelve years from six years old at the Swimfast Aquatic Club, managed by David Lim, a Singaporean swimmer, encouraged by his father, enjoying its therapeutic aspect.

After attending Singapore Sports School in 2004, his swimming career became more professional according to Corrie Tan of The Straits Times, participating in competitions in Britain and Australia. Kheng wanted to go competitive after realising that he had higher pain tolerance than others. He specialised in long-distance and individual medley (IM), which are more difficult categories according to Kheng, finding it easier to stand out and win in less competed categories.

As a child, Kheng participated in the Junior Age Group Swim Championships, obtaining some gold medals in the breaststroke and the IM categories. He also participated in and won some medals at the Australian Open Championships, Southeast Asia Age Group Championships and International Children's Games. He was once a record holder in the national youth 200m and 400m IM categories.

During his swimming career, he harboured an interest for performing arts, attending theatrical and music performances. After graduating from Republic Polytechnic in 2010, he stopped pursuing swimming, quoting the short lifespan of sporting careers where athletes peaked from 26 to 30 years old, describing the Olympics as his overambitious and unrealistic goal. Instead, Kheng opted for performing arts, supported by his father.

== Career ==
Kheng is signed with Fly Entertainment.

=== Music ===
Kheng is the keyboardist, rhythm guitarist and vocalist for The Sam Willows, a band that was active from 2012 until a hiatus on May 2019. After the announcement, he pursued a solo career. Kheng described his motivator as obsession, overcoming his imposter syndrome through his experience training for sports. Kheng enjoys the aspect of performing live the most. He enjoys many genres and music styles, being spontaneous in his interests. He says that artists are suppressed in Singapore, with musicians struggling to be recognised and maintain artistic integrity.

In June 2020, Kheng released A Sea That Never Stops, his first extended play (EP). It received 2.5 million views across multiple streaming services within four months. He was nominated for the Best Southeast Asian Act at the MTV Europe Music Awards in 2020.

In December 2020, Kheng and Gentle Bones, a Singaporean singer, co-released Better With You, an EP with two tracks, after attending a mutual friend's wedding ceremony. The music video combined the setting of Star Trek and the storyline of Doctor Who, according to Karen Gwee of New Musical Express. The songs were written amidst the COVID-19 pandemic to cheer people up and encourage checking in on loved ones, and was inspired by the mutual admiration Kheng and Gentle Bones held for each other.

In January 2021, Kheng released "Fresh Feelings" with J.Sheon, a Taiwanese artist, about the uncertainty and happiness of a new love, in a timid and humble manner. According to Gwee, the song had influences from gospel and musical theatre, quoting its use of a choir and "bright" keyboard sounds.

In August 2021, Kheng released "Worlds", a short song under a minute sang with Rae, a virtual influencer. Rae's voice was generated using text-to-speech and a vocoder. Described as "melancholic" by Shanne Gan of Hear65, Kheng was inspired by the longing of a loved person after their death, similar to how Kheng and Rae were separated by a digital barrier.

In November 2021, Kheng released "Baby Mama", a romance song about recognising a mutually bad relationship but being unable to sever ties with each other.

In March 2022, Kheng released "Good For A Time" with Bea Lorenzo, a Filipino artist, described by Kheng as a "breakup song" spanning international borders. Kheng enjoyed the challenges of creating the song during the COVID-19 pandemic, such as music video continuity and Zoom latency during jamming.

In 2023, Kheng released Gloomy Boogie, his first album, which was released in two parts; once in August and once in December. Kheng wanted to explore the dichotomy of his introverted and extroverted selves, without being conscious of his self-image unlike previously. It was described as "confessional" by Eddino Abdul Hadi, Benson Ang, and Jan Lee, of The Straits Times, with tracks featuring "loneliness", "fatigue", and "heartbreak".

In May 2024, Kheng released "Not Alone", as the National Day Parade's 2024 theme song, co-written with Evan Low, a producer with the Music and Drama Company as an ensemble. Written about Singaporeans' historical struggles, the song promoted camaraderie in preparation for the future, inspired by his struggles in life such as isolation and loneliness, citing his mother's death. Kheng wrote the song, preferring to be honest over being patriotic. It also paid homage to previous NDP songs to create nostalgia, such as "Where I Belong" by Tanya Chua, for an intergenerational appeal.

The visuals begin simply, featuring kampong villages and getai performances, with "melancholic" lyrics according to Sushmita Kaur of Hear65. The visuals then transition to modern Singapore employing vignettes, featuring Jewel Changi Airport to illustrate the changing shared memories, with the music changing to become "uplifting" according to Kaur. Osmond Chia of The Straits Times wrote that its lyrics had a "tinge of sadness". Kong Kit Yan of Channel NewsAsia wrote that it received an "overwhelmingly positive response" online. Helmi Yusof of The Business Times wrote that the song gave him "cross-generational" and "cross-cultural" popularity.

In 2025, Kheng released "Olivia Dean" with Shazza, a Singaporean singer-songwriter, after having performed together at the NDP. The song, described as "upbeat" by Eddino, is written about first love and named after Olivia Dean, an English neo-soul singer-songwriter.

==== Ann & Ben Show ====
Kheng is also known for The Ann & Ben Show, a comedy music video series created with another Singaporean artist, Annette Lee. Kheng wanted to see if he could make funny and relatable songs with Lee, as they both had free time during the COVID-19 pandemic. The songs were received positively by Singaporeans.

The Ann & Ben Show includes the Mandarin power ballad, named "The Caifan Song", (Note: Chinese: 这个那个; pinyin: zhè gè nà gè) which was released on September 2021. It has a high production value according to Toh Ziyi of Channel NewsAsia. It is a parody video, about the mixed emotions when ordering cai fan in Singaporean life. It was received positively from Internet users and celebrities, who wrote that the tune was catchy. The song received 300,000 views on YouTube in three days, and as of June 2023, it received over 1.3 million views, "quickly [going] viral" according to Sophie Hong of Her World. Bryan Lim of Yahoo Life wrote that the song gave Kheng mainstream popularity.

In 2023, they released "We Are...", presented by the Singapore Chinese Cultural Centre, about the meaning of being a Singaporean Chinese, and the traits that made locals different from foreigners, such as kiasuism and an over-reliance on pinyin.

=== Video creation ===
When writing, Kheng cites Breaking Bad as an inspiration, with its nuanced storytelling and character arcs. He likens writing and directing a film to creating music and storytelling. Kheng created a video production company named Charle King with Ted Charles, a creative director.

Kheng co-created The BenZi Project, an online comedy sketch series, with Hirzi Zulkiflie, a Singaporean YouTuber, containing parodies exploring middle-class privilege and racial stereotypes. Kheng had wanted to make a social commentary in a light-hearted educational way, using comedy to make the content more palatable, citing the young Singaporeans' ignorance of societal problems that did not affect them, hoping to broaden their world view. He also wanted to challenge his reputation as a musician, trying something new in his career.

== Incidents ==
=== Kurt Cobain portrayal ===
Kheng was asked to portray Kurt Cobain, a singer from Nirvana who shot himself in 1994, being given a reference picture of Cobain "smoking a cigarette in a gun posture" during a photo shoot for Men's Folio, a magazine. According to Loh Keng Fatt of The Straits Times, the pose resembled pointing a gun at oneself, drawing anger from internet users who perceived it as being insensitive. In September 2019, Kheng apologised, saying that it was a misjudgement and that he forgot the details of his death, which was received positively by internet users.

== Personal life ==
Kheng married host and actress, Naomi Yeo in 2021, after meeting in Dead Lucky, a 2018 drama series, and becoming friends after The Intruder in 2019. He has a dog named Bailey. Kheng enjoys Christmas, quoting fond memories and increased joy in society. Kheng likes viewing films and art works, enjoying creative works. He owns a community choir named "Sing Song Social Club".

As an advocate for mental health, Kheng spoke at TEDxYouth about his experience overcoming depression and anxiety disorder with synaesthesia. Martial arts helped Kheng conquer his own mood disorder. In 2025, Kheng was diagnosed with dangerously high levels of low-density lipoproteins, prompting him to do long-distance running, running 60km every week in June 2026, and relies on lifelong medication. He also went on a diet, avoiding processed foods, and launched an initiative titled "Ben There Run That", a run club which combines social exercise with live music for community wellness.

== Filmography ==
=== Movies ===
Year	Title	Role	Notes	Ref.
2016	Young & Fabulous	Jay Lee		
2017	Wonder Boy	Dick Lee		
2025	Sandbox			

=== Television ===
Year	Title	Role	Notes	Ref.
2013	Unnatural	Jake	Season 3 Episode 2	
2014	Mata Mata 2	Ringo		
2014	Code of Law 2	Benji		
2014	Do It Yourself	Himself	Mockumentary and variety show	
2015	Love is Love - Fat Hope	Pete		
2016	The Breakup List	Luke		
2017	TrendSetters	Ken Beng		
2018	FAM	Jayden Tan		
2019	The Intruder	Adam		
2019	After Love	Ryan		
2024	The Last Bout	Boxer		

== Theatre ==
Year	Title	Role	Ref.
2012	National Broadway Company	Dick Lee	
2012	Romeo & Juliet	Romeo	
2014	Ah Boys to Men: The Musical	Ken Chow	
2015	The Emperor's New Clothes	Tailor	

== Discography ==
=== Albums ===
Year	Title	Ref.
2023	Gloomy Boogie	

=== Extended plays ===
Year	Title	Ref.
2020	A Sea That Never Stops	
