= Jonathan Chua =

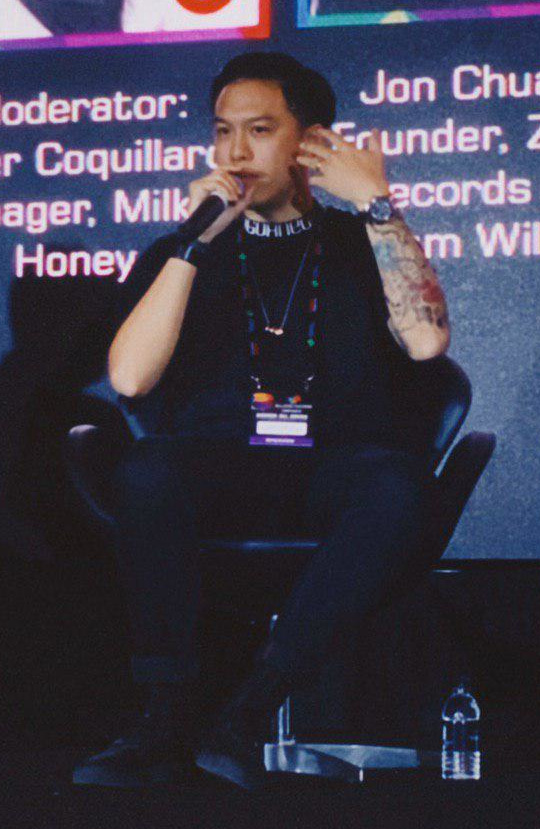
- Chua at Music Matters Live (2019)
- Born: Jonathan Chua Jian Xin; February 12, 1990 (age 36); Singapore
- Occupations: Actor; singer
- Years active: 2012–present
- Musical career
- Genres: Pop
- Label: Sony Music Singapore
- Formerly of: The Sam Willows
- Website: thesamwillows.com (archived from the original)

Chinese name
- Traditional Chinese: 蔡堅信
- Simplified Chinese: 蔡坚信
Transcriptions
Standard Mandarin
- Hanyu Pinyin: Cài Jiàn Xìn

Jonathan Chua Jian Xin (born 12 February 1990), better known as Jon Chua JX, is a Singapore-based actor and singer. He is one of the members of Singaporean band The Sam Willows and the co-founder and creative director of Zendyll Records, and managing director of Zendyll Productions.

== Early life and education ==
Chua was born and raised in Singapore. He attended Anglo-Chinese Junior College, and majored in Sociology at Nanyang Technological University.

== Career ==
Chua is a founding member of Singaporean band The Sam Willows, serving as the lead guitarist and vocalist.

In 2015, Jon started Zendyll Productions, a recording studio and sound design company in Singapore, with Evan Low, and in 2018, he launched Zendyll Records, a record label that is focused on artist & repertoire (A&R) creation, as well as creative production.

Chua has been a brand partner for Audi, Hugo, and Adidas.

In 2019, Chua was a speaker for the All That Matters conference alongside Patrick Moxey (Ultra Music) and Ghazi Shami (Empire Distribution).

Chua made his solo debut July 25, 2019, with the single "Ready For Ya", featuring Flannel Albert. The music video was also released on the same day.

== Personal life ==
Chua married Astro SuperSport TV presenter Amanda Chaang in 2018. In 2023, the couple had their first child, a son. The couple owns two Dachshunds named Chilli and Salsa.

Chua cites Pharrell Williams as his role model.

== Filmography ==
=== Movies ===
Year	Title	Role	Notes
2016	Young & Fabulous 最佳伙扮	Bamboo Ng	Singapore 1st Cosplay theme movie

== Discography ==
=== Singles ===
Year	Title	Format	Album	Other notes
2019	"Ready For Ya (feat. Flannel Albert)"	Digital download, streaming	Non-album single	Solo debut
2020	"Give It Back"	Digital download, streaming	Non-album single	
