= Narelle Kheng =

Singaporean actress, singer and influencer

- 金颂旖
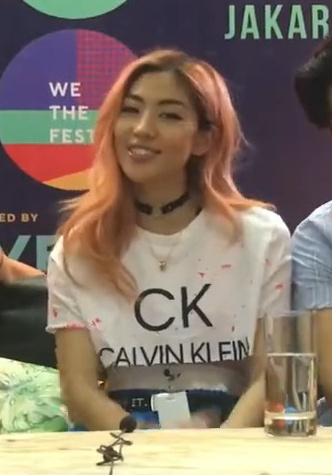
- Narelle Kheng in 2018 at an interview for the Jakarta International Expo
- Born: 24 September 1993 (age 33); Singapore
- Education: Nanyang Technological University
- Occupations: Singer; actress
- Years active: 2012–present
- Height: 1.65 m (5 ft 5 in)
- Relatives: Benjamin Kheng (brother)
- Musical career
- Origin: Singapore
- Genre: Indie pop
- Labels: Sony Music Singapore; Warner Records
- Website: thesamwillows.com (archived from the original)

Chinese name
- Traditional Chinese: 金頌旖
- Simplified Chinese: 金颂旖
Transcriptions
Standard Mandarin
- Hanyu Pinyin: Jīn Sòng Yī

Narelle Kheng Song Yi (born 24 September 1993) is a Singaporean singer, actress, and former national swimmer. She made her debut in the Singaporean band The Sam Willows in 2012.

== Personal life ==
Kheng was a national youth swimmer, having trained at the Singapore Sports School since the age of six.

She was educated at Methodist Girls' School, Anglo-Chinese Junior College and Singapore Sports School, before graduating from the Nanyang Technological University, where she majored in communication studies.

Narelle is the younger sister of Benjamin Kheng.

== Music career ==
Kheng is the bass guitarist and vocalist for The Sam Willows. After announcing their hiatus in May 2019, she has since pursued her solo career.

Narelle released her solo single "Outta My Head" on 4 April 2019. She released her debut EP "Part 2" on 10 October 2019, in conjunction with World Mental Health Day. On 26 March 2021, Narelle released "Complicated Love Song", which is part of her three-song EP, "Part 3".

== Acting career ==
Kheng had cameo roles in drama serials Zero Calling, Against The Tide and Peace & Prosperity.

In 2014, she and her brother, Benjamin, starred in a Channel 5 show, Do It Yourself creating DIY furniture.

In 2017, Kheng played the lead role, Cindy in the Toggle Original series Lifespam.

== Filmography ==
=== Film ===
Year	Title	Role	Notes	Ref.
2016	Young & Fabulous	Orange Tan	Singapore 1st Cosplay theme movie	
2016	Parandhu Sella Vaa	Min Yuan / Lily Chan	Tamil film	

=== Television ===
Year	Title	Role	Notes	Ref.
2014	Zero Calling	Jena	Cameo	
2014	Against the Tide	Jennie	Cameo	
2016	Peace & Prosperity	Ice	Appeared in episode 81	
2017	Lifespam	Cindy "Comatose Girl"	Main Role	

=== Variety ===
Year	Title	Role	Notes	Ref.
2014	Do It Yourself	Herself	A magazine infotainment variety show and a mockumentary sitcom	

== Discography ==
=== Singles ===
Year	Title	Format	Album	Other notes	Ref
2016	"Some They Lie"	Digital download, streaming	Non-album single		
2019	"Outta My Head"	Digital download, streaming	Non-album single		
2019	"Tears"	Digital download, streaming	Part 2	Solo EP	
2019	"Let Me Be"	Digital download, streaming	Part 2	Solo EP	
2019	"Blue"	Digital download, streaming	Part 2	Solo EP	
