= The Sam Willows =

Singaporean music band

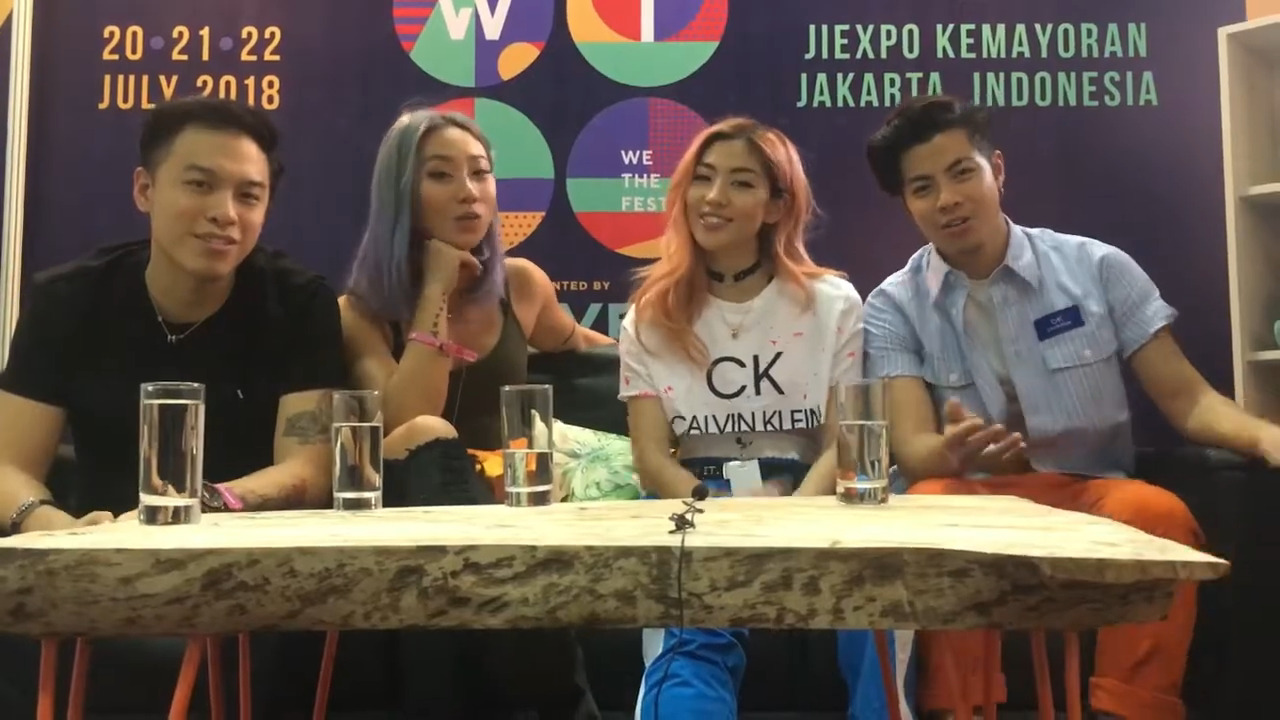
- (From left to right) Jonathan Chua, Sandra Riley Tang, Narelle Kheng, and Benjamin Kheng in 2018 at an interview for the Jakarta International Expo

Background information
- Origin: Singapore
- Genres: Indie pop, jazz fusion
- Years active: 2011–2019 (on indefinite hiatus)
- Labels: Sony Music Singapore; Warner Bros. Records
- Members: Jonathan Chua; Benjamin Kheng; Sandra Riley Tang; Narelle Kheng
- Website: thesamwillows.com (archived from the original)

The Sam Willows is a four-member Singaporean pop band formed in 2011. The group consists of siblings Narelle and Benjamin Kheng, together with their friends Sandra Riley Tang and Jonathan Chua. The quartet’s self-titled freshman EP was released in November 2012, followed by their debut full-length album Take Heart that was released in October 2015.

In July 2018, the band released I Know, But Where, their second full-length studio album.

As of May 2019, the band has gone on an indefinite hiatus. It was also confirmed that they have no plans to disband and will focus on personal projects for the time being.

== History ==
=== 2011 – 2013: Formation, The Sam Willows ===
The Sam Willows were formed in December 2011 by founding members: Benjamin Kheng, Jonathan Chua, Narelle Kheng, and Sandra Riley Tang.

Barely a year after they formed, the quartet launched their debut EP The Sam Willows under a distribution deal with Warner Music Singapore, and made their international debut in 2013 at the annual South by Southwest music festival in Texas. The band continued on a North American Tour, Korean Tour, and represented Singapore for the Western Australian Music Festival (WAM) in Perth.

In April 2013, the Singaporean quartet entered the studio with Steve Lillywhite for a week-long production session, organized by Singapore Music Society (SG MUSO). The result was a reworking of their track "Glasshouse" and released as the band’s latest single at the time. In August 2013, the band released their "Glasshouse (Lillywhite edition)" music video.

=== 2015 – 2016: Take Heart ===
The band signed to Sony Music Singapore on a 360 deal in January 2015 and embarked on their journey to Stockholm, Sweden to record their debut album, Take Heart, with producer Harry Sommerdahl the following month.

Take Heart was released later in the year in October 2015, with "Take Heart" as their first official single from the album released in May 2015. The music video for the song was later released in July 2015 and amassed over 1.6 million views on YouTube.

In the same year, the band opened for Irish pop-rock band, The Script, at the Singapore Indoor Stadium in April 2015. The Sam Willows also recorded three songs - "Flags Up", "Ordinary" and "Champion", for the compilation album, Songs of the Games for the 2015 Southeast Asian Games. To celebrate Singapore's independence, The Sam Willows performed at the National Day Parade 2015 in August 2015, playing one of Singapore's National Day songs, "Home".

In May 2016, the quartet supported Little Mix on their The Get Weird Tour in Manila and Singapore. Following that, the band sold out their first headlining concert in Singapore at The Coliseum.

=== 2017: Making of second album ===
The Sam Willows released an exclusive compilation album (consisting of 16 songs from their first EP, the Take Heart album and lead single "Keep Me Jealous" from their upcoming second album) in Japan (marketed and distributed by Sony Music Japan). They became the first English performing band from Singapore to be marketed and distributed by a major international music label in Japan.

In May 2017, The Sam Willows released "Keep Me Jealous", the first official single from their upcoming second album, co-produced by the band themselves and producers Fredrik Häggstam and Litens Anton Nilsson.

On 13 July 2017, the band released their next single, "Save Myself", co-produced with Harry Sommerdahl. "The song talks about how we’re usually the worst lovers to ourselves – we don’t know how to love or save ourselves till it’s too late," member Benjamin Kheng said of the song. The track clinched the 'Best Song' award.

=== 2018: I Know, But Where ===
On 9 February 2018, the band released two of their singles "Robot" and "Papa Money" simultaneously. Both tracks took over local airwaves and charted across territories such as Indonesia, Singapore, Malaysia and Philippines.

The initial release of four lead singles ("Keep Me Jealous", "Save Myself", "Papa Money" and "Robot") collectively garnered more than 10 million streams and have each been certified GOLD.

The Sam Willow's 11-track second album I Know, But Where was released on 6 July 2018, making it their second studio album. The album debuted at number 1 on the Singapore iTunes chart on the day of its release and has since found its way into charts around the region like Cambodia, Indonesia, Malaysia, Philippines and Taiwan.

With this album, the band hoped to "present a feel-good and happy version of the things (they) struggle with".

Featured in the line up of We the Fest 2018, The Sam Willows performed on day 2 of the festival. Headliners of the festival included Lorde, SZA, James Bay and more. The band also performed at Southeast Asia's First Esports Music Festival.

On 11 November 2018, the band released their Christmas special single, "I'm Gonna Be Loved (This Christmas)", which was released as part of their extended play Christmas EP.

=== 2019: Hiatus ===
On 26 April 2019, The Sam Willows released a mandarin rendition of their single "Say So", from their second studio album I Know, But Where, featuring Joanna Dong. The band was also involved in the 2019 Singapore National Day parade theme song. Later on 27 May, the band announced an indefinite hiatus and that the members would be focusing on solo activities for the time being.

== Members ==
=== Benjamin Kheng ===
Benjamin Kheng was born on 15 August 1990 (age 36) in Singapore. He is the keyboardist, rhythm guitarist and vocalist. He was a former national youth swimmer, having trained since he was 6. He attended Anglo-Chinese School (Primary), Anglo-Chinese School (Independent), Singapore Sports School and has a diploma in Arts and Theatre Management from Republic Polytechnic.

=== Jonathan Chua ===
Jonathan Chua was born on 12 February 1990 (age 36) in Singapore. He is the lead guitarist and vocalist. He took Sociology as a major in Nanyang Technological University. In 2015, Jon started Zendyll Productions, a recording studio and sound design company in Singapore. Jon is known to be the big brother in the band who gets things done

=== Narelle Kheng ===
Narelle Kheng was born on 24 September 1993 (age 33) in Singapore. She is the bass guitarist and vocalist. She was a former national youth swimmer, having trained since she was 6. She attended Methodist Girls' School, Singapore, Anglo-Chinese Junior College and Singapore Sports School, and took Communication Studies as her major in Nanyang Technological University's Wee Kim Wee School of Communication and Information. She had cameo roles in drama serials Zero Calling and Against The Tide, and starred in a Channel 5 show, Do It Yourself.

=== Sandra Riley Tang ===
Sandra Riley Tang was born on 25 December 1990 (age 35) in Singapore. She is the keyboardist, percussionist and vocalist. In 2012, she started RileyArt, which showcased and sold her handmade accessories, art and calligraphy. In 2015, she co-founded her yoga studio, The Yoga Collective. She made her solo debut as 'RRILEY' in 2019.

== Discography ==
- Take Heart (2015)
- I Know, But Where (2018)
