= The Road Ahead (song) =

- The thumbnail of "The Road Ahead" on YouTube

Single by Linying, Shabir Sulthan, Sezairi Sezali and Shye
- Language: English
- Released: July 2, 2021
- Genre: Electropop
- Length: 3:36
- Composers: Evan Low Jun Feng; Linying
- Producers: Evan Low Jun Feng; Linying

Official National Day (Singapore) song singles chronology
| "Everything I Am" (2020) | "The Road Ahead" (2021) | "Stronger Together" (2022) |

Music video
- "The Road Ahead" on YouTube

"The Road Ahead" is a song created by Linying, Shabir Sulthan, Sezairi Sezali and Shye for the 2021 Singapore National Day parade.

== Background ==
The song revolves around Singapore's ongoing coronavirus pandemic at that time.

== Music video ==
A music video was released on July 2, 2021.

== Commercial performance ==
The song was part of the five best national parade songs by The Straits Times in 2023.

== Personnel ==
All credits adapted from Apple Music.

Musicians

- NDPeeps – performer
- Shabir Sulthan – performer
- Sezairi Sezali – performer
- Linying – performer

Technical

- Evan Low Jun Feng – composer, producer
- Linying – composer, producer

== Other uses ==
The song was performed at Lawrence Wong's swearing-in ceremony as prime minister.
