= National Day Parade =

Annual parade in Singapore that celebrates the country's independence

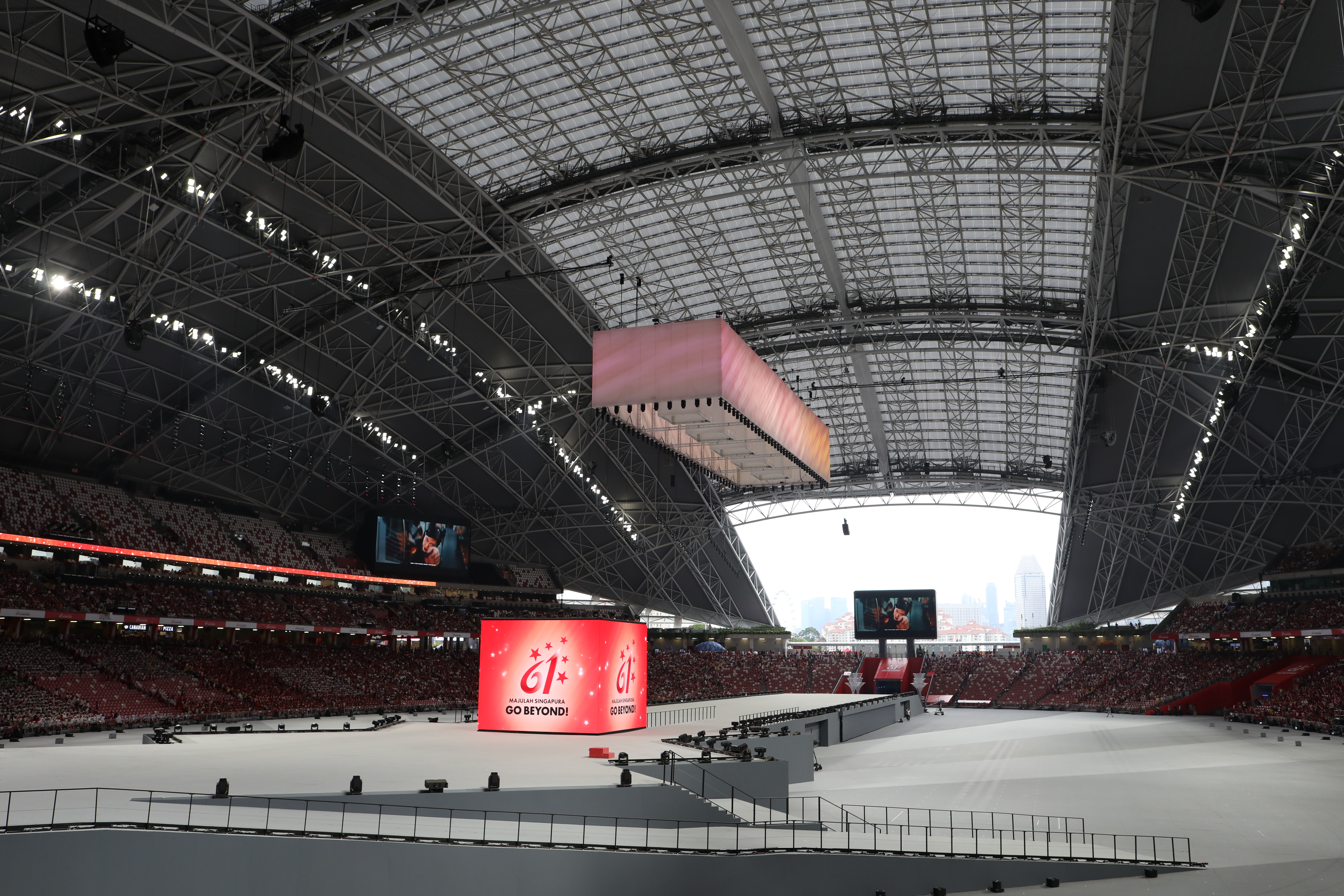
- A scene of the National Day Parade at National Stadium at 2026
- Status: Active
- Genre: Parade
- Date: 9 August
- Frequency: Annually
- Venue: The Float at Marina Bay; The Padang; National Stadium; Former National Stadium
- Country: Singapore
- Years active: 61
- Inaugurated: 9 August 1966

National Day Parade

Chinese name
- Chinese: 国庆庆典
Transcriptions
Standard Mandarin
- Hanyu Pinyin: Guóqìng Qìngdiǎn

Malay name
- Malay: Perbarisan Hari Kebangsaan Singapura

Tamil name
- Tamil: தேசிய தின அணிவகுப்பு

The National Day Parade (NDP) is an annual parade held in Singapore to commemorate its independence. Held annually on 9 August, it is the main public celebration of National Day, and consists of a parade incorporating contingents of the Singapore Armed Forces, Singapore Police Force, Singapore Civil Defence Force, primary and secondary school uniformed groups and other community groups, followed by a cultural presentation featuring music, songs, dance displays, and a fireworks show.

First held on 9 August 1966 to mark the one-year anniversary of Singapore's declaration of independence from Malaysia, it has been celebrated annually ever since. The parade had historically been held at the Padang, but were occasionally held at the former National Stadium, and in a "decentralised" format across the country to encourage wider public participation. Beginning in 1984, the Padang began to host the parade on a regular cycle (initially once every three years, and then every five years beginning 1995) and during all years marking anniversaries of national significance, with the event otherwise hosted by the National Stadium.

The parade officially takes place on 9 August, with public "preview" performances (with one, the "National Education Show", hosting invited students of Singapore schools) beginning as early as mid-June. Due to their high demand, tickets for the NDP and its previews have been distributed via an electronic lottery system since 2003.

With the closure of National Stadium in 2007, it would be replaced in the rotation by The Float @ Marina Bay—a temporary, floating venue on Marina Bay designed to host events of national importance while the new National Stadium was under construction. Even with the completion of the new stadium, it would only host the parade once in 2016, after which The Float was designated as the event's "primary" venue. In 2023, the parade began a tenure at the Padang due to the reconstruction of The Float as the permanent NS Square, while a second edition at the new National Stadium was announced for 2026.

== History ==
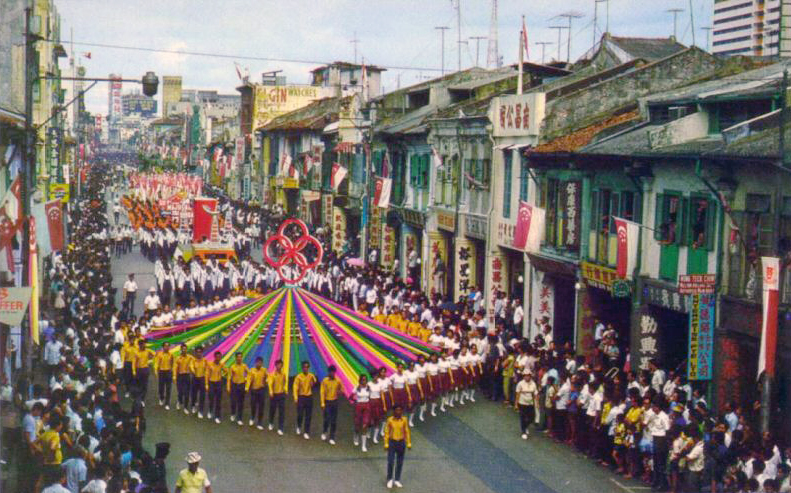
A scene from the National Day Parade, 1968, with a contingent from the People's Association in front

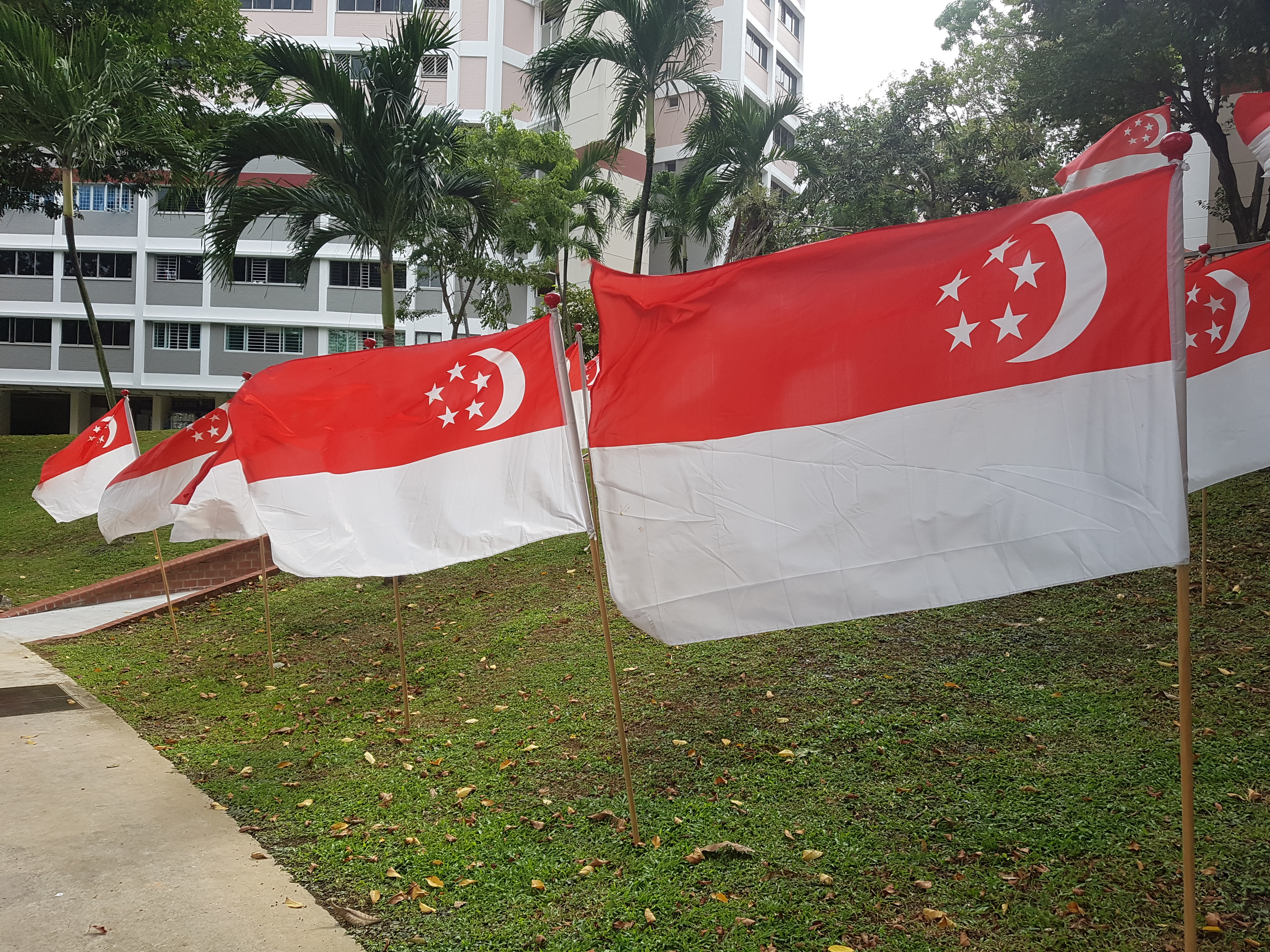
The flag of Singapore set up alongside pavements across the country

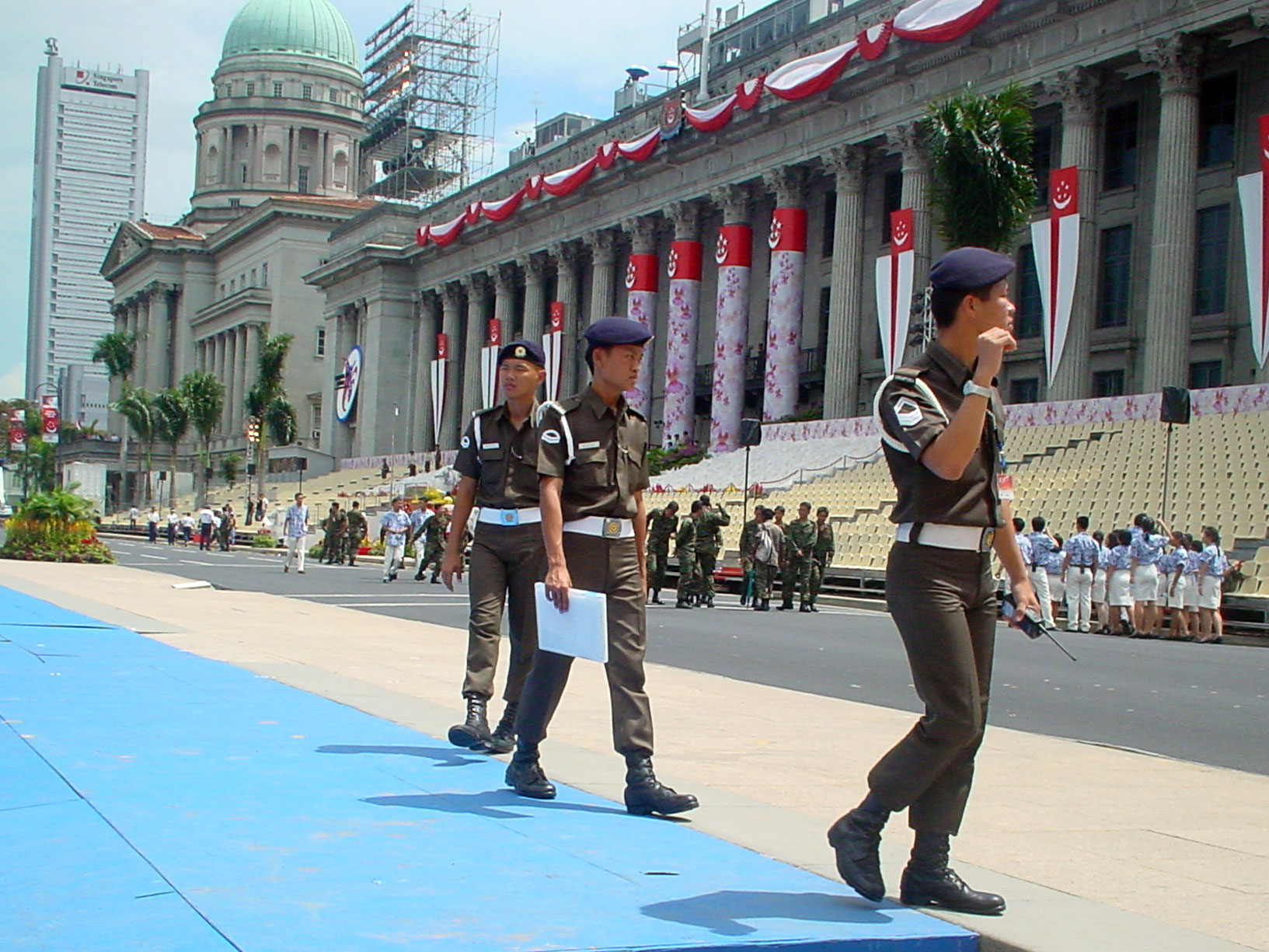
Singapore Armed Forces Military Police Command providing security coverage at the Padang during the National Day Parade in 2000

Singapore celebrated its first National Day as an independent nation in 1966, one year after Singapore's separation from Malaysia on 9 August 1965.

The inaugural National Day Parade was started in the morning at 9:00 a.m. that day. However, people came as early as 7:00 a.m. in order to get good vantage points. Singapore's first President, Yusof bin Ishak and Singapore's first Prime Minister, Lee Kuan Yew, were seated with members of the government at the grandstand on the steps of City Hall. When the parade began, six military contingents (including the Singapore Infantry Regiment, Singapore People's Defense Force, the Volunteer Naval Reserve and PDF-Sea and the then Republic of Singapore Police), a mobile column from the SIR, and various schools and civil contingents marched past City Hall and then into the city streets. Three military bands accompanied the parade inspection and later the march past with military music. The Singapore Fire Brigade also took part in this first parade with its firetrucks included in the mobile column. Rounding it all was a massed lion and dragon dance performance from drum and dragon troupes nationwide.

In 1967, the contingents increased to 76, including those of the then established Singapore Armed Forces, the RSP and more cultural groups, with the addition of more civil marching groups. The reason is partly due to the introduction of the National Service program in the military and police forces, and later extended to the Fire Brigade (Renamed to Singapore Fire Services in the 1980s). Street performances by various groups and choirs also debuted in that year's parade. The 1968 parade, although held on a rainy morning that surprised even the marching contingents and the dignitaries, saw the first ground performances on the Padang as the weather improved – a prelude to today's show performances. 1969's parade, the one where the Mobile Column made its first drivepast, commemorated the 150th year of the city's founding and had Princess Alexandra of the UK as principal guest.

The fifth NDP edition in 1970 introduced the Flypast of the State Flag and the Republic of Singapore Air Force Flypast, as well as the combat simulation performance by Singapore Army personnel was one of the new highlights for that year.

The 1971 NDP included iconic mobile parade floats from various organizations, 1973 was the first parade to be held from late-afternoon to early-evening time in order to promote the parade with better attendance and marked the official debut of the 1st Commando Battalion. The 1974 parade was the first domestic television programme to be broadcast in colour by Channel 5, following a previous pilot broadcast of the FIFA World Cup final.

In 1975, to commemorate the Decennial anniversary of independence, the Parade was, for the first time, decentralised into 13 parade venues for more public participation. Almost all of the venues lasted for an hour and all of them even had route marches on the streets to the participating venues.

By the time the NDP was held at the National Stadium (for the first time) in 1976, the NDP Guard of Honour, composed of officers and personnel of the SAF and the Singapore Police Force made its first appearance, followed after the parade proper by the first evening presentations by various groups, a prelude to future evening NDPs in 1980 and from 1984 onward. The 1976 parade dance performers were mostly female students from the country's schools, since that year marked the start of the United Nations Decade for Women. 1977's parade was a decentralised event like two years before (and like 1968's was affected by wet weather) while 1978 returned to Padang. 1979's parade saw another decentralised site, this time being held in many high schools and sports stadiums nationwide. The decentralised format would later be used until 1983, which was the final time NDP was held in multiple venues until 2020.

The 15th installment in 1980 was the first parade to introduce the feu de joie of the Guard-of-Honour contingents. The following year, SPF Civil Defense Command, presently the Singapore Civil Defense Force, later combined with the SFS in 1989, made its inaugural appearance, followed by the SCDF in 1982. The 1981 parade was held in both Jurong and Queenstown Sports Stadiums for further increase public attendance and participation in the celebrations. In 1982, the parade returned at Padang, marking the first time the mobile column drove past after the marchpast had concluded, thus making it a predecessor to the parades at the Padang from 1995 onward, once every five years.

The 1984 installment featured many firsts in commemoration with the Singapore's Silver Jubilee of self-governance, which for the first time, introduced a theme song "Stand Up for Singapore", and included a bigger Mobile Column, the first appearance of the popular Silent Precision Drill Squad from the Singapore Armed Forces Military Police Command and the first evening fireworks display.

The 1986 edition was the first parade held in the late evening, and the first to use flashlights for audience use. Other introductions were featured over the years such as the first appearance of the massed military bands of the SAF (1987), the card stunt (1988), and the Red Lions parachute team and the daylight fireworks (1989). In 1989, the parade was held in the afternoon but the 1991 edition returned to the evening format used since 1986.

In 1993, interactive participation by the public debuted in that year's edition to increase public participation and awareness of the parade as an important part of Singaporean life and as a symbol of national unity and identity. In 1997, organisers began to hold the "National Education Show"—a rehearsal of the parade for an audience of invited school students; the event is intended to provide students with an opportunity to attend at least one NDP.

The 1999 edition, which was the last parade of the century, was the first parade to feature live orchestral music performing for the entire show for the first time by the Singapore Symphony Orchestra, under the baton of American conductor Bart Folse, which was the main music provider for that edition. The orchestra performed one of the songs at the parade such as the 1812 Overture which was played to fireworks at the end, as well as the event's theme song, "Together" (performed by Evelyn Tan and Dreamz FM, together with the 594-strong combined schools choir from various schools in Singapore in which they were the official choir for that year's parade with the SSO as the official orchestra for the parade as well), and a medley of National Day songs from 1984, 1986, 1998, and 1987. The orchestra would later return 8 years later in 2007 as part of the 240-member NDP 2007 Orchestra along with the Singapore Chinese Orchestra, the Malay and Indian ensembles, the Singapore Armed Forces Band, and the SYC Ensemble Singers.

Due to the event's popularity, Singaporeans often lined up in overnight queues for a chance to obtain tickets to the NDP and its preview events; in 1993, the Special Operations Command had to be sent in to control overcrowding at one distribution site, and scalping became common by the mid-1990s due to both high demand and the Asian financial crisis. In 2002, organisers attempted to control crowds by not revealing the distribution sites in advance, but this did not alleviate crowding once the locations became known. In 2003, to rectify these issues, organisers adopted an electronic "ballot" system for tickets, in which residents register online or with a phone number for a chance to receive parade tickets. The new system was not without its initial problems, including tickets being left unclaimed due to applicants providing incorrect phone numbers, and the registration website having difficulties coping with the large amount of traffic.

In 2005 and 2010, aside from the main parade being at the Padang, it was also held at the heartland areas.

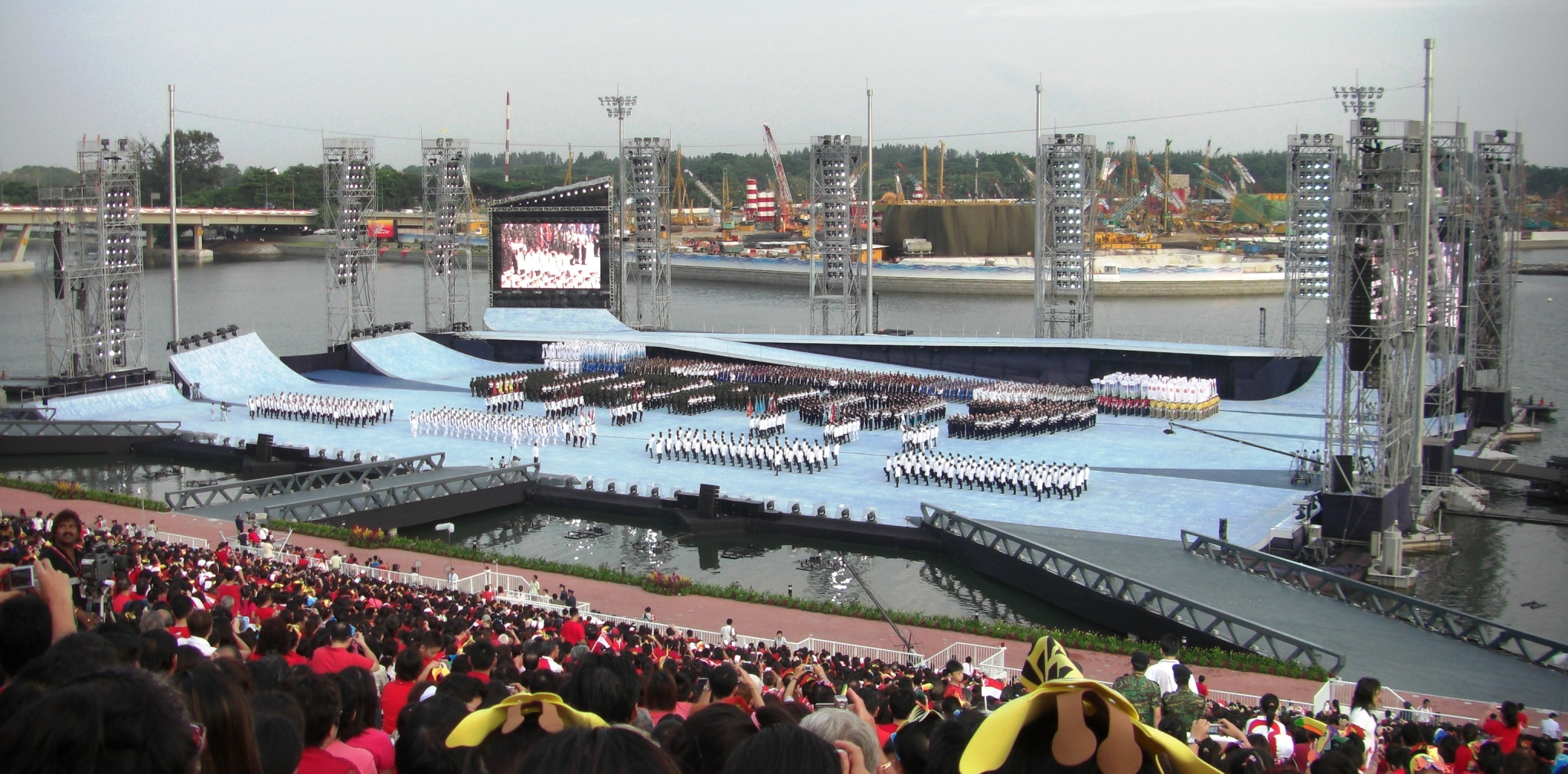
A scene of the 2007 parade at The Float.

On 16 October 2005, it was announced that due to the planned closure and replacement of the National Stadium as part of the Singapore Sports Hub project, the parade would be held there for the last time in 2006, and would move to The Float at Marina Bay—a temporary 27,000-seat grandstand and 130 m × 100 m (330 ft) (430 ft × 330 ft) floating platform in Marina Bay —for 2007. Despite offering a seating capacity almost less than half the capacity of the National Stadium, there was a vast area for approximately 150,000 additional spectators along the Marina Bay waterfront.

The 2013 installment featured a spin-off reality competition aired on Channel 5, titled Sing a Nation, which featured ten different groups who performed various songs for a chance at a lead performance for the 2013's parade. The 2013's theme song, "One Singapore", was also sung by the cast of Sing a Nation, and the song featured its largest ensemble, with 68 members.

The 2014 installment also featured its first female Red Lion parachutist to jump at the NDP, Third Warrant Officer Shirley Ng, after their initial performance in 2013 was cancelled due to weather conditions. The 2014 parade was notable as it was the last parade with the attendance for the first prime minister Lee Kuan Yew, who was the only member to have attended in every installment of NDP since 1966, as he died on 23 March the following year.

For 2015, portions of the festivities were held at Marina Bay, with screens simulcasting the parade at the Padang (held as part of the traditional five-year cycle, and to mark the 50th anniversary of independence), and the fireworks scheduled to be held at Marina Bay and the Marina Reservoir.

In 2016, the NDP was held for the first time at the new National Stadium, in an event that required modifications to the parade's format due to the limitations of the venue. After returning to the venue for 2017, in October 2017 it was announced that The Float would remain the "primary" venue of the NDP when not held at the Padang every five years, and would be redeveloped as a permanent venue known as NS Square. The decision raised questions over whether the costs of renting the National Stadium would diminish the legacy that the former National Stadium had as a site for community events. Contrarily, it was argued that not hosting the NDP at the new National Stadium would free up its schedule for major international sporting events, especially during the summer months.

For the 2018 parade, combat divers from the Republic of Singapore Navy performed free-fall water jumps, the first time during a National Day parade, alongside the Singapore Army's Red Lions. The Red Lions jumped at a record height of 3800m, the highest ever for an NDP and were in wingsuits for the first time.

The 2019 parade would be held at the Padang to commemorate the bicentennial of the founding of modern Singapore.

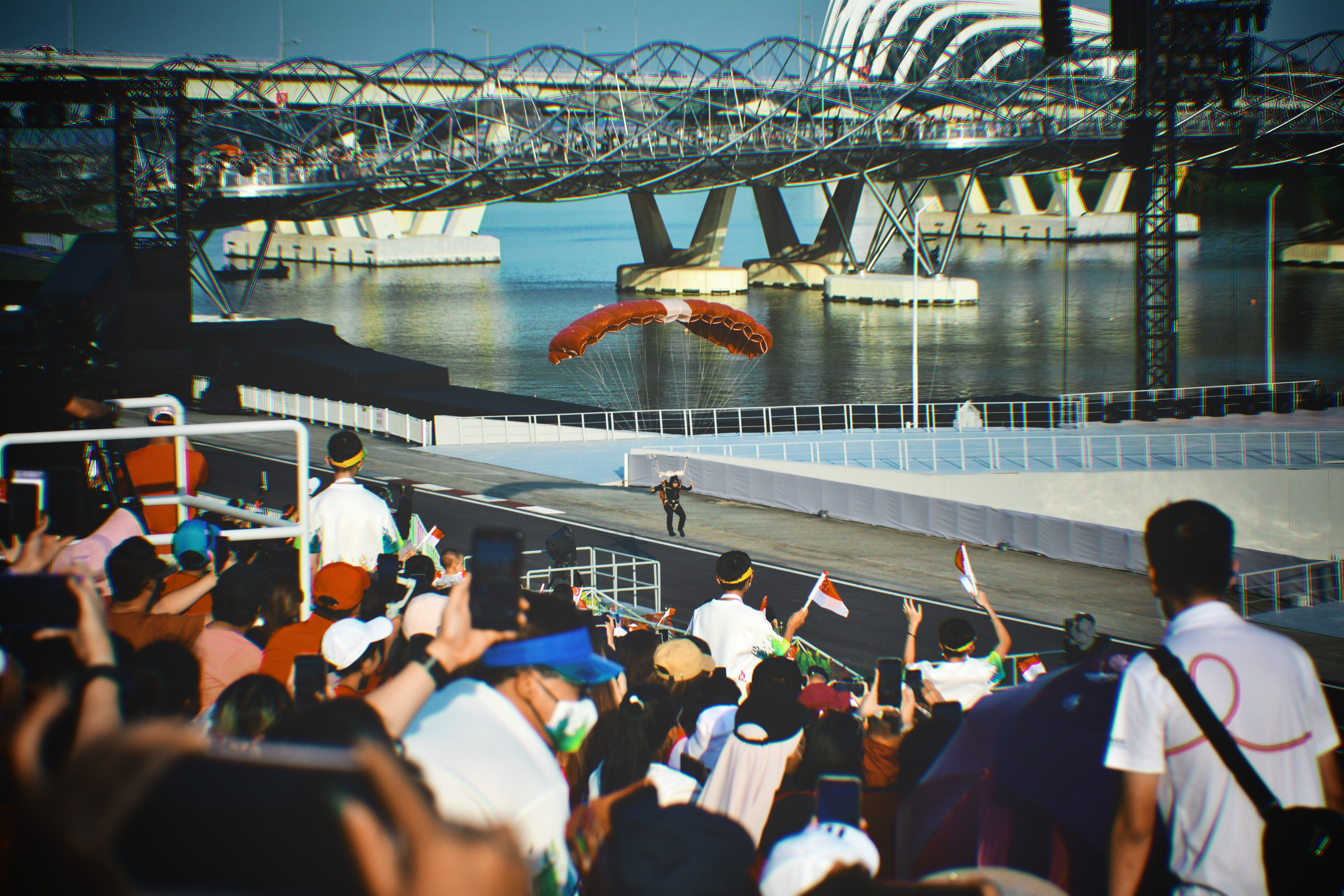
A Red Lions parachutist during the parade in 2022

Due to the ongoing COVID-19 pandemic in Singapore, the 2020 parade was replaced by a series of broadcast-only events, beginning with the Prime Minister's National Day Message and a downsized parade at the Padang. Appearances by the Mobile Column, Red Lions, and flyovers by F-15SG fighters were scheduled across Singapore, while the traditional Funpacks given at the parade were shipped to each resident. Online programming, home activity ideas, and social media campaigns were also organized. A cultural segment took place at the Star Performing Arts Centre in the evening, reduced to only around 100 performers with social distancing enforced. The organizers stated that they wanted to bring the event "across the island into every Singaporean's home".

In July 2021, it was announced that the 2021 parade would return to The Float in a downsized form. The event would be closed to the public and capped at 30% capacity, with tickets provided exclusively to "everyday heroes". All attendees were required to be fully-vaccinated for COVID-19 and test negative. On 22 July, due to the temporary reimplementation of Phase 2 "Heightened Alert" restrictions, it was announced that the parade would be postponed to 21 August. A closed "ceremonial" parade would be held on 9 August at The Float, which was stated to be similar in format to the previous year's parade.

It was announced that the 2022 parade would return to full capacity, with a goal to "involve as many Singaporeans" as possible. Some safety protocols would remain in place, such as a requirement for all attendees over 12 years of age, and all performers, to be fully-vaccinated. The parade would be the last edition held at The Float before its reconstruction as NS Square (which was expected to begin construction in 2023, and be completed by 2026); the 2023 parade would be held at the Padang, and plans were discussed to possibly hold the parade at National Stadium again in 2024.

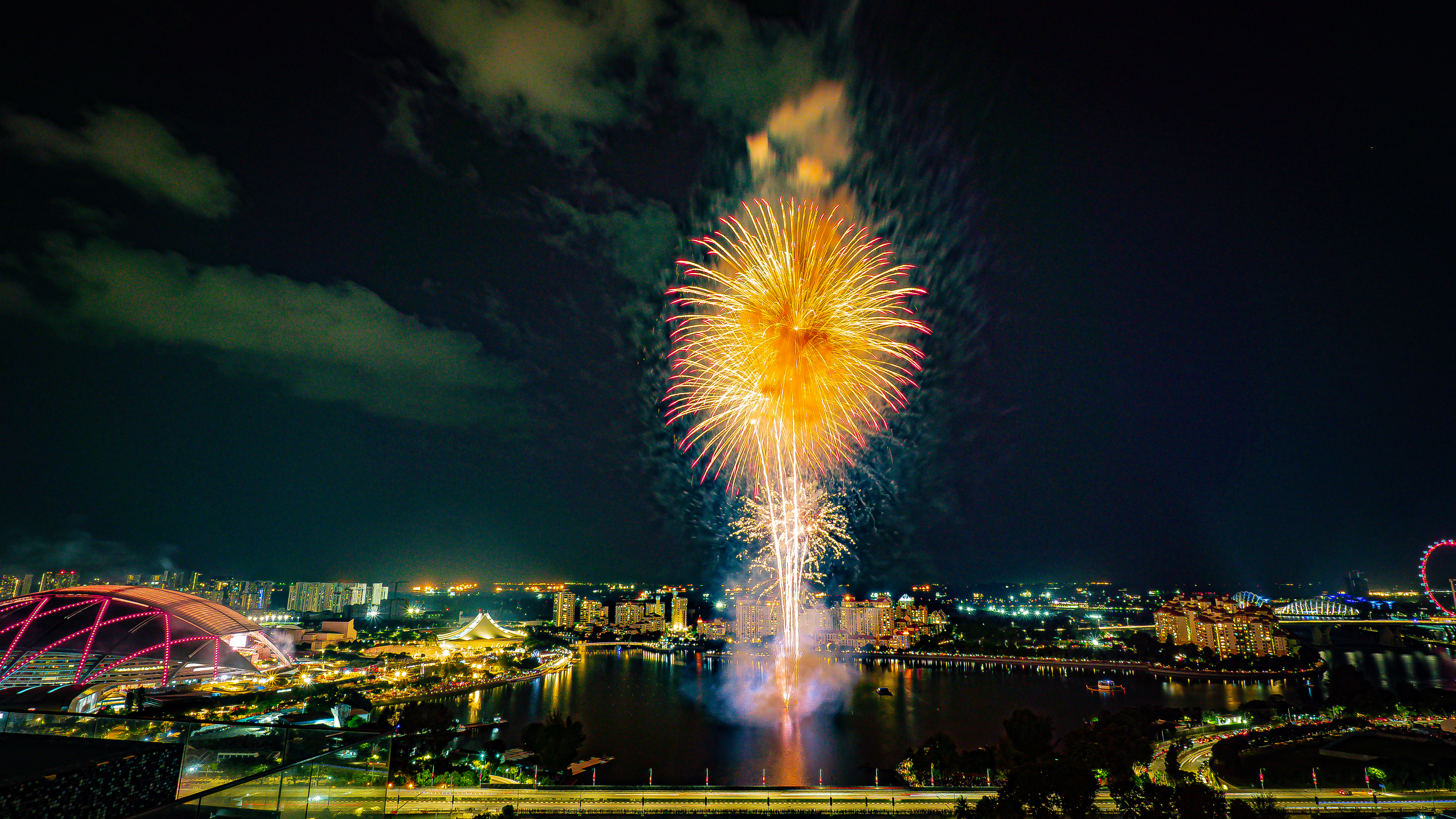
Fireworks at the end of National Day Parade 2026 that was held in the National Stadium (left)

In September 2023, it was announced that the parade would continue to be held at the Padang for 2024 and 2025, with these two editions marking the 40th anniversary of Total Defence and 60th anniversary of Singapore's independence respectively. Both parades were expected to include satellite events in Marina Bay and the heartland. On 19 August 2025, it was announced that the 2026 parade would return to the new National Stadium. On 25 August 2026, it was announced that the 2027 parade would return once more to the Padang to celebrate the 60 years of national service in Singapore.

== NDP editions ==
A historic venue for the parade has been The Padang, the site where Singapore's independence was declared. In 1976, the parade was held for the first time at the National Stadium, whose larger capacity allowed for more to view the parade live.

Although offering about 60,000 seats in the National Stadium, the demand for tickets remained high, resulting in several attempts to decentralise the event to bring the celebration closer to more Singaporeans. From 1975 to 1983, the NDP alternated between a decentralised event and one centred at the Padang or National Stadium. From 1984, the parade was held at the Padang every three years, with all other editions held at the National Stadium. This three-year cycle continued until 1994, when it switched to a five-year cycle beginning 1995. An exception came in 2019, when the NDP was held at the Padang to mark Singapore's bicentennial, and in 2023, where a series of three consecutive parades at the Padang began due to the construction of NS Square (including one held in 2025 per the five-year cycle).

The Padang, although historically important, posed a greater logistical challenge and also offered fewer seats for spectators. The event and rehearsals also required the closing of surrounding roads, and the construction of temporary spectator stands around the field. The site, however, was the only feasible venue for the mobile column, as the heavy vehicles could not be driven onto the National Stadium track. The Padang was used as the main performance venue for the 2005 parade, with other activities held in Marina South, Jurong East, Yishun and Tampines.

Several alternate locations were mooted, including the utilization of the Padang, which is physically bigger and less likely to disrupt daily functions in the city. In 2010, the Padang was used again as the main performance with other activities held at Bishan, Eunos, Woodlands, Sengkang and Choa Chu Kang.

| Year | Venue | Theme | Slogan/Tagline | Organiser | Creative Director | Theme Song | Ref |
|---|---|---|---|---|---|---|---|
| 1966–1974 | Padang | | | | | | |
| 1975 | Decentralised sites | | | | | | |
| 1976 | National Stadium | | | 2nd Singapore Infantry Brigade | | | |
| 1977 | Decentralised sites | | | | | | |
| 1978 | Padang | | | | | | |
| 1979 | Decentralised sites | | | | | | |
| 1980 | National Stadium | Courtesy – Our Way of Life | | | | | |
| 1981 | Decentralised sites | Energy is Precious – Save It | | | | | |
| 1982 | Padang | | | 2nd Singapore Infantry Brigade | | | |
| 1983 | Decentralised sites | | | | | | |
| 1984 | Padang | 25 Years of Nation Building, 1959–1984 | Reach Out Singapore | 3rd Singapore Infantry Brigade | | "Stand Up for Singapore" | |
| 1985 | National Stadium | | | 7th Singapore Infantry Brigade | | "Stand Up for Singapore" | |
| 1986 | National Stadium | | Together...Excellence for Singapore | 2nd Singapore Infantry Brigade | | "Count on Me Singapore" | |
| 1987 | Padang | | A Nation For All: Towards Excellence for Singapore | 3rd Singapore Infantry Brigade | | "We are Singapore" | |
| 1988 | National Stadium | | Excellence Together, Singapore Forever | Singapore Artillery | | | |
| 1989 | National Stadium | | Excellence Together, Singapore Forever | 2nd Singapore Infantry Brigade | | | |
| 1990 | Padang | One People, One Nation, One Singapore | NDP 1990: A Nation on Parade | HQ Armour | | "One People, One Nation, One Singapore" | |
| 1991 | National Stadium | | My Singapore | HQ Singapore Combat Engineers | | "It's the Little Things" | |
| 1992 | National Stadium | | My Singapore | Singapore Air Defense Artillery | | | |
| 1993 | Padang | Nation on Parade | My Singapore, My Home | HQ Armour | | | |
| 1994 | National Stadium | | My Singapore, My Home | 7th Singapore Infantry Brigade | | | |
| 1995 | Padang | 30 Years of Nationhood / My Singapore, My Home: A Nation in Harmony | My Singapore, My Home | HQ Armour | | | |
| 1996 | National Stadium | | My Singapore, My Home | HQ Singapore Combat Engineers | | | |
| 1997 | National Stadium | Catch the Rainbow! NDP 1997 Musical Extravaganza | NDP 1997: My Singapore, Our Future | Singapore Artillery | | | |
| 1998 | National Stadium | | Our Singapore, Our Future | 7th Singapore Infantry Brigade | | "Home" "City for the World" | |
| 1999 | National Stadium | Our People | Together We Make The Difference | 6th Division | | "Together" | |
| 2000 | Padang | | Together We Make The Difference | 3rd Division | | "Shine on Me" | |
| 2001 | National Stadium | Building Bridges, Forging Futures | Together We Make The Difference | 9th Division | | "Where I Belong" | |
| 2002 | National Stadium | A Caring Nation | Together, A New Singapore | HQ Armour | Dick Lee | 'We Will Get There" | |
| 2003 | National Stadium | A Cohesive Society | Together, A New Singapore | HQ Guards | Glen Goei | "One United People" | |
| 2004 | National Stadium | A Progressive Society | Together, A New Singapore | 6th Division | Glen Goei | "Home" | |
| 2005 | Padang (Note: While the main parade is at Padang, it was also held at the different Heartland Areas.) | 40 Years of Nation Building | The Future is Ours to Make | 3rd Division | Glen Goei | "Reach Out for the Skies" | |
| 2006 | National Stadium | Our Global City, Our Home | | HQ Guards | Glen Goei | "My Island Home" | |
| 2007 | The Float @ Marina Bay | City of Possibilities | | HQ Singapore Combat Engineers | Goh Boon Teck | "Will You" "There's No Place I Rather Be" | |
| 2008 | The Float @ Marina Bay | Celebrating the Singapore Spirit | | HQ Guards | Goh Boon Teck | "Shine for Singapore" | |
| 2009 | The Float @ Marina Bay | Come Together – Reaching Out • Reaching Up | | 3rd Division | Ivan Heng | "What Do You See" | |
| 2010 | Padang | Live Our Dreams, Fly Our Flag | | HQ Armour | Dick Lee | "Song for Singapore" | |
| 2011 | The Float @ Marina Bay | Majulah! The Singapore Spirit | | HQ Singapore Combat Engineers | Beatrice Chia-Richmond | "In a Heartbeat" | |
| 2012 | The Float @ Marina Bay | Loving Singapore, Our Home | | HQ Guards | Fan Dong Kai | "Love at First Light" | |
| 2013 | The Float @ Marina Bay | Many Stories... One Singapore | | 3rd Division | Selena Tan | "One Singapore" | |
| 2014 | The Float @ Marina Bay | Our People, Our Home | | 6th Division | Dick Lee | "We Will Get There" | |
| 2015 | Padang | Majulah Singapura | Our Golden Jubilee | HQ Guards | Dick Lee | "Our Singapore" | |
| 2016 | New National Stadium | Building Our Singapore of Tomorrow | | HQ Armour | Beatrice Chia-Richmond | "Tomorrow's Here Today" | |
| 2017 | The Float @ Marina Bay | #OneNationTogether | | HQ Singapore Combat Engineers | Goh Boon Teck | "Because It's Singapore!" | |
| 2018 | The Float @ Marina Bay | We Are Singapore | | 3rd Division | Boo Jun Feng | "We are Singapore" | |
| 2019 | Padang | Our Singapore | | HQ Armour | Dick Lee | "Our Singapore" | |
| 2020 | Decentralised sites (Note: A scaled-down morning parade was held at the Padang, while the evening culture segment was held at The Star Performing Arts Centre.) | Together, A Stronger Singapore | | 3rd Division | Royston Tan | "Everything I Am" | |
| 2021 | The Float @ Marina Bay | Together, Our Singapore Spirit | | HQ Guards | Boo Jun Feng | "The Road Ahead" | |
| 2022 | The Float @ Marina Bay | Stronger Together, Majulah! | | 3rd Division | Adrian Pang | "Stronger Together" | |
| 2023 | Padang (Note: In 2025, while the main performance was at Padang, it was also expanded to the Marina Bay area.) | Onward as One | | Singapore Combat Engineers | Royston Tan | "Shine Your Light" | |
| 2024 | Padang | Together, As One United People | | HQ Guards | Brian Gothong Tan | "Not Alone" | |
| 2025 | Padang | Majulah Singapura | | 3rd Division | Boo Jun Feng | "Here We Are" | |
| 2026 | New National Stadium | Majulah Singapura, Go Beyond | | HQ Armour | Brian Gothong Tan | "Giants"; "Sparkle"; "You'll Be Okay" | |
| 2027 | Padang | | | Singapore Combat Engineers | | | |

== Parade sequence ==
Although the programme and sequence of the parade do change over the years, several components and the overall flow of the parade have remained intact for the past four decades. With the shifting of venues for some editions of the parade, or in cases such as wet weather, programmes may have to cancel or introduce slight modifications in order to suit the changes, for instance the Mobile Column, which is only possible both at the Padang site and at Marina Bay.

=== Pre-parade ===
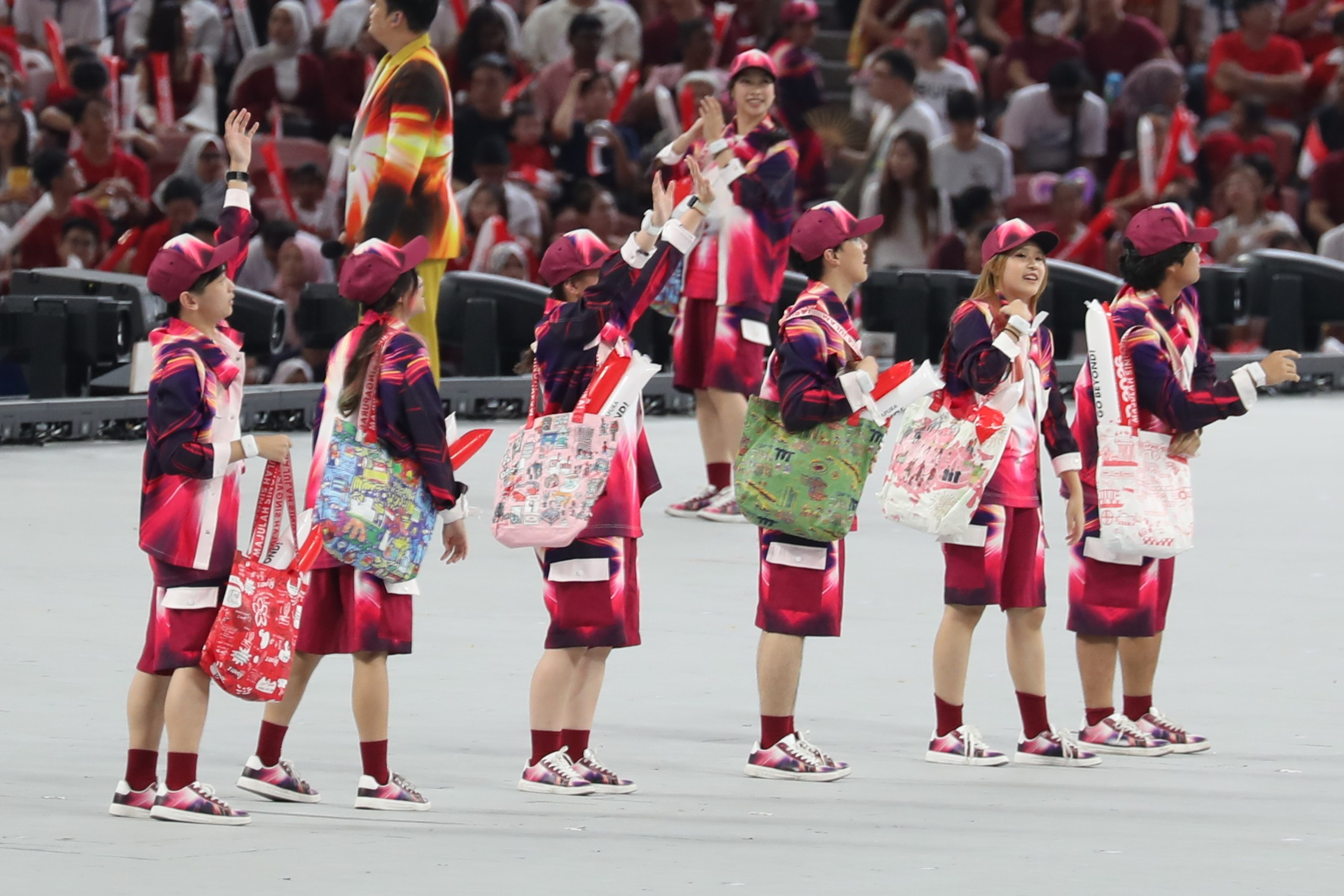
Motivators from Touch Community Services introducing the Fun Pack to the audiences at National Day Parade 2026

The pre-parade segment today may include mass-displays, choir performances, school band displays, sky-diving displays, and other light-hearted performances to entertain the crowd prior to the parade proper, with the added positive effect of encouraging parade-attendees to be seated earlier. Initially introduced on an ad hoc basis as an informal filler, it has since become an integral part of the parade particularly when live television coverage was extended to this segment in recent years. As audience participation has become a part of the parade, the pre-parade segment also becomes an opportunity for the hosts to lead and rehearse with the audience actions they may have to do when the parade proper begins.

Motivators from TOUCH Community Services were introduced to the pre-parade in 2002 (then called Anchor Talents). TOUCH Community Services has since moved on to mentoring students from the various Institutes of Technical Education (ITEs) and various Polytechnics since 2003 until the present, under the Leadership & Mentoring programme. Colourful costumes and dance moves have been designed for the motivators.

=== Parade and ceremonies ===
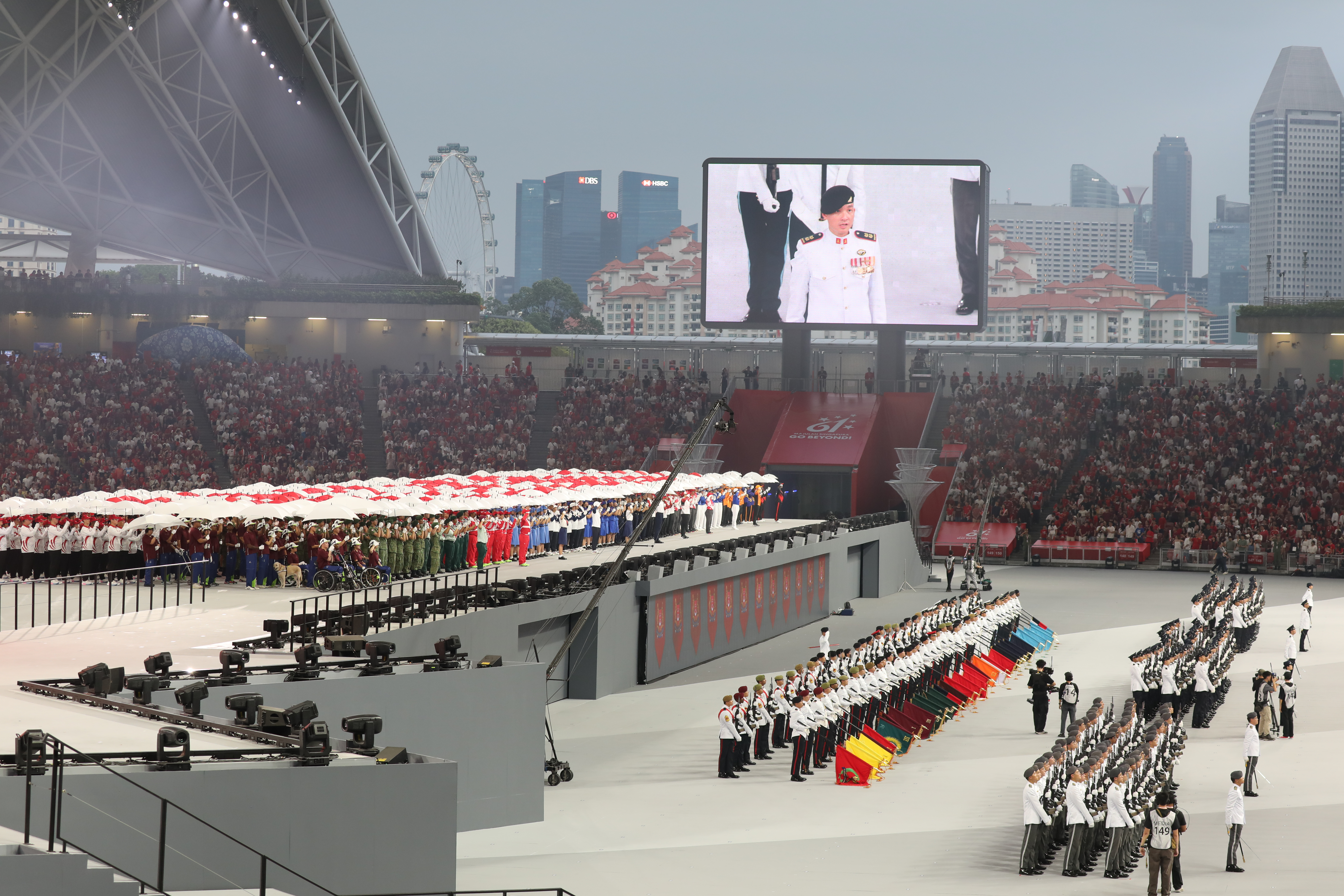
Participants from the different groups and associations coming together to form the Parade & Ceremony segment at National Day 2026

The parade has been a traditional segment of the National Day Parade. Participants of the parade include members of the Singapore Armed Forces, Singapore Police Force, Singapore Civil Defence Force, representatives of the People's Action Party, different labour unions (including members of the National Trades Union Congress) and Ministries as well as students in uniformed groups (such as the National Cadet Corps (Singapore), National Police Cadet Corps, National Civil Defence Cadet Corps, the Singapore Red Cross, the Boys' Brigade in Singapore and Girls' Brigade Singapore, Singapore Scout Association, Girl Guides Singapore and St John Singapore) and representatives of various Singapore business entities and public and private organizations.

Participants of the parade proper are split into two main sections: the Guard-of-Honour contingents and the Supporting Contingents. The six Guard-of-Honour contingents are made up of members from the four arms of the Singapore Armed Forces (the Singapore Army, represented by the Best Combat Unit, for many years the 1st Commando Battalion (1CDO) of the Singapore Army; the Republic of Singapore Navy, represented by the Naval Diving Unit (NDU); the Republic of Singapore Air Force, represented by the Air Power Generation Command (APGC); and the Digital and Intelligence Service) as well as the Singapore Police Force, represented by the Training Command (TRACOM), and the Singapore Civil Defence Force. All members of these contingents are dressed in their respective ceremonial uniforms, known as the No. 1 uniform. Behind the Guard-of-Honour contingents stand the Regimental Colours Party, where the 37 SAF regimental colours are held by a group of junior officers, known as ensigns, from the Singapore Armed Forces, with their armed escorts (until 1997 Service Regimental Colours from the SAF's three services led the colours party). The 4 State Colours are in front of the Air Force Guard-of-Honour contingents and are formed by Escorts (Specialists/Junior Military Experts) and Ensigns (Junior Officers/Subaltern-ranked Military Experts).

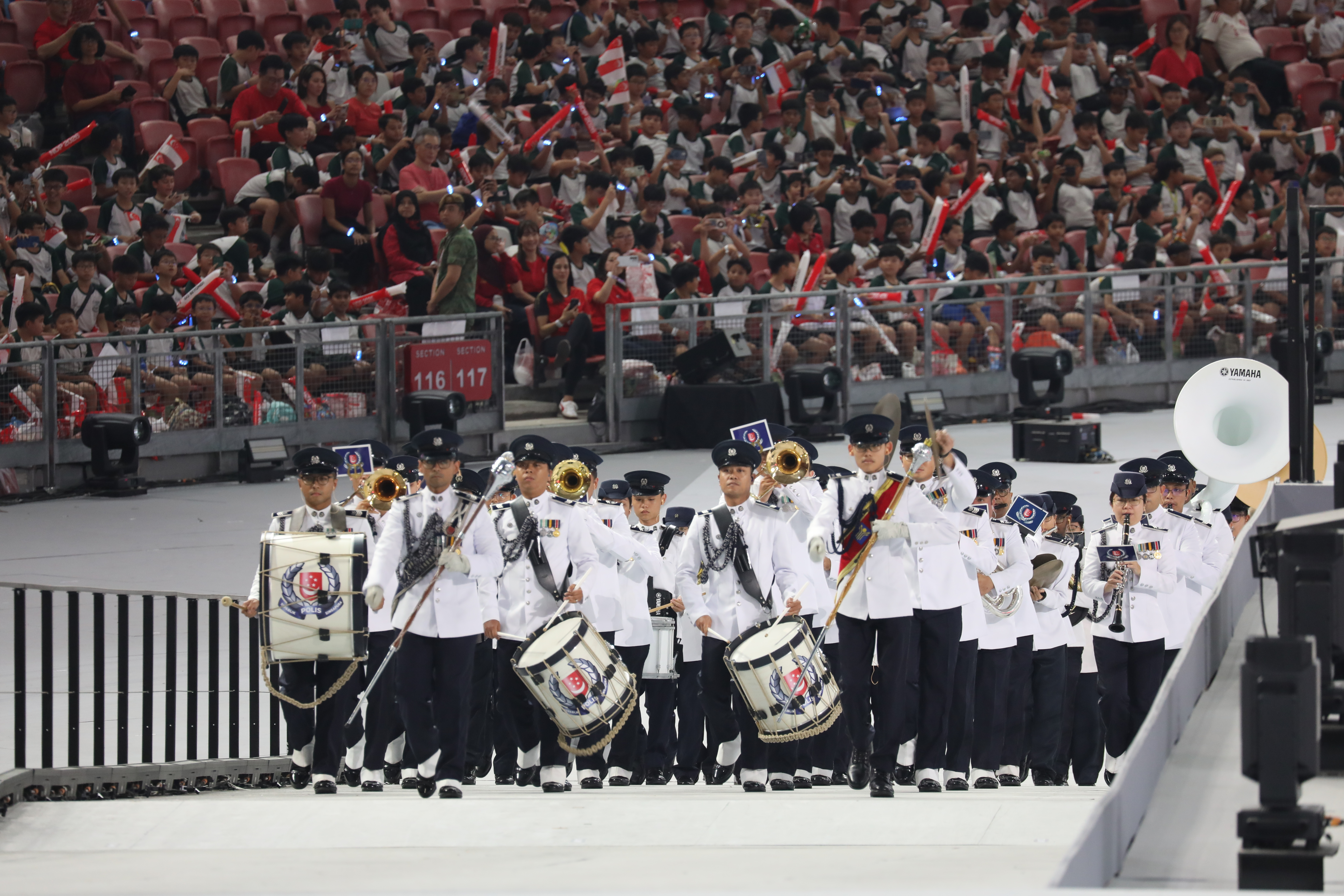
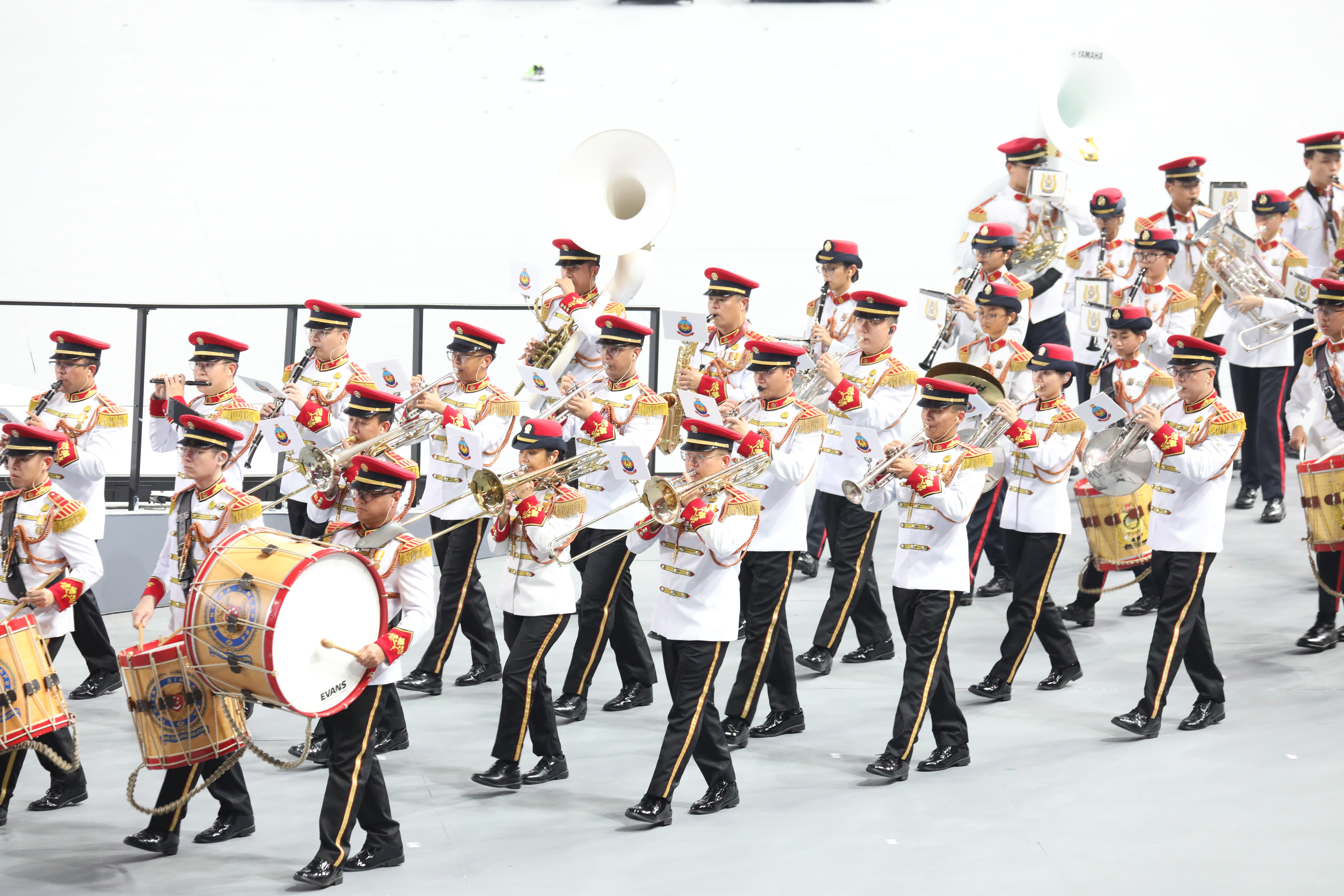
Members from the Singapore Police Force (SPF) Band, National Police Cadet Corps (NPCC) Band (top), Singapore Armed Forces (SAF) Central Band & the Singapore National Cadet Corps (NCC) Command Band (bottom) marching and playing their instruments together

The parade's military bands are from both the SAF and SPF, and in recent years, the marching bands of both services' cadet organizations (the Singapore National Cadet Corps Command Band from Swiss Cottage Secondary School, and the National Police Cadet Corps Band from Yishun Town Secondary School) have joined them as well, with the Singapore NCC Command Band being part of the combined band since 2010 and the NPCC Band in 2012. Before the 1994 creation of the SAF Bands the different service arms of the SAF fielded their own bands, and the massed bands for the parade were, since the early 1970s, from a select band of the SAF and the Singapore Police Force Band (inter-service massed bands would only happen in 1987).

The parade traditionally starts with the Parade Regimental Sergeant Major (Parade RSM) forming up the parade on either the Padang, the field of the National Stadium or in front of the NS Square grandstand. The command of the parade is handed over to the Parade Commander once the parade has been formed up and properly dressed accordingly. Typically, both the Parade RSM and the Parade Commander come from the SAF, and usually hold a minimum rank of Master Warrant Officer, and Lieutenant Colonel respectively. Upon sizing and forming up the parade to full formation, the Parade Commander will wait for the arrival of the members of Parliament, members of the Cabinet and the Prime Minister of Singapore, in that order (the salutes were dropped partially in 2008, and the Prime Minister's salute was dropped the next year). Upon the arrival of each group, the parade will present its salute and present arms, except for the Parliament and Cabinet members, upon which they stand at attention and only the PC salutes them. During the Prime Minister’s Salute, the regimental colours will only be dipped, while the state colours will not.

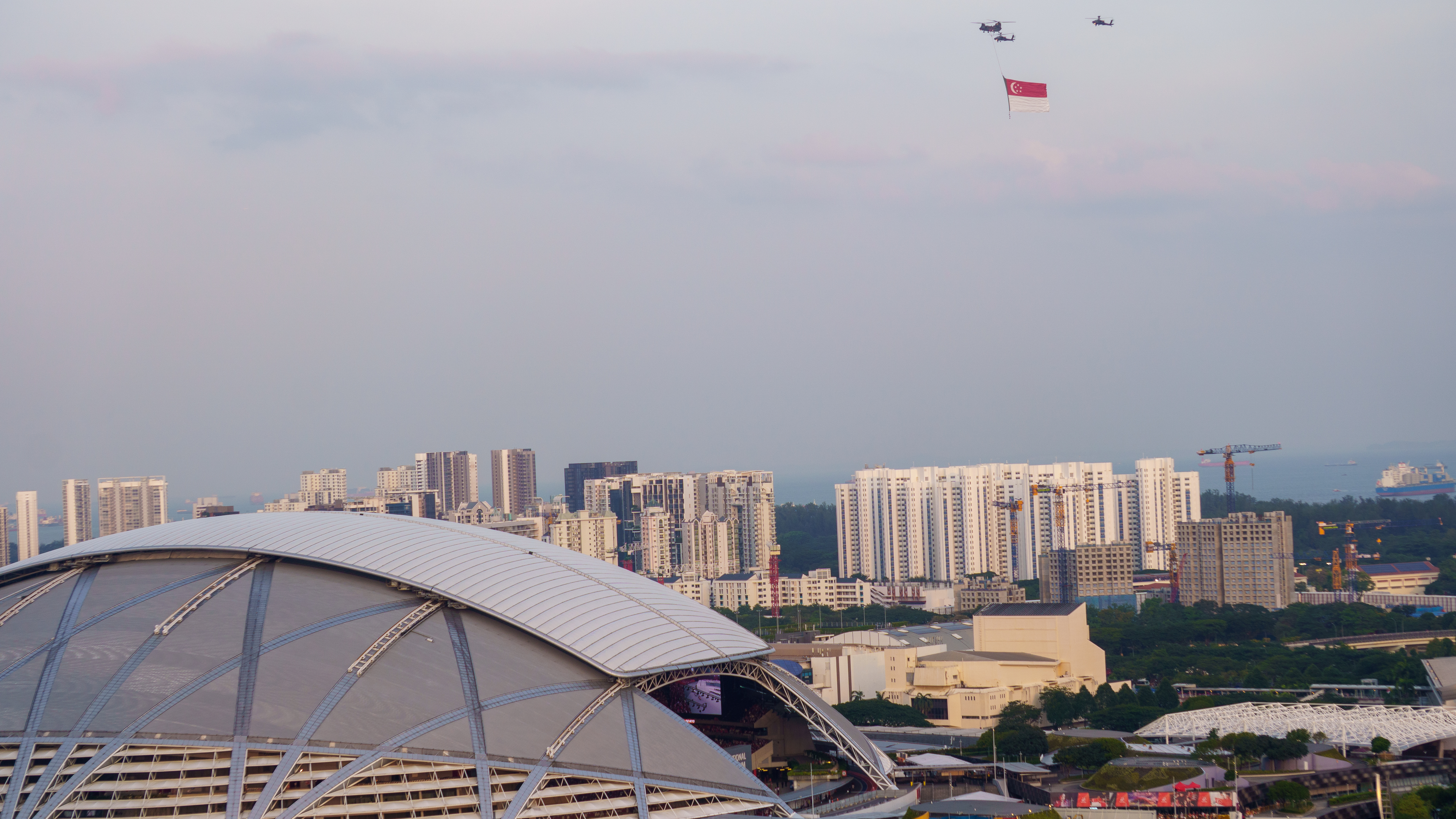
Fly-past of the State Flag over the parade venue in 2026

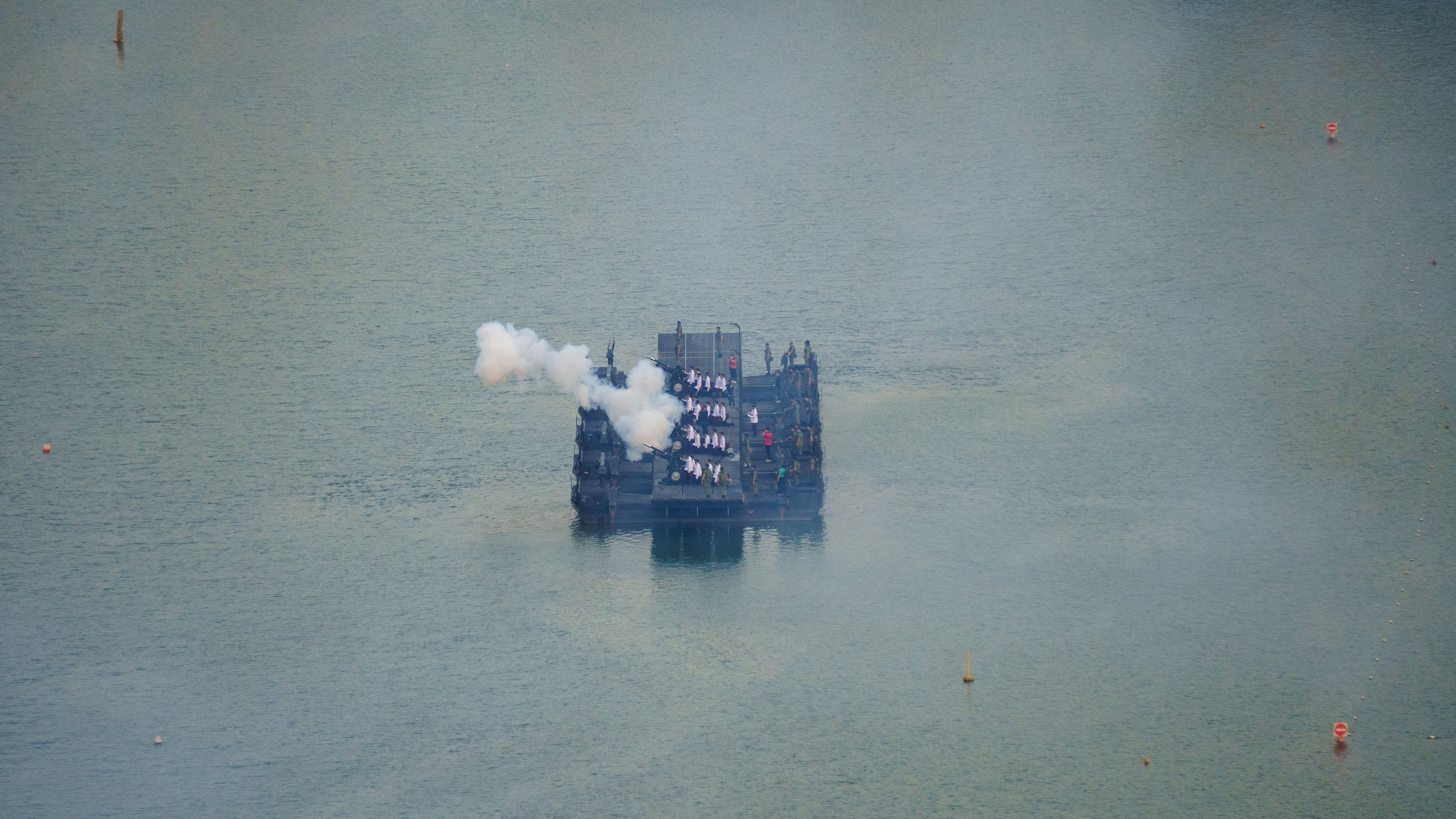
21-gun salute in progress

Lastly once the President of Singapore has arrived (after the playing of the Presidential Fanfare by the Fanfare Trumpeters of the SAF), the Parade Commander will call for a full (Presidential) salute 'present arms', during which the National Anthem, Majulah Singapura, will be played accompanied by a fly-past of the State Flag. During this moment, both state and regiment colours will be dipped when saluting. Concurrently, the Presidential Standard is unfurled using the 'quick release knot' technique from the top of a flagpole, signifying the presence of the President at the event. After that (and the following aerial salute by the RSAF), the Parade Commander will request that the President inspects the parade. During this inspection, the President will be accompanied by the Chief of Defence Force and the Parade Commander, and the Army GOH Contingent Commander would later join them once they approach the Guard-of-Honour (recent parades have seen a motorized inspection by the President while riding a Land Rover). A presidential 21-gun salute is also given to the President during this time by a select battery from the Singapore Artillery. It is customary that the President speaks to some members of the Guard-of-honor contingents as he/she passes by. After the inspection ends, the President will return to the podium before the Guard-of-honor contingents presents a Feu-de-Joie led by the Parade Commander.

At the end of it (with the GOH contingents now at shoulder arms), the Parade Commander will ask the President for permission for the Parade Marchpast to start. 2012's edition formally included an Advance in Review order to the proceedings for the first time.

==== Marchpast ====
The Parade Commander will command the Parade contingents to prepare for the Marchpast, and will then march out of the Parade Grounds, with the massed bands bringing the rear. Since the 1990s, Tentera Singapura is the first march played in this segment, followed by the Polis Repablik Singapura March. In the National Day Parade 2009, there was a City Marchpast where the contingents marched around the Central Business District, with the march ending at the F1 Pit Building. In the National Day Parade 2010, the City Marchpast made its second appearance and this time the Marina Bay area was the venue for this, with the Marina Padang as the final stop on the march past. 2011 saw the reinstatement of the march through the stands moment of the supporting contingents of the SAF, SPF and SCDF (previously done in the 2002 edition and now called the Onward March), and that year the participants of the youth uniformed groups and the civilian contingents marched out in a different way, only for all of them to reunite for the City Marchpast later on. The 2012 edition of the parade, the first National Day Parade officiated by the President Tony Tan Keng Yam, had the Onward March which was now done for the second time by all of the youth uniformed groups present while the military and civilian supporting contingents marched out in a different way similar to the march pasts during the 2000 and 2010 editions with all of them rejoining for the City Marchpast to be done later with the GOH contingent battalion to Marina Bay Sands where the march ended. The Onward March made yet another appearance in the 2014 edition alongside the City Marchpast after the parade proper towards the MBS complex. The City Marchpast made its sixth consecutive appearance in the 2015 edition and was carried on in 2016 together with the Onward March from the new National Stadium and again from Marina Bay in 2017 and 2018. In 2024 the Onward March made its official Padang debut.

In recent years the order of the march past of the supporting contingents out of the grounds has been altered, with the military and civil uniformed services first to march out, followed by the economic firms, social organizations and the youth uniformed organizations which march last out and then into the platform, parade stands or in the streets.

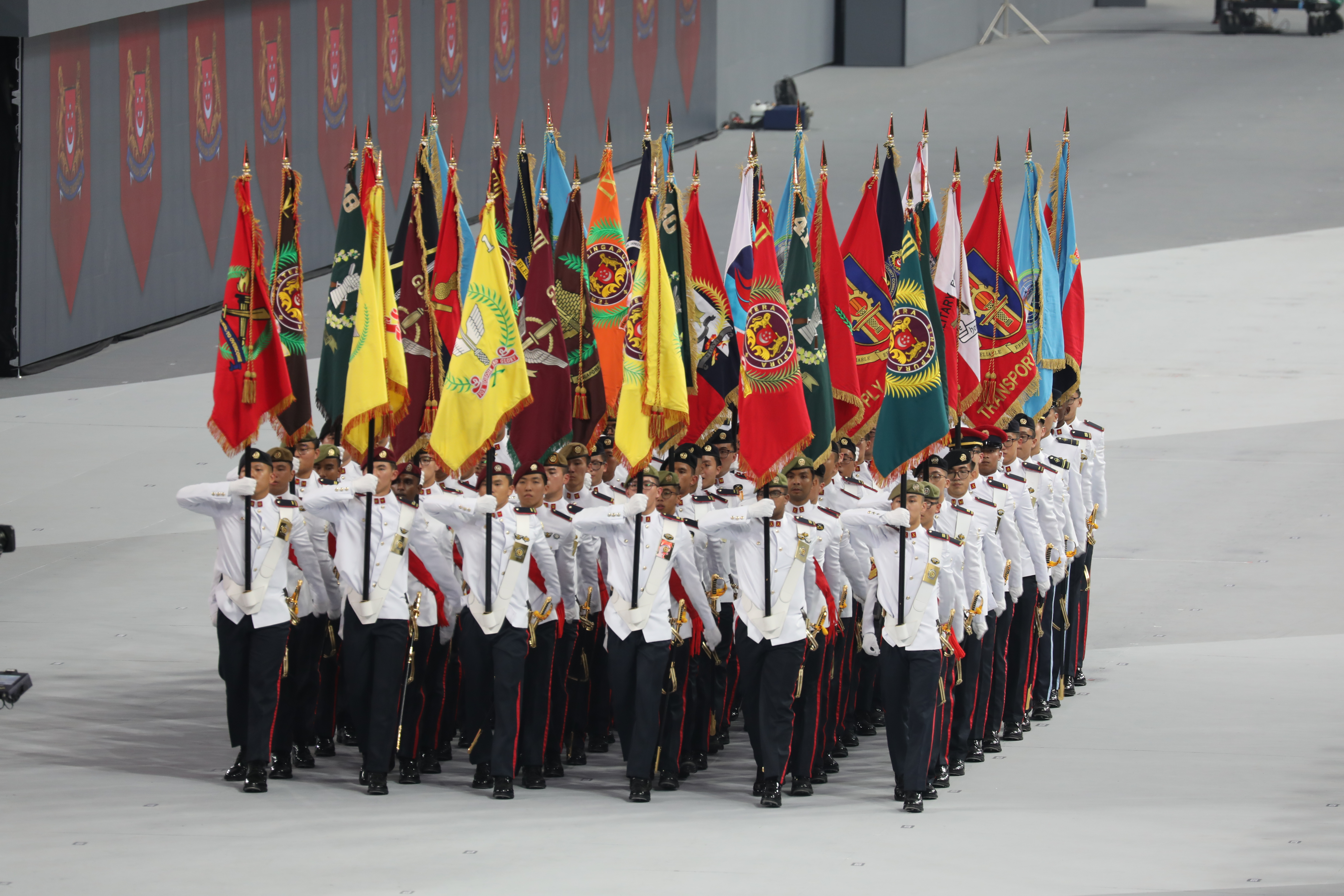
Regimental Colours marching past after saluting the President of Singapore

===== Full order of marchpast =====
Following the parade commander and the second in command, the order of the march past in quick time is as follows, as it would have been during the 70s and early 80s when at the Padang and National Stadium:

- Colour Party
- Guards of Honour Contingents (all six as of 2025)
- 1st Commando Battalion
- Officer Cadet School
- Specialist Cadet School
- Singapore Army
  - Divisional and brigade companies of Singapore Infantry Regiment
    - 3rd Division
    - 6th Division
    - 9th Division/Infantry
  - Guards
  - Armour
  - Singapore Artillery
  - Signals
  - Combat Engineers
  - 2 People's Defence Force
- Navy
- Air Force
- Military Police Command
- Digital and Intelligence Service
- Medical Corps
- SAF Volunteer Corps
- Singapore Police Force
  - Divisional company
  - Home Team Academy police cadets
  - Gurkha Contingent
  - Police Coast Guard
  - SPF Special Operations
  - Volunteer Special Constabulary
- Singapore Civil Defence Force
  - HTA civil defence cadets
  - Divisional company
- Immigration and Checkpoints Authority
- Singapore Customs
- National Cadet Corps (mixed regiment)
  - Land battalion (one male and one female company each)
  - Naval company
  - Air company
- National Police Cadet Corps
- National Civil Defence Corps
- Scout Association
- Girl Guides Singapore
- Red Cross Youth
- St. John's Ambulance Brigade
- Boys Brigade
- Girls Brigade
- SAFRA National Service Association
- Parade contingents of Singapore higher educational institutions
  - Universities contingents
  - Polytechnics contingents
  - Junior colleges contingents
- Parade contingents of Singapore secondary schools
- People's Action Party and PAP Community Foundation
- National Trades Union Congress
- Contingents of government ministries
- Contingents of national statutory boards and state owned corporations
- Contingents of public and private NGOs and other organizations
- Contingents of private local and foreign corporations
- Singapore National Olympic Council and Sport Singapore (as unified #OneTeamSG contingent since 2010s)

==== Mobile column, flypast and defence exposition ====
In the 1966 NDP, a prototype of the mobile column took part with 25-pounder saluting guns, signals equipment and police vehicles. The first true Mobile Column was organized in 1969 which displayed the then newly acquired armour vehicles of the SAF, the RSP's police vehicles and the SCDF's fire trucks. In 1990, after a three-year hiatus since the parade of 1987, the Mobile Column returned as part of the silver jubilee of Singapore's independence with veterans from the Indonesia-Malaysia confrontation and retired personnel from the 1967–68 NS intakes first up, transported on trucks. It has been on show during the more important milestone anniversaries of the nation's birthday, on parades held in Padang every five years, including in 2019, 2020, 2023, 2025, 2027 & 2030. In 2019 and 2020, the vehicles forming the column drove across various areas of the city-state, letting residents and visitors see the equipment upclose in their communities as the column would drive thru their homes and workplaces.

Almost every NDP since 1971 (except 2016 and 2026) has had a flypast segment featuring jet and training aircraft, transports and helicopters from the Republic of Singapore Air Force. A naval review of naval vessels and maritime assets of all uniformed organizations was present in the parades of 1990, 1993 and 2025, and was held as a separate event in 2000.

Whenever the NDP is held at The Float in Marina Bay/NS Square the Mobile Column and flypast, as well as the occasional fleet review, both evolve into the multi-platform and multi-service Dynamic Defence Display (D3), with a display of the military defence and public security capabilities of the uniformed services. In lieu of the 2018 D3, as part of the parade and ceremony segment of the program, a special flypast of the RSAF was held in that year's edition to mark its golden jubilee. The D3 would have its Padang debut (combined with the traditional Mobile Column) in 2024.

The 1980 parade marchpast segment in the Former National Stadium ended with a small civilian mobile column featuring classic cars, bicycles and motorcycles seen on Singapore's roads in the past.

=== Show segment ===
==== Highlights ====
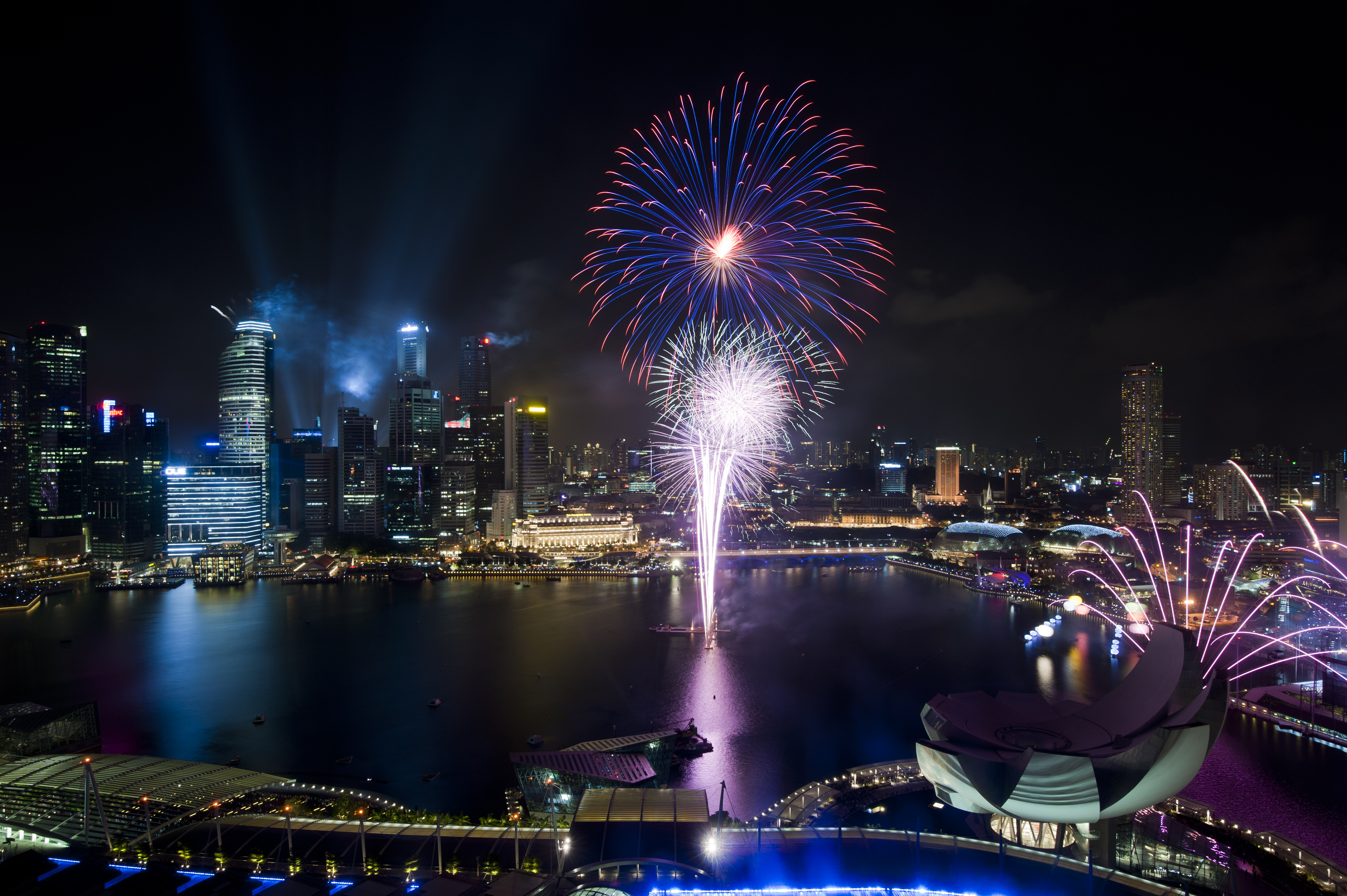
Fireworks during parade day in 2011

The spectacular show segment follows the traditional parade and ceremony, and lasts normally for 45 minutes. Following the theme of the parade that year, the Show will feature (aside from a Prologue in recent editions) three to four (sometimes up to six) main Acts that culminates in a Grand Finale, that will usually feature the theme song of that year's parade, followed by the much anticipated fireworks display. The entire parade will end in a chorus of voices singing familiar National Day Songs, mass pledge taking (from 2009 expanded into a national activity) and the singing of the National Anthem. In 2007, the parade broke tradition for having a fireworks display that synchronized with the Sing Singapore medley in the finale. In 2009, for the first time ever, all the segments of the NDP have been merged into one integrated program; this would later be repeated in 2015.

It has its origins in early NDPs as various mass display items put up by community groups or schools to add colour to the otherwise military parade. These items revolved around the themes of racial harmony, ruggedness among youths etc., which are represented by ethnic dances and mass gymnastics displays. This section evolved over the years to become more theatrical, from the massive card stunt displays that complemented the parade in the 1980s to multimedia projections in recent Shows, as well as the theatrical show segments of the 1996, 1997 and 2011 editions, which featured local artists. In recent parades, the performances have been interspected with short movies produced for the parade by local film makers, in 2021 the short movie segments became animated, a first in the history of the show segment.

Float displays also featured prominently in the Show segments of the 1970s and 1980s where floats were designed to promote government campaigns or highlight the works of various public and private companies. This returned in the editions of 1991, 1993 and 1998 and in NDP 2005 as a visual representation of Singapore's past 40 years of nation building, with further reappearances at NDP 2009 and at NDP 2010 to symbolize the mixture of peoples that make up Singapore today. Floats would return in the 2015, 2017, 2019, 2023 and 2026 editions. Boats and floats on the Marina Bay area in view of the crowds were one of the highlights of the 1993 and 2018 show segments.

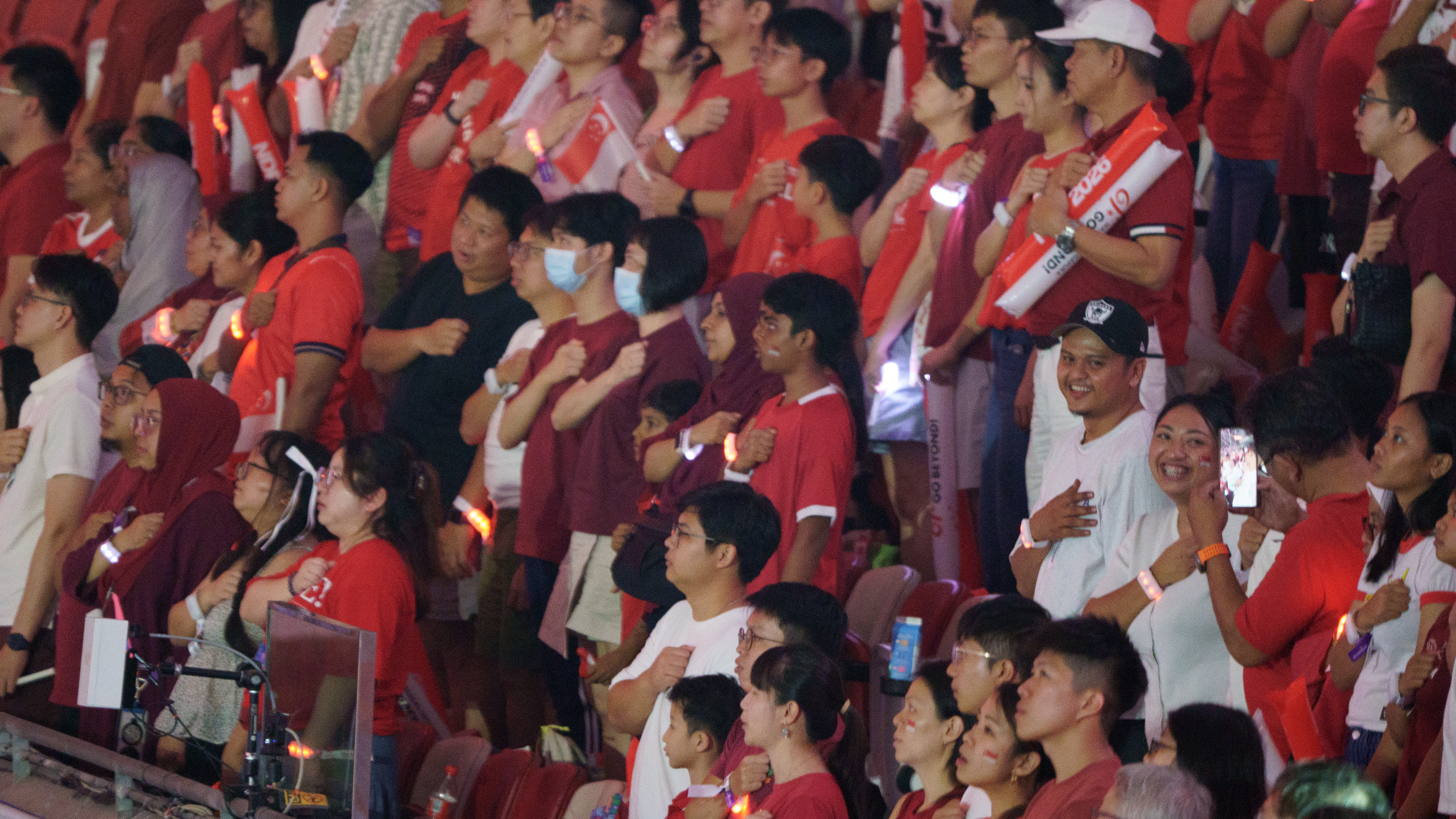
Audience at the 2026 parade reciting the pledge

Parades today, held from dusk to night, end in the climax of fireworks displays which have become a prominent feature in every parade, which followed by a medley of songs and then reciting the pledge and singing "Majulah Singapura". However, in the early parades that were held in the day (from 1965 to 1972) and later afternoon to evening NDP editions from 1973 to 1980, 1982 and 1984, mass lion and dragon dance displays are actually the parade finale. Lion and dragon dance troupes from various community centres and clan associations would gather on the field to the resonating sound of drumbeats to put on a fiery display that end the parade on an auspicious note, joined by flag dancers. These troupes later became integral parts of the 1985, 1990 and 1993 NDPs.

==== Participating organizations ====
Though every show would see the participation of an assortment of public and private companies, there are three main anchors taking on each Act in the show segment. They are the Peoples' Association and the PA Youth Movement (which involvement started in 1984, and one of the founding participants), the Soka Gakkai Singapore (SGS) (active since the 1970s) and the Ministry of Education, which would be represented by an individual institution or a cluster of schools, and also a founding participant of the parades since the first in 1966. The latter also provides the Combined Schools Band and the Combined School Choirs, another regular part of the NDP itself, and since the 1980s has been part of the national celebrations. The CSC became a virtual pre-recorded segment of the parade from 2020 onwards. The Ministry also provides the School Display Band for the pre-parade segment of the programme, coming from one of the many schools in the island country pre-selected for performance in the event. Occasionally the SDB is made up of select bands from Singapore high schools. Since 2016, volunteers from Team Nila are also involved as Precinct Ushers, Safety Management Aides and, most recently, as pre-show Active Health Ambassadors.

==== Multimedia show ====
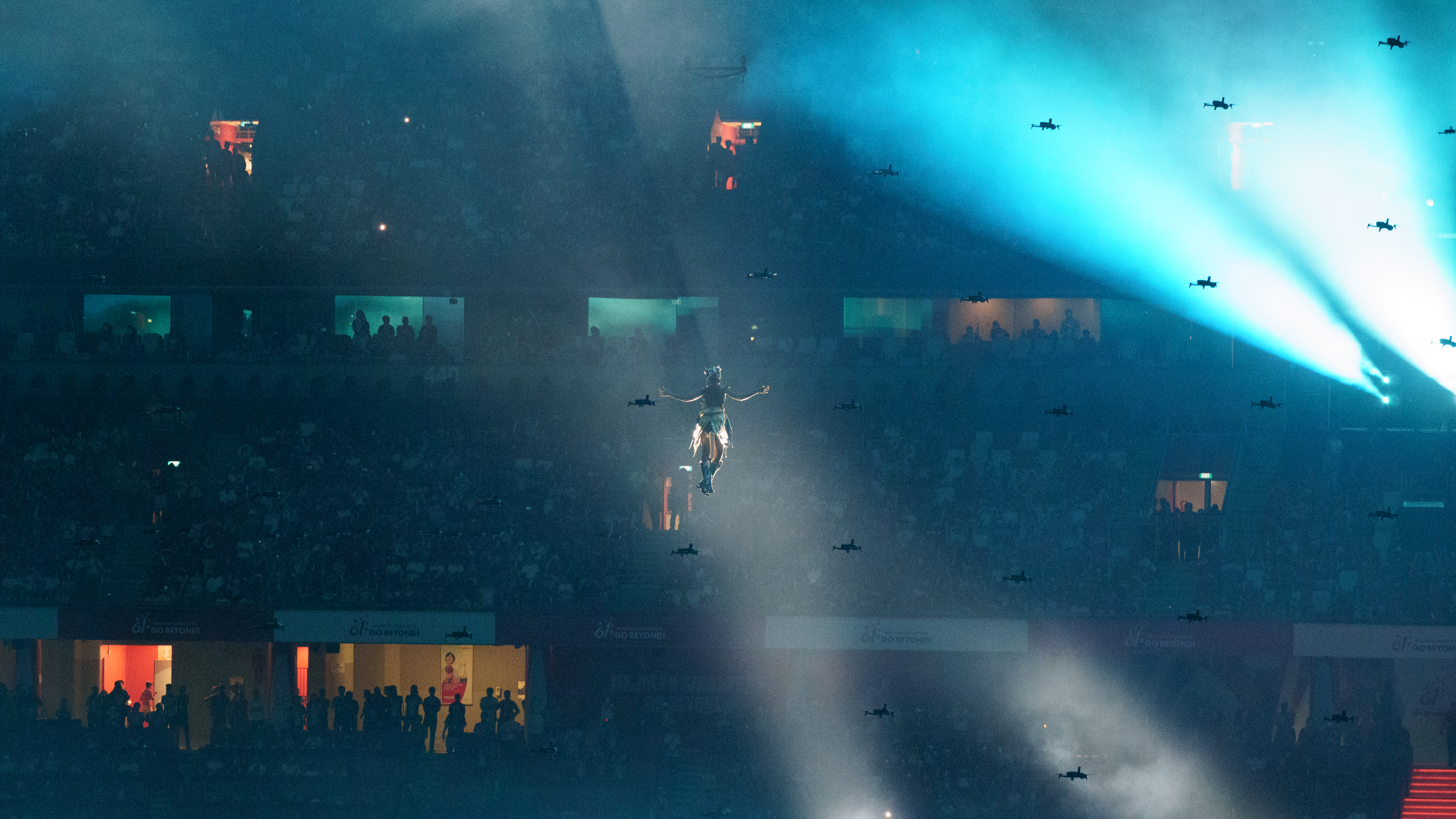
Jasmine Sokko (center) in mid-air, surrounded by drones

Various types of high-tech multimedia equipment are used during the actual show segment since 2003. Various technologies notable include the Projecteur d’Images Géantes Informatisées in 2003, a water-curtain visualization in 2007, and LED Mash in 2008. In 2026, 300 drones were flown in formation in the National Stadium while Jasmine Sokko performed her song, "You'll Be Okay" 30 meters high, in mid-air with two other aerialists.

=== Post-parade ===
Post-parade parties was first televised in 1997 and featured celebrities and performers to celebrate the success of the parade while providing entertainment to the audience awaiting to leave the venue. The afterparty celebrations usually last for an hour and ends with the Chief of Defence Force, the Chairman of that year's NDP EXCO and the organisers to cutting a cake to commemorate the efforts with the participants as well as speeches of gratitude to the audience for another great performance. The party is now normally anchored by the SAF Music and Drama Company.

== Logos ==
Since 1998, a unique logo design was selected to represent NDP on all fronts (including social media). Even though there had been logos for some previous years' parades, the logos were used exclusively for years of special commemoration, such as silver jubilee of Nation Building (1984) and Independence (1990). Slogans have also been used, such as "Our Singapore, Our Future", first used in the 1997 celebrations.

With the introduction of NDP logos for 1998, every logo henceforth would be designed to suit the themes, in particular the foundation theme of the parade for the year. A tagline, which was previously known as a slogan, was usually added to the logo design. An example was in 2005, where the tagline for NDP 2005 was "The Future is Ours to Make", was placed on the theme "40 Years of Nation Building". These taglines are usually taken from previous National Day Rallies for the purpose of rallying the nation together on 9 August to meet the challenges ahead. The tagline "Together We Make The Difference" was introduced in 1999 due to the launch of the Singapore 21 project, and was replaced by "Together, A New Singapore" in 2002 when then-Prime Minister Goh Chok Tong proposed the "Remaking Singapore" initiative in the National Day Rally 2001.

While most of the logos use a majority of red colour, in 2007, blue took over the traditional red to symbolise the water around the Marina Bay area. Regardless, the logos are important to note that the themes and taglines are largely different; and it is the theme that the parade or Show segment, on in some cases (2009 and 2015), both will be based on.

The designers behind each year’s National Day Parade (NDP) logo have been noted in various official galleries and creative showcases. These logos are typically developed by individual designers or design agencies, often based on the year’s theme and tagline. While some years have clear attribution, others remain uncredited or unknown. The following is a chronological list of known NDP logo designers:

2016: Chelsea Lim Xin and That Design Agency

2017: THINC

2018: THINC

2019: Marcus Oh and Kelvin Yap S. Han

2020: Designer unknown

2021: Tan Yu Xin and BLACK

2022: Designer unknown

2023: Designer unknown

2024: Designer unknown

2025: DSTNCT

2026: DSTNCT

== Songs ==
=== National Day songs ===
Under the Sing Singapore Festival, which inaugurated in 1984, numerous community songs have been composed. Nonetheless, only few National Day songs which struck a chord among Singaporeans continue to be sung annually in the parade. They are collectively known as the Sing Singapore Medley which comes after the fireworks display during the Grand Finale segment, or since 2008, forming the final part of the display.

Other National Day songs continue to be featured during the parade, either in the Pre-Parade segment, Parade and Ceremony segment or used as tunes to accompany the mass displays during the show part of the celebrations. In particular, for the Parade and Ceremony segment, in between the arrivals of Members of Parliament, Cabinet Ministers, the Prime Minister and the President, four songs each of one official language (English, Malay, Mandarin and Tamil) will be performed. In previous years, the final song in English (before the President's arrival) has always been the NDP theme song (in 2007 this was not the case) while in NDP 2008, all the songs performed in the P&C segment (in between arrivals) were all previous NDP theme songs in recent years. (The song tradition would return in 2017, but only in the pre-parade portion and in a different language order, while past theme songs were played during the arrivals.) The music performed during the parades have evolved over the decades, reflecting not just the change of musical influences and styles, but also the country's multi-ethnic character.

The 2010 P&C songs were three in number, due to the fact that the arrival of the Parliament deputies happened before the parade, and were unique because all the songs sung were in English (one song even had lyrics in the three other major languages).

In 2011, there was the "Fun Pack Song" which went along to the tune of Lady Gaga's 'Bad Romance'. The song was shortly scrapped.

The 2013's medley saw a record number of NDP songs that featured in this medley, with ten and lasted about five-and-a-half minutes: "Stand Up For Singapore", "We Will Get There", "What Do You See", "One United People", "Turn Up The Love" (not including NDP songs), "Home", "One People, One Nation, One Singapore", "Count On Me Singapore", "We Are Singapore" and "One Singapore" (that year's theme song).

In 2014, it was announced that there would be no new songs produced for National Day for the 2nd time in its long history, and in a historic move by the organizing committee, the classic NDP songs will be sung again. That year's edition saw past NDP theme songs being played during the arrival segments, and broke tradition by having the Sing Singapore Medley sung as the epilogue after the national anthem was played. The Sing Singapore Medley finale was repeated again in the 2015 event, after the Pledge Moment ends. Both cases have now included the 1998 theme song "Home" as part of the medley, just as it was the case in 2013.

2016 will see the medley also accompanied by special needs students provided by the seven Voluntary Welfare Organisations of the island country hand-signing for the deaf and hard of hearing who will take part, yet another first. The 1998 theme "Home" was sung as well. (Since 1989, a deaf Representative has been present to sign the Pledge for deaf viewers of the event.)

The 2023 medley included in a departure from the past the theme songs from 2021 and 2022.

=== Theme songs ===
NDP Theme songs were first introduced in 1984, starting with "Stand Up for Singapore", and again in the 1985 Parade; "Count on Me Singapore" which was performed at the 1986 Parade. Other notable songs include "We are Singapore" (1987–1988) and "One People, One Nation, One Singapore" (1990).

Theme songs were not prominent in the parades of the 1990s until 1998 when "Home", a song composed by Dick Lee and sung by Kit Chan. That year's parade feature "Home" and one more NDP song, "City For The World", sung by the children choir. Its popularity led to the production of the various renditions in 2004, including a rock piece composed by JJ Lin. This is partly to use the platform of the televised national event to increase awareness to new National Day pieces composed for the Sing Singapore Festival held then.

In 2003, however, a significant split took place when the National Day theme song of that year was not part of Sing Singapore theme song. Stefanie Sun's "One United People" was used as the theme song to better suit the theme of "A Cohesive Society" while Sean Wang's "A Place In My Heart" was chosen to lead the Sing Singapore 2003 Festival.

Before 2007, the theme songs come in two languages, the lingua franca in Singapore – English as well as Mandarin. To promote the songs, music videos that showcase local landmarks and lifestyle are made and shown on the Mediacorp TV network (save for CNA) a month before National Day and on the official NDPeeps YouTube channel and Facebook page; the songs will also be played on local radio stations. Legal MP3 downloads are also available on the NDP website from 2010 onwards.

Local songbirds that made it big in regional music scenes, such as Kaira Gong, Kit Chan, Corrine May, Stefanie Sun and Tanya Chua have been invited back home to perform various National Day theme songs. The winner of Singapore Idol 2004, Taufik Batisah, became a prominent choice to lead the nation in singing the NDP 2005's theme song "Reach Out for the Skies", alongside singer-actress Rui En.

In 2007, there were two theme songs instead of the usual one. 2009 was the last time a Chinese rendition of the English song was featured.

In 2013, the National Day Parade theme song will not be sung by renowned local artists but, for the first time, by fellow Singaporeans that join the "Sing A Nation" reality-competition organized by MediaCorp for that year's event.

It would be in 2014 when the NDP will not have another official theme song in a break from tradition for the second time, due to criticism of the past two NDP theme songs. In place of the theme song was three songs were remade into two music videos: "We Will Get There" and "One People, One Nation, One Singapore" sung by Ann Hussein, Rahimah Rahim, Gayle Nerva, Farisha Ishak, Tay Kewei and Tabitha Nauser; and "What Do You See" sung by Fauzie Laily, Jack Ho, Kartik Kunasegaran, Sivadorai "Rai" Sellakannu and Shaun Jansen. Dick Lee's 1996 song, "Big Island", debuted during the show segment of the parade.

The theme song tradition would return in the 2015 installment with a new song, "Our Singapore". In 2018, the theme song for that year featured a remake of 1987's "We Are Singapore" rather than an original song, followed by 2019's remake of "Our Singapore".

In 2020, a new theme song was composed for the first time in three years, featuring "Everything I Am" sung by Nathan Hartono. In a break for 2026, the NDP organizers instead officially commissioned the first ever all-NDP official concept album, with three theme songs specially composed for the event instead of the usual one.

The list of NDP theme songs are as follows:

Table Key

- Chinese version Remake of original music Recognised as a patriotic song

| Year | Song | Artistes |
|---|---|---|
| 1984^{1} | Stand Up for Singapore | |
| 1986 | Count on Me Singapore | Clement Chow |
| 1987 | We are Singapore | Jonathan Tan, Roslinda Baharudin, Anne Weerapass and Robert Fernando |
| 1990 | One People, One Nation, One Singapore | Clement Chow, Faridah Ali, Jacintha Abisheganaden, Stephen Francis |
| 1991 | It's the Little Things | Mel Ferdinands, Mahani Mohd |
| 1996 | Count On Me Singapore | Clement Chow |
| 1998 | Home | Kit Chan |
| 1998 | 家 (Jiā) | Kit Chan |
| 1998 | City for the World | |
| 1999 | Together | Evelyn Tan & Dreamz FM |
| 1999 | 心连心 (Xīn lián xīn) | Evelyn Tan & Dreamz FM |
| 2000 | Shine on Me | Jai Wahab |
| 2000 | 星月 (Xīng yuè) | Mavis Hee |
| 2001 | Where I Belong | Tanya Chua |
| 2001 | 属于 (Shǔ yú) | Tanya Chua |
| 2002 | We Will Get There | Stefanie Sun |
| 2002 | 一起走到 (Yīqǐ zǒu dào) | Stefanie Sun |
| 2003 | One United People | Stefanie Sun |
| 2003 | 全心全意 (Quán xīn quán yì) | Stefanie Sun |
| 2004 | Home | Kit Chan and JJ Lin^{2} |
| 2004 | 家 (Jiā) | Kit Chan and JJ Lin^{2} |
| 2005 | Reach Out for the Skies | Taufik Batisah and Rui En |
| 2005 | 勇敢向前飞 (Yǒnggǎn xiàng qián fēi) | Rui En |
| 2006 | My Island Home | Kaira Gong |
| 2006 | 幸福的图形 (Xìngfú de túxíng) | Kaira Gong |
| 2007 | There's No Place I'd Rather Be | Kit Chan |
| 2007 | Will You | Janani Sridhar, Asha Edmund, Emma Yong, Lily Anna Rahmat, Jai Wahab, Shabir Mohammed, Sebastian Tan, Gani Karim |
| 2008 | Shine for Singapore | Hady Mirza |
| 2008 | 晴空万里 (Qíng kōng wàn lǐ) | Joi Chua |
| 2009 | What Do You See? | Electrico |
| 2009 | 就在这里 (Jiù zài zhèlǐ) | Kelvin Tan |
| 2010 | Song for Singapore | Corrinne May |
| 2011 | In a Heartbeat | Sylvia Ratonel |
| 2012 | Love At First Light | Olivia Ong and Natanya Tan |
| 2013 | One Singapore | 68-member choir "Sing A Nation" |
| 2015 | Our Singapore | JJ Lin and Dick Lee |
| 2016 | Tomorrow's Here Today | 53A |
| 2017 | Because it's Singapore | Jay Lim |
| 2018 | We Are Singapore | Charlie Lim, Vanessa Fernandez, Aisyah Aziz, Shak'thiya Subramaniam, Kevin Lester (The Lion City Boy), Joanna Dong and ITE Show Choir |
| 2019 | Our Singapore | Rahimah Rahim, Jacintha Abisheganaden, Stefanie Sun, JJ Lin, Dick Lee and Kit Chan |
| 2020 | Everything I Am | Nathan Hartono |
| 2021 | The Road Ahead | Linying, Sezairi Sezali, Shye-Anne Brown, and Shabir Tabare Alam |
| 2022 | Stronger Together | Taufik Batisah, The Island Voices |
| 2023 | Shine Your Light | 53A, The Island Voices, lewloh, Olivia Ong, ShiGGa Shay, Iman Fandi, Lineath |
| 2024 | Not Alone | Benjamin Kheng, Music and Drama Company |
| 2025 | Here We Are | Charlie Lim, Kit Chan, The Island Voices |
| 2026 | Giants | Iman Fandi |
| 2026 | Sparkle | Gareth Fernandez, Dru Chen |
| 2026 | You'll Be Okay | Jasmine Sokko |

1. Also used in the 1985 parade.
2. The MTV versions were choral renditions performed by Young Voices, which comprises the choirs from the Tanjong Katong Girls' School and Tampines Primary School.

=== National Songs' Role In Nation Building ===
National songs are taught in schools and are also broadcast on national television. The communal singing of songs was used by the government of the time to unite the country. A National Folks Song Committee was launched in 1980 to achieve this aim. National Day theme songs are a subset of national songs.

National Day theme songs have been used by the government to define what it means to be Singaporean. The Singaporean work ethic is described as the key factor for the country's success with calls for Singaporeans to emulate the hard work of past generations in "Stand Up For Singapore" (1984) and "Count On Me Singapore" (1986). The unity of Singaporeans, in spite of their race and religion, is also highlighted by imagery that seeks to bring the country together, such as through the collective 'lion's roar' in the lyrics of "We Are Singapore" (1987).

National Day theme songs reflect Singapore's progress over time and retell the story of Singapore's rapid economic progress from "third-world" to "first-world". Songs from 1959 to 1983 reflect an attempt by the government to define a national identity. Between 1984 and 1996, the government sought to fully define and propagate the country's national identity. "We Are Singapore" (1987) included the lyrics "There was a time when people said that Singapore won't make it, but we did. There was a time when troubles seemed to much to take, but we did. We built a nation strong and free..." to increase pride in Singaporeans and reinforce the story of Singapore's economic progress. Songs from the 1990s to the 2010s reflect the increased educational status and cultural capital of Singaporeans by relying on lyrics that are less overtly patriotic. "Love At First Light" (2012) had no mention of the word "Singapore" in its lyrics.

National Day theme songs seek to define Singapore's future and serve as a call to action. "Home" (1998) reinforced the image of Singapore's place in an increasingly globalized world. It sought to reach out to Singaporeans living overseas to return home because Singapore is 'where my dreams wait for me, where the river always flows". The 1999 theme song "Together", was named as a reference to the title of the country's Vision Statement of that period. The music video of "Stand Up For Singapore" (2000) paints the picture of a progressive Singapore as the four lead singers — all under the age of thirty — danced in Mass Rapid Transit stations and the rooftop of a skyscraper. The 2009 theme song "What Do You See?" was the first song performed by an indie rock band.

A survey conducted by the Lee Kuan Yew Centre For Innovative Cities in 2021 found songs released prior to 2000 to be more popular with Singaporeans. These songs focused on the themes of dreams, home and nation building.

== NDP funpacks ==
Funpacks were introduced in 1991, which contain various goodies each year. These goodies include food, drinks, vouchers from various participating companies and sponsors, as well as items and commodities intended for the use during the parade, such as a theme-designed torchlight and the Singapore flag. For most years, the funpacks are packed by selected members of the Singapore Armed Forces. In 2009, prisoners helped to pack the funpacks through the Yellow Ribbon Project.

Most funpacks are designed by students from local polytechnics and community services. For the 2015 funpack, people from all walks of life created 50 different designs for the funpack. The funpack included a Singa Lion figurine, snacks and games. It was distributed to every Singaporean and permanent resident household.

In 2019, the funpacks were redesigned to be more environmentally-friendly. The 2024 funpacks were designed by students from special education schools, with themed designs based on the pillars of Total Defence. The funpacks were constructed by national servicemen; that year, the NDP began experimenting with powered exoskeletons and mobile robots to assist in production.

In 2025, the NDP packs came in seven designs, featuring works of art by 41 artists with disabilities. Multiculturalism, Resilience, Openness and Boldness were the themes of four of the NDP pack designs, created by 21 artists at ART:DIS.

== See also ==
- Singapore National Day Rally
