= Linying (singer-songwriter) =

Singaporean singer-songwriter

- Born: 1 October 1994 (age 32); Singapore
- Occupation: Singer-songwriter
- Instruments: Vocals, piano
- Labels: Universal Music Singapore; (2016–present); Nettwerk Music Group; (2016–present)

Linying (born 1 October 1994) is a Singaporean singer-songwriter. She recently signed on a multi-rights deal with Universal Music Singapore, becoming the first Singapore female artist to do so, and Canadian music label Nettwerk Music Group. She has collaborated with Felix Jaehn and KRONO, and has received special praise from Troye Sivan for her vocals. Linying also collaborated with Sezairi, Shye and Shabir on the National Day Parade 2021 Theme Song, "The Road Ahead", selected for the song's significance in the adversities caused by the ongoing COVID-19 pandemic on Singapore.

== Discography ==
=== Singles ===
- "Sticky Leaves" (2016)
- "Alpine" (2016)
- "Paris 12" (2016)
- "Tall Order" (2018)
- "Paycheck" (2018)
- "All of Our Friends Know" (2019)
- "Good Behaviour" (2021)
- "Dial Tone" (2025)

=== Extended plays ===
- Paris 12 (2016)
