= Singapore Armed Forces Parachute Team =

Parachute display team

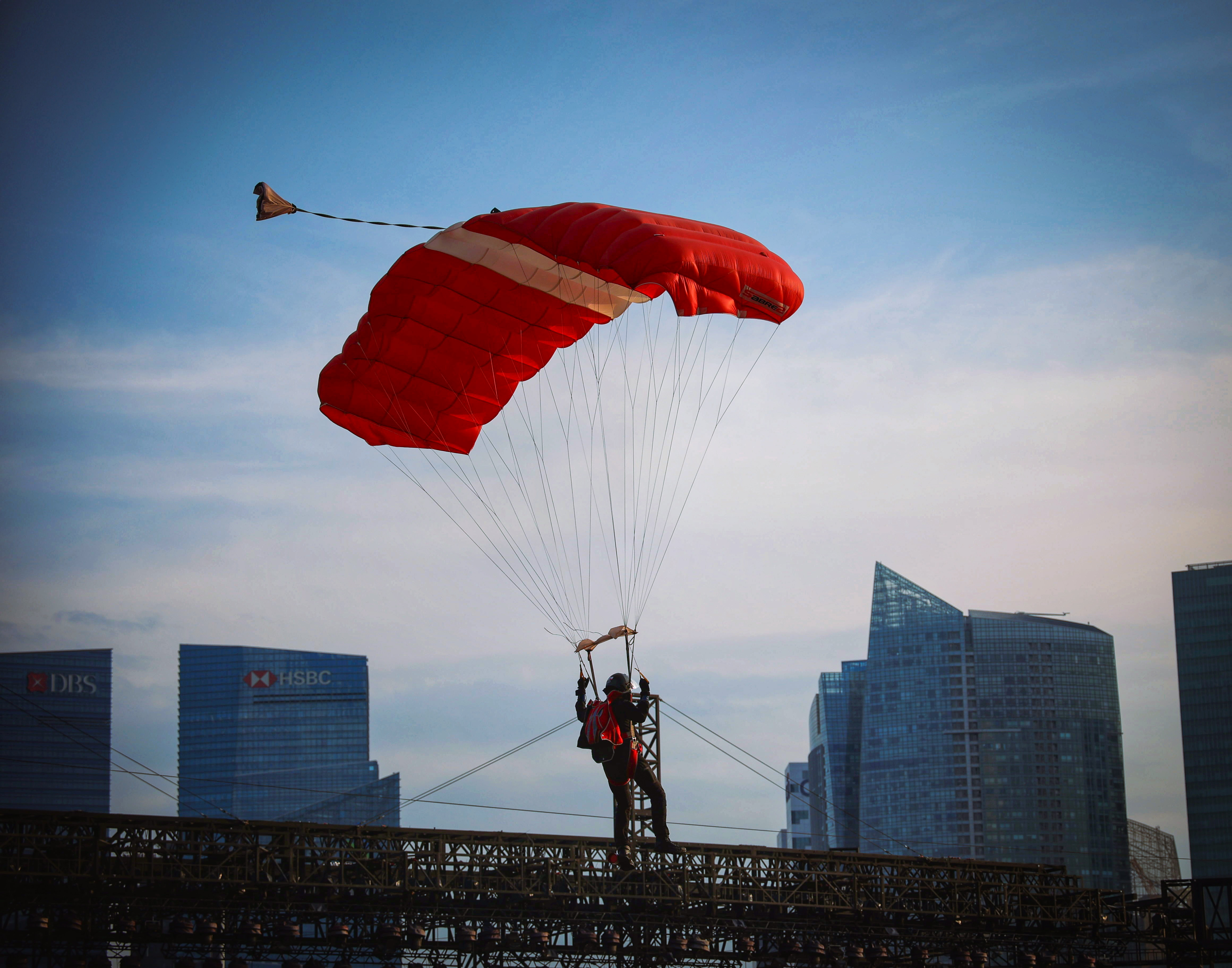
Red Lion parachutist landing on a pier at the Marina Bay, Singapore.

The Singapore Armed Forces Parachute Team (SAFPT), also known as the Red Lions, is best known for its free-fall displays at the annual National Day Parade held in Singapore since its first appearance in 1989 as a formalised team, although members of the Singapore Commandos Formation had put on sporadic displays since the 1970s. Primarily responsible for organising display jumps and representing the Singapore Armed Forces in competitions, the team adopted the name "Red Lions" in 1996 as part of its identity.

In 2014, Third Warrant Officer Shirley Ng became the first female Red Lion parachutist to jump at the National Day Parade in Singapore.

The Red Lions also saw action in the opening ceremony of the 1993 Southeast Asian Games.

== Organisation ==
The SAFPT comprises two entities: the display jumpers themselves, and the "central nucleus". The basic qualification for a display jumper is a minimum of 500 jumps, with its members drawn only from amongst the Commandos and the Naval Diving Unit as they are the only formations which are operationally trained in military free-fall. Training is usually conducted on weekends to avoid affecting operational responsibilities during the workweek, as all free-fallers are also full-time servicemen.

The central nucleus supports the display team's logistical and administrative needs, and plan and coordinate their training program. As such, most of them are Parachute Jump Instructors from the Parachute Training Wing.

== Competitions ==
As representing the SAF is one of the team's two main responsibilities, the SAFPT has participated and won awards in various competitions such as the Malaysia Prime Minister Challenge Trophy for Accuracy and the Australian Defence Force Parachuting Championship for Accuracy.

The SAF's Red Lions Parachuting Team from the Commando Formation defeated 16 teams from 11 countries to set the new Asiana Four-way FS record and clinch the top award in the 12th Asiania Four-Way Formation Skydiving Championship, held from 29 October to 7 November at Fujairah, United Arab Emirates. The team, from the Commando Formation, also achieved the 1st Runner's Up position behind a team from Russia in the 1st Fujairah International Open Category Four-Way Formation Skydiving Championships in 2008.

== Safety and incidents ==
Attention paid towards training safety has resulted in few incidents affecting team members, although a bad fall during a full-dress rehearsal for the 2005 National Day Parade by Master Sergeant Chua Koon San raised concerns and speculation that the free-fall performances may be cancelled. The Ministry of Defence however issued a reassurance that the show would carry on.

On July 15, 2021, a Red Lion suffered a hard fall and was stretchered off after a test jump in Bishan in preparation for National Day in Heartlands. A flag attached to the Red Lion got caught in grass prior to his landing. During the Red Lions' performance for NDP 2022, the last of the 10 parachutists 3WO Jeffrey Heng suffered a rough landing and was stretchered off. He was subsequently reported to be in stable condition.
