= 53A =

53A may refer to:

- 53A (band), a Singaporean band
- 53A (CTA bus), a bus service serving Pulaski Road in Chicago
