= Count On Me, Singapore =

Singaporean patriotic song

"Count on Me, Singapore" is a Singaporean National Day song composed by Canadian musician Hugh Harrison and arranged by Jeremy Monteiro. It was composed for the 1986 National Day Parade and was first performed by Clement Chow. The song's production was sponsored by the beverages company Fraser and Neave.

In 2020, during the COVID-19 pandemic, Chow and a number of Singaporean singers sang a modified version of the song titled Stay at Home, Singapore to encourage Singaporeans to stay at home during the nationwide lockdown.

== Plagiarism allegations ==
In early March 2021, netizens uncovered multiple music-video versions of a song, "We Can Achieve", whose lyrics and melody are similar to that of "Count on Me, Singapore". One of the publishers of the music videos, Pauline India, stated that it had purchased the copyright for the lyrics and music in 1999 from Indian songwriter Joey Mendoza, who claimed to own the copyright; Mendoza was accused of plagiarism as a result. In response to the accusations, Mendoza stated that he composed "Achieve" in 1983, three years before "Count on Me, Singapore" was composed. After composition, he claimed to have performed to the song in an orphanage in Mumbai. He also claimed that the original masters of the song were destroyed in the 2005 Mumbai floods. The Singapore Ministry of Culture, Community, and Youth, which owns the copyright to "Count on Me, Singapore", challenged the claim, saying that We Can Achieve "appears to have been substantially copied from 'Count on Me, Singapore'" and requested that Mendoza provide proof. Harrison and Monteiro, who composed "Count on Me, Singapore", also disputed the claims, with Harrison threatening to sue Mendoza for libel. Mendoza retracted his claims on 18 March 2021.
