= Shye =

Singaporean singer-songwriter (born 2002)

- Born: Trinity Shye-Anne Brown (布朗诗蒽); August 2, 2002 (age 24); Singapore, Singapore
- Genres: Dream pop, alternative rock, shoegaze, bedroom pop
- Occupations: Singer-songwriter, musician
- Instrument: Vocals
- Years active: 2018–present

Trinity Shye-Anne Brown (Chinese: 布朗诗蒽; born 2 August 2002) known professionally as Shye, is a Singaporean singer-songwriter.

== Biography ==
Shye was born and raised in Singapore to a Chinese-Singaporean mother and British father. In 2018, at the age of 16, Shye won the Vans Musicians Wanted 2018 showcase with six of her original songs. In 2020, Shye released her debut album, Days to Morning Glory. This album won her the Best New Artist award at the Freshmusic Awards.

In 2021, Shye participated in Singapore's annual National Day parade as one of the singers of its theme song, The Road Ahead. She was nominated for Best Asian Creative Artist award at 12th Golden Indie Music Awards. In 2022, Shye won the Best New Act from Asia title at the NME Awards 2022. In 2023, Shye performed at the South by Southwest music festival. Shye would also participate in the Chinese televised music competition show, Youth π Plan and entered its grand finals.

== Discography ==
=== Album ===
- Days to Morning Glory (2020)
- The Doves Came Home (2026)

=== Extended plays ===
- Augus7ine (2018)
- hello TRINITY (2021)
- idk it's complicated (2022)
- 9LIVES (2023)

=== Singles ===
- phonecase (2022)
- Safe (2023)
- Flower (2023)
- Joke (2023)
- Somehow (2023)
- can't you see (2024)
- WONDERFUL DAY (2024)
- without you (2024)
- coffee or tea (2024)
- The Sun Will Cry (2024)
- Cecilia (2025)
- Waited for you (2025)
- All at once (2025)
- Shed (2025)
- 3am (2025)
- Too late (2025)
- Signs (2025)
- I always knew (2026)
- Smoke (2026)
- Someone, Always (2026)

=== Collaborations ===
- The Road Ahead (2021) – 2021 National Day Parade theme song

== Filmography ==
=== Television ===
Ten's television credits
Year	Title	Role	Note	Ref.
2012	Okto Star	First Runner-Up	Okto	
2023	Youth π Plan: 青年π计划	Finalist	Hunan TV	青年π计划
2024	Chuang Asia: Thailand	Contestant	WeTV	
