= List of Singaporean patriotic songs =

This article contains a list of Singaporean patriotic songs. The list has both traditional folk songs that have special meaning to Singaporeans, as well as modern songs composed specifically for national celebrations, particularly the National Day Parade held on 9 August each year since 1965 on Singapore's National Day.

Generally speaking, there may be said to be two types of Singaporean patriotic songs. The first type is traditional folk songs that have, over time, come to have special meaning to Singaporeans. Many of these are in mother tongue languages – Mandarin, Malay and Tamil, for instance. Examples of such songs include the Mandarin song "Xiao Ren Wu De Xin Sheng" "(小人物的心声)", Malay song "Di Tanjung Katong" and Tamil song "Munnaeru Vaalibaa".

The second type is the comparatively modern songs, mostly in English, that were composed specifically for national events – particularly the National Day Parade held annually on 9 August – and for use in schools. Each year since 1985, the National Day Parade Executive Committee has designated one such song as a National Day Parade theme song. The song is usually broadcast on radio and television starting from a month before National Day, and is given prominence during the Parade itself. Examples of such songs include "Stand Up for Singapore" (1985), "Count On Me Singapore" (1986) and "One People, One Nation, One Singapore" (1990). In 1998, there were two National Day Parade theme songs, "Home" and "City For The World". The former was reused for the 2004 ceremony. In 2007, they used two National Day Parade theme songs, "There's No Place I'd Rather Be" and "Will You?".

As for the National Day Ceremony song, "My People My Home", it was conducted by Dr Lee Tzu Pheng, it came out in the late 1990s and was reused for National Day Parade 2012, together with "Love at First Light" which is sung by singer Olivia Ong. In 1984, the National Arts Council inaugurated the Sing Singapore Festival, with the aim of discovering and promoting home-grown music and artistes. According to the Council, it also hoped to nurture a love for music and singing and cultivate a greater sense of togetherness amongst Singaporeans. The programme led to the creation of a number of new songs by Singaporean composers, some of which were selected for National Day celebrations. These included "Home" (1998) by Dick Lee, "Where I Belong" (2001) by Tanya Chua, and "A Place in My Heart" (2003) by Kevin Quah. Local singers such as Taufik Batisah, Kit Chan and Stefanie Sun have performed songs in the Sing Singapore collection.

== The National Anthem ==
| Title | Date | Author(s) | Copyright owner(s) |
|---|---|---|---|
| Majulah Singapura (Onward Singapore) | 1958 | Lyrics and music: Zubir Said | Ministry of Information, Communications and the Arts |

== National Day theme songs ==
| Year | Song | Singers | Composer | Lyricist | Music director | Music Video Director | Chinese Version | Singers |
|---|---|---|---|---|---|---|---|---|
| 1984 | "Stand Up for Singapore" | | Hugh Harrison | | | | | |
| 1985 | "Stand Up for Singapore" | | Hugh Harrison | | | | | |
| 1986 | "Count On Me, Singapore" | Clement Chow | Hugh Harrison | | | | | |
| 1987 | "We Are Singapore" | Jonathan Tan, Roslinda Baharudin, Anne Weerapass and Robert Fernando | Hugh Harrison | | | | | |
| 1988 | "We Are Singapore" | Jonathan Tan, Roslinda Baharudin, Anne Weerapass and Robert Fernando | Hugh Harrison | | | | | |
| 1989 | "Five Stars Arising" | Lim Su Chong" | | | | | | |
| 1990 | "One People, One Nation, One Singapore" | Faridah Ali, Jacintha Abisheganaden, Stephen Francis and Clement Chow | Jeremy Monteiro | Jim Aitchison | | | | |
| 1991 | "It's the Little Things" | | Patrick Seet | Ivan Chua | | | | |
| 1995 | "My People My Home" | Dr Lee Tzu Pheng | | | | | | |
| 1996 | "Count On Me Singapore" | Clement Chow | | | | | | |
| 1997 | "Singapore Town" | The Sidaislers | | | | | | |
| 1998 | "Home" | Kit Chan | Dick Lee | | | | 家 | Kit Chan 陈洁仪 |
| 1998 | "City for the World" | Kit Chan | | | | | | Kit Chan 陈洁仪 |
| 1999 | "Together" | Evelyn Tan & Dreamz FM | Ken Lim | | | | 心连心 | Evelyn Tan & Dreamz FM 陈毓云、梦飞船 |
| 2000 | "Shine on Me" | Jai Wahab | Jim Lim | | | | 星月 | Mavis Hee 许美静 |
| 2001 | "Where I Belong" | Tanya Chua | Tanya Chua | | | | 属于 | Tanya Chua 蔡健雅 |
| 2002 | "We Will Get There" | Stefanie Sun | Dick Lee | | | | 一起走到 | Stefanie Sun 孙燕姿 |
| 2003 | "One United People" | Stefanie Sun | Joshua Wan | | | | 全心全意 | Stefanie Sun 孙燕姿 |
| 2004 | "Home" | Kit Chan and JJ Lin; The MTV versions were choral renditions performed by Young Voices, which comprises the Choirs from the Tanjong Katong Girls' School and Tampines Primary School. | Dick Lee | | | | 家 | Kit Chan and JJ Lin 陈洁仪、林俊杰 |
| 2005 | "Reach Out for the Skies" | Taufik Batisah and Rui En | Elaine Chan | Selena Tan | | | 勇敢向前飞 | Rui En 瑞恩 |
| 2006 | "My Island Home" | Kaira Gong | Joshua Wan | | | | 幸福的图形 | Kaira Gong 龚诗嘉 |
| 2007 | "There's No Place I'd Rather Be" | Kit Chan | Jimmy Ye | | | | | |
| 2007 | "Will You" | Janani Sridhar, Asha Edmund, Emma Yong, Lily Ann Rahmat, Jai Wahab, Shabir Mohammed, Sebastian Tan, Gani Karim | Jimmy Ye | | | | | |
| 2008 | "Shine for Singapore" | Hady Mirza | Benny Wong | | | | 晴空万里 | Joi Chua 蔡淳佳 |
| 2009 | "What Do You See?" | Electrico | Electrico | | | | 就在这里 | Kelvin Tan 陈伟联 |
| 2010 | "Song for Singapore" | Corrinne May | Corrine May | | | | | |
| 2011 | "In a Heartbeat" | Sylvia Ratonel | Goh Keng Long | Haresh Sharma | | Brian Gothong Tan | | |
| 2012 | "Love At First Light" | Olivia Ong and Natanya Tan | Iskandar Ismail | Paul Tan | | | | |
| 2013 | "One Singapore" | 68-member choir "Sing A Nation" | Elaine Chan | Selena Tan | | | | |
| 2014 | "We Will Get There" | Farisha Ishak, Fauzi Laili, Tay Ke Wei and Rahimah Rahim | | | | | | |
| 2015 | "Our Singapore" | Dick Lee & JJ Lin | Dick Lee | | | | | |
| 2016 | "Tomorrow's Here Today" | 53A | Don Richmond | | | | | |
| 2017 | "Because it's Singapore" | Jay Lim | Lee Wei Song | Jay Lim | Miso Tan | | | |
| 2018 | "We Are Singapore" (Remake) | Charlie Lim, Vanessa Fernandez, Aisyah Aziz, Shak'thiya Subramaniamm, Joanna Dong and THELIONCITYBOY | Charlie Lim (Preface); Hugh Harrison (Original chorus) | | Dr Sydney Tan, Charlie Lim, Evan Low | Li Lin Wee | | |
| 2019 | "Our Singapore" (Remake) | Rahimah Rahim, Jacintha Abisheganaden, Stefanie Sun, JJ Lin, Dick Lee, Kit Chan | Dick Lee | | Dr Sydney Tan | Royston Tan | | |
| 2020 | "Everything I Am" | Nathan Hartono | Joshua Wan | | Dr Sydney Tan | | | |
| 2021 | "The Road Ahead" | Linying, Sezairi Sezali, Shabir, Shye-Anne Brown | Linying, Evan Low | | Dr Sydney Tan | Huang Junxiang, Jerrold Chong | | |
| 2022 | "Stronger Together" | Taufik Batisah ft. The Island Voices | Don Richmond | | | Lindsay Jialin | | |
| 2023 | "Shine Your Light" | 53A, The Island Voices, lewloh, Olivia Ong, ShiGGa Shay, Iman Fandi, Lineath | Don Richmond | Don Richmond, ShiGGa Shay | | Jin Pek | | |
| 2024 | "Not Alone" | Benjamin Kheng, Music & Drama Company | Benjamin Kheng | Benjamin Kheng, Evan Low | | Koo Chia Meng, Brian Gothong Tan, Davier Yoon | | |
| 2025 | "Here We Are" | | Charlie Lim, Chok Kerong | Charlie Lim | Dr Sydney Tan | He Shuming | | |
| 2026 | "You'll Be Okay" | Jasmine Sokko | Jasmine Sokko, Josh Wei | Jasmine Sokko | Bang Wenfu | Jasmine Sokko, Josh Wei, JJ Lin | | |
| 2026 | "Giants" | Iman Fandi | weish | | | | | |
| 2026 | "Sparkle" | Gareth Fernandez, Dru Chen | Gareth Fernandez, Dru Chen | Gareth Fernandez, Dru Chen | | | | |

== Songs in English ==
| Title | Date | Author(s) | Copyright owner(s) | Notes |
|---|---|---|---|---|
| "Count On Me, Singapore" | 1986 | Lyrics and music: Hugh Harrison | Ministry of Information, Communications and the Arts and the National Arts Council | Commissioned by the Cultural Affairs Division, Ministry of Community Development |
| "Five Stars Arising" | 1969 | Lyrics and music: Lim Su Chong | Ministry of Information, Communications and the Arts and the National Arts Council | |
| "It's the Little Things" | 1991 | Lyrics: Patrick Seet Music: Ivan Chua | Ministry of Information, Communications and the Arts and the National Arts Council | |
| "Moments of Magic" | 1999 | Lyrics and music: Ken Lim | Ministry of Information, Communications and the Arts and the National Arts Council | |
| "One People, One Nation, One Singapore" | 1990 | Lyrics: Jim Aitchison Music: Jeremy Monteiro | Ministry of Information, Communications and the Arts and the National Arts Council | Commissioned by the Ministry of Information and the Arts |
| "Singapore Town" | 1967 | Lyrics and music: The Sidaislers | | |
| "Singapura, Sunny Island" | 1962 | | MediaCorp Pte. Ltd. | Translated from Indonesian version |
| "Song for Singapore" | 2010 | Lyrics and music: Corrinne May | | |
| "Stand Up for Singapore" | 1984 | Lyrics and music: Hugh Harrison | Ministry of Information, Communications and the Arts and the National Arts Council | Commissioned by the Ministry of Culture |
| There's No Place I'd Rather Be | 2007 | Lyrics and music: Jimmy Ye | | |
| These Are The Days | 2015 | Lyrics and music: Lee Chin Sin | | |
| "We Are Singapore" | 1987 | Lyrics and music: Hugh Harrison; Orchestration: Jeremy Monteiro | Ministry of Information, Communications and the Arts and the National Arts Council | Commissioned by the Cultural Affairs Division, Ministry of Community Development |
| "What Do You See?" | 2009 | Lyrics and music: Electrico | | |
| "Will You" | 2007 | Lyrics and music: Jimmy Ye | | |
| "Not Alone" | 2024 | Lyrics and music: Benjamin Kheng | | |
| "Here We Are" | 2025 | | | |

Notes

- The song highlighted in blue was designated as the "millennium song" by the National Arts Council.
- The four songs highlighted in pink were designated as "national songs" by the National Arts Council.
- Songs highlighted in red are National Day Parade theme songs.
- Songs highlighted in yellow were designated as "community songs" by the National Arts Council.
- The song highlighted in green is the winner of SG50: The Gift of Song.

== Songs in Malay ==
| Title | Date | Author(s) | Copyright owner(s) |
|---|---|---|---|
| Chan Mali Chan | 2010 | from Nusa Tenggara - | Traditional, not copyrighted |
| Di Tanjung Katong | | Composer Osman Ahmad, musician in 1930s. Reference found in MUSIKA: Arena Muzik Silam di Malaya. NLB. | Copyright controlled. |
| Semoga Bahagia | | Lyrics and music: Zubir Said | |

Notes

- Songs highlighted in yellow were designated as "community songs" by the National Arts Council.
- Semoga Bahagia was designated as the official Children's Day song.

== Songs in Mandarin ==
| Title | Date | Author(s) | Copyright owner(s) |
|---|---|---|---|
| 小人物的心声 (Xiao Ren Wu De Xin Sheng) (Voices from the Heart) | 1986 | Lyrics: Bok Sek Yieng Music: Tan Kian Chin, Wen Xueying | Touch Music Publishing Pte. Ltd. |
| 相信我吧，新加坡! (Xiāngxìn wǒ ba, Xīnjiāpō!) (Believe in me, Singapore!) | 1980s | Lyrics and music: Raymond Liam, Koh Joo Ann | Not copyrighted |

== Songs in Tamil ==
| Title | Date | Author(s) | Copyright owner(s) |
|---|---|---|---|
| Munnaeru Vaalibaa | 1966 | S. Jesudassan | Not copyrighted |
| Engkal Singapore | 1966 | Lyrics: Peri Nela Palanivelan; Music: L Krishna Samy | Not copyrighted |
| Singai Naadu | 2012 | Composed & Performed by: Shabir Tabare Alam Lyrics: Shabir Tabare Alam | Copyright: Shabir Tabare Alam |

Notes

- Songs highlighted in yellow were designated as "community songs" by the National Arts Council.

== Songs in Kristang ==
| Title | Date | Author(s) | Copyright owner(s) |
|---|---|---|---|
| Jinkli Nona | Unknown | Unknown | Not copyrighted |

== Reception ==
A minor controversy also erupted over "There's No Place I'd Rather Be" (2007). Some people queried why the song does not mention Singapore by name, while others commented that the song was "touching" and that they related to it immediately, and that "[t]he spirit of patriotism is woven so well in the song". One correspondent to the Straits Times asked: "How did such a dreadful song become the National Day song?", lambasting the melody as "uninspiring" and the lyrics as "insipid" – "it is quite obvious what the brief to [the composer] was: Write a song to persuade Singaporeans who have sought greener pastures to come home." The song's composer Jimmy Ye defended it, saying, "There's no need for it to be so in-your-face just because it's a National Day song". He noted that he had submitted the first draft of the song to the National Day Parade song committee, which had returned it with several changes. There was no mention of why "Singapore" got left out: "I guess the committee wanted to have a soft-sell approach too".

== See also ==
- Music of Singapore – National Day songs
- National Day Parade – Theme songs
