= Kelvin Tan discography =

This is the discography of Singaporean singer Kelvin Tan

== Singles ==
童话 (Fable)

- Released: August 2005
- Format: CD
- Label: Play Music / Warner Music / Universal Music
- Producer: 吴佳明
- Sales: Singapore: 15,000^{[a]}

== Studio albums ==
我只是想要... (All I Want Is...) (Kelvin Tan's debut album)

- Released: 11 January 2006(Singapore); 26 January 2006(Malaysia)
- Format: CD
- Label: Play Music
- Sales: Singapore: 45,000(Triple Platinum); Malaysia: 15,000(Platinum)
- Certification: 触摸 (Touch) won Best Theme Song at 2006 Star Awards held by MediaCorp, Singapore.

我只是想要... (All I Want Is...) [CD+VCD] (Repackaged Edition)

- Released: 9 March 2006
- Format: CD+VCD
- Label: Play Music

i伟联 (i-Weilian) (Kelvin Tan's debut album in Taiwan)

- Released: 31 August 2007 (Taiwan), 18 September 2007 (Singapore)
- Format: CD
- Label: Warner Music
- Sales: Singapore: 15,000

i伟联 (i-Weilian) (Singapore Repackaged Edition)

- Released: November 2007 (Singapore)
- Format: CD
- Label: Warner Music

走唱陈伟联 (Moving Notes Kelvin Tan) (Kelvin Tan's 3rd album)

- Released: 9 August 2009(Singapore), 10 October 2009 (Malaysia), 31 December 2009 (Taiwan)
- Format: CD
- Label: Warner Music

走唱陈伟联 (Moving Notes Kelvin Tan) (Singapore Repackaged Edition)

- Released: 26 November 2009 (Singapore)
- Format: CD
- Label: Warner Music

== VCDs/DVDs ==
我只是想要...唱卡拉OK (All I Want Is... Singing Karaoke)

- Released: May 2006
- Format: VCD
- Label: Play Music

陈伟联首场个人演唱会 (Kelvin Tan Debut Concert)

- Released: January 2007
- Format: DVD
- Label: Warner Music

== Compilations ==
Best of 绝对 Superstar (Best of Project SuperStar) (Kelvin Tan sung 其实你不懂我的心 [You Don't Know My Heart])

- Released: September 2005
- Format: CD
- Label: Play Music

== Notes ==
a. Single's sales determine Kelvin's possibility of being Project SuperStar champion
