= Damai (disambiguation) =

Damai is a caste within the Khas people in Nepal and India.

Damai may also refer to:

- Miji people, group found in Arunachal Pradesh, India, also known as Damai
- Damai Entertainment Holdings, a Chinese film and ticketing company under the Alibaba Group.
  - Damai.cn, a Chinese ticketing website
- Damai Center, an indoor arena in China
- Damai Secondary School, a school in Singapore

== See also ==
- Damai LRT station (disambiguation)
- Jalan Damai, Singapore
