= Song for Singapore =

Single by Corrinne May

from the album Beautiful Seed Deluxe Edition
- Released: July 6, 2010
- Recorded: 2010
- Genre: Pop
- Length: 3:33
- Label: Eq music
- Songwriter: Corrinne May

Official National Day Parade theme song singles chronology
"What Do You See?" (2009)	"Song for Singapore" (2010)	"In a Heartbeat" (2011)

"Song for Singapore" is a song composed and sung by Singaporean (American-based) singer, Corrinne May. It was officially commissioned as the official theme for the 2010 National Day Parade. The single is the first NDP theme song to be available for free digital download. The song was performed twice during the National Day Parade, once as a dance version by Sezairi Sezali and Sylvia Ratonel as the Prime Minister of Singapore took his seat during the parade, and later in the performance sequence of the parade in its original tune, sung by Corrinne herself. This song was also performed during NDP 2015. The song is currently used when Members of Parliament enter and sit down on their seats during the National Day Parade.

== Music video ==
The simple music video tells Corrinne's life from her childhood day's till the present. The music video opens with a time lapse of Singapore's skyline and slowly a few blocks of skyscrapers fade off the screen. The story later focuses on Corrinne's birthday where her father gets her a Yamaha piano to practice her music.

In the present the now 37-year-old is still seen playing the same piano as her neighbor comes to admire her piece. It is also learnt that she has become a music teacher and at the end of the music video, Corrinne alongside her students, hang up flags of Singapore on to HDB flat railings.

== See also ==
- National Day Parade
- Music of Singapore
