= In a Heartbeat (Sylvia Ratonel song) =

Single by Sylvia Ratonel
- Released: July 5, 2011
- Recorded: 2011
- Genre: Pop
- Length: 4:03
- Label: Eq music
- Songwriter: Haresh Sharma
- Producer: Goh Kheng Long

Official National Day Parade theme song singles chronology
"Song for Singapore" (2010)	"In a Heartbeat" (2011)	"Love At First Light" (2012)

"In a Heartbeat" is a single by Singaporean artiste Sylvia Ratonel. The song was commissioned as the official theme song to the National Day Parade of 2011. The song is one of the few National Day Parade theme songs that do not mention "Singapore" in its lyrics.

== Music video ==
Directed by Brian Gothong Tan, it is the first NDP music video to not feature the performer in it. As with "Song for Singapore"'s music video, it tells the life story of Mother and Son from his childhood years till being a father to Grandson. The short film opens with Mother sewing a sarong for one of her neighbors as Son goes fishing for guppies. A few days later, both Mother and Son move out of their kampung ("Village" in Malay). The time period eventually shifts to the 70's when Son serves his national service and later to the 80's when he gets married. In the 90's Grandson is born to the couple. The video instantly shifts back to previous "memories" from the film before it ends with photographs of Son and his family.

=== Parody ===
Just four weeks after the release of the music video, Singaporean blogger Lee Kin Mun (popularly known as Mr Brown) made an a cappella rendition of the song (as with "What Do You See") in response to the Fun Pack song that was originally part of the NDP early performance segment. The song was removed in the following performances, due to copyright claims from Universal Music and rage from the public as the song is sung to the tune of Lady Gaga's "Bad Romance".

== See also ==
- National Day Parade
- Music of Singapore
