= DMSS =

DMSS may refer to:

- Damai Secondary School in Singapore
- Dar-ul-Mominien Schooling System in Pakistan
