= 国庆日 =

国庆日, 國慶日 (Pinyin: Guóqìngrì, literally National Celebration Day), 国庆节 or 國慶節 (Pinyin: Guóqìngjié, literally National Celebration Festival) are Chinese characters which may refer to:

- National Day of the People's Republic of China (most commonly 国庆节)
- National Day (Singapore) (most commonly 国庆日)
- National Day of the Republic of China (most commonly 國慶日 or 雙十節 Shuāngshíjié)

== See also ==
- National Day, for similar holidays in other countries
