= What Do You See? =

Single by Electrico & Kelvin Tan (Chinese version)
- Released: July 2, 2009
- Recorded: 2009
- Genre: Pop rock, Alternative rock
- Length: 3:44
- Label: Eq music
- Songwriter: Electrico

Official National Day Parade theme song singles chronology
"Shine for Singapore" (2008)	"What Do You See?" (2009)	"Song for Singapore" (2010)

Audio sample
- "What Do You See?": file; help

"What Do You See?" (就在这里 in Mandarin) is a song by Singaporean band Electrico. It was commissioned as the official theme song for the 2009 National Day Parade. The song is one of the few National Day Parade theme songs that does not mention the word "Singapore" in its lyrics. Its lyrics were cited by Prime Minister Lee Hsien Loong in his 2018 National Day Message.

== Music video ==
Directed by Bertrand Lee, the music video opens with a bokeh effect later sharpens to reveal band member David Tan. The camera then traces him around the downtown core of Singapore at dawn as he walks past activities of daily life. He ends up at Marina Barrage by morning, performing with the band for the song's finale.

=== Parody ===
A few weeks after the release of the music video, Singaporean blogger Lee Kin Mun (better known by his pen name, mrbrown) made a parody of the song by the title of "Le Kua Simi" ("See what see" in Hokkien). The parody video was shot in four countries, France, the Netherlands, England and Singapore. The parody discusses the latter's car and his travels.

=== 2014 remake ===
This song was also reused as a new National Day song in 2014 together with the other song, We Will Get There/One People, One Nation, One Singapore, sung by Fauzie Laily, Jack and Rai, Kartik Kunasegaran and Shaun Jansen in its acoustic version.

=== 2025 NDP ===
During the first act of four comprising the 2025 National Day Parade, Electrico performed the song during the multilingual segment.

== See also ==
- Electrico
- National Day Parade
