= Olivia Ong =

Singaporean singer and actress

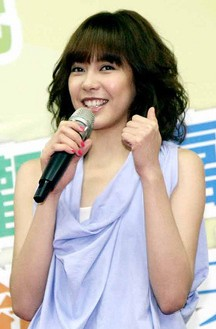
- Olivia Ong in 2010
- Born: Singapore
- Education: Damai Secondary School
- Occupations: Singer; actress
- Years active: 2005–present
- Agents: S2S Pte. Ltd.; H.I.M Music; IMC Live Global Asia
- Awards: Star Awards 2009 : Best Theme Song
- Musical career
- Genres: Bossa nova; Easy listening; Pop
- Instrument: Vocals
- Formerly of: Mirai

Chinese name
- Traditional Chinese: 王儷婷
- Simplified Chinese: 王俪婷
- Hanyu Pinyin: Wáng Lìtíng
- Website: blog.livedoor.jp/oliviaong/

Olivia Ong is a Singaporean singer and actress. Most of her works are in English, but she has recorded songs in Mandarin Chinese, Cantonese and Japanese. In her early career, she focused on singing jazz. Now she has moved on to Mandarin pop.

== Early life ==
Upon her completion of O-Level examinations at Damai Secondary School in Singapore, Ong moved to Japan to further her studies as well as her career as a solo artist. Ong, by then likened to Seiko Matsuda, had won a singing contest and was signed to Japanese recording company S2S Pte Ltd at the age of 15. Her music influences include Nat King Cole and Nina Simone.

== Career ==
Ong formed the J-pop group Mirai in Singapore at the age of 15 with two other Singaporean girls. Their first single, "Open Up Your Mind", was one of the theme songs in the Japanese anime Gensoumaden Saiyuki.

Her début A Girl Meets Bossa Nova was released when she was 19. Tracks include a reinterpretation Frank Sinatra's hits such as Antônio Carlos Jobim's "Quiet Nights of Quiet Stars", among other jazz and pop numbers.

On 17 November 2004, Olivia sang Majulah Singapura at the 2006 FIFA World Cup Asian qualifying rounds (Japan vs Singapore) at Saitama Stadium 2002 before the kick-off.

In 2009, Ong was signed to Taiwanese record company HIM Music and became a big hit back in Singapore after she sang the theme song of the Peranakan-themed drama serial, The Little Nyonya. Her first record under HIM Music was released on 5 March 2010, entitled Olivia. In 2011, Ong recorded a duet, "最後一眼" (Just One Look), with label mate Aaron Yan of Fahrenheit, which was released in his debut EP The Next Me.

In 2011, Ong also appeared in the film It's a Great, Great World (大世界) as Ah Min, a young fashion photographer who stumbled across a set of old photographs taken by her late grandmother (Yvonne Lim). She took the photographs to her grandmother's old friend, Ah Meng (Chew Chor Meng) who might have had connections to the people in the photographs. Ah Meng then proceeds to tell 4 different stories based on each photograph, each telling a story from different generations.

In 2012, Ong has been appointed Music Ambassador of the Global Chinese Music Awards, the second Singaporean artiste to be appointed the role after Joi Chua. In the same year, she also sang the 2012 National Day Parade theme song, "Love at First Light".

Ong appeared on the Mediacorp drama Crescendo in 2015 where she was cast as a singer Alixia. She may also be releasing a new album.

In 2023, Ong performed the 2023 National Day Parade theme song, "Shine Your Light", alongside 53A and ShiggaShay.

== Discography ==
=== Studio albums ===
Date of release	Title	Alternate titles	Remarks
24 March 2005	A Girl Meets Bossanova		
26 October 2005	Precious Stones		
9 August 2006	Tamarillo		
22 November 2006	A Girl Meets Bossanova 2		
6 July 2007	Fall in Love With		
21 November 2007	Touch in the Sky		
20 March 2008	Kiss in the Air		
5 March 2010	Olivia		CD
11 May 2010	Olivia		SACD
1 November 2010	Just for You		
22 July 2011	Romance		
17 May 2013	Waiting	等等	

=== Compilations and live albums ===
Date of release	Title (English)
20 August 2008	Best of Olivia
11 August 2010	夏夜晚風Live影音專輯

=== Singles ===
Date of release	Title	Alternate titles	Remarks
27 September 2023	Azure	光影	

=== As lead singer ===
Year	Title	Name of series	Remarks
2008	如燕	The Little Nyonya	Opening Theme Song
2012	Love at First Light (Feat. Natanya Tan)	National Day Parade 2012	Official Theme Song
2015	梦里家园	The Journey: Our Homeland	Opening Theme Song
2015	梦想起飞	Crescendo	Sub-theme Song
2023	Shine Your Light (feat 53A, ShiggaShay)	National Day Parade 2023	Official Theme Song

== Awards and nominations ==
Year	Award
2011	KKBOX Digital Music Charts Awards; [International Album Charts] – "Olivia"; [International Album Charts] – "夏夜晚風Summer Night LIVE"; [International Single Charts] – "You and Me"; Top 10 Foreign Album in China, "Olivia"; Yahoo! Singapore 9 Youth award; Singapore Hit Awards 2011, Best Local Artiste Award[4]
2012	17th Compass Awards Presentation 2012, Top Local English Pop Song Award (You and Me); Global Chinese Music Awards 2012; Top 20 Hits of the Year(海枯石烂); Outstanding Regional Artiste Award (Singapore)
2013	Nominated for Best Southeast Asian Act(MTV Europe Music Awards); Singapore Hit Awards 2013; Outstanding Regional Artiste Award (Singapore)

=== Star Awards ===
Year	Award	Nominated work	Result
2009	Best Theme Song	The Little Nyonya	Won
2013	Best Theme Song	Yours Fatefully	Nominated
2016	Best Theme Song	The Journey: Our Homeland	Nominated
