= Love at First Light =

Single by Olivia Ong and Natanya Tan
- Released: July 12, 2012
- Recorded: 2012
- Genre: Baroque pop
- Length: 3:41
- Label: Eq music, Universal Music
- Songwriters: Paul Tan and Iskandar Ismail
- Producer: Iskandar Ismail

Official National Day Parade theme song singles chronology
"In a Heartbeat" (2011)	"Love at First Light" (2012)	"One Singapore" (2013)

Audio sample
- "Love At First Light": file; help

"Love at First Light" is a song by Singaporean artiste, Olivia Ong and child actress, Natanya Tan. Written by Paul Tan and composed by Iskandar Ismail, it was officially commissioned as the official theme song to the 2012 National Day Parade of Singapore, together with the 1995 National Day Parade song, My People, My Home which was reused for National Day in 2012. On 9 August, the song was performed twice, once by the Combined School Choirs and later by the duo themselves in a techno pop version. The techno pop version was incorporated into a medley, which includes song like "Stand Up For Singapore", "One People, One Nation, One Singapore", "Count On Me Singapore", "Home" and "We Are Singapore". The song's title is a play on the phrase, "Love at first sight".

== Background ==
Alongside Paul Tan, local composer, Iskandar Ismail teamed up with him to write, produce and compose the song in early 2012. In an interview with Paul Tan on The Straits Times section, "Digital Life", Paul stated that Iskandar wanted a child to sing for the first verse of the song. 7 year old, Natanya Tan was picked along with Olivia as a duet, making Natanya to date the 2nd youngest NDP theme song singer after Shanice Nathan (who was then 7 when she sang the 2004 theme song, "Home"). On 12 July 2012, it was officially announced and released in a press conference at Gardens by the Bay. Olivia gave her comment on the song, stating that "Love At First Light is about the determination of Singaporeans in a young nation, (and how they) are trying to build their dreams and goals.".

== Music video ==
Olivia and Natanya on the observation deck of One Raffles Place in the music video for "Love at First Light".

The video, which was sponsored by the Defence Science and Technology Agency, is directed by Aaron Tan Mien Shawn. It takes viewers through daily life in Singapore and reflects on its cultural identity.

== See also ==
- Music of Singapore
