= Beautiful Seed =

Studio album by Corrinne May
- Released: 2007
- Label: Pink Armchair Records
- Producer: Kavin Hoo and Corrinne May

Corrinne May chronology
| The Gift (2006) | Beautiful Seed (2007) | Crooked Lines (2012) |

Beautiful Seed is the fourth album by Corrinne May, released in 2007 by Warner Music Singapore. S2S Pte. Ltd. released this album in Japan at the same year.

The album has achieved platinum status in Singapore.

== Track listing ==
1. "Love Song for #1"
2. "Shelter"
3. "On the Side of Me"
4. "Five Loaves and Two Fishes"
5. "Beautiful Seed"
6. "Leaving"
7. "Scars (Stronger for Life)"
8. "City of Angels"
9. "My Little Nephew"
10. "Slow Down"
11. "Green-Eyed Monster"
12. "On My Way"
13. "33"
14. "Shelter (Cherry Blossom Edition)"
15. "Little Superhero Girl (Acoustic Version)"(Japan-only bonus track)

=== Bonus track ===
1. "Song for Singapore"

Note'

- Song for Singapore only appears on the deluxe edition of this album.
