= Safe in a Crazy World =

Studio album by Corrinne May
- Released: 2005
- Genre: Delicate/Love Songs
- Label: Pink Armchair Records
- Producer: Kavin Hoo and Corrinne May

Corrinne May chronology
Fly Away (originally titled Corrinne May) (2001)	Safe in a Crazy World (2005)	The Gift (2006)

Professional ratings
Review scores
Source	Rating
Allmusic	4/5 stars

Safe in a Crazy World is the second album by Corrinne May, released in 2005 by the independent Pink Armchair Records label. The album was released in Japan by S2S records and by Warner Music Singapore.

== Track listing ==
1. "Little Superhero Girl"
2. "Save Me"
3. "Free"
4. "Everything in its Time"
5. "Safe in a Crazy World"
6. "Let it Go"
7. "Angel in Disguise"
8. "If I Kissed You"
9. "The Birthday Song"
10. "Every Beat of My Heart"
11. "Free (Radio Edit)"

=== Weekly charts ===
Chart (2005)	Peak position
Singaporean Albums (RIAS)	1
