= Sylvia Ratonel (album) =

Studio album by Sylvia Ratonel
- Released: October 27, 2010
- Recorded: March – October 2010
- Genre: Pop, R&B, jazz, dance
- Label: Universal
- Producer: Don Richmond

Singles from Sylvia Ratonel
- 1. "Fly" Released: May 2010 (radio); 2. "It's Raining" Released: September 2010 (radio); 3. "Mari Bersamaku" Released: December 2010 (radio); 4. "Loving You" Released: 2011 (radio)

Sylvia Ratonel is the eponymous debut studio album by Singaporean singer Sylvia Ratonel. It was released in Singapore on 27 October 2010. The musical direction of the album departed from the usual ballad and acoustic genres Sylvia specialized in during Singapore Idol. Singapore Idol winner Sezairi Sezali and local rapper ShiGGa Shay appear on the album as featured artists.

Upon its release, the album received mixed reviews from online music critics, who doubted Sylvia's songwriting ability and the lack of production of the album, but praised Sylvia's vocal performance. The album has produced four singles, including the 987FM Top 5 hit "It's Raining".

== Composition ==
Apart from a cover of a 1980s song "Manic Monday" and a Malay-language track "Mari Bersamaku", the album consists of completely original tracks co-written by Sylvia and producer Don Richmond. The album features several pop ballads and upbeat R&B tracks. "A Woman And A Man", the duet between Sylvia and Sezairi that was originally found in Sezairi's debut album, was remixed and included in the track list for Sylvia Ratonel as well.

A few songs on the album are personal recounts of Sylvia's life. "Foolish This Way" expresses the emotional experiences of past relationships and was described by her as "very slow, very heartfelt, a tearjerker". "Loving You", the first song she co-wrote with Richmond, was inspired by good life experiences. It was reported that "Come Runaway With Me" was written as an English adaptation to the Malay track "Mari Bersamaku" due to her love for the latter.

== Promotion ==
Sylvia Ratonel was promoted by means of an album launch party exclusive only to people who purchased the album CD. Sylvia performed songs from the album during the event, which was held in The Boiler Room at St James Power Station on November 26, 2010.

=== Singles ===
The album has seen the release of four singles. All of them were released only on radio format as Singapore's music industry generally does not practice CD sales and digital downloads for local singles. It began with the lead single "Fly" in May 2010, a jazz-pop song produced and written by Don Richmond. The single was described as "uplifting and empowering" and "about what a Maybelline girl should be." "Fly" was also featured in a Maybelline New York advertisement to represent "The Power In You" campaign, where Sylvia acts as the spokesperson for Singapore. The song received positive reviews, with many listeners noting that Sylvia's vocal performance in the song was indifferent from international standards. Sylvia performed the song during the Maybelline New York Launch at Cathay Cineleisure Orchard on May 28, 2010. "Fly" narrowly missed the Top 5, peaking at #6 on the Top 20 Chart of 987FM, a pop radio station in Singapore that appeals to younger audiences. However, the song ranked at #73 at the radio's year-end chart.

Her second single, "It's Raining", was released in September 2010 to positive reception. Sylvia performed the acoustic version of the song on Channel NewsAsia and on a results episode of national television show One Moment of Glory. Wider promotion of the song allowed "It's Raining" to outperform "Fly". It became Sylvia's first Top 5 hit when it reached #3 on the 987FM Top 10 Chart. It remained in the 987FM Top 20 for 12 consecutive weeks, although it did not manage to enter the year-end chart. The song is Sylvia's only Top 5 hit to date. "It's Raining" was accompanied by a music video, a first in Sylvia's career, and it was first broadcast nationally on MediaCorp Channel 5 on 19 November 2010. The video has received generally negative reviews from online viewers on YouTube, with most of the criticism highlighting poor directorial skills, unimpressive video editing, a budgeted production and Sylvia's uncomfortable disposition and awkward dancing. As of September 2011, the video has been viewed only 69 000 times, which is 21 000 views short of the video views for Sezairi Sezali's "Broken". As a result, Ratonel does not appear in the music video to her 2011 song, "In A Heartbeat", in effort to avoid backlash.

"Mari Bersamaku" was released as Sylvia's first Malay single (and third overall). It debuted in the Top 20 of the RIA Chartz at 89.7FM in December 2010 and peaked at #11, becoming Sylvia's first single not to reach the Top 10.

Her fourth and final single from Sylvia Ratonel, "Loving You", charted for 7 consecutive weeks inside the 987FM Top 20 Chart and peaked at #8 in March 2011. Both "Mari Bersamaku" and "Loving You" do not have accompanying music videos, possibly due to the negative reception of the "It's Raining" music video or financial constraints.

=== Tour ===
In an interview on Channel NewsAsia, Sylvia expressed hopes of embark on a concert tour to promote the album. However, promotion of the album ended after the release of the fourth single, and coupled with its lackluster sales, a concert tour was not planned.

== Reception ==
=== Critical response ===
Professional ratings
Review scores
Source	Rating
Spin or Bin Music	4/5 stars
The Urban Wire	2/5 stars

The album has received mixed reviews. Online music blog Spin or Bin Music received the album positively, describing it as "a roller coaster ride because it can, and will, take the listener to the emotional highs and lows that are the product of the incredible diversity in the album." Phoenix Leow from The Urban Wire gave the album a negative review, calling it as "a disappointment" and referring to Sylvia's songwriting skill as inexperienced. Leow also mentioned that because the bulk of the album was created with the efforts of only two people, the potential of the album was limited.

=== Commercial performance ===
It is not known if Sylvia Ratonel has achieved any commercial success. Unlike first Singapore Idol winner Taufik Batisah's debut album, which was certified 3× Platinum for selling 30,000 copies nationwide, no sales certification has been announced for Sylvia Ratonel. This may imply underwhelming or moderate sales for the album, which would be attributed significantly by the weak influence of local pop music on Singaporean culture. The album is currently being sold at Gramophone stores at half of its original retail price.

== Track listing ==
No.	Title	Lyrics	Music	Length
1.	"Get Up Everybody"	Don Richmond, Sylvia Ratonel	Don Richmond	4:18
2.	"Fly"	Don Richmond, Sylvia Ratonel	Don Richmond	4:03
3.	"Loving You"	Don Richmond, Sylvia Ratonel	Don Richmond	3:43
4.	"It's Raining"	Don Richmond, Sylvia Ratonel	Don Richmond	4:21
5.	"A Woman And A Man" (featuring Sezairi Sezali)	Jason Tan, Don Richmond, Sezairi Sezali and Sylvia Ratonel	Jason Tan, Don Richmond	5:45
6.	"Mari Bersamaku"	Haramain Osman	Haramain Osman	2:47
7.	"In My Arms Again"	Don Richmond, Sylvia Ratonel	Don Richmond	5:13
8.	"Manic Monday"	Prince	Prince	3:08
9.	"Gimme What You Got"	Don Richmond, Sylvia Ratonel	Don Richmond	4:39
10.	"Fly" (featuring ShiGGa Shay)	Don Richmond, Sylvia Ratonel	Don Richmond	4:04
11.	"Come Runaway With Me"	Don Richmond, Haramain Osman	Haramain Osman	2:48
12.	"Foolish That Way"	Don Richmond, Sylvia Ratonel	Don Richmond	4:02

== Release history ==
Country	Date
Singapore	October 27, 2010
