= Fly Away (Corrinne May album) =

Corrinne May (Fly Away)

Studio album by Corrinne May
- Released: 2001
- Genre: Delicate/Love Songs
- Label: Corrmay Gourmet Music
- Producer: Kavin Hoo

Corrinne May chronology
Corrinne May (Fly Away) (2001)	Safe in a Crazy World (2005)

Fly Away is the first album by Corrinne May, released in 2001 by Corrmay Gourmet Music. It was subsequently released by Yellow Music (M&M) in Singapore, released by the Major Chord label in Japan and by Forward Music in Taiwan and Hong Kong in 2005. The album was subsequently re-released by Playmusic and Warner Music in Singapore.

The album features a song that Corrinne May co-wrote with iconic songwriters Carole King and Carole Bayer Sager, titled "If You Didn't Love Me".

== Track listing ==
1. "Fly Away"
2. "Same Side of the Moon"
3. "Something About You"
4. "Fall to Fly"
5. "If You Didn't Love Me"
6. "Stay on the Road"
7. "Mr. Beasley"
8. "All That I Need"
9. "Walk Away"
10. "Will You Remember Me"
11. "Journey"
12. "Mr. Beasley (unplugged)"
