= All I Want Is... =

我只是想要 All I Want Is...

Studio album by Kelvin Tan
- Released: 11 January 2006
- Genre: Mandopop
- Label: Play Music

Kelvin Tan chronology
我只是想要 All I Want Is... (2006)	i伟联 (2007)

All I Want Is... (Chinese: 我只是想要; pinyin: wǒ zhǐ shì xiǎng yào) is Kelvin Tan's (simplified Chinese: 陈伟联; traditional Chinese: 陳偉聯; pinyin: chén wěi lián) debut solo album in Singapore.

== Track listing ==
=== Original CD Edition ===
The original edition of the disc was released on 11 January 2006 in Singapore and 26 January 2006 in Malaysia.

==== CD1 (Today) ====
The first disc of the album, named "Today", features Kelvin Tan's 4 new songs and his covers of some songs he had sung before in Project SuperStar Season 1 (2005).

1. 我只是想要 All I Want Is...
2. 爱.恨.难 Love . Hate
3. 朋友 一直都在 Forever Friends
4. 触摸 Touch
5. 孤单的夜里我不孤单 (2006 年新版本) Lonely Night I'm Not Lonely
6. 火柴天堂 (2006 年新版本) Matchstick Heaven
7. 我真的受伤了 (2006 年新版本) Truly Hurt
8. 走出黑暗的世界 (2006 年新版本) Out Of The Darkness
9. Heaven Knows (2006 年新版本)
10. 童话 (2006 年新版本) Fable
11. 其实你不懂我的心 (2006 年新版本) You Don't Know My Heart

==== CD2 (Yesterday) ====
The second disc of the album, named "Yesterday", features Kelvin Tan's cover of famous old Chinese songs.

1. 月亮代表我的心 Moon Represents My Heart
2. 一剪梅 Plum Blossom
3. 外婆的澎湖湾 Grandma's Bay

=== CD+MV VCD Edition ===
This second edition of the album did not contain the "Yesterday" disc as in the original CD edition but instead in its place is a VCD containing Music Videos of the first five tracks of the album

==== CD ====
1. 我只是想要 All I Want Is...
2. 爱.恨.难 Love . Hate (伟联首部电视剧[梦拼图]片尾曲)
3. 朋友 一直都在 Forever Friends (伟联首部电视剧[梦拼图]片尾曲)
4. 触摸 Touch (感人电视剧[星闪闪]主题曲)
5. 孤单的夜里我不孤单 (2006 年新版本) Lonely Night I'm Not Lonely
6. 火柴天堂 (2006 年新版本) Matchstick Heaven
7. 我真的受伤了 (2006 年新版本) Truly Hurt
8. 走出黑暗的世界 (2006 年新版本) Out Of The Darkness
9. Heaven Knows (2006 年新版本)
10. 童话 (2006 年新版本) Fable
11. 其实你不懂我的心 (2006 年新版本) You Don't Know My Heart

==== VCD ====
1. 我只是想要 All I Want Is...
2. 触摸 Touch
3. 爱.恨.难 Love . Hate
4. 朋友 一直都在 Forever Friends
5. 孤单的夜里我不孤单 (2006 年新版本) Lonely Night I'm Not Lonely

=== All I Want Is... Singing Karaoke ===
我只是想要...唱卡拉OK (pinyin: wǒ zhǐ shì xiǎng yào chàng kǎ lā OK; English; All I Want Is... Singing Karaoke) contains a VCD of the karaoke videos of some songs in All I Want Is...

1. 我只是想要 All I Want Is...
2. 爱.恨.难 Love . Hate (伟联首部电视剧[梦拼图]片尾曲)
3. 朋友 一直都在 Forever Friends (伟联首部电视剧[梦拼图]片尾曲)
4. 触摸 Touch (感人电视剧[星闪闪]主题曲)
5. 孤单的夜里我不孤单 Lonely Night I'm Not Lonely
6. 火柴天堂 Matchstick Heaven
7. Heaven Knows
8. 我真的受伤了 Truly Hurt
9. 月亮代表我的心 Moon Represents My Heart
10. 其实你不懂我的心 (Live 版本) You Don't Know My Heart (Live)

== Achievements ==
- 10,000 copies sold on day of inception (January 11, 2006)
- 15,000 copies of the album sold within 5 days of inception in Singapore (Platinum Award)
- Double Platinum Award in Singapore
- Touch won "Best Theme Song" in Singapore's Star Awards 2006
