= Kelvin Tan =

Singaporean musician (1981)

Kelvin Tan Wei Lian
- Born: Kelvin Tan Wei Lian; 5 October 1981 (age 45); Singapore
- Occupation: Singer
- Years active: 2005–2006; 2009–present
- Spouse: Inez Hung (m. 2022)

Chinese name
- Traditional Chinese: 陳偉聯
- Simplified Chinese: 陈伟联
Transcriptions
Standard Mandarin
- Hanyu Pinyin: Chén Wěilián
- Musical career
- Genre: Mandopop
- Labels: Play Music (2005–2006); Warner Music (2006–2007); Skyhigh Entertainment Co., Ltd (2009–present)

Kelvin Tan Wei Lian (陈伟联, born 5 October 1981) is a Singaporean Mandopop singer who earned a living as a busker before he won the first edition of Project SuperStar in 2005. He has released three albums, All I Want Is... (2006), i-Weilian (2007) and Moving Notes...Kelvin Tan (2009). He also had a solo concert at the Singapore Expo, lead a choir at the opening ceremony at the 2008 Summer Paralympics, and singing Singapore's 2009 National Day Parade's theme song.

== Early life ==
Born blind due to Leber's congenital amaurosis (which causes the retina to disintegrate), Tan grew up listening to 1980s Mandopop ballads, which inspired him to learn to play the piano and guitar. He studied at the Singapore School for the Visually Handicapped and Dunearn Secondary School. After his O-Levels, he worked as a massage therapist and a singer at a café. He also busked at Jurong East and Waterloo Street, playing his guitar and singing Mandopop ballads for two to eight hours per day. According to The New Paper reporter Mindy Tan, his performances drew large crowds (including Malays and Indians), some of whom were so "impressed [by] his music" that they would "sit on the pavement nearby for up to an hour listening to him".

== Project SuperStar ==
Tan and four blind friends auditioned for the inaugural season of Project SuperStar, but only he was accepted as a contestant. Throughout the competition, there was extensive debate over whether viewers were voting for him out of sympathy and whether a blind man who could not dance deserved the title.

Tan emerged as the male champion and entered the grand final against female champion Kelly Poon. The judges gave Poon more favourable reviews, but Tan garnered 64% of the 533,000 telephone votes. Both finalists also released limited edition singles; Tan's cover of Fairytale (童话) by Michael Wong sold 12,239 copies, while Poon's cover of Lost Goodness (遗失的美好) by Angela Chang sold 11,319 copies. Thus, Tan became the grand champion and was awarded a recording contract with Play Music.

== Music career ==
Tan's debut album All I Want Is... (我只是想要), which contains four original songs and all of his famous competition recordings including Fairytale (童话), Matchstick Heaven (火柴天堂), Heaven Knows, 其实你不懂我的心, etc., was certified platinum in Singapore within five days of its release. Its title track topped the Singapore music charts in February 2006, while another of its songs, Touch (触摸 ), won Best Theme Song at the 2006 Star Awards. The debut album also had another TOP chart hit 爱恨难. In total, the album sold 45,000 copies in Singapore and 15,000 copies in Malaysia.

In 2006, Tan staged a solo concert at the Max Pavilion of the Singapore Expo, which sold 5,000 seats.

In 2007, his second album, i-Weilian (i伟联), was released and the song Ordinary Man (普通的人) topped the Singapore charts that October. Besides Ordinary Man, I Love You also hit Number 1 regionally in the Global Music Chart, which consolidates chart results from Taiwan, Hong Kong, China, Malaysia and Singapore. His 3rd single, 亲爱的请做个好梦, from the album also hit TOP 5 in Singapore's YES 933 醉心龙虎榜 chart. This album eventually sold 15,000 copies in Singapore and 20,000 copies in Taiwan.

In 2008, Tan and Sun Yajun led a choir rendition of the song, On The Same Blue Planet (同在蓝色星球上), at the opening ceremony of the 2008 Summer Paralympics sailing regatta at Qingdao, China.

In 2009, Kelvin released his third album, Moving Notes...Kelvin Tan (走场陈伟联). This critically acclaimed original album includes his self composed melodies with the biggest lyricists in Chinese music, including Liang Wern Fook, Albert Leung, 小寒, Yao Qian (姚谦), Daryl Yeo (姚若龙), 吴玉康, Lo-Jung Chen, Kevin Yi, etc. It also included a popular interpretation of Chang Yu-sheng's 大海, which had Kelvin playing the piano in the sea in the music video. The songs from the album, Forever Friends (永远的朋友) and Break Up Letter (分手的请书) topped the Singapore charts in October 2009, while the album peaked at 5th in the Taiwan charts in February 2010. In addition, 分手的请书 won two awards at the 2010 Singapore Entertainment Awards and 我们 (Together) won Best Theme Song at the 2010 Star Awards. However, his contract with Warner Music expired in September 2010 and was not renewed.

In 2009, he was selected to sing Right Here (就在这里), the Mandarin version of the National Day Parade theme song What Do You See?, and four years later, he sang a tribute song to Singapore named Treasure Every Moment.

In July 2017, Kelvin released brand new Mandarin album 新谣 (The Singapore Songbook), which is a tribute to the heritage of local writers and compositions in Singapore. In it, Kelvin interprets household classic tunes from the 80s, 90s and 00s; including Liang's Friendship Forever (细水长流), 夜的眩晕, 让夜轻轻落下, Dick Lee's Home, Roy Li's 等你等到我心痛, Eric Moo's 你是我的唯一, 情谊藏心里, among others. The album was released digitally only and topped the charts at iTunes. The album design was also conceptually done by Singapore renowned artist 阿果.

In 2017, Kelvin's multi-language rendition of a National Day song medley went viral, amassing over 300,000 views on his page alone. The medley consisted of English, Chinese, Malay and Tamil National Day songs, and was highly praised for the sensitivity and fluency of Kelvin's interpretation. The same video went viral again in 2019 to a whole new audience.

In 2019, Kelvin was invited to perform the theme song, 守护你的善良, for Mediacorp's Channel 8 TV Drama, You Can Be An Angel 3 (你也可以是天使3). The song was a hit and well received by audience which won the title of Best TV Drama Theme Song at the 2019 Star Awards.

== Acting career ==
He acted in the getai movie 881 and several television serials (notably The Dream Chasers), winning Most Popular Newcomer at the 2006 Star Awards. However, he declined further roles, describing acting as "not [his] cup of tea because there's nothing else [he] could act as except a blind man". He also participated in variety television shows in Singapore (notably as a guest judge on Campus Superstar) and Taiwan (such as Happy Sunday), but some Taiwanese hosts rejected him over fears that their jokes would offend him. Another controversy arose when he was a contestant on the Singapore Mandarin edition of Don't Forget The Lyrics, as netizens were concerned that being unable to see the monitor would disadvantage him.

== Sports career ==
In 2015, Tan represented Singapore in Goalball at the 2015 ASEAN Para Games held in Singapore.

== Accolades ==
Year	Ceremony	Award	Nominated work	Result
2006	Star Awards	Best Theme Song	The Shining Star	Won
2006	Star Awards	Top 10 Most Popular Male Artistes	—N/a	Won
2006	Star Awards	Best Newcomer	—N/a	Won
2010	Star Awards	Best Theme Song	Together	Won
2013	Star Awards	Best Theme Song	Show Hand	Nominated
2015	Star Awards	Best Theme Song	The Journey: Tumultuous Times	Won
2019	Star Awards	Best Theme Song	You Can Be An Angel 3	Won

== Philanthropy ==
Due to his disability and achievements, Tan has been an ambassador for several local disability awareness campaigns and performed in various charity shows, including a concert to raise funds for victims of the 2008 Sichuan earthquake. In his spare time, he works as a guide for the Singapore edition of Dialogue in the Dark, an exhibition that helps sighted people understand the experiences of blind people.

== Personal life ==
Tan lives in a four-room HDB flat in western Singapore, together with his father (a mechanic), mother (a housewife), and younger sister (a research analyst). Despite his success, he continues to take public transport, eat at hawker centres and go out with friends. He enjoys bowling and was one of only two totally blind Singaporeans who played the sport competitively, even winning a competition organised by the blind associations of Singapore and Perth. In 2012, he picked up running, joined RunningHour (a running club for people with disabilities) and participated in the 10 km run of the Singapore Marathon.

In 2020, Tan was engaged. Tan was married to his wife Inez Hung two years later after having met through golfball games.

Preceded by N/A	Winner of Project SuperStar; 2005	Succeeded by Daren Tan
