= I-Weilian =

i伟联 i-Weilian

Studio album by Kelvin Tan
- Released: 31 August 2007
- Genre: Mandopop
- Label: Warner Music

Kelvin Tan chronology
我只是想要 (2006)	i伟联 i-Weilian (2007)	TBA

i伟联 (simplified Chinese: i伟联; traditional Chinese: i偉聯; pinyin: aì wěi lián) is Kelvin Tan (simplified Chinese: 陈伟联; traditional Chinese: 陳偉聯; pinyin: chén wěi lián)'s debut solo album in Taiwan and it is his second album in Singapore. The Taiwan version was released on 31 August 2007 while the Singapore version was released on 18 September 2007.

== Track listing ==
=== Taiwan Debut Version ===
The Taiwan version of the album, being Kelvin's debut album there, contains tracks from his debut Singapore album.

1. Intro
2. I Love You (我爱你)
3. 爱恨难
4. 小人物的心声
5. 普通的人
6. 我只是想要
7. 路边一棵榕树下
8. 触摸
9. 火柴天堂
10. 残留
11. Heaven Knows
12. 孤单的夜里我不孤单
13. 我会用真心填满你的孤单
14. 亲爱的.做个好梦

=== Singapore Version ===
The Singapore Version though, did not contain tracks from Kelvin's debut album and it contained additional tracks not in the Taiwan Debut Version.

1. Intro
2. I Love You (我爱你)
3. 普通的人
4. 路边一棵榕树下
5. 犯错 (与蔡淳佳对唱)
6. 我会用真心填满你的孤单
7. 残留
8. 小人物的心声
9. 亲爱的.做个好梦
10. 念念不忘 (电影[881]插曲)
11. 我用真心填满你的孤单 (Acoustic Version)

=== Singapore Repackaged Edition ===
Due to I-Weilian(Singapore version)'s overwhelming success, the album was repackaged and released in November 2007. The acoustic version of 我用真心填满你的孤单 (pinyin: wǒ yòng zhēn xīn tián mán ní dé gú dān; English: I'll Use My Heart to Fill Your Loneliness;) was removed and 3 Kelvin Tan's covers of well-known oldies were included.

1. Intro
2. I Love You (我爱你)
3. 普通的人
4. 路边一棵榕树下
5. 犯错 (与蔡淳佳 对唱)
6. 我会用真心填满你的孤单
7. 残留
8. 小人物的心声
9. 亲爱的.做个好梦
10. 念念不忘 (电影[881]插曲)
11. 在水一方 (Unplugged)
12. 绿岛小夜曲 (Unplugged)
13. 往事只能回味
14. Beautiful Girl

== Achievements ==
1. 6000 copies of the album were sold in Singapore as of 6 October 2007.
