= 53A (band) =

Singaporean pop/rock band

- Origin: Singapore
- Genres: Pop, rock, punk rock, alternative rock
- Years active: 2003–present
- Label: Independent
- Members: Sara Wee; Bani Hidir; Helman Kamal; Lisa Haryono; Amir Shazwan
- Past members: Alvin Khoo; Irwan Shah Salleh; Ying Chng; Serena Chen; Nazaruddin Mashruddin; Addy Rasidi

53A is a Singaporean pop/rock band formed by lead vocalist/rhythm guitarist Sara Wee and lead guitarist Alvin Khoo in 2003.

== History ==
=== 2003–2010: Formation, Settle the Kettle ===
In 2003, Alvin Khoo was introduced to Sara Wee through a mutual friend. Wee, who had been trained in classical music, and Khoo, who played the guitar back in secondary school, bonded over the love for music, and started jamming songs together in the attic of a shop along Haji Lane, the unit number of which they got the band name from. The duo went on to perform together in the live music scene for nearly six years until they recruited their friends, Bani Hidir and Irwan Shah, on bass guitar and drums respectively.

They released their debut studio album, Settle the Kettle on 1 September 2010, featuring original compositions written by Wee, Khoo and Bani. The album received positive reviews in TODAY, The Business Times and TIME. They launched an island-wide tour promoting their album from September to November 2010.

=== 2010–present: Lineup changes, "Tomorrow's Here Today" ===
In December 2010, Chng Hui Ying, better known as Ying Chng, joined the band on keyboards. In May 2011, Serena Chen joined the band as a percussionist. She became a permanent member the band in March 2013. Irwan Shah left the band in May 2013 to focus more on his career as a music examiner, and was replaced by Helman Kamal.

In May 2014, Ying Chng left the band as she was on maternity leave. Her replacement, Nazaruddin Mashruddin, is also the keyboardist for The Good Life Project and neoDominatrix, and has played for THELIONCITYBOY, Sezairi Sezali and Gentle Bones.

In 2016, 53A was chosen to sing the theme song for the National Day Parade 2016, "Tomorrow's Here Today", which was written by Don Richmond. This made them the second Singaporean band to do so, after Electrico.

In October 2016, the band announced that Serena Chen would no longer appear in their live gigs as she would be embarking on her journey with Sela Cajon, but would occasionally appear as a guest musician. On January 1, 2019, they announced that Nazaruddin Mashruddin had left the band after 5 years.

In 2023 and 2026, 53A performed at the National Day Parade.

== Influences ==
53A has cited John Mayer, The Beatles, Foo Fighters and The Click Five as their influences.

== Members ==
=== Current members ===
- Sara Wee – lead and backing vocals, rhythm guitar, keyboards (2003–present)
- Bani Hidir – bass guitar, lead and backing vocals, drums (2009–present)
- Helman Kamal – drums, backing vocals, bass guitar (2013–present)
- Lisa Haryono – keyboards, backing vocals (2019–present)
- Amir Shazwan – lead guitar (2023–present)

=== Past members ===
- Alvin Khoo – lead guitar, backing vocals (2003–2022)
- Irwan Shah Salleh – drums (2009–2013)
- Ying Chng – keyboards (2010–2014)
- Serena Chen – percussion (2013–2016)
- Nazaruddin Mashruddin – keyboards (2014–2019)
- Addy Rasidi – lead guitar (2022–2023)

== Discography ==
=== Albums ===
- Settle the Kettle (2010)
