= Moving Notes...Kelvin Tan =

走唱陈伟联 Moving Notes Kelvin Tan

Studio album by Kelvin Tan
- Released: 9 August 2009
- Genre: Mandopop
- Label: Warner Music

Kelvin Tan chronology
i伟联 i-Weilian (2007)	走唱陈伟联 Moving Notes Kelvin Tan (2009)	TBA

Moving Notes Kelvin Tan (simplified Chinese: 走唱陈伟联; traditional Chinese: 走唱陳偉聯; pinyin: zou chang chen wei lian) is Kelvin Tan's 3rd solo album in Singapore.

== Track listing ==
=== Original CD Edition ===
The original edition of the disc was released on 9 August 2009 in Singapore

==== CD ====
1. 孤单好吗 How Are You, Loneliness
2. 永远的朋友 Forever Friends
3. 星光伴我心 Stars With My Heart
4. 心有灵犀 Telepathy
5. 分手的情书 Break Up Letter
6. 和你同名的星星 Same Star
7. 圆规 Divider
8. 宁愿 I'd Rather
9. 寂寞之国 Lonely City
10. 重生 Reborn
11. 大海 The Big Sea
12. 就在这里 Right Here (Bonus Track: Singapore's National Day 09 Chinese Version of Theme Song)
