= Damai LRT station =

Damai LRT station may refer to:

- Damai LRT station (Malaysia)
- Damai LRT station (Singapore)
