= Damai Secondary School =

- 达迈中学; Sekolah Menengah Damai

Location
- 4800 Bedok Reservoir Road; Bedok, 479229; Singapore; 1.3371°N 103.9270°E

Information
- Type: Government
- Motto: Aspire, Explore, Achieve
- Established: 1994
- Session: Single session
- School code: 3056
- Principal: Chan Wan Siong
- Colour: Maroon White
- Website: damaisec.moe.edu.sg

Damai Secondary School (DMSS) is a co-educational government secondary school in Bedok, Singapore.

== History ==
DMSS was established in 1994. The school has been expanded several times. In 2000, the National Education corner was added. Between 2002 and 2004 the school was upgraded under the PRIME programme, enlarging and improving the school facilities.

In 2002 and 2003, DMSS came 49th in Singapore in its express stream results. In 2002 it was awarded the People Developer Standard. This was renewed in 2005 for another three years. Its technical stream was awarded the 30th Singapore NUTMEG Prize. This was presented by the managing director, Chang Yeng Yong.

DMSS has strong emphasis on National Education (NE) and was awarded the Outstanding Development Award NE from 2006-2010. Its NE framework includes student leadership development, student-centric processes, NE integrated curriculum & establishing strategic partnerships with the community. The school was successful in creating a Borderless Learning environment in 2010 using mobile devices, WiFi & Bluetooth technology. The school's inter-disciplinary Project Work is integrated with the use of ICT. In 2008, the school introduced the use of mobile learning, using Bluetooth-enabled handphones to engage its lower and upper secondary students. The school shared its mobile learning approach at the Int'l Conference on Teaching & Learning with Technology (ICTLT) at Suntec City. Damai Secondary currently utilises iPad 10th Generations as part of the National Digital Literacy Programme.

=== Merger with Bedok North Secondary School ===
Bedok North Secondary School was founded in 1981. It briefly shared a campus with Temasek Secondary School for a year before Temasek relocated to its new campus along Bedok North Avenue 3. It was relocated again on 4 December 1999 to its current premises at 20 Jalan Damai in order to accommodate the increasing number of staff and students. Due to a fall in enrolment, Bedok North was closed on 1 January 2018 and its operations merged with DMSS.

== Culture and identity ==
=== Uniform and discipline ===
Students wear a white shirt/blouse with a maroon school tie and white trousers (for boys) or a maroon skirt (for girls). Boys in secondary 1 and secondary 2 wear short trousers before they start wearing long trousers from secondary 3 onwards.

The school formerly used a demerit point system to maintain discipline. Upon accumulating a certain number of demerit points, students were subject to disciplinary actions such as detention, caning (for boys only) or suspension. In 1997, the principal James Ong told the Los Angeles Times that caning was administered at DMSS for offences such as fighting or disrespecting a teacher. "We do not seek permission from parents", he said. "We will cane first and inform you later. Parents must trust us to give the child a good education. We have the welfare of the children in mind."

=== School logo ===
Designed by Samuel Teo Gek Seng, the DMSS logo incorporates the initials DSS, forming the seed of education which is of primary importance in the formative years of young people and which when carefully planted will grow into flames of faith, hope, and charity, the three components of the school motto.

=== House affiliations ===
DMSS house of the year trophy

From 1994-2015, to encourage a competitive spirit, DMSS has a house system comprising four houses. They are the Achievers (Red), Strivers (Blue), Victors (Green), and Winners (Yellow).

At the start of every year, each new student starting in Secondary 1 is allocated by the PE department into one of these houses, based on his/her index number in class.

There are regular house meetings for the selection of new house leaders, and allowing the house members to decide if they want to join in a particular sports events on sports day. Following the house meetings there are house-related activities such as sports or quizzes.

There is a cumulative points system, strengthened by participation in sport or other events. At the end of the year, the house that has accumulated the most points is declared "house of the year", winning the trophy of the house of the year.

== Campus ==
DMSS has a main building including a general-purpose hall, about 40 to 50 classrooms (including the Geography and History Rooms), an AV Theatre, Media Resource Library, four Computer Labs, two Physics Labs, two Biology Labs, two Chemistry Labs, Staff Common Rooms, a Canteen, a bookshop, general office, conference room, two FCE (home economics) kitchens, Retail Operations room, Design and Technology staff room, D&T Innovation Lab, a T&L lab, and a cafeteria.

There is a "Harmony Room" with exhibits on the different races in Singapore and their unique cultures, and the school's history, and an “Edge”, which serves as a place for students to unwind during and after school. This “Edge” is currently undergoing a redesign, with the revamp expected to end around Q1 of 2027.

Damai has developed a "wireless mobile learning environment" through the use of Bluetooth or WiFi technology. This allows students to use their smartphones (with the teachers' permission) in class to send answers to questions that their teachers sent using their own mobile phones or notebooks. (This has since been replaced by Personal Learning Devices, under the National Digital Literacy Programme.) This also allows students to complete assignments as many projects are to be done online, on Microsoft or PowerPoint.

== Academic information ==
Being an integrated secondary school, DMSS offers three academic streams, namely the Group 3, Group 2, and Group 1 academic tracks, which were previously referred to as Express, Normal (Academic), and Normal (Technical).

=== O Level Express Course ===
The Express Course is a nationwide four-year programme that leads up to the Singapore-Cambridge GCE Ordinary Level examination.

=== Normal Course ===
The Normal Course is a nationwide 4-year programme leading to the Singapore-Cambridge GCE Normal Level examination, which runs either the Normal (Academic) curriculum or Normal (Technical) curriculum.

==== Normal (Academic) Course ====
In the Normal (Academic) course, students offer 5-8 subjects in the Singapore-Cambridge GCE Normal Level examination. Compulsory subjects include:

- English Language
- Mother Tongue Language
- Mathematics
- Combined Humanities

A 5th year leading to the Singapore-Cambridge GCE Ordinary Level examination is available to students in Normal (Academic) course who perform well in their Singapore-Cambridge GCE Normal Level examination. Students can move from one course to another based on their performance and the assessment of the school principal and teachers.

==== Normal (Technical) Course ====
The Normal (Technical) course prepares students for a technical-vocational education at the Institute of Technical Education. Students will offer 5-7 subjects in the Singapore-Cambridge GCE Normal Level examination. The curriculum is tailored towards strengthening students’ proficiency in English and Mathematics. Students take English Language, Mathematics, Basic Mother Tongue and Computer Applications as compulsory subjects.

=== Twinning and exchange projects ===
In view of rising globalisation, Damai has realised the need for interaction with other schools all over the world, for more resources and better strategies.

To this end, in June 2006, DMSS entered a bilateral "sister schools" link with Dongpo Experimental Middle School (DEMS) (in Emeishan City, China) in March–June 2006. In the process, two department heads from Damai were sent to Emeishan City to visit the school, and to sign the agreement.

Twinning immersion projects have been held for some DEMS students visiting Singapore. Their activities in Singapore included curriculum immersion lessons, CCA hands-on, and NELJ. Meanwhile, administrative staff accompanying the students learned about the Singapore's education system, and the mode of operation in a typical Singaporean secondary school.

In 2009, DMSS has established an Internationalization Committee to further develop cross-cultural learning and relation-building with people of other countries.

== Co-curricular activities (CCAs) ==
Damai Softball Team

As an integral part of Singapore's educational system, DMSS has planned for suitable CCA programmes to teach pupils skills, inculcate in them the correct values and desirable social attitudes, and provide for healthy recreation. Performing groups include, Guzheng, Modern dance, School choir (Damaivoice) and Symphonic band (DMSSBAND. Sports and Games includes canoeing, netball, softball and rugby. Uniformed Groups includes Girl Guides, NCC, NPCC. Clubs and Societies include The Art Club, Info Communications Club.

=== Student Parliament ===
Members of the Student Parliament are known as student councillors, or simply "councillors". Entry is based on a teacher's recommendation or nomination when the student is in Secondary 1. Councillors obtain LEAPS CCA points under the "Leadership" category, and are given certain rights over other ordinary students' discipline. Councillors must wear a special school tie and a name badge with the word "Student Councillor" on it. With effect from 2008, Student Councillors, Peer Leaders and National Education Ambassadors merged to form the Damai Student Leadership body, known as Student Leaders. The Student Leaders represent the student population of DMSS and have organized many school events. The Student Leaders organize events like the Secondary 1 Orientation Camp and Teachers’ Day celebrations yearly. The Student Leaders are also actively involved in other events like the Sports Day, Meet-the-Parents sessions and Prom Ball. The Student Leaders also assist in the running of the school, which includes morning and weekly assembly duties. Student Leaders actively spread National Education messages to the student population, extend community and national outreach and promote the school image and pride.

== Notable alumni ==
- Olivia Ong, singer
