= Home (Kit Chan song) =

Single by Kit Chan
- B-side: "Home 家 (Mandarin version)"
- Released: 1998
- Recorded: 1998
- Genre: Pop, R&B
- Label: Ocean Butterflies
- Songwriter: Dick Lee
- Producer: Kit Chan

Official National Day (Singapore) song singles chronology
"One People, One Nation, One Singapore" (1990)	"Home" (1998)	"Together" (1999)

"Home" is a Singaporean song produced by Kit Chan and composed by Dick Lee. It was one of the first in a series of periodic songs commissioned for Singapore's National Day Parade, together with the other NDP song that year titled as "City For The World". Released in 1998, it is sung in English with the Mandarin version being its B-side, both sung by Chan. Since its release, the song has been praised by music critics and the English version has been considered to be one of the most iconic patriotic songs that represents Singapore.

== Background and release ==
The song was originally written for the Sing Singapore festival, which was aimed to inspire Singaporeans with a sense of community spirit and foster a united national identity.

In 2010, Chan performed the song at the 2010 National Day Parade. In 2011, the music video of a new arrangement of the song was launched on Total Defence Day. Chan is the executive producer of the music video. The new arrangement was performed by 39 local singers (including Chan), accompanied by the Singapore Symphony Orchestra.

On 25 April 2020 at 7:55 pm (SGT), all Mediacorp, SPH Radio and So Drama! Entertainment stations aired a rendition of "Home" by celebrities and musicians to commemorate the efforts of frontline and migrant workers during the COVID-19 pandemic. Another video featuring ordinary Singaporeans was aired at 10:30 pm the same day. In 2023, Chan remade "Home" for its 25th anniversary.

In August 2026, "Home" was released on vinyl by local studio ART/ST Records. Released in an edition of 61 copies to mark Singapore's 61st year of independence, each record was signed by Chan and custom-cut in the shape of the island of Singapore.

== Covers by foreign artists ==
The song has also gained popularity outside of Singapore, and has been at times covered by foreign artists when performing their concerts in Singapore. In 2023, American rock band Weezer, led by Rivers Cuomo, covered the song during their 2023 concert. In 2024, South Korean artist Solar, who is also the leader and vocalist of girl group Mamamoo and its sub-unit Mamamoo+, covered the song during her concert in Singapore.
