= Electrico =

Singaporean band (1996–1997, 2003–present)

- Origin: Singapore; 1996–1997 (Electric Company); 2003–present (Electric Co.)
- Genres: Indie rock New Wave; Post-Punk Revival
- Years active: 1996–1997, 2003–present
- Labels: Universal Music (2003–2008); Warner Music (Present)
- Members: David Tan; Desmond Goh; William Lim Jr.
- Past members: Keith Colaco (1996–1997); Daniel Sassoon (2003–2008); Amanda Ling (2004–2009)
- Website: www.electricomusic.com

Electrico is a Pop rock and Indie Singaporean band originally formed as Electric Company in Singapore in 1996. The band released three albums, from 2004 to 2008; as of 2026 the band is still active, with original members Desmond Goh, William Lim Jr. and David Tan.

== History ==
=== 1996–1997: Formation ===
Electric Company was formed when Keith Colaco, Desmond Goh, William Lim Jr. and David Tan got together to entertain for a fun fair at their neighbourhood church. The band initially practised in an abandoned steel cargo container. After three years of heavy gigging in the underground Singapore indie scene and developing a quasi cult status, the lack of support for local music and other problems forced Colaco to leave. The band continued briefly as a three piece but disbanded a year later.

=== 2003–2005: Reformation and rename ===
In 2003, lead guitarist Daniel Sassoon of Singaporean indie band Livonia joined the band. Soon after, the band's name was shortened from Electric Company to Electric Co., and finally to Electrico. Keyboardist Amanda Ling, talent-scouted by the band members, joined the band that same year.

In August 2004, Electrico released its debut album So Much More Inside. Their debut single "I Want You" peaked at No. 1 on Singapore radio station Perfect 10 98.7 FM's official Top20 weekly countdown chart in October 2004, as well as radio station Power98. Subsequent singles "Runaway" and "Good Time" also appeared on the charts.

On 26 September 2005, the band was nominated in the Favorite Singapore Artist category at the MTV Asia Awards, which was repositioned as a global benefit for victims of the 2004 Indian Ocean earthquake and tsunami. As a result, they became the first Singapore band to be nominated at the regional music TV channel's awards.

Electrico played alongside Rivermaya, a rock band from the Philippines, at the latter's first showcase in Singapore that took place at Bar None, Marriott Hotel in October 25, 2005. The band stated that they were collaborating with Rivermaya on a song in their upcoming album.

On December 3, 2004, the band performed at Orchard Jam along with fellow Singapore rock band Ronin.

The band has performed live shows in the Southeast Asia region, including the Baybeats music festival in Singapore and the Pattaya International Music Festival in Thailand. The band opened for The Bravery when the New York-based band came to perform live in Singapore.

=== 2006–2007: Rise through the Ranks ===
After several months of promotions – with the band giving sneak previews of a few tracks from Hip City at a few of their gigs – the band was back in the studio to begin work on Hip City around August 2005. Initially scheduled for a late December 2005 release, it was later pushed back to 22 June 2006, due to several delays.

"Love In New Wave", the first single of Hip City, subsequently went on to become Electrico's second song to reach No.1 on 987FM's (Note: Continuation of the previous Perfect 10 98.7 FM charts, after the radio station was rebranded as 987FM in 2005) official Top 10 weekly countdown chart on 22 September 2006. The single also later went on to top the charts in the Philippines. The music video for "Love In New Wave" was shot mostly inside Ministry Of Sound, Club Happy and at Haji Lane. It was directed by Carl Siahaan. Siahaan's sister, model/actress Desiree Siahaan, made a guest appearance in the video.

Frontman David Tan revealed that all the songs in Hip City describe and reflected the then-current Singaporean music scene.

In November 2006, Electrico released their second single, a ballad called "Hello".

"Love in New Wave" charted No.32 in 987FM's Top100 Countdown of 2006. Electrico also won the 2006 Local Act of the Year accolade in 987FM's Top100 Special Category Nomination.

"Love in New Wave" also snagged the No.16 position in Power98's Top30 of 2006.

In February 2007, 987FM announced that Electrico's third single was to be "We're Not Made in the USA". During an interview with 987FM's Muttons in the Morning on 16 February 2007, Electrico announced that as soon as they returned from their USA trip, they would embark on an indefinite break to concentrate on writing new material for their upcoming still as-yet untitled third album.

"Hello" debuted at No. 17 in the 987FM Top 20 weekly chart, the highest debut for the week ending on 23 February 2007. It reached its peak position of No.8 in the week ending on 16 March 2007 on the same chart. Eventually, it dropped to No.19 in the week ending on 13 April 2007, and finally bowed out from the 987FM Top 20 in the week ending on 20 April 2007.

On 26 February 2007, Singapore broadsheet The Straits Times reported that Electrico's break from the limelight was scheduled to be from six months to a year, and that they would return sometime in late March 2008. Lead guitarist Sassoon was quoted saying, "The break will give us time to recuperate, evaluate the band and write new material."

On 21 May 2007, Electrico won their second Top Local English Pop Song award at the 12th COMPASS awards ceremony for "Good Time".

=== 2008–2009: We Satellites, National Day parade theme song ===
On 10 March 2008, Electrico uploaded a new song, "Everybody's Here", on their official Myspace site, with a message revealing details of free exclusive download from 17 March onwards. Lead singer David Tan said that the song was written for youths or anybody who feels lost, desolated, low in self-esteem, in despair, and all the negative things people face. "Everybody's Here" was released on 987FM for the week 17 March 2008.

On 13 May 2008, The Straits Times reported a press release by Electrico that Sassoon, the lead guitarist, had left the band on 7 April. The band said, "With his demanding and gruelling career in the legal sector, Sassoon had long wanted to take a break from the band to focus his energy on his legal profession". Electrico decided against a replacement guitarist. In a later interview, Sassoon revealed he left the band due to different visions and formed a new band, In Each Hand A Cutlass.

On 27 May 2008, The Straits Times announced that Electrico won 2 awards at the 13th annual COMPASS awards ceremony. They were awarded their third Top Local English Pop Song, for "Runaway", while frontman David Tan was awarded the COMPASS Young Composer of the Year.

Electrico was nominated for two categories in the 3rd Power 98 Singapore Music Awards: Best Singapore Band and Best Local Song for "Everybody's Here".

Electrico's third album, We Satellites, was released in Singapore on 8 July 2008. This album was less successful compared to their previous material. The lead single to be released from the brand new album was "Save Our Souls".

On 10 June 2008, The New Paper announced that frontman David Tan had been awarded the Martell VSOP Rising Personalities Award.

On 8 June 2009, The Straits Times reported that keyboardist Amanda Ling left the band in May, and that she had engaged a lawyer to review the band's accounts.

Electrico wrote the theme song "What Do You See?", for the Singapore National Day parade, held on 9 August 2009 at The Float @ Marina Bay to commemorate Singapore's 44th year of independence, and performed the song at the event. The lyrics were cited by Prime Minister Lee Hsien Loong in his 2018 National Day Message.

The band travelled to Perth, Australia, to perform at the One Movement For Music Perth in October 2009.

After a two-year hiatus, Electrico returned to play the Baybeats festival at Esplanade – Theatres on the Bay in June 2013. It was also reported that the band was working on new music. The band also played at Music Matters Live.

In 2014, the band shared demo recordings of their new songs online. The songs, including "Eyes Wide Open", featured a more electronic vibe. Electrico's set at the Good Vibes Festival in Sepang, Malaysia in August was cancelled after severe weather, and the band organised a "pay-what-you-want" fundraising gig at The Substation in October instead. Reviewing the gig positively in Today, Kevin Mathews wrote that "the crowd was well into the performance — their enthusiasm certainly inspiring the band to give their best, despite some evidence of rustiness".

== Peaks, awards, accomplishments and accolades ==
=== 2004 ===
- Debut single "I Want You" which was taken from their 2004 debut album So Much More Inside shot to No.1 on the then Singapore radio station Perfect 10 (now known as 987FM)'s official Top20 weekly countdown chart, giving Electrico their first No.1 hit
- "I Want You" peaked No.1 position on the then Perfect 10 Top20 weekly countdown during the week of 23–30 October 2004
- "I Want You"'s overall chart position on the then Perfect 10 Top100 of 2004 was a good No.14

=== 2005 ===
- MTV Asia Awards Favourite Artist Singapore (Nominated), making history by being the first Singapore band to be nominated at the regional music TV channel's awards
- "Runaway" peaked at No.7 on the then Perfect 10 Top20 weekly countdown during the weeks of 7–14 and 14–21 January 2005
- "Good Time" peaked at No.17 on the then Perfect 10 Top20 weekly countdown during the week of 22–29 April 2005
- Won street culture magazine I.S.'s Readers Choice Award for Best Local Band
- Electrico opened for The Bravery when the latter staged its first concert in Singapore

=== 2006 ===
- Won their first COMPASS award, for Top Local English Pop Song, at the 11th COMPASS awards ceremony for "I Want You"
- Won the street culture magazine I.S.'s Readers Choice Award for Best Local Band (for the second consecutive year)
- "Love in New Wave", the first single off their 2nd album Hip City, went to give Electrico their second No.1 hit on Singapore radio station 987FM's official Top10 weekly chart show
- "Love in New Wave" peaks at No.1 on 987FM's Top10 weekly countdown during the week of 22–29 September 2006
- Won two 2 awards in the first Power98 Singapore Music Awards as voted by the public, in the categories for Favourite Singapore Band and Favourite Local Song for "All The World"
- Two remixes of "Love in New Wave" were recorded by Singapore DJs, one by Aldrin Quek and a second by Akien & Tim Hudson, and were added to the track list of the repackaged edition of Hip City as bonus tracks
- "Love in New Wave" places at No. 32 for 987FM's year end Top100 Countdown of 2006
- Won the Local Act of the Year (2006) accolade in 987FM's Top100 Special Category Nomination
- "Love in New Wave" chart results for 2006 places it at an average of No. 16 on Power98's Top30 of 2006

=== 2007 ===
- Staged their maiden concert titled Love in New Wave which took place on 2 March 2007 at National University of Singapore's UCC Concert Hall
- "Hello" peaked at No.8 on the 987FM Top20 Weekly Countdown during the week of 16–23 March 2007
- Won Most Popular Band at the Motorola Super Stylemix Awards
- "Good Time" wins the band their second COMPASS Top Local English Pop Song award, at the 12th COMPASS awards
- "Love in New Wave" nominated for Best Local Song at the 2nd Power98 Singapore Music Awards
- Won Best Singapore Band at the 2nd Power98 Singapore Music Awards
- "Love in New Wave" reached No.1 for the week of 30 August 2007, on Nu107Fm, a radio station from The Philippines
- Received three nominations for 987FM's awards: Top100 Special Category, Local Act of the Year, and Local Song of the Year for "Hello"
- "Hello"'s overall chart position on 987FM's Top100 Countdown of 2007 was an average No.55

=== 2008 ===
- Won their third COMPASS award in the Top Local English Pop Song category, at the 13th COMPASS awards ceremony for "Runaway"
- Frontman David Tan was awarded the COMPASS oung Composer of the Yearat the 13th COMPASS awards ceremony
- Nominated for Best Singapore Band at the 3rd Power98 Singapore Music Awards
- Nominated for Best Local Song at the 3rd Power98 Singapore Music Awards for "Everybody's Here"
- David Tan was awarded the Martell VSOP's Rising Personalities Award
- Nominated for MTV Asia Awards' Favourite Artist Singapore

== Discography ==
- So Much More Inside – released by Universal Music Singapore (August 2004), Australia (September 2004), Thailand (January 2005), Indonesia (March 2005)
- Hip City – released by Universal Music Singapore (June 2006), Universal Music Malaysia (December 2006)
- We Satellites – Warner Music Singapore (July 2008), Warner Music Malaysia (August 2008)

== Singles ==
| Year | Title | Singapore 987FM Top Position | Singapore Power 98 Top Position | Album |
|---|---|---|---|---|
| 2004 | "I Want You" | 1 | — | So Much More Inside |
| 2005 | "Runaway" | 7 | — | So Much More Inside |
| 2005 | "Good Time" | 17 | — | So Much More Inside |
| 2006 | "Love in New Wave" | 1 | — | Hip City |
| 2007 | "Hello" | 8 | — | Hip City |
| 2007 | "All The World" (Feat. Rivermaya) | — | — | Hip City |
| 2007 | "We're Not Made in the USA" | — | — | Hip City |
| 2008 | "Everybody's Here" | — | — | (Single) |
| 2008 | "Save Our Souls" | — | — | We Satellites |
| 2008 | "Hail to the Friends" | — | — | We Satellites |
| 2009 | "Faces" | — | — | We Satellites |
| 2009 | "Californication" | — | — | (On National Day 2009 Track List) |
