= Corrinne May =

Singaporean musician (born 1973)

- 符美云
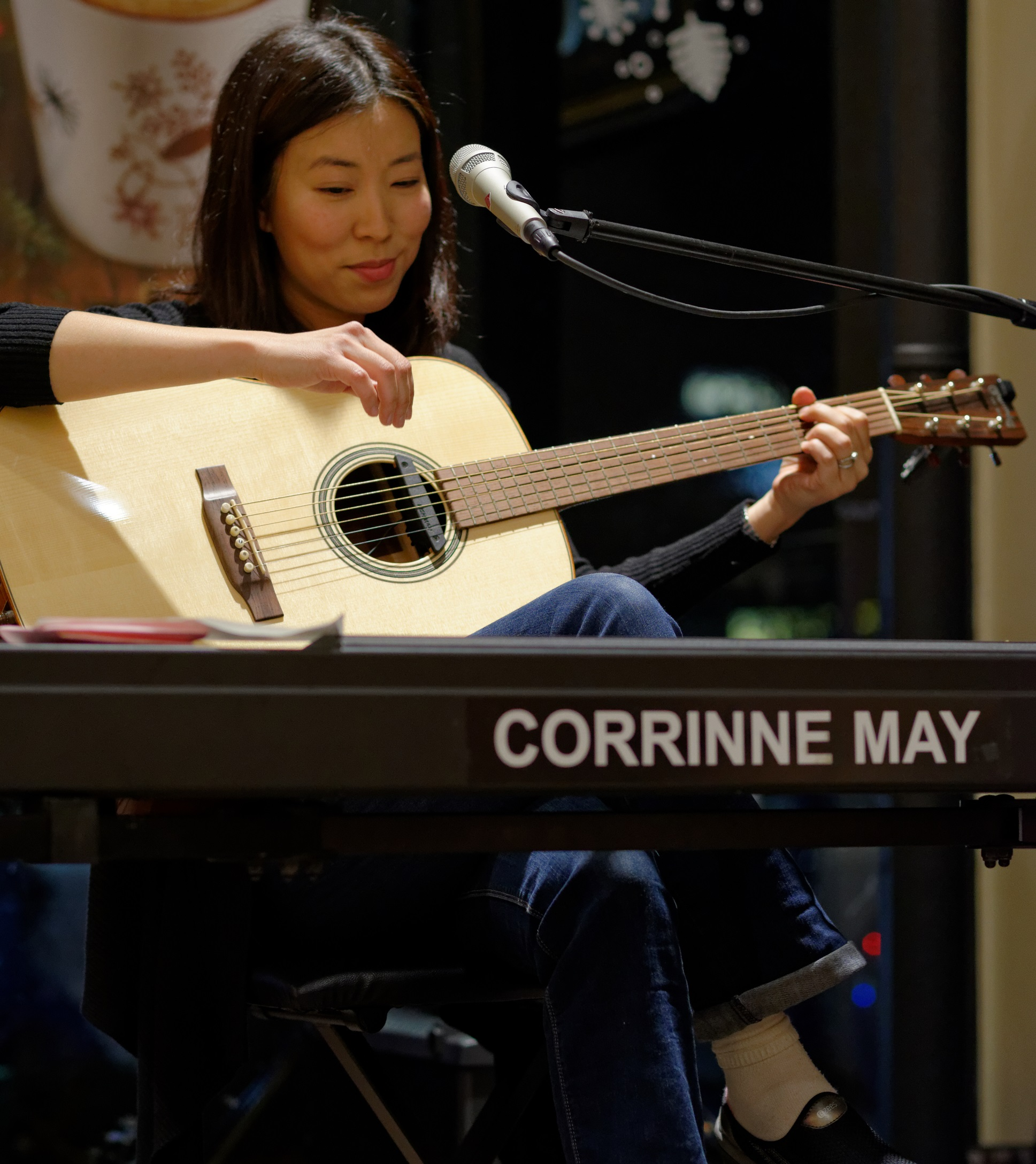
- May at Peets Coffee Tarzana in 2014
- Born: 19 January 1973 (age 53); Singapore
- Citizenship: Singaporean
- Education: Raffles Junior College; National University of Singapore; Berklee College of Music
- Occupations: Singer, musician, songwriter, record producer
- Spouse: Kavin Hoo (m. 2003)
- Children: Claire Hoo (daughter)
- Musical career
- Instruments: Vocals, piano, acoustic guitar
- Years active: 2001–present
- Labels: Pink Armchair Records (US); Warner Music (Singapore); S2S Pte. Ltd. (Japan)
- Website: corrinnemay.com

Corrinne May (born Corrinne Foo May Ying; 19 January 1973) is a Singaporean musician, singer, and songwriter.

== Life and career ==
She graduated from the Berklee College of Music in Boston, and began her career as a singer-songwriter in Los Angeles. Her debut album Fly Away, which included a song with Carole King and Carole Bayer Sager titled "If You Didn't Love Me", was released in 2001.

She married Kavin Hoo in 2003, whom she first met in late 1996. they have one daughter, Claire. To date, she has released five albums, the latest being Crooked Lines in 2012.

In March 2012, May released her album Crooked Lines, whose inspiration was based on May's experience with raising her daughter Claire during her four-year career hiatus. The song from the album, "Beautiful Life", earned an accolade in 2014 for top local English pop song at the 19th Annual Composers and Authors Society of Singapore (Compass) Awards. Another song from the album, "When I Close My Eyes", was inspired by Claire's favorite children's book of the same name. May recorded an acoustic version of "Just What I Was Looking For" on video. Other tracks of the album are "In My Arms", "Lazarus", "24 Hours", "You Believed", "Pinocchio", "Because of Love", "Your Song", "Sight of Love", and "If You Ask".

Corrinne also participated in an album named 'Celebrate Breath', the twentieth in a series of Celebrate albums from Craig 'n Co., produced by Kavin Hoo and Todd Herzog.

In December 2018, she released two music videos of her renditions of "Silent Night" and "Be Thou My Vision", in colllaboration with Singapore based production company PixelMusica.

== Discography ==
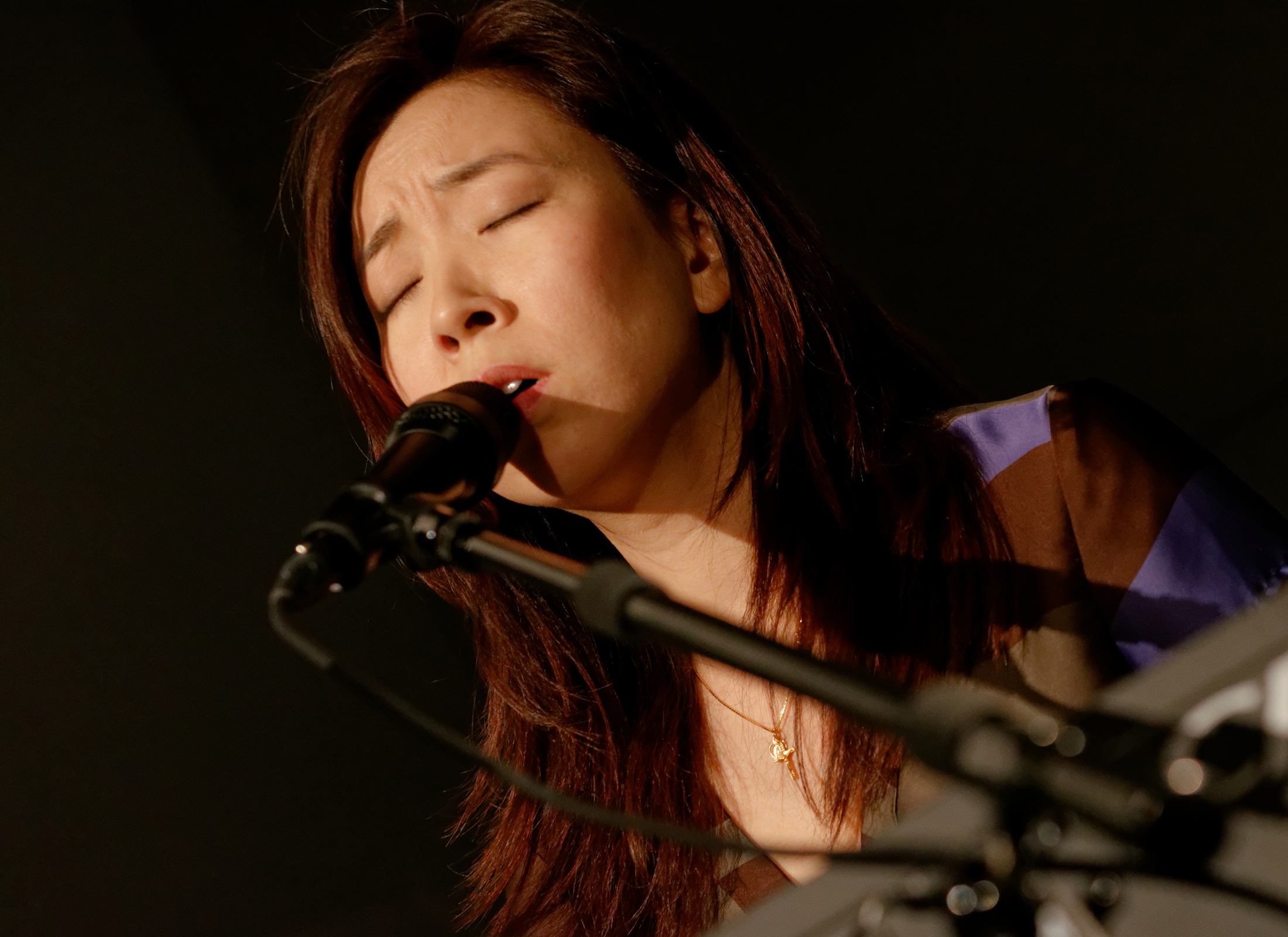
Corrinne May performing live at the Lewitt Lounge. Day 2 (24 January 2014) of the Winter NAMM Show in Anaheim California.

- Fly Away (2001)
- Safe in a Crazy World (2005)
- The Gift (2006)
- Beautiful Seed (2007)
- Crooked Lines (2012)

== Awards ==
Year	Award
2001	New Folk Award, Kerrville Folk Festival
2003	Best Contemporary Album, Just Plain Folks Music Awards
2007	COMPASS Young Composer of the Year (Singapore)
2007	COMPASS Wings of Excellence (Singapore)
2007	NUS Young Alumni Award (Singapore)
