= Sylvia Ratonel =

Singaporean singer (born 1988)

- Born: Sylvia Anne Ratonel; 14 June 1988 (age 38)
- Origin: Singapore
- Genres: Pop, R&B, jazz, dance
- Occupations: Singer, artiste, spokesmodel
- Instruments: Vocals
- Years active: 2009–present
- Label: Universal
- Website: www.facebook.com/pages/Sylvia-Ratonel/151030292233

Sylvia Anne Ratonel (born 14 June 1988) is a Singaporean singer and spokesmodel. She is most popularly known as the first female finalist in Singapore Idol history as well as being the runner-up of the third season. The show launched her career in music and entertainment; in January 2010, less than a month after the competition, she signed a full-time contract with national broadcaster MediaCorp, and sealed a recording deal with Universal Music Singapore in March of the same year Ratonel also became the first Singaporean celebrity ambassador for cosmetic brand Maybelline New York. In 2010, Ratonel was ranked as part of the Top 100 Sexiest Women in the World by FHM Magazine. She also won the Breakout Star of the Year ELLE Awards 2010.

Her eponymous debut album, Sylvia Ratonel was released on 27 October 2010, making her the third female Singapore Idol alum after Maia Lee and Olinda Cho to release an album. Four singles were released from the album, three of which became Top 10 hits on Singapore radio charts. Her post-competition career has made Ratonel the most successful female singer to emerge from Singapore Idol.

== Biography ==
=== 1988–2009: Early life ===
Ratonel comes from a family of five, and has two brothers Bryan and Timothy. Her family faced financial struggles in her early years. When she was 10, the family moved into a small flat with only a living room and no bedroom. Ratonel later said in an interview that they "grew up sleeping together in one room, on mattresses". Life was not easy for her family. At times, they had to depend on church rations and would go to church every Sunday to receive food. Ratonel and her family now live in a two-bedroom HDB flat. She is of Filipino descent.

Ratonel attended Fengshan Primary School, and graduated to Bedok View Secondary School, where she transferred from the Normal (Academic) stream to the Express stream. She opted for a polytechnic education at Temasek Polytechnic with the intention to start working earlier. Ratonel eventually graduated with a diploma in Hospitality and Tourism Management. She worked part-time to supplement the family income during her time in Temasek Polytechnic. After graduating, she deferred her plans to pursue a degree to avoid burdening her parents. Instead, she went to work at the Conrad Centennial Hotel as a secretary.

Growing up, Ratonel considered herself shy and timid and did not participate in school performances. Her family enforced a strict upbringing, such as the rule to return home everyday before 8:00 pm. At the age of 18, Ratonel left home in what was a rebellious phase, and began visiting clubs and drinking alcohol. She has since mended her relationship with her family and refers to herself as "a good girl who likes bad boys". Under the persuasion and encouragement of her family, Ratonel decided to audition for Singapore Idol in 2009 albeit having no professional vocal coaching prior to the competition.

=== 2009: Singapore Idol ===
On 6 June 2009, Ratonel participated in the auditions for the third season of Singapore Idol, held at The Cathay cineplex. Her audition impressed judge Ken Lim, who asserted that she had the potential to make it into the Top 10. Ratonel passed the callbacks and theatre auditions, with the judges' opinions divided on the amount of talent and potential that she possessed. However, at the Piano Show round in September, she managed impressed the judges with her rendition of Duffy's "Mercy".

For several rounds, Ratonel alternated between being one of the strongest and weakest contestants, landing in the bottom two on two occasions. However, beginning with the Top 6 round, her support from the viewers had gained even momentum for her to advance through each round for five consecutive weeks, safely avoiding the elimination group in every round. After competing in the last semi-final round on 8 December, Ratonel became the first female finalist on Singapore Idol. On 27 December 2009, she competed against Sezairi Sezali for the title of Singapore Idol, and finished the competition as the runner-up. Despite being disappointed, Ratonel has expressed happiness of being able to reach the finals, saying "my Idol journey has been wonderful. I would never change anything about it. It's been a really long and tiring journey, but it's so fulfilling.... I'm really glad that I managed to touch many people's hearts, and their lives. I hope to continue doing that,"

In a post-Idol televised interview with both Ken Lim and Ratonel present, Lim answered that he "didn't think that [Ratonel] did well" when asked about his opinions regarding the results, and compared her performances in the finals as weaker than those she had in the semi-final rounds.

Performances:
Week #	Theme	Song choice	Original artist	Order #	Result
Top 13	Chart Toppers	"Fallin'"	Alicia Keys	4	Safe
Top 12	The Year I Was Born	"Sweet Child O' Mine"	Guns N' Roses	5	Safe
Top 11	An Asian Feast	"Sinaran"	Sheila Majid	1	Bottom 4
Top 10	A Tribute to Michael Jackson	"The Way You Make Me Feel"	Michael Jackson	4	Safe
Top 9	For Someone Special	"When You Believe"	Mariah Carey & Whitney Houston	2	Safe
Top 8	Mambo Mania	"I Wanna Dance With Somebody (Who Loves Me)"	Whitney Houston	5	Bottom 2
Top 7	My Folks Love This	"Warwick Avenue"	Duffy	2	Bottom 2
Top 6	Killing Me Softly (With This Song)	"Will You Love Me Tomorrow"	The Shirelles	4	Safe
Top 5	You Asked For It	"Cry"	Mandy Moore	3	Safe
Top 4 (Week 1)^{A}	A Song for a Cause	"I'll Be Here" "Make You Feel My Love"	Written by Sylvia Ratonel; Bob Dylan	4; 4	Safe
Top 4 (Week 2)	Step Up & Dance!	"I Don't Need A Man" "American Boy"	Pussycat Dolls; Estelle	3; 3	Safe
Top 3	Judges' Choice	"Angel" "Held"	Sarah McLachlan; Natalie Grant	2; 2	Safe
Top 2	Free Choice; Free Choice; Coronation Song	"Mercy" "Yellow" "Touched by an Angel"	Duffy; Coldplay; Written by Ken Lim	1; 1; 1	Runner-up

- ^ Note A: The episode was later revealed to be a non-elimination round, explaining a repeat of the Top 4 the following week.

=== 2009–11: Post-Idol career and debut album ===
Ratonel's first public performance after Singapore Idol was at the Celebrate 2010 Countdown Party at Marina Bay. She performed "Empire State of Mind" together with the rest of the Singapore Idol Top 13.

In January 2010, less than a month after Singapore Idol, Ratonel was signed on a full-time contract with national broadcast station MediaCorp. She was also engaged to promote the launch of the new Motorola Dext social-networking phone. On 23 and 24 January, she appeared in promotional events at the Iluma cineplex in Singapore. Later in March, she signed a record deal with Universal Music Singapore. Her pan- Asian look caught the eye of make-up brand Maybelline and in that same month, she also became the new face of Maybelline New York, the first Singaporean celebrity ambassador for the popular cosmetics brand.

Prior to the end of Singapore Idol, Ratonel and Sezairi Sezali had already agreed to have each other as featured artists on their debut album regardless of who won the competition. When Sezairi's debut album, Take Two was released in mid-2010, the track list was revealed to indeed contain a duet, titled "A Woman and a Man", with Ratonel as a featured artist.

Ratonel appeared as a guest star in the MediaCorp telemovie Seven Days. In the movie she performed the duet "You and I" with Rai from the Singaporean pop duo Jack & Rai. In June, Ratonel made her debut as co-host alongside Michelle Chia in the MediaCorp weekly food variety show "Buffetlicious" on MediaCorp Channel 5.

On the 45th National Day Parade of Singapore, she covered Stefanie Sun's "One United People" and later lip-synced to a dance version of the parade's theme song, "Song For Singapore" alongside Sezairi Sezali. She was honoured to perform the National Anthem of Singapore before the start of the Singapore F1 Grand Prix race on 26 September 2010.

In the same month, Ratonel made it to the list of Top 100 Sexiest Women in the World in FHM. She appeared on the cover of Cleo in March and November 2010. She also appeared on the cover for Seventeen in June. Ratonel won the Breakout Star of the Year ELLE Awards 2010 in December. Later that month, Ratonel recorded a duet of "Come Home to 5" with Sezali, a promotional theme song for Channel 5 which has been airing since 24 December 2010.

On 27 October 2010, Ratonel released her eponymous debut album, Sylvia Ratonel. The album received mixed reviews from online critics and has yet to receive a sales certification. Four singles were released; "Fly", "It's Raining", "Mari Bersamaku" and "Loving You". With the exception of "Mari Bersamaku", every single has reached the Top 10 of the 987FM Top 20 Chart, with her highest-charting single, "It's Raining", peaking at No. 3. Ratonel released a music video for "It's Raining" to negative reviews. To further promote the album, Ratonel held an album launch party at The Boiler Room at St James Power Station in November 2010.

=== 2011: Aladdin ===
According to her Twitter page, Ratonel has been involved in two charity events set to take place in July and August 2011. She also announced on Twitter in June that her audition for a role in a musical has been successful. The musical was later revealed to be a Singaporean adaptation of Aladdin, with Ratonel playing the female lead role of Jasmine. The show ran from 24 November to 17 December 2011.

Ratonel once again received national honour by being selected to record the theme song, "In A Heartbeat", for the 2011 National Day Parade of Singapore. This made Ratonel the first female alum (and third overall) from Singapore Idol to record an original national theme song, and the first non-winner to do so. A music video was filmed for the song and released on 4 July 2011, but Ratonel does not appear in it as a result of negative reception from her previous video, "It's Raining".

== Discography ==
=== Albums ===
List of albums, with selected chart positions and certifications
Title	Details	Peak chart positions				Sales certifications
Title	Details	SG	BN	ID	MY	Sales certifications
Sylvia Ratonel	Released: 27 October 2010; Label: Universal; Formats: CD, Digital download	—	—	—	—	SG: None; BN: None; ID: None; MY: None
"—" denotes albums that did not chart or were not released

=== Singles ===
List of singles, with selected chart positions, showing year released, format and album name
Single	Year	Peak chart positions		Album	Format
Single	Year	987FM	RIA	Album	Format
"Fly"	2010	6	–	Sylvia Ratonel	Radio
"It's Raining"	2010	3	–	Sylvia Ratonel	Radio
"Mari Bersamaku"	2010	–	11	Sylvia Ratonel	Radio
"Loving You"	2011	8	—	Sylvia Ratonel	Radio
"—" denotes a title that did not chart, or was not released for that radio station.

=== Other songs ===
The following songs are not (official or promotional) singles and have not appeared on an album by Sylvia Ratonel.

Year	Song	Album
2010	"A Woman and a Man" (Sezairi Sezali featuring Sylvia Ratonel)	Take Two
2010	"Come Home To Five" (Sezairi Sezali & Sylvia Ratonel)	Non-album song
2011	"In A Heartbeat"	Non-album song

=== Music videos ===
List of Ratonel's music videos, showing year released and director
Year	Title	Director(s)
2010	"It's Raining"	Unknown
2010	"Come Home To 5"	Unknown

== Awards and nominations ==
Year	Ceremony	Category	Result
2010	ELLE Awards	Breakout Star of the Year	Won
