= National Day (Singapore) =

Public holiday in Singapore

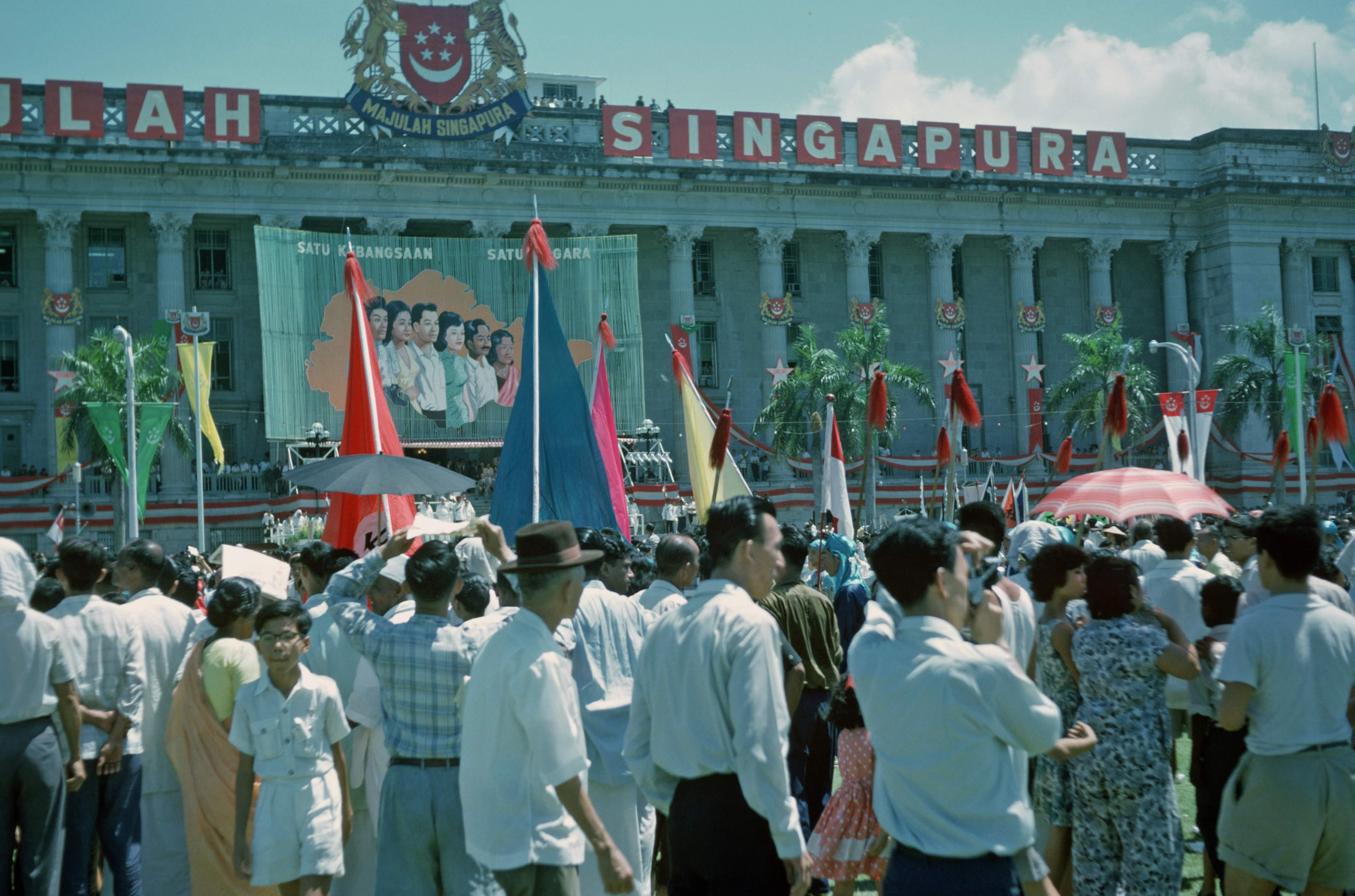
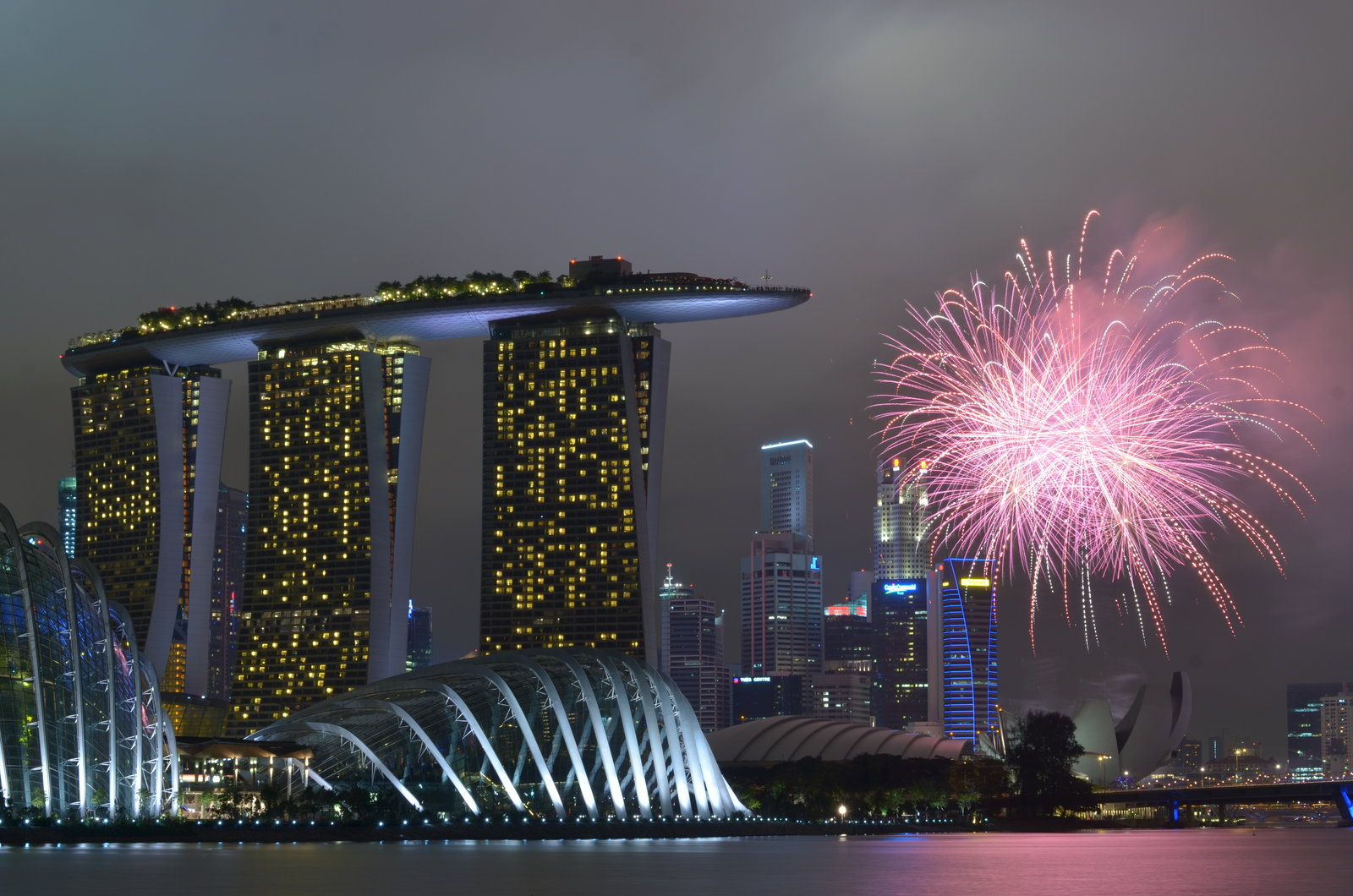
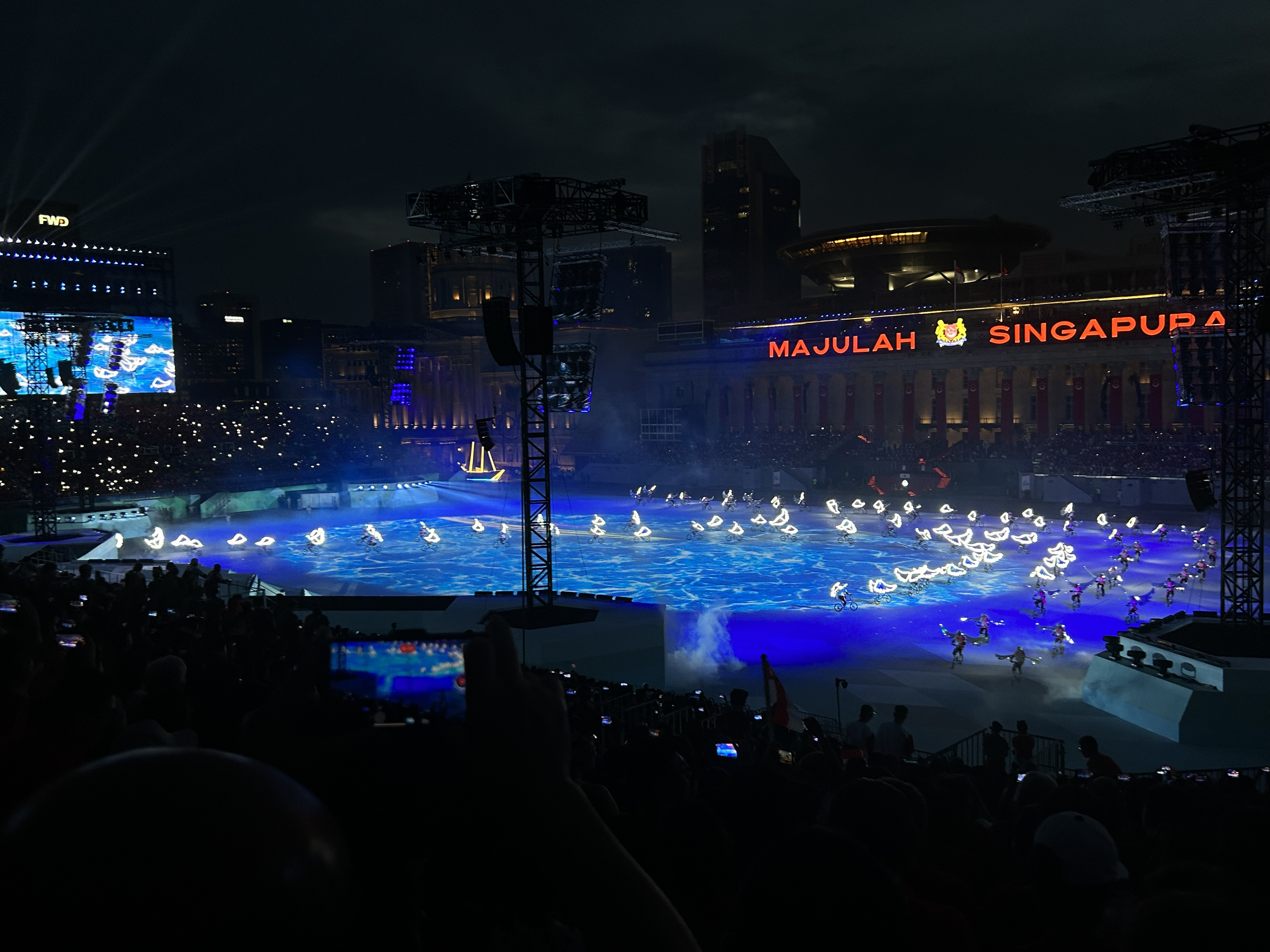
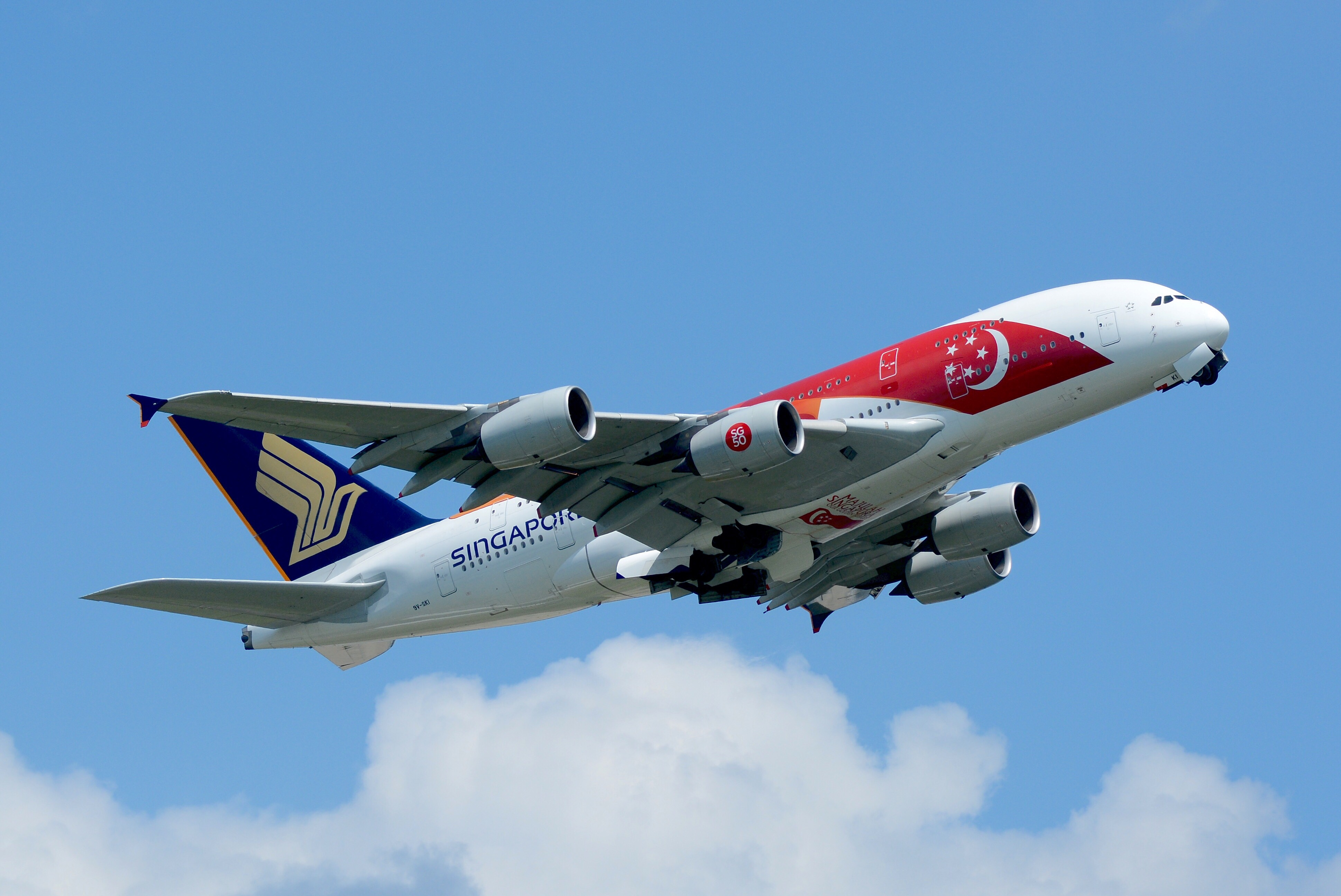
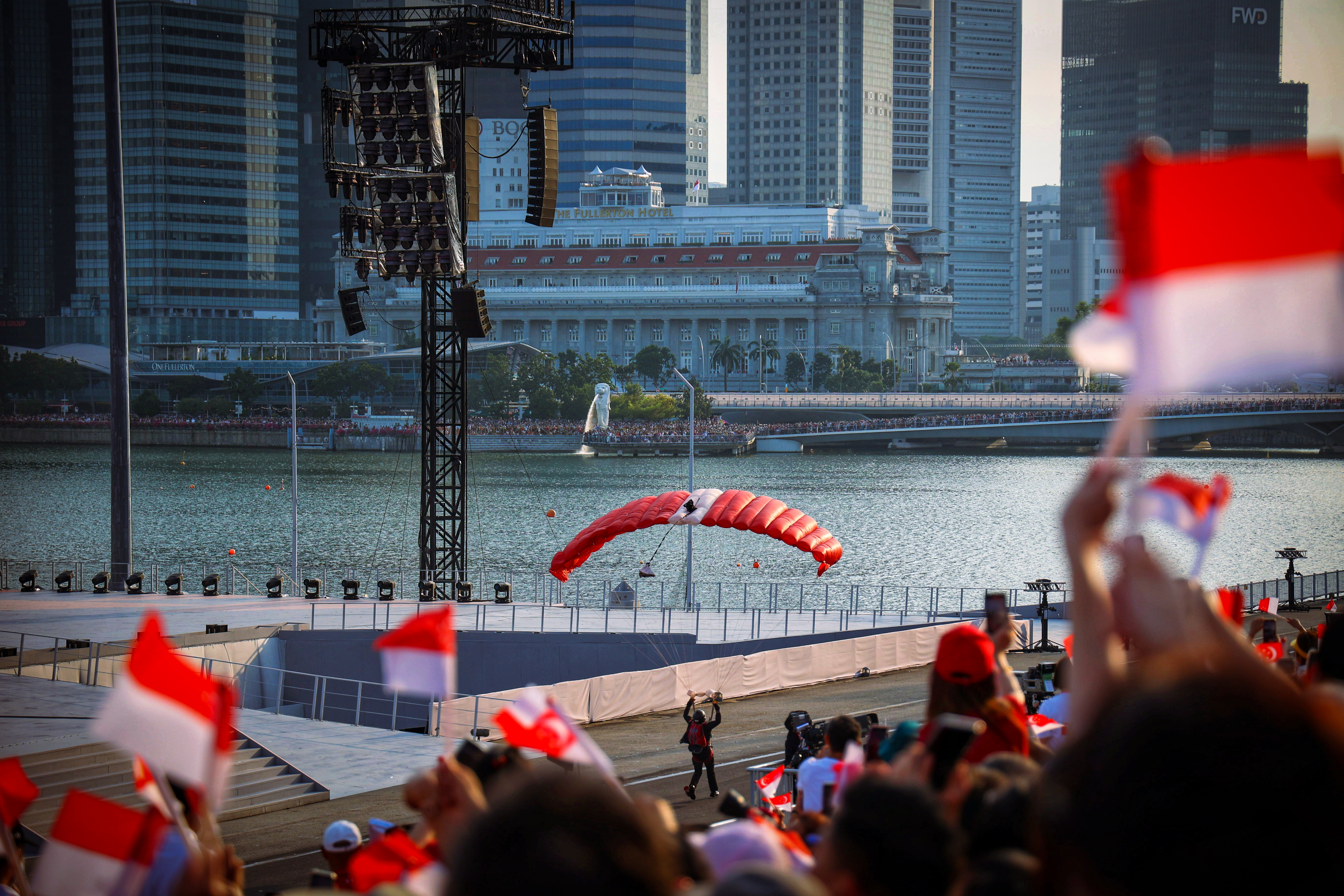
- From top, left to right: Various commemorations of National Day over the decades
- Official name: National Day of Singapore
- Also called: Singapore Independence Day, Singapore Day
- Observed by: Singapore
- Type: National
- Significance: to celebrate Singapore's independence as a sovereign state
- Celebrations: National Day Parade, National Day Message by the Prime Minister of Singapore, and fireworks celebrations
- Date: 3 June (1959–1964); 9 August (1965–present)
- Frequency: Annually

National Day, (Note: Malay: Hari Kebangsaan Singapura; Chinese: 新加坡国庆日; Tamil: சிங்கப்பூரின் தேசிய நாள்) sometimes known internationally as Singapore Independence Day, (Note: Malay: Hari Kemerdekaan Singapura; Chinese: 新加坡独立日; Tamil: சிங்கப்பூர் சுதந்திர தினம்) and formally as Singapore Day, is a statutory public holiday in Singapore held annually on 9 August. It commemorates the anniversary of the Proclamation of Singapore, when the State of Singapore seceded from Malaysia as an independent and sovereign nation.

The holiday is considered a focal point for national identity and unity among Singaporeans, and is celebrated through various public festivities; the prime minister presents an annual message to the country, and delivers a longer address at the National Day Rally on the first or second Sunday afterward. The focal point of celebrations is the annual National Day Parade (NDP).

== History ==
From 1960, National Day was originally observed on 3 June to signify the anniversary of Singapore's attainment of sovereignty from the United Kingdom as a self-governing colony. After Singapore separated from Malaysia, National Day was moved to 9 August in 1966 to mark the anniversary of its independence.

== Festivities ==
=== National Day Parade ===
The National Day Parade (NDP) is a large-scale parade that serves as the focal point of festivities; traditionally, the parade features contingents of the Ministry of Home Affairs (also including, dependent on the venue, flypasts and processions of military vehicles), uniformed groups and other community groups, as well as cultural presentations and a fireworks display.

=== National Day Message ===
The National Day Message is an annual tradition on 9 August since 1966. In each year's recorded message, the Prime Minister of Singapore "examine[s] domestic and global developments, review[s] economic performance and outlook, and outline[s] national priorities and government plans as [he inspires] Singaporeans to move forward with a unified sense of purpose".

=== National Day rally ===
On the first or second Sunday following National Day, the prime minister gives an address to the nation at a National Day Rally, which usually features discussions of the country's status and accomplishments, and announcements of future plans and policy changes.

== See also ==
- List of Singaporean patriotic songs
