= Fann Wong filmography =

This article contains a list of screen appearances by the Singaporean actress Fann Wong.

== Film ==
Year	English title	Native title	Role	Notes	Ref.
1989	Thunder Cops II	贼公差婆	Zhang Hua	Cameo	
1999	The Truth About Jane and Sam	真心话	Jane	2000 Hong Kong Film Awards, Best Newcomer nomination	
2000	When I Fall in Love... with Both	月亮的秘密	Joy		
2003	Shanghai Knights	—N/a	Chon Lin	2003 MTV Movie Awards, Best Fight nomination	
2005	Dragon Eye Congee: A Dream of Love	龙眼粥	He Xinyue / Zhang Yin		
2006	Zodiac, The Race Begins	—N/a	Snake / Cat	Voice	
2007	Just Follow Law	我在政府部门的日子	Tanya Chew		
2008	Ah Long Pte Ltd	老师嫁老大	Wang Lihua		
2008	Dance of the Dragon	龙之舞	Emi	2008 West Hollywood International Film Festival, Best Actress	
2009	The Wedding Game	大喜事	Vicky Xie	2009 1st international comedy film festival, The Best Feature Film	
2010	Happy Go Lucky	福星到	Fu Xin		
2010	In a tangle	一不留神	Mili		
2011	Cornflower Blue	蓝色矢车菊	Sangyun		
2012	Whoever	爱谁谁	Han Wanting	Cameo	
2013	Runaway Woman	暴走吧，女人	Se-la		
2014	When a Peking Family Meets Aupair	洋妞到我家	Mengmeng	Cameo	
2015	The Right Mistake	将错就错		Cameo	
2016	Packages from Daddy	心靈時鐘	Mom (Fang Hui-ying)		
2018	If Thoughts Can Kill	一念			
2019	Make It Big Big	玉建煌崇大事件		Cameo	
2019	When Ghost Meets Zombie	女鬼爱上尸	Zhen Zhen's Mother	Cameo	

== Telemovies ==
Year	English title	Native title	Role	Notes	Ref.
1995	Fatal Memory	血案迷情	Lin An-ni		
1995	Somewhere in Time	再世情缘	Shen Ying		
1997	The Matchmaker's Match	四点金	Xiang-gu		
1997	The Accidental Hero	流氓英雄	Zhao Li		
2005	House of Harmony	融之堂	Mei Ling	2-part telemovie series	
2006	The Legend of Lu Xiaofeng	陆小凤传奇	Sha-man		
2007	Cheerful Get-Together in Beijing	十全十美之相聚北京	Liu Huan	4-part telemovie series	
2012	N/A	旱地忽律朱贵	Furong	HD telemovie	
2013	Love Shake	心动	Sharon		

== Television series ==
Year	English title	Native title	Role	Notes	Ref.
1994	Dreams Come True	美梦成真	Li Lin		
1994	The Challenger	勇者无惧	Dong Shaoqi		
1995	Chronicle of Life	缘尽今生	Fang Ling		
1995	Morning Express	阳光列车	Ye Xinping		
1995	Sparks of Life	生命火花	Ma Jiajia		
1995	The Golden Pillow	金枕头	Li Mingzhu		
1996	The Unbroken Cycle	解连环	Ye Qin / Li Xiangmei / Zhu Zhiyue		
1996	A Romance in Shanghai	新上海假期	Jian Ni		
1996	Wild Orchids	再见萤光兰	Liu Ying		
1996	Brave New World	新阿郎/一路风尘	Lin Xiaoyun		
1998	The Return of the Condor Heroes	神雕侠侣	Xiao Long-nv		
1998	Myths & Legends of Singapore: Lady of the Hill	石叻坡传说之红山林姑娘	Hongshan Lin Gu-niang		
1999	Out to Win	步步为赢	Coco Zhang		
2000	The Legendary Swordsman	笑傲江湖	Ren Yingying		
2000	Looking For Stars	星锁	Orange		
2001	Heroes in Black	我来也	Liu Feiyan		
2001	Self Destruction	自体毁灭	Minmin / Marlene		
2001	Madam White Snake	青蛇与白蛇/白蛇新传	Bai Shejing / Bai Suzhen / Qin Xiaoxiao / Xishi		
2001	The Hotel	大酒店	Xiao Fang / Rose		
2002	Brotherhood	有情有义	Li Ting		
2003	Moon Fairy	奔月	Chang'er		
2003	Always on My Mind	无炎的爱	Guan Sijia		
2005	My Fair Lady	我爱钟无艳	Zhong Wuyan		
2005	Beautiful Illusions	镜中人	Wang Yixin / Joanne		
2005	The Lucky Stars	福禄寿三星报喜	Ma Ruyi		
2006	Magical Hands	猜心妙手	Princess Zhaoyang		
2006	Women of Times	至尊红颜	Wang Xiyi		
2007	Making Miracles	奇迹	Liu Shuyan		
2007	Switched!	幸运星	Jiang Xinyu		
2007	The Fairies of Liaozhai	聊斋奇女子之连城	Lian Cheng		
2008	The Defining Moment	沸腾冰点	Lin Kexin		
2009	The Ultimatum	双子星	Fang Songqiao		
2009	The Last Night of Madam Chin	金大班的最后一夜	Ren Daidai		
2010	Gu Su Shi'er Niang	姑苏十二娘	"Cha Niang" Zixin		
2011	Be Happy	生日快乐	Xiao Kaixin (Da S)		
2011	On the Fringe	边缘父子	Liu Jiali		
2012	The Legend Of Crazy Monk 3	活佛济公3	Xuerou		
2012	Tun Shu Xi Jiang	屯戍西疆	Lu Wanzhi		
2014	Song in the Clouds	云中歌	Wulei	Cameo	
2015	My Secret App	我的宝贝机密	Lu Yunfei	StarHub Go Local production	
2015	Love Yunge from the Desert	大汉情缘之云中歌	Wu Lei		
2016	Destiny Of Love	亲爱的！好久不见	Zhou Zixuan	Cameo	
2016	Rock Records in Love	滚石爱情故事	Wu Jiamei		
2018	Doppelganger	入侵者	Wang Siting		
2019	Walk With Me	谢谢你出现在我的行程里	Wu Xiuyu		
2019	All is Well - Singapore	你那边怎样.我这边OK	Linda		
2019	Dive	扑通扑通的青春		Cameo	
TBA	Breeze by the Sea	不如海边吹吹风		Taiwanese production	

== Variety and reality show ==
Year	English title	Native title	Role	Notes	Ref.
1998	Fann Wong's Music Love Story	范文芳的音乐爱情故事	Herself	Autobiographical series	
2001	At Home With... Fann Wong	名人专访: 范文芳	Interviewee		
2001	Travel Hunt: Japan	奇趣搜搜搜	Host		
2002	Fann Adventure: Malaysia and South Africa	非范之想	Host		
2005	Closet Affairs	In女皇	Host		
2006	Closet Affairs II	In女皇2	Host		
2006	Peschardt's People		Interviewee		
2009	Asia Fashion	亚洲时尚风	Host		
2009	The Wedding	芳心有李	Interviewee		
2011	Mission Possible	小村大任务	Host		
2012	Asian Ace		Judge		
2015	Go to Love	出发吧爱情	Herself		
2021	Crème De La Crème	糖朝冠冕	Host and judge		
2023	Crème De La Crème 2	糖朝冠冕2	Judge		
