= No Problem (Fann Wong album) =

Studio album by Fann Wong
- Released: October 3, 2000
- Genre: Mandarin pop
- Label: Hype Records (Singapore), EMI (Taiwan)

Fann Wong chronology
想你; Missing You (1999)	No Problem (2000)	愛上了你; In Love With You (2005)

No Problem (traditional Chinese: 沒有問題; simplified Chinese: 没有问题) is Fann Wong's fourth album release in Taiwan. It has ten tracks. The title track is influenced by Irish and Celtic bubblegum pop. The 8th track, a romantic ballad called "Stay", is the theme song for both When I Fall in Love...With Both and Looking For Stars.

Mickey Huang was the lyricist for the song "No Problem". While Wong filmed the music video for the song, she road a surfboard. For one music video in the album, Wong lay on a road that was 34 °C (93 °F). The album was produced by EMI Records. It was released on 3 October 2000 in Taiwan.

== Track listing ==
1. 沒有問題
2. 也許
3. 你的溫度
4. 好想
5. 發呆
6. 好習慣
7. 到底等什麼
8. Stay
9. 另一個城市
10. 最近

== Reception ==
A Today reviewer liked Wong's "pleasant vocals" but found that "the music keeps overpowering her paper-thin vocals throughout the album" and thought the album was "a predictable repeat of pleasant but boring radio friendly tracks". The Straits Times said No Problem features "catchy ditties which showcase her girlie pipes to devastating effect".

Lanzhou Morning Post stated the lead song, "No Problem", has a "delicate and light arrangement". According to Chengdu Evening News, No Problem has a "light and lively melody" and said Wong has a "sweet vocal delivery".
