= Shopping (Fann Wong album) =

Guangjie

Studio album by Fann Wong
- Released: July 8, 1998
- Genre: Mandarin pop
- Label: Hype Records (Singapore), EMI (Taiwan)

Fann Wong chronology
一個人生活; I Live Alone (1997)	Guangjie (1998)	想你; Missing You (1999)

Shopping (逛街 Guang jie) is Fann Wong (Chinese: 范文芳)'s second album release in Taiwan. It was an immensely popular pop album with over half a million sold.

The Shopping video led Hong Kong director Derek Yee to cast Fann in his Hong Kong art film, The Truth About Jane and Sam.

== Track listing ==
1. Summer Rain
2. 逛街
3. 趁一切還來得及
4. 不怕
5. 孤單
6. 下午茶
7. 星期六
8. 跟随
9. 搬家
10. 預言（文芳／張宇合唱）
11. 示情
