= 49th Golden Bell Awards =

- Date: October 25, 2014
- Site: Sun Yat-sen Memorial Hall, Taipei, Taiwan
- Hosted by: Sam Tseng; Selina Jen
- Organized by: Bureau of Audiovisual and Music Industry Development

Television coverage
- Network: CTV
- Duration: 320 minutes (inclusive of ads)

The 49th Golden Bell Awards (Mandarin:第49屆金鐘獎) was held on October 25, 2014, at Sun Yat-sen Memorial Hall in Taipei, Taiwan. The ceremony was broadcast live by CTV. Sam Tseng and Selina Jen emceed the ceremony.

== Winners and nominees ==
Below is the list of winners and nominees for the main categories.

Best Television Series: Boys Can Fly (刺蝟男孩)	Best Miniseries or Television Film: The Free Man (自由人)
Best Variety Show: Super Night Club (超級夜總會)	Best Comprehensive Show: United Farmers' Dream (農夫與他的田)
Best Leading Actor in a Television Series: Christopher Lee — A Good Wife (親愛的，我愛上別人了)	Best Leading Actress in a Television Series: Chung Hsin-ling — Sun After the Rain (雨後驕陽)
Best Supporting Actor in a Television Series: Chen Bor-jeng — Sun After the Rain (雨後驕陽)	Best Supporting Actress in a Television Series: Hsieh Chiung-hsuan — Lonely River (客家劇場—在河左岸)
Best Leading Actor in a Miniseries or Television Film: Wang Jui — My Old Boy (公視人生劇展—只想比你多活一天)	Best Leading Actress in a Miniseries or Television Film: Ivy Yin — Almost Heaven (公視人生劇展— 回家的女人)
Best Supporting Actor in a Miniseries or Television Film: Hsi Hsiang — Cigarette Ends (菸蒂)	Best Supporting Actress in a Miniseries or Television Film: Jenny Wen — Dawn / Spring (曉之春)
Best Host for a Variety Show: Hsu Nai-lin and Sam Tseng — Genius Go Go Go (天才衝衝衝)	Best Host for a Comprehensive Show: Paul Lee — Bringing Up Parents (爸媽囧很大)
Special Contribution Award: Chang Ping-yu; Huang Li-ming	
