= I Live Alone =

I Live Alone may refer to:

- I Live Alone (TV series), a South Korean TV series
- I Live Alone (album), a 1997 album
