= The Price of Peace =

Singaporean television series

- Title card
- 和平的代价
- Genre: Period drama
- Written by: Ang Eng Tee; Chong Liang Sin; Guo Yude
- Directed by: Loo Yin Kam
- Starring: Rayson Tan; Xiang Yun; Chen Shucheng; Jacintha Abisheganaden; James Lye; Lina Ng; Christopher Lee; Ivy Lee; Carole Lin; Ryan Choo
- Opening theme: "The Price of Peace" (和平的代价) performed by Sebastian Tan (drama) and Christopher Lee (ending)
- Country of origin: Singapore
- Original language: Mandarin
- No. of episodes: 32

Production
- Producers: Kok Len Shoong; Au Yuk Sing
- Running time: 45 minutes per episode

Original release
- Network: TCS Eighth Frequency
- Release: 30 June – 19 August 1997

Related
- In Pursuit of Peace (2001); A War Diary (2001)

The Price of Peace (和平的代价) is a Singaporean period drama television series set in Japanese-occupied Singapore during World War II. It starred Rayson Tan, Xiang Yun, Chen Shucheng, Jacintha Abisheganaden, James Lye, Lina Ng, Christopher Lee, Ivy Lee, Carole Lin and Ryan Choo. The series is based on a 1995 book of the same title published by Asiapac Books which contains numerous first-hand accounts of war veterans and eyewitnesses.

The series was first aired on Television Corporation of Singapore's (TCS) Channel 8 on 30 June 1997. The drama has been rerun on MediaCorp Channel 8 several times since its premiere. The characters' dialogue was mostly dubbed by uncredited voice actors.

Starting 1 August 2020, it was made available for streaming on Netflix along with over 100 Singaporean films and television series. The series is also viewable via Mediacorp's official streaming website meWATCH only in Singapore, as well as on its MediaCorp's YouTube channel .

== Plot ==
=== Outline ===
The plot is divided into seven parts, each focusing on distinct themes and events.

#	Title	Episodes	Description
1	Unity in Adversity 风雨同舟	1–13	This part introduces Japanese aggression in China during the Second Sino-Japanese War and depicts the major relief efforts undertaken by the Chinese community in Singapore and Malaya under Tan Kah Kee's leadership. Some featured historical events include the workers' strike at the Dungun tin mine and the Burma Road recruitment drive.
2	Eve of the Storm - 1941 暴风前夕 - 一九四一年	13–18	This part depicts escalating tensions in Singapore prior to the Japanese invasion. Some featured historical events include the establishment of air raid precautions in Singapore.
3	Defending Singapore 保卫新加坡	18–23	This part depicts the Japanese invasion of Malaya and Singapore. Some featured historical events include the establishment of the Overseas Chinese Mobilisation Council and the Battle of Singapore.
4	Mass Screening 大检证	23–25	This part depicts the Sook Ching Massacre and Lim Bo Seng's establishment of a guerrilla network under Force 136.
5	Lim Bo Seng and Force 136 林谋盛与一三六部队	26–29	This part depicts Force 136's espionage activities in Malaya and the heroic deeds of Elizabeth Choy, along with a glimpse of daily life in Japanese-occupied Singapore.
6	Lim Bo Seng's Death 林谋盛之死	29–32	This part depicts Lim Bo Seng's capture and death at the hands of the Japanese, and the heroic deeds of Sybil Kathigasu.
7	The Price of Peace 和平的代价	32	This concluding segment depicts the Japanese surrender and the honouring of Lim Bo Seng.

=== Synopsis ===
On 7 July 1937, the Marco Polo Bridge Incident sparks off the Second Sino-Japanese War as Japan launches a full invasion on China. Dida Cheng, a deserter from the Chinese army, flees to Malaya, where he meets Cuicui, a Chinese opera actress, and Hideko, a Japanese woman. The three of them are drawn into a complex love triangle. Xie Guomin, an anti-Japanese activist, and Zhou Wenlong, the asthmatic son of a tailor, both fall in love with the porridge vendor Wang Qiumei. After Wang is publicly humiliated by an evil businessman, she is saved by Zhou and decides to marry him. However, she is already secretly pregnant with Xie's child. Their relationships become very strained.

After the Japanese occupied Singapore in 1942, the Sook Ching Massacre takes place when thousands of Chinese deemed to be anti-Japanese activists are rounded up and executed. Following his arrest by the Kempeitai, Xie Guomin becomes a hanjian and informer after succumbing to the enemy under torture. On the other hand, Dida Cheng becomes a resistance fighter and an ally of Force 136, and he continues to fight the Japanese invaders to liberate Singapore.

Historical figures such as the war heroes Lim Bo Seng, Elizabeth Choy and Sybil Kathigasu, the philanthropist Tan Kah Kee, as well as notorious Japanese military figures such as Ishibe Toshiro and Yoshimura Ekio, are also featured as semi-fictional characters in the drama.

== Cast ==
=== Main cast ===
- Rayson Tan as Lim Bo Seng
- Xiang Yun as Elizabeth Choy
- Chen Shucheng as Tan Kah Kee (Chen Jiageng)
- Jacintha Abisheganaden as Sybil Kathigasu
- James Lye as Chen Dacheng
- Lina Ng as Zhang Cuicui
- Christopher Lee as Xie Guomin
- Ivy Lee as Xiuxiu / Natsuki Hideko
- Carole Lin as Wang Qiumei
- Ryan Choo as Zhou Wenlong

=== Other cast ===
- Chen Guohua as Zhang Ada
- Hong Huifang as Wang Jinfeng
- Brandon Wong as Fang Qinghua
- Ken Tay as Zhou Ren
- Chunyu Shanshan as Miura Kiyoe
- Guo Yikai as Ishibe Toshiro
- Wang Jinlong as Yoshimura Ekio
- Wang Kangwei as Zhuang Huiquan
- Xu Bing as Gan Choo Neo (Yan Zhuniang)
- Yang Yue as Konoe
- Ji Qiuxiang as Li Shuyi

== Music ==
The opening titular theme song was performed by Sebastian Tan (Chen Ruibiao), best known as his stage alter ego Broadway Beng. The main themes of the Hong Kong films The Soong Sisters and Shanghai Grand were also extensively used in the series.

== Filming locations ==
The series was shot on location in Singapore at the now-defunct TV World in Tuas, Tan Teck Guan Building, Danish Seamen's Church, St. Andrew's School, Chung Cheng High School (Main), The Chinese High School, and HQ Tanglin Barracks (Ministry of Foreign Affairs Building), among others. Extensive filming was also done in Ipoh, Malaysia.

== Accolades ==
Organisation	Year	Award	Nominee	Result	Ref.
Star Awards	1997	Best Actor	Christopher Lee	Won	
Star Awards	1997	Best Actor	James Lye	Nominated	
Star Awards	1997	Best Actress	Carole Lin	Won	
Star Awards	1997	Best Supporting Actress	Hong Huifang	Won	
Star Awards	1997	Best Supporting Actor	Bryan Chan	Nominated	
Star Awards	1997	Best Supporting Actor	Chen Shucheng	Nominated	
Star Awards	1997	Best Drama Serial	—N/a	Won	
Star Awards	1997	Best Theme Song	"和平的代價" by Sebastian Tan	Won	

== See also ==
- In Pursuit of Peace

Preceded by Tofu Street; 1996	Star Awards for Best Drama Serial; The Price of Peace; 1997	Succeeded by Stand by Me; 1998
