= Innocence Lost =

Innocence Lost may refer to:

- Madonna: Innocence Lost, a 1994 American biographical drama TV film
- X-23: Innocence Lost, 2005 six-issue Marvel comic book miniseries
- Innocence Lost (TV series), a 2016–17 Chinese-language documentary from Singapore
- Innocence Lost, 2017 album by Swedish pop singer and songwriter Erik Hassle

== See also ==
- Loss of Innocence (disambiguation)
- When Innocence Is Lost, a 1997 American drama TV film
