= Star Awards 1997 =

Singaporean television awards

- Date: 5 October 1997
- Location: Caldecott Broadcast Centre, Singapore
- Hosted by: Timothy Chao; Zeng Xiaoying

Highlights
- Best Drama Serial: The Price of Peace
- Best Actor: Christopher Lee for The Price of Peace
- Best Actress: Carole Lin for The Price of Peace

Television/radio coverage
- Network: Television Corporation of Singapore Channel 8
- Produced by: Lin Peiqin; Wen Shusen
- Directed by: Li Yiwen

Star Awards 1997 is the fourth edition of the annual Star Awards presented by the Television Corporation of Singapore to honour its artistes who work on Channel 8.

The award show was held on 5 October 1997, later than its usual June or July dates for the past three shows.

== Winners and nominees ==
Winners are listed first and highlighted in boldface.

Special Achievement Award	
**Huang Wenyong**	
Best Drama Serial	Best Telemovie
**The Price of Peace**; The Unbeatables II; The Royal Monk; Longing; The Choice Partner	**The Matchmaker's Match**; The Scoop; Life on the Line; Hope; Grandpa's Bak Kut Teh
Best Anthology Series	
**Mirror Of Life - Frog Or Prince**	
Top Rated Drama Serial	Top Rated Telemovie
**The Unbeatables II**	**The Gods Must Be Rich**
Best Actor	Best Actress
**Christopher Lee − The Price of Peace as Xie Guomin**; Li Nanxing — The Unbeatables II as Yan Fei; James Lye — The Price of Peace as Di Dacheng; Xie Shaoguang — The Legends of Jigong as Luo Han; Zhu Houren — The Fall Guy as Huaimin	**Carole Lin − The Price of Peace as Wang Qiumei**; Irin Gan — The Choice Partner as Sun Liling; Aileen Tan — Grandpa's Bak Kut Teh as Yu; Zoe Tay — A Different Life as Ou Guikai; Fann Wong — The Matchmaker's Match as Xiang-gu
Best Supporting Actor	Best Supporting Actress
**Richard Low − The Silver Lining as Huang Qinghe**; Chen Guohua — The Price of Peace as Zhang A-da; Chen Shucheng — The Price of Peace as Tan Kah Kee; Chen Tianwen — The Royal Monk as Tie Tong; Huang Yiliang — Brave New World as Gao Hongfei	**Hong Huifang − The Price of Peace as Wang Jinfeng**; Huang Biren — Courting Trouble as Wanqing; Cassandra See — The Unbeatables II as Luo Wenxin; Tracer Wong — Don't Worry, Be Happy as Chen Jiazhen; Yang Libing — River of Love as Liu Shuluan
Top 10 Most Popular Male Artistes	Top 10 Most Popular Female Artistes
**Chew Chor Meng**; **Xie Shaoguang**; **James Lye**; **Christopher Lee**; **Rayson Tan**; **Peter Yu**; **Li Nanxing**; **Chen Tianwen**; **Guo Liang**; **Mak Ho-wai**; Terence Cao; Bernard Tan; Edmund Chen; Chen Shucheng; Ang Puay Heng; Huang Wenyong; Huang Yiliang; Richard Low; Yao Wenlong; Zhu Houren	**Ann Kok**; **Zoe Tay**; **Phyllis Quek**; **Fann Wong**; **Chen Liping**; **Cynthia Koh**; **Pan Lingling**; **Aileen Tan**; **Huang Biren**; **Wong Li Lin**; Ding Lan; Angela Ang; Lina Ng; Diana Ser; Carole Lin; May Phua; Sharon Au; Xiang Yun; Cassandra See; Jacelyn Tay
Most Popular Newcomer	Best Theme Song
**James Lye**; Irin Gan; Wong Li Lin; Hong Liqing; Li Yuling; Michelle Goh; Diana Ser; Darren Lim; Guo Liang; Sharon Au; Deborah Sim; Constance Song; Lynn Poh; Xu Meiluan	**"The Price of Peace"** 和平的代价 **(from The Price of Peace);** **Performed by: Sebastian Tan**; "When Love Passby" 当爱擦身而过 (from The Unbeatables II); Performed by: Jonathan Lee and Zoe Tay; "Si Shui Nian Hua" 似水年华 (from A Different Life); Performed by: Cass Phang; "Living by Night" 夜归 (from Living by Night); Performed by: Mavis Hee; "Don't Let Love Get Torn In-between" 别让情两难 (from Brave New World); Performed by: Fann Wong and Jeff Chang
