= Ryan Choo =

Singaporean educator and actor

- Born: September 1969 or 1970 (age 55–56); Singapore
- Other names: Zou Lianfu
- Occupations: Educator; businessman; actor; host
- Years active: 1995−present

Chinese name
- Traditional Chinese: 鄒聯福
- Simplified Chinese: 邹联福
- Hanyu Pinyin: Zōu Liánfú

Ryan Choo (born in September 1969 or 1970) is a Singaporean agriculture, businessman and former actor. He is best known for his role as Yan Dao in the comedy sitcom Right Frequency.

He is also greatly known for his contributions in agriculture with his father Brian.

== Early life and career ==
Choo dropped out of his mechanical engineering course at Ngee Ann Polytechnic and subsequently enlisted into the army, citing having "no interest" in the course.

He was a former sales supervisor before making his debut through the 1995 Mediacorp's Star Search competition where he was a semi-finalist.

He has starred in television series such as period drama Tofu Street (1996), golf romance series Triumph Over The Green (1996), Brave New World (1996) opposite Alex Man and Fann Wong, blockbuster war drama The Price of Peace (1997) and in the mythical drama The Legends of Jigong (1997).

His contract with Mediacorp ended in 2001.

== Personal life ==
Since 2000s, Choo has been running a student care centre named Star Kidz Powerclub, at Block 509, Bedok North Avenue 3, and serves as the principal. In February 2018, Choo was involved in a police case which was lodged by a parent of an eight-year-old boy. The boy, who had been attending the centre for three years, was playing hide-and-seek with other children at the centre on 31 Jan 2018 and Choo punished the boy for opening the door to a toilet while a girl was using it. Choo had hit the boy on his buttocks and palm with a wooden ruler for 28 times.

In an interview with Lianhe Wanbao in August 2019, Choo said he is a self-professed otaku and revealed that he is single.

== Filmography ==
Choo has appeared in the following programmes:

=== Television series ===
- Heart of the Family (1996)
- Tofu Street (1996)
- Triumph Over The Green (1996)
- Brave New World (1996)
- The Price of Peace (1997)
- The Legends of Jigong (1997)
- My Wife, Your Wife, Their Wives (1997)
- Tales Of The Third Kind (1997; season 3, episode 1: "Feline Shadow")
- Tales of the City (1997; episode 3: "Shadowed Existence")
- Dreams (1998)
- Right Frequency (1998)
- Driven by a Car (1998)
- The Scam (1998)
- A Piece of Sky (1998)
- The Millennium Bug (1999)
- Right Frequency (1999; season 2)
- Right Frequency (2000; season 3)
- Hainan Kopi Tales (2000)
- On The Frontline (2000)
- The Voices Within (2000)
- The Hotel (2001)

=== Variety show ===
- City Spy (2001)

== Awards and nominations ==
Year	Award	Category	Nominated work	Result	Ref
1996	Star Awards 1996	Most Popular Newcomer	—	Nominated	
