= Madam White Snake (disambiguation) =

Madam White Snake is a mythological figure in Chinese folk religion. It may also refer to:

- Madam White Snake (TV series), 2001 television series
- Madame White Snake (opera), 2010 opera

== See also ==
- Legend of the White Snake (disambiguation)
