= In Pursuit of Peace =

- Genre: Period drama
- Written by: Ng Kah Huay; Ang Chee Chuan; Woo Soi Muay
- Directed by: Chia Mien Yang; Li Liwan
- Starring: Qi Yuwu; Apple Hong; May Phua; Pierre Png; Priscelia Chan; Yao Wenlong
- Theme music composer: Ke Guimin; Shah Tahir
- Opening theme: "Awake, Not Asleep" (醒着不睡) performed by Dreamz FM
- Ending theme: "Awake, Not Asleep" (醒着不睡) performed by Dreamz FM
- Composers: Benny Wong; Redwan Ali
- Country of origin: Singapore
- Original language: Mandarin
- No. of episodes: 10

Production
- Producer: Lee Leng Kiong
- Editor: Lai Zhenjiang
- Running time: 90 minutes per episode

Original release
- Network: MediaCorp Channel 8
- Release: 9 March – 11 May 2001

Related
- The Price of Peace (1997); A War Diary (2001)

In Pursuit of Peace (何日军再来) is a Singaporean period drama television series set in Japanese-occupied Singapore during World War II, and was first aired on MediaCorp Channel 8 from 9 March to 11 May 2001 on Friday evenings. The series is based on the 1999 book Eternal Vigilance: The Price of Freedom published by Asiapac Books which contains numerous eyewitness accounts of survivors of the Japanese occupation of Southeast Asia. In contrast with The Price of Peace, a similar television series aired on MediaCorp Channel 8 in 1997, In Pursuit of Peace focuses more on developing the main characters' stories, while the former places greater emphasis on the historical aspects of the Japanese occupation.

== Plot ==
The series is set in Singapore and Malaya during World War II and depicts daily life before and during the Japanese occupation of Singapore from the perspectives of two Chinese families.

The Huangs run an inn in Singapore. Huang Yitang married Li Huaniang, a Nyonya woman, and has two sons (Changfeng and Changman) and a daughter (Yinxiang) with her. The Huangs also adopted an orphaned boy, Changqing, and arranged for him to marry Yinxiang when they have grown up. Their relationships get more complicated as both Yinxiang and Changqing have their own love interests: Yinxiang is enamoured with Dahai, an anti-Japanese activist, while Changqing loves his cousin, Yang Xiaomei. Unknown to everyone, Chen Yong, an employee at the inn, has a crush on Yinxiang.

The Huangs' neighbours, the Lins, own a provision shop. Lin Songde, a widower, lives with his son (Lin Fan) and two daughters (Lin Yun and Lin Shan). The two families have arranged a marriage between Changfeng and Lin Yun when they were still young. Later, when the grown-up Changfeng and Lin Yun meet each other, they fall in love without knowing that they are already engaged. Lin Fan starts a romance with Ah-gui after saving her and her brother from a paedophilic businessman. Lin Shan is in a relationship with Warren, a British soldier, who abandons her later.

Changfeng and Lin Yun are killed in an air raid. Against his father's wishes, Lin Fan joins Dalforce and fights the Japanese during the Battle of Singapore. After the fall of Singapore, he flees to Malaya with Ah-gui, marries her and joins an underground resistance movement. Chen Yong secretly becomes an informer for the Kempeitai and infiltrates the resistance movement at the same time. He uses the Kempeitai to help him get rid of Dahai and Changqing so that he can get closer to Yinxiang and win her heart. Changqing survives, goes into hiding with Yang Xiaomei, and starts a family with her. When the Kempeitai threaten him with Yinxiang's life, Chen Yong turns vicious and betrays the resistance by leading the Kempeitai to their hideout in Malaya. In the ensuing battle, a pregnant Ah-gui sacrifices her life to save Lin Fan.

Lin Shan encounters Nishimura, a Japanese military officer, falls in love with him and eventually marries him, much to her father's chagrin. However, she ends up as a sex slave after Nishimura is assassinated by his rivals. Lin Fan returns to Singapore to take revenge on the traitor who betrayed the resistance, and he warns Yinxiang after discovering that Chen Yong is the traitor. Yinxiang pretends to marry Chen Yong, fatally stabs him on their wedding night to avenge Dahai, and disappears from Singapore. In the meantime, Lin Fan encounters Ding Yueguang, a prostitute, and starts a romance with her after they escape death together on a few occasions. However, they never get together eventually.

At the end of the war, the surviving members of the two families reunite, except Yinxiang, who sends them a letter saying she has gone to Hainan.

== Historical events ==
Historical figures such as Goh Say Eng, Lim Boon Keng and Yamashita Tomoyuki are portrayed in the drama. One episode focuses on Goh Say Eng's internal struggles when he is torn between his role as an anti-Japanese activist and as a parent of a Japanese military officer he fathered years ago with his secret lover in Japan. In another episode, the Japanese force Lim Boon Keng to raise a "donation" of 50 million straits dollars and present it to Yamashita Tomoyuki in a public ceremony.

== Cast ==
- Qi Yuwu as Lin Fan
  - Huang Liren as Lin Fan (old)
- Lynn Poh as Lin Shan
- Richard Low as Lin Songde
- Priscelia Chan as Ah-gui
- Apple Hong as Ding Yueguang
- May Phua as Lin Yun
- Pierre Png as Huang Changfeng
- Yao Wenlong as Chen Yong
- Bernard Tan as Huang Changqing
- Irin Gan as Huang Yinxiang
- Chen Tianxiang as Huang Yitang
- Neo Swee Lin as Li Huaniang
- Jaslyn Theen as Yang Xiaomei
- Li Nanxing as Sakagami Ichiro
- Chen Shucheng as Goh Say Eng
  - Nick Shen as Goh Say Eng (young)
- Robin Leong as Nishimura
- Henry Chong as Wang Changfeng
- Huang Shinan as Ah-shi
- Liang Tian as Tangshan
- Chen Guohua as Uncle Xi
- Ye Shipin as Fujiwara
- Zhou Quanxi as Wu Daichang
- David Naidu as Ah-xing
- Mohan as Ah-xing's father
- Ken Tay as Hattori
- Wang Jinlong as Ōnishi Satoru
- Li Fuliang as Dahai
- Aaron Lester as Warren
- Chen Weijian as Huang Changman
- Li Qinning as Xiaoju
- Wang Yongyou as Huang Duijin
- Lin Wen'an as Lim Boon Keng
- Huang Zhiguang as Yamashita Tomoyuki
- Guan Xuemei as Yang Xiaomei's stepmother
- Azroy Abdul as Ali
- Cai Jianhao as Da-an
- Chen Chaosheng as Xiao-an
- Lin Xinghong as Xu Biaoqing
- Jiang Rongjie as Okishima
- Feng Weizhong as Ah-dai
- Chen Xiuling as Aimei
- Xu Yi as Keiko
- Huang Junqi as Boss An
- Peng Bilin as Qiaoqing
- Luo Aihui as Anna
- Bu Jianxing as Ziqiang
- Cai Qingpao as Ah-gou
- Zhu Enjie as Honggu
- Li Meijiao as Ah-gui's aunt
- Lin Peifang as Lin Yun's grandmother
- Kenneth J. Meals as Professor William
- Huang Degang as Japanese officer
- Li Xiuhua as doctor

== See also ==
- The Price of Peace
- A War Diary
