= Fanntasy =

Studio album by Fann Wong

Studio album by Fann Wong
- Released: 6 October 1996
- Genre: Mandarin pop
- Label: Hype Records (Singapore)

Fann Wong chronology
Fanntasy (1996)	一個人生活; I Live Alone (1997)

Fanntasy is the first album by Fann Wong (Chinese: 范文芳), released on 6 October 1996.

== Track listing ==
1. 无欲无求
2. 别让情两难(与张信哲合唱)
3. 心事
4. 每个梦
5. 假戏真作
6. 星光
7. 到底要不要爱情
8. 爱曾经来过
9. 吹散为你留下的梦
10. 别让情两难 (Karaoke version)

== Recording and production ==
The album costs $240,000 to produce and market. Production of the album took six months.

== Commercial performance ==
10,000 copies were produced and were almost sold out after two weeks from its release. A second issue was done.
