= Danny Yeo =

Singaporean media personality (born 1972 or 1973)

- Born: 1972 or 1973 (age 52–53); Singapore
- Other name: Yang Junwei
- Education: National University of Singapore
- Occupations: Host; theatre director; writer; lecturer

Chinese name
- Traditional Chinese: 楊君偉
- Simplified Chinese: 杨君伟
- Hanyu Pinyin: Yáng Jūnwěi

Danny Yeo (born 1972 or 1973) is a television host, theatre director, published author and studio potter. He has hosted events and travelogue documentaries, as well as written books on culture, social issues and psychology. He is also a World Vision goodwill ambassador in Singapore. In 2010, he was nominated for the "Best Director" award in The Straits Times' theatre awards. He won Best Current Affairs Presenter (Asia) at the 2020 Asian Academy Creative Awards.

== Early life ==
Yeo's Chinese-educated parents encouraged him to be interested in Chinese culture and language, which he studied along with the English language. After he graduated secondary school and junior college, Yeo studied science at the National University of Singapore and pursued a mass communications degree in the United States.

== Career and achievements ==
From the 1990s to the early 2000s, Yeo hosted the morning drive-time show on YES 933 Mandarin radio station and certain variety shows on Mediacorp Channel 8. He won the founder of Pure Talents award for his experience in various fields, Top 20 Most Popular Male Artistes in Star Awards 2000, and the most creative DJ Golden Mic Award in 2000. From 2001 to 2004, he crossed over to television with SPH MediaWorks and helped to operate 2 television channels, Mediacorp Channel U and former Channel i, as well as hosting on UFM100.3, a Mandarin radio station. At the end of 2004, both stations merged, which ended Yeo's career in this area. He then taught at Ngee Ann Polytechnic and Singapore Management University. In 2004, the Singapore Media Academy twice honoured him at the Ngee Ann Polytechnic academic awards for his excellence in teaching. In 2010, he co-wrote the screenplay of the drama film Love Cuts, and in 2014, he co-wrote the screenplay of the basketball film Meeting the Giant. In 2015, he returned to TV on Channel U as host of the popular talk show Face Off! and a lifestyle documentary show about child labour; Innocence Lost (2016) and Innocence Lost II (2017).

== Awards and nominations ==
The Star Awards are presented by Mediacorp.

Year	Ceremony	Category	Nominated work	Result
2000	Star Awards	Top 10 Most Popular Male Artistes	—N/a	Nominated
2023	Star Awards	Top 10 Most Popular Male Artistes	—N/a	Nominated
