= In Love with You =

In Love With You

Compilation album by Fann Wong
- Released: June 17, 2005
- Genre: Mandarin pop
- Label: MediaCorp Studios, Hype Records (Singapore)

Fann Wong chronology
沒有问題; No Problem (2000)	In Love With You (2005)

In Love With You (愛上了你新歌+精選) is Fann Wong (Chinese: 范文芳)'s compilation album featuring four new tracks, released after a five-year break from music. It is available in Singapore only.

== Track listing ==
1. 漸走漸遠
2. 愛上了你
3. 天下有心人
4. Always On My Mind
5. 逛街(live band版)
6. Summer Rain
7. 想你
8. 一個人生活
9. 被愛的權利
10. Luv³
11. 快樂解薬
12. 月亮的秘密
13. 好想
14. 愛就愛 There Is No Why
15. 我相信
16. 你的溫度
17. Stay
