= Loss of Innocence =

Loss of Innocence may refer to:

- Loss of innocence, a common theme in fiction
- Loss of Innocence, the American title of the 1961 British drama film The Greengage Summer
- Loss of Innocence (TV series), a 1978 Australian miniseries about the Great Depression
- "The Loss of Innocence", a 1983 episode of the American TV soap opera Knots Landing; see List of Knots Landing episodes
- A Loss of Innocence, a 1996 American romantic drama TV film

== See also ==
- Innocence Lost (disambiguation)
- The Loss of Sexual Innocence, a 1999 American drama film
- When Innocence Is Lost, a 1997 American drama TV film
