= Supermum =

2019 Malaysian Mandarin-language family drama film

- Directed by: Bjarne Wong
- Starring: Eliza Wong; Remon Lim; Joey Leong
- Release date: May 30, 2019 (Malaysia)
- Running time: 1 hour 34 minutes
- Country: Malaysia
- Languages: Mandarin brief Cantonese

Supermum (Chinese: 媽媽好) is a 2019 Malaysian Mandarin-language family drama film. The film follows as the adult siblings reunites when their old mother falls down, but they soon begins feuding one another for financial problems.

It is a tribute and dedication to the late veteran actress Lai Meng. It is released on 30 May 2019 in Malaysia.

== Synopsis ==
The film begins with the elderly mother who falls down due to an accident. Her hospitalization brings her children and their families together, but the siblings soon begin feuding one another on financial issues. While some are pressured because of their condition, others just hope to live a simpler life. They choose to hurt each another and ignore the importance of being a family.

== Cast ==
- Eliza Wong, as mother
- Remon Lim, as eldest daughter
- Tan Kiong Ann, as eldest son
- Wei Wei, as second daughter
- Sam Loo, as youngest son
- Rabbit Chen, as eldest son-in-law
- Manne Chen, as eldest daughter-in-law
- Sarah Tan Qin Lin, as granddaughter, from eldest daughter
- Joey Leong, as granddaughter, from eldest son
- Jaden Ng Eu-gene, as grandson, from second daughter
- John Tan
- Sanchia Chiu
- Tan Hao Yen
- Smyth Wong
- Tony Ngu

== Production ==
Filming took place in Cameron Highlands and Kuala Lumpur from June to August 2018. Most of the crew, including director Bjarne Wong, are from Sarawak. It was the final project and a tribute to the late Malaysian veteran actress Lai Meng, who had contributed to the local Chinese-language film industry.
