= The Island That All Flow By =

- DVD cover
- Chinese: 川流之島
- Hanyu Pinyin: Chuān Liú Zhī Dǎo
- Written by: Chan Ching-lin
- Directed by: Chan Ching-lin
- Starring: Ivy Yin; Cheng Jen-shuo; Andrew Chen
- Music by: Peter Wang
- Country of origin: Taiwan
- Original languages: Mandarin; Taiwanese

Production
- Producer: Chao Pei-an
- Cinematography: Chen Chi-wen
- Editor: Chan Ching-lin
- Running time: 90 minutes
- Production company: Greener Grass Production

Original release
- Release: April 29, 2016

The Island That All Flow By (also known as The Island of River Flow) is a 2016 Taiwanese television film. It stars Ivy Yin, Cheng Jen-shuo and Andrew Chen. Filming began on January 18, 2016. The film premiered on CTV and CTi Entertainment on April 29, 2016.

== Synopsis ==
The film depicts the story between toll station worker Lin Chia-wen (Ivy Yin) and truck driver Wang Chih-hao (Cheng Jen-shuo). As Lin faces losing her job and her rebellious son Fu Yen-chao (Andrew Chen), how would she deal with all the problems?

== Cast ==
Cast	Role	Description
Ivy Yin	Lin Chia-wen	A single mother who works at the toll station on the National Highway
Cheng Jen-shuo	Wang Chih-hao	A truck driver
Andrew Chen	Fu Yen-chao	Chia-wen’s son
Cheng Yu-ting	Hsieh Ya-li	
Diana Tai	Tsai Shu-chien	A worker at the toll station
Sean Liu	Wang Chih-pin	Chih-hao’s elder brother, boss of the logistics company
Sonia Tsai	Ruby	A female escort

== Filming locations ==
- Banqiao District
  - Xin Min Street
  - Shidiao Park
  - Xin Min Street Police Dormitory
- Taichung City
  - The former Da Jia Toll Station

== Awards and nominations ==
Awards	Category	Recipient	Result	Ref.
51st Golden Bell Awards	Best Miniseries or Television Film	The Island That All Flow By	Won	
51st Golden Bell Awards	Best Actor in a Miniseries or Television Film	Cheng Jen-shuo	Nominated	
51st Golden Bell Awards	Best Actress in a Miniseries or Television Film	Ivy Yin	Won	
51st Golden Bell Awards	Best Supporting Actor in a Miniseries or Television Film	Andrew Chen	Nominated	
51st Golden Bell Awards	Best Newcomer in a Miniseries or Television Film	Andrew Chen	Won	
51st Golden Bell Awards	Best Directing for a Miniseries or Television Film	Chan Ching-lin	Won	
51st Golden Bell Awards	Best Writing for a Miniseries or Television Film	Chan Ching-lin	Won	
51st Golden Bell Awards	Best Cinematography	Chen Chi-wen	Nominated	
51st Golden Bell Awards	Best Film Editing	Chan Ching-lin	Nominated	
51st Golden Bell Awards	Best Sound	Gerbow Chiu, Peter Wang and Joseph Yeh	Nominated	
51st Golden Bell Awards	Best Lighting	Ben Chuang	Nominated	
54th Golden Horse Awards	Best Actress	Ivy Yin	Nominated	
54th Golden Horse Awards	Best New Director	Chan Ching-lin	Nominated	
19th Taipei Film Awards	Best Actress	Ivy Yin	Won	
