= Legend of the White Snake (disambiguation) =

The Legend of the White Snake is a Chinese legend. It may also refer to:

- The Legend of the White Serpent (film), also known as The Legend of the White Snake, 1956 Japanese film
- The White Snake Enchantress, also known as The Legend of the White Snake, 1958 Japanese film
- The Legend of the White Snake (TV series), 2019 Chinese TV series

== See also ==
- Madam White Snake (disambiguation)
