= Desmond Sim =

Singaporean writer (born 1961)

- Born: 1961 (age 64–65) Singapore
- Occupation: Playwright, poet, writer
- Genre: Theatre, screenwriting, poetry

Desmond Sim Kim Jin (born 1961) is a Singaporean playwright, poet, short story writer, screenwriter and painter. His work, Places Where I've Been, won a Merit Prize in the 1993 Singapore Literature Prize for Poetry.

== Career ==
Almost all of his 30 plays to date have been performed in professional theatres in Singapore, Malaysia and the United States. He was TheatreWorks' first playwright-in-residence and has been the associate artistic director of ACTION Theatre since April 2004, running Singapore Theatre Oasis, an incubator programme for new and existing Singaporean playwrights. He has participated in the Shanghai Literary Festival and was awarded a Fulbright fellowship. Desmond has also co-written two movies: Beautiful Boxer (2003) and The Wedding Game (2009). He is an acknowledged Peranakan painter who has held more than a dozen exhibitions on Peranakan figurative themes. Desmond also teaches playwriting, branding, marketing and communications at Temasek Polytechnic School of Design and Lasalle College of the Arts.

== Selected plays ==
- 1992: Blood and Snow
- 1993: Sammy Won't Go to School
- 1993: Elizabeth by Night
- 1994: Drunken Prawns and Other Edible Delights
- 1994: A Singapore Carol
- 1995: Corporate Animals
- 1995: Teochew Porridge
- 1996: Who's Afraid of Chow Yuen Fatt?
- 1998: Drift
- 1999: Shrimps in Space
- 1999, 2000: The Swimming Instructor
- 2001: Autumn Tomyum
- 2002: MRT
- 2004: Hubbies4hire
- 2006: Fairy Godfather
- 2007: Postcards from Rosa
- 2009: Wife #11
- 2010: Perfecting Pratas

== Publications ==
- Mistress and Other Creative Takeoffs (1990, Landmark Books, ISBN 9813002395)

Co-author with Ovidia Yu and Kwuan Loh

- Places Where I've Been (1994, EPB Publishers, ISBN 978-9971006037)

Poetry

- Student Plays (Epigram Books, 2013, ISBN 978-9810756918)

Contents: Drunken Prawns, MRT, Perfecting Pratas, The Chair, Shrimps in Space, Teochew Porridge, The Durian Man and His Daughters

- Six Plays (Epigram Books, 2013, ISBN 978-9810756895)

Contents: Autumn Tomyam, Elizabeth by Night, Fairy Godfather, Postcards from Rosa, Wife #11, The Swimming Instructor

== Painting ==
- In the Peranakan-styled art that he is now best known for, Desmond is totally self-taught, although a strong influence from Modigliani, Rousseau, de Lempicka and Art Deco is prevalent.
