= James Lye =

Singaporean banker and actor (born 1969)

- Born: 17 June 1969 (age 57); Singapore
- Other name: Lai Xingxiang
- Education: Anglo-Chinese School; Anglo-Chinese Junior College
- Alma mater: Arizona State University
- Occupations: Banker; former actor
- Years active: 1995-present
- Spouse: Diana Ser (m. 2004)
- Children: 3

Chinese name
- Traditional Chinese: 賴興祥
- Simplified Chinese: 赖兴祥
- Hanyu Pinyin: Lài Xìngxiáng

James Lye Tiang Kang (born 17 June 1969) is a Singaporean banking executive and former Mediacorp television actor.

== Early life ==
Lye was educated at Anglo-Chinese School and Anglo-Chinese Junior College in Singapore, and at Arizona State University in the United States.

== Career ==
Lye first entered the entertainment industry in 1996 with Television Corporation of Singapore and has starred in both English-language and Chinese-language shows. He left the industry after a brief acting career. His last drama was The Millennium Bug in 1999.

Lye has since worked in the banking sector and was the head of markets with Citibank International Personal Bank in Singapore. He was recruited as the global head of international banking by Standard Chartered Bank in October 2022.

== Personal life ==
On 27 June 2004, Lye married former Channel NewsAsia presenter Diana Ser after a nine-year courtship. The couple have a son and two daughters.

== Filmography ==
=== Television series ===
Year	Title	Role	Notes	Ref
1995-1999	Triple Nine	Inspector Mike Chin		
1997	The Price of Peace	Chen Dacheng		
1998	VR Man	Alex Foo		
1998	Season of Love	Ding Weijie		
1999	The Millennium Bug (千年虫)	Liu Xingyu		

=== Film ===
Year	Title	Role	Notes	Ref
1999	The Truth About Jane and Sam	Man in the pet shop		
2000	2000 AD	Eric Ong		
2000	When I Fall in Love... with Both	Chi Sing		

== Awards and nominations ==
Year	Ceremony	Award	Nominated work	Result	Ref
1997	Star Awards	Best Actor	The Price of Peace (as Di Da Cheng)	Nominated	
1997	Star Awards	Most Popular Newcomer	—N/a	Won	
1997	Star Awards	Top 10 Most Popular Male Artistes	—N/a	Won	
1999	Star Awards	Top 10 Most Popular Male Artistes	—N/a	Won	
