= Sybil Kathigasu =

Malayan nurse

Servant of God Sybil Medan Kathigasu GM
- Sybil Kathigasu with George Medal, 1947
- Born: Sybil Medan Daly; 3 September 1899; Medan, Sumatra, Dutch East Indies
- Died: 12 June 1948 (aged 48); Lanark, Scotland, United Kingdom
- Resting place: Lanark, Scotland (1948-1949); St Michael Church, Ipoh, Perak, Malaya
- Monuments: No. 74 Main Road, Papan, Perak, Malaysia
- Occupations: Nurse, midwife
- Known for: Surviving torture under the Japanese Imperial Army during the Japanese occupation of Malaya
- Notable work: No Dram of Mercy
- Spouse: Abdon Clement Kathigasu (m. 1919–1948)
- Children: 3
- Relatives: Elaine Daly (grandniece)
- Awards: George Medal (1948)

Sybil Medan Kathigasu GM (née Daly; 3 September 1899 – 12 June 1948) was a Malayan Eurasian nurse who supported the resistance during the Japanese occupation of Malaya. She is the only Malayan woman to be awarded the George Medal for bravery.

In July 2024, the Bishop of Penang, Cardinal Sebastian Francis, opened her cause for canonization. In consequence of this step, she is referred to as a Servant of God.

== Early life ==
Kathigasu was born to Joseph Daly, an Irish-Eurasian planter, and Beatrice Matilda Daly (née Martin), a French-Eurasian midwife, on 3 September 1899 in Medan, Sumatra, Dutch East Indies (thus reflected in her middle name). Her paternal grandparents were an Irishman and a Eurasian woman while her maternal grandparents were a Frenchman named Pierre Louis Martin and a Eurasian woman named Adeline Regina Martin née Moret. She was the fifth child and the only girl.

Kathigasu was trained as a nurse and midwife and spoke Cantonese fluently. She was a vegetarian.

== Marriage and family ==
While she was practising nursing and midwifery at the Kuala Lumpur General Hospital, Kathigasu first met Dr. Arumugam Kanapathi Pillay, a second-generation Malaysian Ceylonese, born on 17 June 1892 in Taiping to Kanapathi Pillay and Thangam, immigrants of Sri Lankan Tamil origin. Initially there had been objection from her parents due to their religious differences: him being a Hindu while Kathigasu was Catholic. With agreement from his father, he became a Catholic and was renamed as Abdon Clement Kathigasu. Their wedding took place in the old St. John's Church (present location of St. John's Cathedral) in Bukit Nanas, Kuala Lumpur on 7 January 1919.

Kathigasu's first child was a son born on 26 August 1919, but due to major problems at birth, died after only 19 hours. He was named Michael after Kathigasu's elder brother, who was born in Taiping on 12 November 1892 and later joined the British Army and was killed in action on 10 July 1915 while taking part in the Gallipoli campaign.

The devastating blow of baby Michael's death led to Kathigasu's mother suggesting that a young boy, William Pillay, born 25 October 1918, who she had delivered and had remained staying with them at their Pudu house, should be adopted by Kathigasu and her husband. Then a daughter, Olga, was born to Kathigasu in Pekeliling, Kuala Lumpur, on 26 February 1921. The earlier sudden death of baby Michael made Olga a very special baby to Kathigasu, when she was born without problems. So when Kathigasu returned to Ipoh on 7 April 1921, it was not only with Olga, but also with William and her mother who had agreed to stay in Ipoh with the family. A second daughter, Dawn, was born in Ipoh on 21 September 1936.

Their children are:

1. William Pillay (25 October 1918 — death unknown), adopted son, married Winnifred Ng Paik Choo in Ipoh in January 1949, and had two daughters, Patricia and Joyce
2. Michael Kathigasu (26 August 1919), died after only 19 hours of being born
3. Olga Kathigasu (26 February 1921 — 6 September 2014)
4. Dawn Kathigasu (21 September 1936 — death unknown; alleged suicide), married William Bruce Spalding in London on 1 September 1956 and later had children.

She and her husband, Dr. Kathigasu, operated a clinic at No. 141 Brewster Road (now Jalan Sultan Idris Shah) in Ipoh from 1926 until the Japanese invasion of Malaya. The family escaped to the nearby town of Papan days before Japanese forces occupied Ipoh. The local Chinese community fondly remembered her husband, who was given the Hakka nickname "You Loy-De".

== Freedom fighter ==
Residing at No. 74 Main Street in Papan, Kathigasu and her husband secretly kept shortwave radio sets and listened to BBC World Service broadcasts. As she was able to speak fluent Cantonese, Kathigasu and her husband were able to quietly supply medicines, medical services and information to the resistance forces - members of 5th Independent Regiment Malayan Peoples' Anti-Japanese Army (MPAJA).

In July 1943, Kathigasu's husband was arrested. Kathigasu was arrested a month later. They were both subjected to cruel methods of torture from the Kempeitai. Kathigasu had to endure water torture, where water was forced down a victim's throat and Japanese soldiers would later step on the bloated stomach. Kathigasu also had to endure watching her husband and children being tortured in front of her. When her five-year-old daughter Dawn was tied to a stake over a burning fire, she yelled "Mummy, I love you very much!" This signified her resolve that neither of them would speak and give in to the torture. This led to other torture methods.

Despite being interrogated and tortured by the Japanese military police for two years, Kathigasu and her husband persisted in their efforts and were thrown into Batu Gajah jail in Feb 1945. Kathigasu's husband was sentenced to 15 years imprisonment while she received a life sentence. After Malaya was liberated from the Japanese in August 1945, she went to St Joseph Church in Batu Gajah to pray before Kathigasu was flown to Britain for medical treatment. There, she began writing her memoirs. This took her two years. She wrote under her underground code name, Sab. Kathigasu received the George Medal for Gallantry several months before her death on 12 June 1948. She is the only Malayan woman to be awarded the George Medal for bravery.

== Death and memorial ==
Kathigasu died on 12 June 1948 aged 48 in Britain and her body was buried in Lanark, Scotland. Her body was later returned in 1949 to Ipoh and reburied at the Catholic cemetery beside St. Michael's Church opposite the Main Convent of the Holy Infant Jesus (now SMK Convent) on Brewster Road (now Jalan Sultan Idris Shah) in Ipoh. It is reported that the cause of death was due to a wound on Kathigasu's jaw left by a Japanese soldier which led to fatal septicaemia. A road, Jalan Sybil Kathigasu, in Fair Park, Ipoh was named after Kathigasu after independence to commemorate her bravery. Today, the shop house at No. 74 Main Road, Papan, serves as a memorial to Kathigasu and her efforts.

== Veneration ==
In July 2024, the Bishop of Penang, Cardinal Sebastian Francis, announced that, in light of her outstanding example of missionary witness, he was opening a cause to examine Kathigasu's life for her possible canonization. In consequence of this step, she is referred to as a Servant of God.

== Published works ==
- No Dram of Mercy (Neville Spearman, 1954; reprinted Oxford University Press, 1983 and Prometheus Enterprises, 2006) : This autobiography was completed in 1948. It was published in 1954 by Neville Spearman in the United Kingdom and reprinted in 1983 by Oxford University Press. Publishers in Malaysia were not interested in publishing this autobiography until Prometheus Enterprises in 2006.
- Faces of Courage: A Revealing Historical Appreciation of Colonial Malaya's Legendary Kathigasu Family by Norma Miraflor & Ian Ward (2006, ISBN 978-981-05-5141-4)

== Legacy and in popular culture ==
- Kathigasu is played by Jacintha Abisheganaden in the TV drama series The Price of Peace.
- In 2010, a ten-part miniseries drama based on her life was produced by Malaysian satellite television company Astro and Red Communications titled Apa Dosaku? (Malay: What Is My Sin?). Kathigasu's role was played by model and actress Elaine Daly, who also happens to be her grandniece.
- In 2016, Google Malaysia commemorated her 117th birthday with a special Doodle; depicting her in her former Papan residence.

== Sources ==
- "Edith of Malaya". Time. 28 June 1948. Archived from the original on 20 June 2007.
- Ho, Tak Ming (2000). Doctors Extraordinaire. Perak Academy. pp. 113–115. ISBN 983-40556-0-9.
