= The Lucky Stars =

- Also known as: My Lucky Stars
- Traditional Chinese: 福祿壽三星報喜
- Simplified Chinese: 福禄寿三星报喜
- Hanyu Pinyin: Fú Lù Shòu Sān Xīng Bào Shòu
- Directed by: Liu Zhi
- Starring: Bobby Au-yeung; Chang Shih; Christopher Lee; Fann Wong; Xu Zheng; Kou Zhenhai; Ning Jing
- Ending theme: "Zhu Ni Ping'an" (祝你平安) performed by Sun Yue
- Country of origin: China
- Original language: Mandarin
- No. of episodes: 30

Production
- Producer: Li Mi
- Running time: 45 minutes

The Lucky Stars is a 2005 Chinese fantasy/costume comedy-drama TV series on Fu Lu Shou, 3 Chinese mythology deities or stars. It was directed by Liu Zhi and produced by Li Mi and Beijing-based NMG Pictures.

The show stars Malaysian actor Christopher Lee, Taiwanese actor Chang Shih and Hong Kong actor Bobby Au-yeung in the lead roles, while Singaporean actress Fann Wong and mainland China actors Xu Zheng, Kou Zhenhai and Ning Jing round out the main cast. It was first broadcast on Singapore's MediaCorp Channel 8 on December 6, 2005. In China it was first broadcast on Guangzhou Television on January 9, 2006.

== Cast ==
- Christopher Lee as Fu Star (God of Fortune)
- Chang Shih as Lu Star (God of Prosperity)
- Bobby Au-yeung as Shou Star (God of Longevity)
- Fann Wong as Magu
- Xu Zheng as Zhang Guolao
- Kou Zhenhai as Jade Emperor
- Ning Jing as Wangmu Niangniang
