= Brotherhood (2002 TV series) =

Singapore TV series

- Also known as
- Traditional Chinese: 有情有義
- Simplified Chinese: 有情有义
- Hanyu Pinyin: Yǒu Qíng Yǒu Yì
- Starring: Jordan Chan; Huang Yi; Christopher Lee; Fann Wong; Hao Lei
- Country of origin: China; Singapore
- Original language: Mandarin
- No. of episodes: 28

Production
- Running time: 45 minutes
- Production companies: MediaCorp; Beijing Yahuan Media

Brotherhood (simplified Chinese: 有情有义; traditional Chinese: 有情有義; pinyin: Yǒu Qíng Yǒu Yì) is a 2002 modern television serial jointly produced by Singapore's MediaCorp and China's Beijing YaHuan Media Co. (北京亚环影音), in conjunction with Beijing Broadcasting Institute. Starring Hong Kong actor Jordan Chan, Singaporean-based celebrity couple Fann Wong and Christopher Lee as well as mainland Chinese actresses Huang Yi and Hao Lei, the serial is set in modern-day Shanghai and Singapore, telling of the inter-generational feud between two twin brothers. It stars Jordan Chan, Huang Yi, Christopher Lee, Fann Wong, and Hao Lei.

== Cast ==
- Jordan Chan – He Fan
- Christopher Lee – He Ping
- Fann Wong – Li Ting
- Huang Yi – Zhou Ying
- Hao Lei – Zhou Qian
- May Phua

== Broadcast ==
Brotherhood premiered on Mediacorp's Channel 8 on 5 May 2002 with a 2-hour special.

== Accolades ==
Year	Award	Category	Nominee	Result	Ref
2002	Star Awards	Best Supporting Actress	Lin Meijiao	Nominated	
