= Right Frequency =

Right Frequency (播音人) was a 1998 24-episode sitcom starring Johnny Ng, Lina Ng, Sharon Au and Ryan Choo. The show later continued with Right Frequency II up to 1999. The show has rerun many times - in 2001, 2002, 2008 and 2020.

== Plot ==
The show, set in the 1960s, centers on the happenings in the Chinese-language radio station called Radio Delightful Sounds, abbreviated RDS.

== Characters ==
- Cheng Meiguang (Sharon Au)

Meiguang is the new bird of the radio station. She is somewhat ditzy and often daydreams.

- Handsome (Ryan Choo)

Also known as Yan Dao. He is metrosexual and uses his charms to date girls, but to no avail.

- Li Qing (Johnny Ng)

The veteran broadcaster. His tastes clash with that of Madam Bai.

- Madam Bai (Hong Huifang)

The station supervisor. She often clashes with Li Qing, a running gag in the series.

- Piaoyin (Lina Ng)

Also known as Little Trumpet. She is hot-tempered and tomboyish, and often go against Handsome.

- Mee Pok (Fu Kangrui)

The office boy who also helper at Meiguang family coffeeshop. He is longwinded and sleepwalks.

- Cheng Meili (Yeo Yann Yann)

Meiguang's younger sister that always dreamt to be a film star but foiled in studies.
