= Ivy Yin =

Taiwanese actress

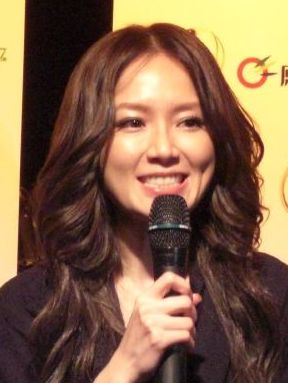
- Yin at the 2008 Golden Bell Awards ceremony
- Born: July 14, 1978 (age 48); Taoyuan, Taiwan
- Other names: Yin Hsin; Yin Xin; Yin Shin; Ivy Yi
- Education: Taipei First Girls' High School
- Occupation: Actress
- Years active: 1999–present

Ivy Yin (Chinese: 尹馨; born July 14, 1978) is a Taiwanese actress whose career includes roles in television films and series.

== Filmography ==
=== Film ===
Year	English title	Original title	Role	Notes
2005	Dragon Eye Congee	龍眼粥	Ivy	
2007	Undercover	危險人物		
2007	A Mob Story	人在江湖	Chi-ling	
2007	Help Me, Eros	幫幫我愛神	Shin	
2008	Talking With Your Boyfriend's Ex-Girlfriend	與男友的前女友密談	Shushu	Television; also screenwriter
2010	Rubbish Fish	垃圾魚	Chiao	Television
2011	Love. MIT	愛．MIT媠氣啦	Maggie	Television
2012	The Moonlight in Jilin	吉林的月光	Pien Wei-wei	Television
2012	Touch of the Light	逆光飛翔	Ms. Wang	
2013	The Will to Power	權力過程	Wu Ya-li	Television
2013	Are You Christine?	交錯	Chia-chia	Television
2014	Almost Heaven	回家的女人	Yue-mei	Television
2014	Amnesia	失憶證	Ko Lo-han	Television
2014	Anywhere, Somewhere, Nowhere	到不了的地方	Nǚ ren yu	
2016	The Island That All Flow By	川流之島	Lin Chia-wen	Television
2017	The Deserted	家在蘭若寺	Fish spirit	VR film
2018	Tipping Point	引爆點	Mrs. Kang	
2019	A Sun	陽光普照	Aunt Yin	

=== Television series ===
Year	English title	Original title	Role	Notes
2001	Poor Prince	貧窮貴公子	Mei-yao	
2003	Wintry Night II	寒夜續曲	Lin A-chen	
2004	Amor de Tarapaca	紫藤戀		
2005	A.S.T.	偵探物語		
2005	Love On Old Mountain Railway	戀戀舊山線		
2008	Marriage of Three Daughters	女仨的婚事		
2008	Golden Line	黃金線	Young Chin-hsien	
2008	Love at Moon Bar	愛在月亮酒吧		
2008	Rich Dad Poor Dad	窮爸爸富爸爸	Zhu Meishan	
2009	Letter 1949	我在1949，等你	Yun-chi	
2009	Free as Love	浮生若夢	Chiu Hsiu-jung	
2013	The Dangerous City	城市·獵人	Amber	
2014	Fabulous 30	女人30情定水舞間	Tseng Ying-hua	
2017	Cambrian Period	寒武紀	Chin Lin	Webseries
2018	Your Children Are Not Your Children	你的孩子不是你的孩子		
2022	Lesson in Love	第9節課	Hsie Shu-fen	Webseries
2024	The Victims' Game	谁是被害者	Hsiao Min-Chun	Webseries

=== Variety show ===
English title	Original title	Notes/Ref.
Super Rookie	超級新人王	Host

== Theater ==
Year	English title	Original title
2010	Notice from a Bachelorette	徵婚啟事

== Published works ==
- Yin, Ivy (1999). Xia Ke Hou: Shi Da Yin Xin. Taipei: Jing Yu Chuan Bo. ISBN 957-98083-3-3.

== Awards and nominations ==
Year	Award	Category	Nominated work	Result
2008	43rd Golden Bell Awards	Best Writing for a Miniseries or Television Film	Talking With Your Boyfriend's Ex-Girlfriend	Won
2008	43rd Golden Bell Awards	Best Actress in a Miniseries or Television Film	Talking With Your Boyfriend's Ex-Girlfriend	Nominated
2013	48th Golden Bell Awards	Best Actress in a Miniseries or Television Film	The Will to Power	Nominated
2013	15th Taipei Film Awards	Best Supporting Actress	The Will to Power	Won
2013	Seoul International Drama Awards	Best Actress	Are You Christine?	Nominated
2014	49th Golden Bell Awards	Best Actress in a Miniseries or Television Film	Almost Heaven	Won
2016	51st Golden Bell Awards	Best Actress in a Miniseries or Television Film	The Island That All Flow By	Won
2017	19th Taipei Film Awards	Best Actress	The Island That All Flow By	Won
2017	54th Golden Horse Awards	Best Actress	The Island That All Flow By	Nominated
