= Diana Ser =

Singaporean host and journalist (born 1972)

- Born: 26 April 1972 (age 54); Singapore
- Other name: Xu Xiuying
- Education: CHIJ Saint Nicholas Girls' School; Victoria Junior College
- Alma mater: National University of Singapore; Nanyang Technological University
- Occupations: Television presenter; journalist; actress
- Years active: 1990s-present
- Spouse: James Lye (m. 2004)
- Children: 3

Chinese name
- Traditional Chinese: 徐秀盈
- Simplified Chinese: 徐秀盈
- Hanyu Pinyin: Xú Xiùyíng
- Hokkien POJ: Sîr Siù-êng

Diana Ser Siew Yien (born 26 April 1972) is a Singaporean host, journalist, Channel NewsAsia presenter and actress. She was a full-time Mediacorp artiste from 1990 to 2008. She left Mediacorp in 2008 and now runs a communications consulting and media training company.

== Early life and career ==
Diana Ser's father is an ethnic Chinese of Teochew descent and her mother has English ancestry. Ser attended CHIJ Saint Nicholas Girls' School, Victoria Junior College, the National University of Singapore (NUS) and the Nanyang Technological University (NTU) of Singapore. In 2005, she was awarded the Nanyang Alumni Award from NTU, where she received a Masters in Mass Communication.

Ser co-hosted an episode of Glamour Mum and The Dude on MediaCorp Channel 8 with Bryan Wong in 2008.

== Personal life ==
On 27 June 2004, Ser married former Singaporean actor James Lye after a nine-year courtship. The couple have a son Jake and two daughters Christy and Jaymee.

== Selected filmography ==
Ser has appeared in the following programmes:

=== Television series ===
- Can I Help You? (1996)
- Three Rooms (1997)
- Crimes and Tribulations (1997)
- The Prime Years (1997)
- From The Medical Files II (1999)

=== Show host ===
- Talk Shop
- Beach Games
- Get Real
- Talking Point
- Sunday Brunch (1994)
- Crimewatch (Singaporean TV series) (1995) (Mandarin version)
- Juedui Xingwen (1999)
- Glamour Mum and The Dude (2008)
- Touch Of Hope (2012; documentary)
- Innocence Lost (2016; documentary)
- President's Star Charity (2020)
- President's Star Charity (2023)

== Awards and nominations ==
Year	Ceremony	Category	Nominated work	Result
1997	Star Awards	Best Newcomer	—N/a	Nominated
1997	Star Awards	Top 10 Most Popular Female Artistes	—N/a	Nominated
1999	Star Awards	Top 10 Most Popular Female Artistes	—N/a	Nominated
1999	Star Awards	Best Variety Show Host	Juedui Xingwen	Nominated
2004	Asian Television Awards	Best Current Affairs Presenter	Get Real	Nominated
2005	Star Awards	Top 10 Most Popular Female Artistes	—N/a	Nominated
2018	Star Awards	Top 10 Most Popular Female Artistes	—N/a	Nominated
