= Lai Meng =

Malaysian actress

Datuk Lai Meng AMN
- Lai in 2011
- Born: Lai Kwai Yoon; 29 September 1928; Benut, Johor, Malaysia
- Died: 6 May 2018 (aged 89); Kuala Lumpur, Malaysia
- Other name: Aunty Lai Meng
- Occupation: actress
- Years active: 1952-2018
- Notable work: Empat Sekawan, Money No Enough 2

Chinese name
- Traditional Chinese: 黎明
- Simplified Chinese: 黎明
Transcriptions
Standard Mandarin
- Hanyu Pinyin: Lí Míng
Yue: Cantonese
- Jyutping: Lai4 Ming4
Southern Min
- Hokkien POJ: Lê Bêng

Lai Kwai Yoon
- Traditional Chinese: 黎桂潤
- Simplified Chinese: 黎桂润
Transcriptions
Standard Mandarin
- Hanyu Pinyin: Lí Guìrùn
Yue: Cantonese
- Jyutping: Lai4 Gwai3 Jeon6
Southern Min
- Hokkien POJ: Lê Kùi-jūn

Datuk Lai Kwai Yoon (simplified Chinese: 黎桂润; traditional Chinese: 黎桂潤; pinyin: Lí Guìrùn; Jyutping: Lai4 Gwai3 Jeon6; Pe̍h-ōe-jī: Lê Kùi-jūn; 29 September 1928 - 6 May 2018), known professionally as Lai Meng (Chinese: 黎明; pinyin: Lí Míng; Jyutping: Lai4 Ming4; Pe̍h-ōe-jī: Lê Bêng), was a Malaysian actress. She appeared in many Malaysian and Singaporean films and TV shows, notably Empat Sekawan, Ah Long Pte Ltd, Money No Enough 2, Taxi! Taxi! and Supermum.

== Early life ==
Lai was born in Benut, Pontian District, Johor, Malaysia on 29 September 1928, her full name was Lai Kwai Yoon. (Note: Her date of birth on Chinese lunisolar calendar, as on her tomb, is 16 of 8th lunar month of 1928, which would make her date of birth on the Gregorian calendar as 29 September 1928.) With a passion for singing, Lai joined Malacca Meng Seng Charitable Association's choir and occasionally held performances with the choir. After catching a performance of Lai by chance, an established singer, Hoi Yong struck a friendship with her and would later spark her interest in becoming a singer later on. However due to Lai's godfather's prior experiences while working in gambling dens, he dissuaded Lai from becoming one until when she was 21 in 1949.

== Career ==
In 1949, Lai started performing on stage in Kuala Lumpur as a getai singer with the stage name, Lai Meng. She soon struck close friendships and would usually perform with Hon Ying, Hoi Yong and Wong Hor. In 1952, the four decided to join a radio station and started broadcasting a radio show, Empat Sekawan, a comedy skit with dialogue in various Chinese dialects intermingled with Malay. Due to the radio show, the four went on to cast in a movie, You Qiu Bi Ying (有求必应) in 1964. Similarly, the multi-dialect laden movie was well received in Malaysia's box office. The radio show was so well received that it evolved into a television show which was broadcast on a Radio Televisyen Malaysia's television channel in 1966. However due to governmental pressure in promoting Mandarin Chinese in Malaysia and the increasing popularity of Hong Kong and Taiwanese television shows within the nation, Empat Sekawan ended broadcast in 1988.

After Empat Sekawan ended and although Lai had lost her job, as the local entertainment industry in Malaysia and Singapore was maturing, she soon joined a movie production company despite her advanced age and knowing that she would not be able to get lead roles anymore. However, the production company also went bankrupt soon after. Due to her husband's illness, Lai took up a sales role to support her family until 2006. Her husband died in 2006.

In 2008, Jack Neo decided to cast Lai in Ah Long Pte Ltd, and attested to her professionalism as an actress. Lai soon accepted roles in the next Jack Neo movie being Money No Enough 2. Her acting did not go unnoticed and was recognised when she was nominated for Golden Horse Award for Best Supporting Actress for portraying an Alzheimer's-ridden mother in Money No Enough 2 in 2008. In 2013, Lai also starred in Singaporean movie Taxi! Taxi!.

== Retirement and later life ==
Lai had a fall in 2016, requiring her to use a wheelchair. She then took a break from acting. Subsequently in 2017, Lai announced her retirement with a 89th birthday gala dinner that was well attended by other artistes and friends from the entertainment industry, saying that even though she didn't earn much over the years, she had no regrets.

Lai Meng died on 6 May 2018, at the age of 89 of stroke. She was interred at the living tomb that was given to her in 2013 at the Nirvana Memorial Garden in Semenyih, Selangor.

Before Lai died, she wanted to act one last time for her fans. Her godson, Bjarne Wong decided to honour her wish by directing Supermum, which warm and joyful story-line was influenced by her optimistic personality. However before her scenes could be filmed, her health debilitated with a stroke. Instead, Eliza Wong, a Malaysian actress who called Lai her godmother, played Lai's role of the matriarch, and recorded messages from Lai were included throughout the movie. The movie was released on 30 May 2019, during the time of the year which usually occupied by summer blockbusters. This was done in conjunction with Parents' Day in Malaysia, and as well as a celebration of her first death anniversary.

== Filmography ==
Films
| Year | Title | Role | Notes | Ref. |
|---|---|---|---|---|
| 1964 | 有求必应 | | | |
| 2008 | Ah Long Pte Ltd | Wang Lihua's Mother | | |
| 2008 | Money No Enough 2 | Mother Yang | Nominated for Golden Horse Award for Best Supporting Actress | |
| 2009 | Where Got Ghost? | Mother Yang | | |
| 2009 | Love Matters | | | |
| 2009 | The Wedding Game | | | |
| 2012 | Dance Dance Dragon | Mother Long | | |
| 2012 | The Golden Couple 金童玉女 | | Supporting role | |
| 2013 | Taxi! Taxi! | | | |
| 2019 | Supermum | | Posthumous release; credited as an executive producer | |

Radio shows
| Year | Title | Role | Notes | Ref. |
|---|---|---|---|---|
| 1952 | 客人卖女儿 | | | |
| 1952 - 1966 | Empat Sekawan 四喜临门 | | | |

Television
| Year | Title | Role | Notes | Ref. |
|---|---|---|---|---|
| 1966 - 1988 | Empat Sekawan 四喜临门 | | | |
| 1987 | 提防小手 | | | |
| 1988 | 城市妙人 | | | |

== Awards and honours ==
In 1978, Lai was awarded the Ahli Mangku Negara by Yang di-Pertuan Agong of Malaysia of the time, Sultan Yahya Petra.

In 2008, Lai was nominated for Golden Horse Award for Best Supporting Actress for portraying an Alzheimer's-ridden mother Money No Enough 2 in 2008.

In 2013, Lai was awarded the title of ‘Datuk’ by the Sultan of Pahang.

In 2017, Lai received the Lifetime Achievement Award at the inaugural Malaysia Golden Global Awards for her various contributions to the Malaysian Chinese film industry.
