= Innocence Lost (TV series) =

- Chinese: 童工
- Hanyu Pinyin: Tóng Gōng
- Genre: Lifestyle Documentary Show
- Presented by: Diana Ser; Joanna Dong; Danny Yeo
- Country of origin: Singapore
- Original language: Chinese
- No. of series: 2
- No. of episodes: Season 1: 10 (19 April - 21 June 2016); Season 2: 8 (7 February - 28 March 2017)

Production
- Production location: Singapore
- Running time: 46 minutes

Original release
- Network: Mediacorp Channel U
- Release: 19 April 2016

Innocence Lost (Chinese: 童工) is a Chinese lifestyle documentary show about child labour which produced by Mediacorp Channel U from Singapore. It is hosted by rotating persons, including Diana Ser, Joanna Dong and Danny Yeo on difference episodes. Lifestyle documentary show are introduce the employment of children in any work, the child from poverty family, who have lose their adolescence, interfered their ability to attend school in regularly, also dangerous and harmful to physically, mentally, socially and morally.

== Synopsis lists ==
Every episodes duration taken 46 minutes to telecast, the first season have 10 episodes was released on 19 April 2016, and the second season have 8 episodes was released on 7 February 2017.

=== Season 1 ===
Episodes	Synopsis	Date telecast on	Host by
1.	Two 10 years-old child labour named Linh and Hao, who live in a village nearby Ho Chi Minh City, Vietnam, their employment salary was lower than 3 SGD (2.20 USD) per day, Linh's family was forced to move house while Hao remained to work for survive.	19 April 2016	Diana Ser
2.	A 15 years-old child labour named Ly Sok, who live in Cambodia, he employment with hundreds people in a huge of rubbish dump site to scavenge and collecting an miscellaneous for sell.	26 April 2016	Joanna Dong
3.	A 12 years-old child labour named Sendoy, who live in Philippines, he employment in sugarcane plantation, and work for cutting the sugarcane in long hours under the swelter heat of hot sun at field with his colleague of children labour and adult workers, despite the legislation law are prohibited.	3 May 2016	Diana Ser
4.	Two child labour, 9 years-old named Rishi and 10 years-old named Mukti, who live in Nepal, they employment in event of electrocution during midnight time for carrying the procession lights, and approximately 10 kg of mass, they works in order to maintain their poverty family for survive.	10 May 2016	Danny Yeo
5.	Two boys live in Jaipur, India, they and their family who works as gemstone hub polisher at home, which they rescued from a bangle-making workshop for debt payment. According to India nationality official report, at least 14 million of population are illegally in child labour.	17 May 2016	Danny Yeo
6.	A 13 years-old child labour named Vannak, who live in nearby Phnom Penh, Cambodia, he and his family walking on the streets for peddling their goods and services to earn an income for their maintenance to survive.	24 May 2016	Joanna Dong
7.	Every year, there are approximately 60 thousands of child labour who employment at about 800 brick factories in Nepal, Their family and they who live in polluted factory and works for 12 to 16 hours per day, every months salary is about 35,000 Nepalese Rupee (465.60 SGD or 341.50 USD) in order to maintain for survive.	31 May 2016	Danny Yeo
8.	Three 10 years-old child labour who employment and live at a balloon factory in Dhaka, Bangladesh. They handle for making and boiling the rubbers and chemicals with their bare hand, and without wearing clothe and gloves. They have to work for livelihood due to their poverty family, while the legislation law are prohibited.	7 June 2016	Diana Ser
9.	An 11 years-old child labour named Joshua live in Philippines, he and his dad who tailed the footsteps of generation into extremely depth of mining pits for exposing the poisonous mercury to produce prized beads of gold, he intervention the works for maintain family when he was 6 years-old.	14 June 2016	Danny Yeo
10.	An 11 years-old child labour named Kaosar live in a village that 60 km away from Barisal, Bangladesh, he and his children labour colleague who employment at shipyard, also as blacksmith. They works hard as like their father for surviving their 3 daily meals on day.	21 June 2016	Joanna Dong

=== Season 2 ===
Episodes	Synopsis	Date telecast on	Host by
1.	Two child labour boys named Jomari and Chris John who live in poor village at Luzon, Philippines. They cutting trees in illegally to produce charcoals, watch the fire at overnight, hiring and delivering those charcoals that approximately 42 kg of mass for their family have 3 daily meals to survive. This filming was recorded on 4–11 November 2016.	7 February 2017	Danny Yeo
2.	There was approximately 30 thousands of nonage meager children in Muay Thai, Thailand who employment as a boxer and arduous training to get their income for livelihood maintenance, this is prohibited to the legislation law.	14 February 2017	Diana Ser
3.	An 11 years-old child labour named Ratna live in the island of Lombok, Indonesia. She, her family and children labour colleague who works as flourishing the tobacco at industry which nearby beaches to produce cigarettes. Their blood, sweat and tears of farmhands for maintain their livelihood.	21 February 2017	Diana Ser
4.	A 12 years-old child labour named Hakim who live in Dhaka, Bangladesh. He employment in dark, dusty and noisy factory for manufacturing the aluminium pots, he only coated with metallic dust and operating a heavy machinery without wearing any safety gears for his works. This filming was recorded on 18–24 December 2016.	28 February 2017	Danny Yeo
5.	A 14 years-old child labour named Kroch Kreit (KK) live in Cambodia, he and other children labour who employment as boat driving on circumstances, they use forced muscle to engage a hard works for exchanging their meager wage to in order for survive.	7 March 2017	Diana Ser
6.	There was entire of child labour in Lombok, Indonesia who employment as jockey, some of the horse racing children aged are even only 5 years-old, they stake and throwing into the wind on gallop down at tracks as they venture their live. This filming was recorded on 3–6 January 2017.	14 March 2017	Danny Yeo
7.	A 13 years-old child labour named Thare live at rural area in Myanmar, he, his family and other children labour colleague who works as rock carrier. They bear the burdening on family of their shoulder for livelihood, after they suffering from decades of poverty, due to nation conflict on military rule.	21 March 2017	Diana Ser
8.	A 12 years-old child labour named Naani who live in India, she boiling the wax for making block print in business when the smoke was thick on melting process while she is feared might became the next victim of boy get burned, which live beside her at next door. A child labour named Sahul and his 5 family members live at under the bridge in India, he and his elder sister who works as garbage picking for in order to feed their livelihood. This filming was recorded on 14–18 January 2017.	28 March 2017	Danny Yeo
