= The Defining Moment =

Book about President Franklin Roosevelt's first 100 days in office

The Defining Moment: FDR's Hundred Days and the Triumph of Hope
- Author: Jonathan Alter
- Language: English
- Genre: Political History
- Publisher: Simon & Schuster
- Publication date: May 2, 2006
- Publication place: United States
- Media type: Print (Hardcover & Paperback)
- Pages: 432 pages
- ISBN: 0-7432-4600-4
- OCLC: 63680088
- Dewey Decimal: 973.917092 B 22
- LC Class: E807 .A784 2006

The Defining Moment: FDR's Hundred Days and the Triumph of Hope is a political history book by Jonathan Alter about the first 100 days of Franklin D. Roosevelt's presidency. The book also focuses on how Roosevelt's childhood, personal life, diagnosis of polio, and early political life prepared him for those early days in which he established the New Deal to fight the Great Depression.

In The Defining Moment, Alter presents Roosevelt and his presidency as the perfect mold of man and moment. Alter argues Roosevelt's willingness to experiment and try new ideas, along with his willingness to abandon ideas that fail and try something else, proved to be a tremendous asset; in Alter's words, Roosevelt "threw a lot of things against the wall to see what stuck." Alter also said Roosevelt's inspirational leadership led to psychological victories which helped the country recover from an economic crisis. The book also highlighted the fact that prior to Roosevelt's election, some feared capitalism and democracy were in danger, while suggestions were raised by some about the need for fascism, socialism or communism.

During an interview with 60 Minutes on November 14, 2008, then-President-elect Barack Obama said he had recently been reading The Defining Moment and hoped to apply some of Roosevelt's strategies that were outlined in the book into his own administration. Some reviewers have said Alter's book brings to mind similarities between Obama and Roosevelt's rise to the presidency, in that both men overcame difficulties, both exuded tremendous confidence, both embodied a message of hope and both came to office during difficult economic times.
