= Zodiac: The Race Begins =

- Official movie poster for Zodiac: The Race Begins
- Directed by: Edward Fu
- Written by: Zhao Jing Chen
- Produced by: Sky Li
- Starring: Dennis Chew; Fann Wong; Tom Arnold
- Distributed by: Shaw Organisation
- Release date: January 26, 2006
- Running time: 90 minutes
- Country: Singapore
- Languages: Mandarin; English

Zodiac: The Race Begins (Chinese: 生肖传奇) is a CGI film produced by Singapore's Cubix Pictures. The film was released in the city state on January 26, 2006.

It is Singapore's first 3D animated film and recounts the legend behind the ancient Chinese zodiac on how 12 animals came to be chosen as its symbols. Its script, researched by Singapore-based freelance playwright and former cross-talk celebrity Zhao Jin, incorporates eight myths.

In 2007, it was released in Malaysia and the Philippines on Disney Channel Asia in English.

== Cast ==
35 artists were cast in the voiceovers for the show. This includes prominent Singaporean actress Fann Wong and popular Singaporean DJ Dennis Chew.

- Dennis Chew as the Rooster, the Rat, Evil court official
  - Tom Arnold as Ringo the Rat (American English)
- Fann Wong as the Snake
- Jamie Yeo
- Vernetta Lopez
- Colin Gomez

== Critical response ==
Brian Costello of Common Sense Media gave this film a 1/5 stars, writing that the film "is rife with unlistenable songs, unlikeable characters, terrible acting, and the thinnest of storylines".
