= Beautiful Illusions =

- 镜中人
- Starring: Fann Wong; Thomas Ong; Qi Yuwu
- Opening theme: 镜中人 sung by Fann Wong
- Country of origin: Singapore
- Original language: Chinese
- No. of episodes: 20

Production
- Running time: approx. 45 minutes

Original release
- Network: MediaCorp TV Channel 8
- Release: 18 April – 13 May 2005

Beautiful Illusions (镜中人) is a Singaporean TV series which aired in 2005. It stars Fann Wong in two diverse roles - a quiet and undistinguished cartoon illustrator with a quirky sense of style (Yixin), and a fashionable, vampy air stewardess who lives the high life on her motorbike (Joe Ann). The series title literally means "person in the mirror" and alludes to the main character.

== Story ==
A young Yixin (Fann Wong) watches her father get stabbed to death in a park by a teen delinquent Jiansheng (Thomas Ong) who is later sentenced to 17 years in jail. Psychologically scarred by the memory of her father's death, Yixin grows up bitter and vengeful, even though she appears docile and sweet outwardly. When Jiansheng is released, she discovers that he is in fact the son of a wealthy family, and embarks on a mission to sow discord between him and his family.

Little does she realise that Jiansheng comes from a troubled background. He and his brother Jianwei lived in fear of their alcoholic and violent father. One day, their mother, Esther, decides to escape with the children, but unfortunately leaves Jiansheng behind. Later, Esther remarries and leaves for America with Jianwei. Thinking that she has abandoned him, Jiansheng develops a hatred for his mother.

Meanwhile, Jianwei grew up and became a playboy. He returns to Singapore, where he meets the cool and mysterious Joe Ann. Jiansheng meets Yixin and love blossoms between them. They try to get their girlfriends to meet each other, but always in vain. Before long, the brothers realise that Yixin and Joe Ann look alike. Was this a case of an 'evil twin' or could they be the same person?

== Production notes ==
- Fann Wong was nominated for Best Actress at the Singapore Star Awards 2005 for this role.
- Fann Wong performed the theme song of this serial, which was also nominated for Best Theme Song at the Singapore Star Awards 2005.
- This serial was nominated for Best Serial in the same awards ceremony.

== Awards ==
Accolades	Award	Nominee	Result
Star Awards 2005 Show 2 红星大奖 2005 下半场	Best Actress 最佳女主角	Fann Wong 范文芳	Nominated
Star Awards 2005 Show 2 红星大奖 2005 下半场	Best Theme Song 最佳主题曲	Fann Wong 范文芳	Nominated
Star Awards 2005 Show 2 红星大奖 2005 下半场	Best Drama Serial 最佳电视剧	—N/a	Nominated

== Cast ==
- Fann Wong - Wang Yixin, Joe Ann
- Thomas Ong - Zhou Jiansheng
- Qi Yuwu - Zhou Jianwei
- Yvonne Lim - Lu Xiaofen
- Lin Liyun - Esther Wong
- Jimmy Nah - Bai Cai (Cabbage)
- Nick Shen
- Joey Ng
- Yan Bingliang
