= Doppelganger (TV series) =

- 入侵者
- Genre: Drama; Thriller; Suspense
- Written by: 刘健财 谢光华 何启安
- Directed by: Canter Chia 谢光华 王靖瑜 / 韩耀光
- Starring: Christopher Lee; Fann Wong; Xu Bin; Jasmine Sim
- Opening theme: 说散就散 by JC
- Ending theme: 别说 by JC 心跳 Heartbeat by Christopher & Kelly Poon 炸药 by Power Station 换我爱你 by Derrick Hoh 我会一直想你 by Jocie Kok
- Country of origin: Singapore
- Original language: Chinese
- No. of episodes: 20

Production
- Executive producers: 刘健财 Molby Low 谢光华 Canter Chia
- Producer: 刘健财 Molby Low
- Running time: approx. 45 minutes (excluding advertisements)

Original release
- Network: Mediacorp Channel 8
- Release: 12 March – 6 April 2018

Related
- Mind Matters; A Million Dollar Dream

Doppelganger (Chinese: 入侵者) is a Singaporean Chinese drama which was produced by Wawa Pictures and telecast on Singapore's free-to-air channel, Mediacorp Channel 8. It was first shown in 2018, and was broadcast on weeknights. The show aired at 9 p.m. on weekdays and had a repeat telecast at 8 a.m. the following day. This drama serial consists of 20 episodes, and it stars Christopher Lee, Fann Wong, Xu Bin and Jasmine Sim.

The drama was the first drama with a prequel, which was first aired on Toggle on 11 March 2018 from 7 to 9 pm as a telemovie.

== Casts ==
- Christopher Lee as Yang Li Wei 杨立威 / Li Rui Ming 李锐明 Li Rui Ming's teenage version portrayed by Brian Ng
- Fann Wong as Wang Siting 王思婷 Teenage Version portrayed by Elizabeth Lee
- Xu Bin as Li Zijian 李子健
- Jasmine Sim as Li Jiawen 李嘉文
- Darren Lim as Li Ruijie 李锐杰
- Ricky Liew as Chen Shuntian 陈顺天, a fortune teller
  - Young Ricky Liew played by Ethan Ng

=== Supporting cast ===
Cast	Character	Description	Episodes Appeared
Rebecca Lim 林慧玲	Zhang Ailing 张爱玲	Supporting Villain Teo Ailing: Yang Li Wei's Former Woman; Betrayed Yang Li Wei; Chen Shuntian's girlfriend	1,10- 14
Kelly Liao 廖奕琁	Liang Qiao En 梁乔恩	Villain: Li Ruiming's Secretary & lover; Li Zijian's Love Interest	1 - 16
Ernest Chong 张顺源	Liu Yao Qiang 刘耀强	Came from Canada; Li Jiawen's Friend; Li Jiawen's love interest; In Charge of Props	6 - 7, 11, 14,17,18
Zhu Houren 朱厚任	Li Jianting 李建廷	Lee Kian Teng, Ting (廷): Li Ruijie's & Li Rui Ming's Father; Favor Li Ruijie over Li Rui Ming; Former CEO; Had extra marital in the past	4, 14, 18
Lai Meng 黎明	Yang Xiangwei's Mum	Yang Xiangwei's ex-mum; Died after a sudden heart attack	1
Ann Kok	Wang Jingyi 王静仪	Yang Xiangwei's ex-wife; Died while giving birth to a child	1

- Eelyn Kok as Chen Shuntian's mother
- Hayley Woo as Chen Tianmei 程天美, an actress who is the female lead of a movie.
- Zhang Xinxiang

== Original Sound Track (OST) ==
No.	Song title	Singer(s)	Notes
1)	说散就散	JC	Opening Theme Song
2)	别说	JC	
3)	心跳 Heartbeat	Christopher and Kelly Poon	
4)	炸药	Power Station	
5)	换我爱你	Derrick Hoh	
6)	我会一直想你	Jocie Guo	

== Accolades ==
Organisation	Year	Category	Nominee(s)	Result	Ref
Star Awards	2019	Best Actress	Fann Wong	Nominated	
Star Awards	2019	Best Actor	Christopher Lee	Nominated	
Star Awards	2019	Best Supporting Actor	Xu Bin	Nominated	
Star Awards	2019	Best Newcomer	Jasmine Sim	Won	

== See also ==
- List of programmes broadcast by Mediacorp Channel 8
