= I Live Alone (album) =

Studio album by Fann Wong
- Released: September 12, 1997
- Genre: Mandarin pop
- Label: Hype Records (Singapore), EMI (Taiwan)

Fann Wong chronology
Fanntasy (1996)	I Live Alone (1997)	逛街; Shopping (1998)

I Live Alone is Fann Wong's (Chinese: 范文芳) Fanntasy album repackaged with two additional songs for the Taiwanese music market. It was released on 12 September 1997.

== Track listing ==
1. 一個人生活
2. 別讓情兩難(与張信哲合唱)
3. 心事
4. 假戲真作
5. 化妝
6. 被愛的權利
7. 每個夢
8. 星光
9. 愛曾經來過
10. 吹散為你留下的夢

== Reception ==
In the week of 30 November 1997, the album was one of the top 10 albums sold in Singapore.
