= The Unbroken Cycle =

- VCD cover
- 解连环
- Genre: Period drama
- Starring: Fann Wong; Thomas Ong; Huang Peiru
- Opening theme: Music
- Country of origin: Singapore
- Original language: Chinese
- No. of episodes: 5

Production
- Running time: approx. 45 minutes

Original release
- Network: TCS-8
- Release: 1996

The Unbroken Cycle (解连环) is a TV drama series produced by the former Television Corporation of Singapore (predecessor of MediaCorp, starring Singapore actors Fann Wong and Thomas Ong. A television adaptation of a mystery novel by Singaporean novelist Wu Weicai about the fate of two star-crossed lovers over three lifetimes in pre-war (1920s), post-war (1950s) and modern Singapore, this 1996 drama serial won Fann Wong her first regional nomination as Best Actress at the Asian Television Awards.

== Cast ==
- Fann Wong - Ye Qin, Li Xiangmei, Zhu Zhiyue (Fourth Wife) a.k.a. Xibao
- Thomas Ong - Zhou Xinghuan, Zhang Hai
- Carole Lin
- Huang Peiru
