= The Wedding Game =

- Film poster
- Directed by: Ekachai Uekrongtham
- Written by: Dennis Chew; Desmond Sim; Ekachai Uekrongtham
- Produced by: San San Ng
- Starring: Fann Wong; Christopher Lee
- Music by: Hagen Troy
- Production companies: Mediacorp Raintree Pictures; Scorpio East Pictures; Double Vision; Speedy Productions
- Distributed by: Golden Village Pictures
- Release date: 25 January 2009
- Running time: 103 minutes
- Countries: Singapore; Malaysia
- Language: Mandarin
- Budget: S$1.5 million

The Wedding Game is a 2009 romantic comedy film directed by Ekachai Uekrongtham, co-produced by MediaCorp Raintree Pictures (Singapore), Scorpio East Pictures (Singapore), Double Vision (Malaysia) and Speedy Productions (Malaysia) starring real life couple Fann Wong and Christopher Lee.The film centers on actors Jack Fang (Christopher) and Vikki Tse (Fann) who orchestrate a faux engagement to boost their showbiz careers.

== Plot ==
Jack Fang publicly proposes to Vikki Tse during the live telecast of a regional awards show, which Vikki accepts. The audience is unaware of the relevant love affair of these two celebrities, Jack and Vikki, which is an elaborate and meticulously planned ruse designed by their ambitious managers, May and Tom, to trick the public into believing that they are getting married. In reality, Jack has disliked Vikki from the first day they met and vice versa. Yet for fame and money from endorsements, these rival celebrities keep up with their “fake” marriage to increase their popularity. Once this tension settles, an incident rattles some of the fans and the media. There is now doubt amongst the audience about the authenticity of this love match.

== Cast ==
- Fann Wong as 谢文琪 Vikki
- Christopher Lee as 方子杰 Jack
- Blackie Chen as 汤哥 Tom
- Alice Lau 刘雅丽 as 阿美 May
- Daniel Tan 陈家风
- Lai Meng
- Saiful Apek
- Chin Chi Kang 钱自刚
- Jazreel Tan
- Jing Jun Hong
- Kendrick Lee
- Tao Li

== Production ==
The film was written by Dennis Chew, Desmond Sim and Ekachai Uekrongtham, and directed by Ekachai Uekrongtham, and was shot in Singapore and Malaysia, Malacca. The working title for the film was originally The Wedding of the Year, but it was officially changed to The Wedding Game.

The Wedding Game marks Singapore Sports Council and production company Raintree Pictures' first silver screen collaboration. As this is the first time Team Singapore athletes are featured in a movie.

Filming took less than a month and occurred in late 2008.

== Soundtrack ==
Hagen Tan collaborated with veteran musician Ng King Kang for the production, soundtrack producer and music arranger are filled in by local talent too.

- 1. 我们的爱 (Hagen Tan and Christy Yow 姚惠敏)
- 2. 双喜 (Hagen Tan)
- 3. 习惯 (吴庆康 and 陈丽伊 Katherine Tan)
- 4. 爱反复 (Hagen Tan)
- 5. 爱反复 (吉他伴奏版)
- 6. 我们的爱 (钢琴伴奏版)
- 7. 我舍不得 (Demo 版)

== Release ==
Mediacorp Raintree Pictures held the Singapore premiere of The Wedding Game on 23 January 2009 at the Golden Village Cinemas in both Great World City and VivoCity at 7.30pm and 9.00pm respectively. Its Malaysia premiere was held on 22 January 2009 at The Pavilion. The film opened in Singapore on 25 January 2009.

== Reception ==
=== Box office ===
The Wedding Game has raked in S$1.25 million at the Singapore box office since it opened in Singapore on 25 January despite strong competition from other titles. It has also done well in Malaysia, collecting an impressive RM$2 million as of 1 February.

=== Critical reception ===
The rating of this movie was publicly discussed, as The Wedding Game was argued to be too erotic, obscene and unsuitable for the young, despite being rated PG, while its main local competitor Love Matters was rated NC-16 by the censorship board.
