= Dragon Eye Congee =

Dragon Eye Congee: A Dream of Love
- Directed by: Chang Kuo-fu
- Written by: Bo Yang
- Produced by: Lee Hsing
- Starring: Fann Wong; Shaun Tam; Ivy Yin
- Distributed by: Lee's Production
- Release date: 9 December 2005
- Running time: 93 minutes
- Country: Taiwan
- Languages: Mandarin; English; Cantonese
- Budget: NT$5 million

Dragon Eye Congee: A Dream of Love (Chinese: 龍眼粥) is a 2005 Taiwanese romance film set in the 1960s. Produced by Lee Hsing and directed by Allen Chang, the film stars Singapore's Fann Wong, Hong Kong's Shaun Tam and Taiwan's Ivy Yin.

== Plot ==
Based on a short story of the same name written in the 1950s by the Taiwanese intellectual and democracy activist Bo Yang, Dragon Eye Congee tells the story of a second-generation Taiwanese American, Shaun Tam, who, since childhood, has repeatedly dreamt about the same woman in the same scenes, complete with a haunting melody and the fragrant smell of rice congee with dried longan.

He is totally mystified about the significance of the dream until he comes to Taiwan for the first time on a business trip and stumbles upon an old house and a woman played by Fann Wong, resembling those in his dreams. Eventually, he realizes that the woman was his lover in a previous lifetime in Taiwan.

== Cast ==
- Fann Wong
- Shaun Tam
- Ivy Yin
- Chiu Ting

== Production ==
The film was produced by veteran Taiwanese director Lee Hsing of Lee's Production Ltd (李行工作室有限公司), who came out of retirement to produce his first film in 20 years (since 1984), funding NT$2 million. The director of the film is Allen Chang Kuo-Fu, the winner of the Golden Horse Award Best Short Film in 2000.

== Festival ==
The film was nominated for five categories, including Best Film/Best Director, Best Actress, and Best Screenplay at the inaugural Asian Festival of First Films 2005, held in Singapore. The film was screened at the Golden Horse Film Festival in 2005.
