= Asiapac Books =

Singaporean publisher

- Status: Active
- Founded: 1983
- Founder: Lim Li Kok
- Country of origin: Singapore
- Distribution: Worldwide
- Nonfiction topics: Asian culture, history, philosophy, health practices, art and literature.
- Official website: www.asiapacbooks.com

Asiapac Books is a Singaporean publisher that publishes educational comics and illustrated books on Asian culture, history, philosophy, health practices, art and literature. Established in 1983, its publications are now sold in more than 20 countries, and have been translated into more than 20 languages. Asiapac Books also publishes two monthly educational magazines Montage Edition and VITA Edition, targeted at school students.

In 1997, Asiapac Books represented Singapore as a delegate to the 1997 Asian Comic Books Conference held in South Korea.

Asiapac Books specialises in using illustrations to engage readers. Its Origins and Gateway series introduces readers to Chinese and Singaporean cultures respectively through the rich use of images and quirky stories. It has published illustrated and adapted versions of Chinese classics such as Journey to the West, A Dream of Red Mansions, and Water Margin.

Asiapac Books is a member of the Singapore Book Publishers Association.

== Popular titles ==
- Origins of Chinese Culture illustrated by Fu Chunjiang
- Origins of Chinese Festivals illustrated by Fu Chunjiang
- Origins of Chinese Cuisine illustrated by Fu Chunjiang
- Gateway to Peranakan Culture illustrated by Wing Fee
- Top Learning Tips by Chitra Soundar and illustrated by Jack Cheong
- Analects of Confucius 1, 2 and 3 by Jeffrey Seow
- Essential Chinese Medicine Health Tonics edited by Professor Zhang Bao Chun and Associate Professor Chen Yu Ting from the Beijing University of Chinese Medicine
