= Madam White Snake (TV series) =

2001 TV series

- Genre: Romance fantasy
- Starring: Fann Wong; Christopher Lee
- No. of episodes: 45

Production
- Production companies: MediaCorp; Young Pei-pei's Workshop

Madam White Snake (青蛇与白蛇 or 白蛇新传) is a wuxia TV drama series jointly produced by MediaCorp (Media Corporation of Singapore) and Taiwanese producer Young Pei-pei's Workshop. It was aired in 2001.

Starring a pan-Asian cast including celebrity couple Fann Wong and Christopher Lee, as well as Taiwanese actors Zhang Yuyan and Vincent Chiao, this sword fighting serial deftly explored in comic and tragic ways the politics of revenge through a well-executed and performed script. The serial was filmed in Hengdian City, Zhejiang Province of China, which formed a beautiful backdrop for this serial.

The television serial was based on a legendary folk tale (Madame White Snake), involving a snake spirit and her male human lover, but was adapted in this version to include the presence of a black snake who is the snake spirit's mentor and the White Snake Spirit being trapped under the pagoda for 20 years, when in the original tale she was trapped under the tower for centuries.

As for the Green Snake, the White Snake imprisons her for a short time (a few hours) before releasing her, unlike the original where she imprisoned her for three centuries. Xu Xian is also initially a good-for-nothing who, under the white snake's guidance, becomes an official.

The serial attained high viewership ratings in Taiwan and China. It also broadcast in Indonesia (Indosiar).

== Cast ==
- Fann Wong - Madam White Snake, White Snake spirit, Bai Suzhen, Qin Xiaoxiao, Xi Shi
- Christopher Lee - Xu Xian, Xu Shilin, Lord Wu
- Crystal Chang (张玉嬿) - Green Snake
- Vincent Chiao - Shi/Miao Junbao, Fahai
