= Looking for Stars =

- 星锁
- Genre: Romance
- Written by: Rebecca Leow 洪汐
- Directed by: Paul Yuen 袁树伟
- Starring: Fann Wong; Christopher Lee
- Original language: Chinese
- No. of episodes: 12

Original release
- Network: TCS-8
- Release: 27 December 2000

Looking for Stars
- Traditional Chinese: 星鎖
- Simplified Chinese: 星锁
Transcriptions
Standard Mandarin
- Hanyu Pinyin: Xīng Suǒ

Looking For Stars is a MediaCorp-produced drama serial that starred celebrity couple Fann Wong and Christopher Lee. It tells the story of two star-crossed lovers who have to live with each other's quirks, idiosyncrasies and foibles after a one-night stand in Tokyo.

== Cast ==
- Fann Wong - Orange
- Christopher Lee - Henry Lu Haoye
- Ix Shen
- San Yow - Tequila
- Vivian Lai - Peggy
- Xiang Yun - Zheng Baozhu
- Liang Tian - Orange's grandfather
- Cynthia Koh - Cai Feifei
- Zhang Xinxiang

== Awards and nominations ==
Accolade	Award	Nominee	Result
Star Awards 2001 Show 2 红星大奖 2001 下半场	Best Actor 最佳男主角	Christopher Lee 李铭顺	Nominated
Star Awards 2001 Show 2 红星大奖 2001 下半场	Best Supporting Actor 最佳男配角	Yao Wenlong 姚彣隆	Won
Star Awards 2001 Show 2 红星大奖 2001 下半场	Best Drama Serial 最佳电视剧	—N/a	Nominated
