= Christopher Lee (Singaporean actor) =

Singaporean actor (born 1971)

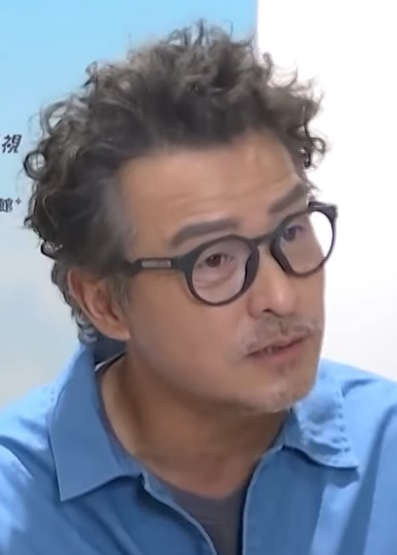
- Lee in June 2025
- Born: 23 July 1971 (age 55); Malacca, Malaysia
- Citizenship: Malaysia (1971–2010s) Singapore (2010s–present) (Note: In a 2022 interview, Lee mentioned that he had obtained Singaporean citizenship "a few years ago". Neither Malaysia nor Singapore permits multiple citizenship for its citizens.)
- Occupations: Actor; host; singer; businessman
- Years active: 1994–present
- Agent: Catwalk Production House
- Spouse: Fann Wong (m. 2009)
- Children: 1
- Awards: Full list

Birth name
- Traditional Chinese: 李銘順
- Simplified Chinese: 李铭顺
- Hanyu Pinyin: Lǐ Míngshùn
- Jyutping: Lei5 Ming4 Seon6
- Hokkien POJ: Lí Bêng-sūn

Former stage name
- Traditional Chinese: 李名順
- Simplified Chinese: 李名顺
- Hanyu Pinyin: Lǐ Míngshùn

Christopher Lee Meng Soon (Note: Chinese: See Chinese names and romanisations) (born 23 July 1971) is a Singaporean actor, host and businessman. He is known for starring in many Chinese-language television dramas and films in Singapore, Taiwan and mainland China. At the age of 26, Lee rose to prominence after winning the Star Awards for Best Actor for his role in The Price of Peace, becoming the youngest ever recipient of the award.

Lee is widely regarded as an "Ah-Ge" (阿哥, "big brother") of Caldecott Hill for being one of the most successful actors in Singapore's Chinese-language entertainment industry. He is the only Singapore-based actor to have won multiple Best Actor accolades at both Singapore's Star Awards and Taiwan's Golden Bell Awards.

== Early life ==
Lee was born in Malacca, Malaysia. He has an older sister and two younger brothers, the youngest being Frederick Lee Meng Chong, a Malaysian actor and model.

== Career ==
Lee joined Television Corporation of Singapore on a contract in 1995 after emerging as 1st runner-up in the male category of the Star Search programme in 1995. He worked as a factory worker, salesman and part-time model before joining star search in 1995. Lee first started acting in Chinese-language television dramas produced by Channel 8.

=== Rise to prominence ===
Lee rose to prominence after winning the Best Actor award at the Star Awards 1997 for his role as a hanjian in the television drama The Price of Peace, set in Japanese-occupied Singapore during World War II. He was voted in as one of the Top 10 Most Popular Male Artistes that same year.

In 1998, he starred as Yang Guo in The Return of the Condor Heroes, an adaptation of Louis Cha's novel of the same title. The drama achieved high ratings in Taiwan, and Lee was voted in as Taiwan's Most Popular MediaCorp Male Artiste at the Star Awards 1998 for his performance.

Since then, Lee has acted in many television series jointly produced by Singapore and other countries in the Asia-Pacific region, co-starring with actors from Hong Kong and Taiwan, such as Nadia Chan, Vincent Chiao, Jimmy Lin and Jordan Chan.

Apart from acting, Lee also recorded the theme songs of MediaCorp's television dramas. He released his first solo album in 1999 and another one in 2002.

Apart from acting, Lee has also ventured into hosting and has hosted several travel and food programmes. He was nominated for the Best Info-Ed Show Host award at the Star Awards 2012.

At the Star Awards 2013, Lee won his second Star Awards for Best Actor for his role in Show Hand.

=== Regional acclaim ===
For his role as a depressed workaholic in A Good Wife, Lee won his first Golden Bell Award for Best Leading Actor in a Television Series at the 2014 Golden Bell Awards, Taiwan's equivalent of the Emmy Awards.

Lee would go on to win the Golden Bell Award for Best Leading Actor in a Miniseries or Television Film at the 2021 Golden Bell Awards for his role as a construction worker obsessed with money in the HBO comedy Workers.

In 2022, Lee won the Golden Bell Award for Best Supporting Actor in a Television Series in the iQiyi crime thriller Danger Zone.

In 2023, Lee ended veteran host Quan Yi Fong's five-year winning streak when he won the Star Awards for Best Programme Host at the 2023 Star Awards.

== Ventures ==
On 9 November 2021, Lee launched a golf clothing brand, eponymously named LMS, the initials of his Chinese name in pinyin.

== Personal life ==
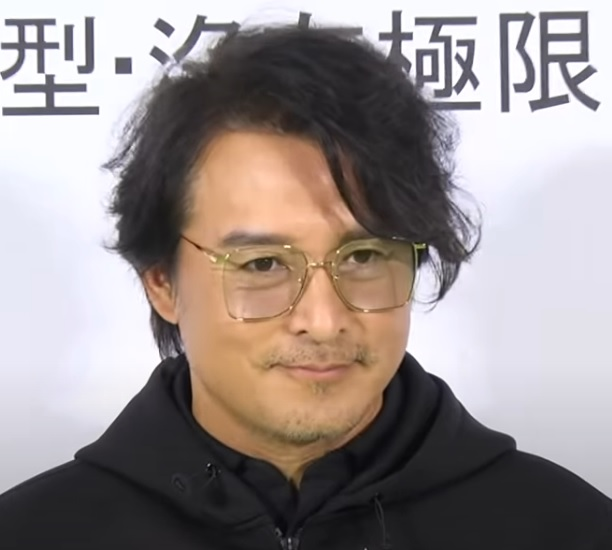
Lee in December 2021

Lee is married to Fann Wong, his co-star in several television series, on 16 May 2009. They have a son who was born in 2014.

=== Legal issues ===
On 8 October 2006, Lee was involved in a hit-and-run road accident. He had allegedly knocked down a motorcyclist due to suspected drunk driving, causing the motorcyclist and his pillion rider to suffer superficial injuries on their faces and legs. He failed the breathalyser test and was more than twice the legal limit. He was arrested and released later on bail.

Despite the incident, Lee managed to win a position among the Top 10 Male Artistes in the Star Awards 2006. In his acceptance speech, Lee said that he had been feeling terrible over the incident during the previous two months, and that he would be responsible for what he did. Speaking to reporters later, he mentioned that he had been unable to sleep at times, adding that he was very grateful to his fans for their support.

On 10 May 2007, Lee was fined S$4,500 and disqualified from driving for three years on charges of drunk driving and other traffic offences, as well as being sentenced to a prison term of four weeks after he admitted to drink driving, inconsiderate driving, failing to render aid to the injured motorcyclist and his injured pillion rider and removing his car from the scene without police permission. Lee appealed against his jail sentence but withdrew his appeal later on 28 May. He began serving his sentence at Queenstown Remand Prison on the same day. On 15 June, the prosecution succeeded in appealing against Lee's four-week jail sentence and the court decided to overturn an earlier sentence of a S$3,000 fine for his drunk driving offence. Lee was sentenced to an additional two weeks in prison, making his total prison term six weeks long. On 21 June, the prosecution dropped the last of five charges against Lee for failing to stop after an accident, letting him off with a stern warning instead. Lee was released on 25 June, after receiving a reduction in his prison sentence due to good behaviour.

Due to his conviction, Lee was dropped from playing the lead role in the 2007 Channel 8 television series Metamorphosis. He was replaced by actor Thomas Ong. On 12 July 2007, the Immigration and Checkpoints Authority (ICA) completed its review on Lee's case and decided to allow him to retain his permanent resident (PR) status in Singapore. After the conviction, he made his comeback in the 2008 television drama Rhythm of Life.

In 2022, Lee revealed that he obtained Singapore citizenship "a few years ago".

== Filmography ==
=== Television series ===
Year	Title	Role	Notes	Ref.
1996	Kungfu Master	Liu Nianrong		
1996	Of Cops and Man	Liu Jiashun		
1996	Brave New World	Jiale		
1997	The Choice Partner	Zheng Fangsheng		
1997	My Wife, Your Wife, Their Wives	Mai Jiawei		
1997	The Price of Peace	Xie Guomin		
1997	The Guest People	Zhang Chongzhi		
1998	The Return of the Condor Heroes	Yang Guo		
1998	Myths and Legends of Singapore	Zhu Heyi / Zhu Gutou		
1999	Coup de Scorpio	Xie Tingzhang		
1999	Riding the Storm	Zhong Qingtang		
2000	Master Swordsman Lu Xiaofeng	Ximen Chuixue		
2000	Looking for Stars	Henry		
2001	Madam White Snake	Xu Xian / Xu Shilin		
2001	Master Swordsman Lu Xiaofeng 2	Ximen Chuixue		
2001	The Hotel	Shaun		
2002	Brotherhood	He Ping		
2002	Palm of Rulai	Lu Xiaoyu		
2003	Moon Fairy	Houyi		
2003	True Heroes	Chen Junhao		
2003	Always on My Mind	Tang Xinyang		
2004	Timeless Gift	Wang Jie		
2004	To Mum with Love	Yang Yijie		
2005	You Are the One	Simon		
2005	A New Life	Zhang Youfu		
2005	The Dragon Heroes	Yan Cheng		
2006	The Lucky Stars	Wu Fuqi		
2006	Rhapsody in Blue	Lan Ziyuan		
2006	Through It All	Guo Yihai		
2006	Fairy of the Chalice	Cao Jing		
2007	The Peak	Fang Hong'an		
2007	A Mobile Love Story	Lin Lizhong		
2008	Rhythm of Life	Li Junjie		
2008	Beach.Ball.Babes (球爱大战)	Ma Tianwu		
2008	The Shaolin Warriors	Qi Jiguang		
2009	My Buddy	Zeng Youquan		
2010	Breakout	Situ Dongcheng		
2011	Secrets for Sale	Zheng Renyi		
2011	The Oath	Wu Guo En		
2012	Show Hand	Zhang Qiming	Won Best Actor at Star Awards 2013	
2012	Game Plan	Zeng Haoren		
2013	A Good Wife	Li Shaowen	Won Best Leading Actor at Golden Bell Awards	
2014	Against The Tide	Di Shen		
2014	The Romance of the Condor Heroes	Huang Yaoshi		
2014	Mr. Right Wanted	Lun Zheming		
2015	Crescendo	Yang Yiwei		
2016	Nie Xiaoqian	Yan Qi		
2016	Nie Xiaoqian	Yan Chi Xia		
2018	Memories of Love	Xin Kai Yu		
2018	Doppelganger	Yang Liwei		
2018	Doppelganger	Li Ruiming		
2019	My Girlfriend is an Alien	Fang Shida		
2019	After The Stars (攻星计)	Le Jun		
2019	Dive	Ming Ke		
2020	Workers	Lin Mingqi		
2021	Danger Zone	Tan Chonghui	Won Best Supporting Actor at Golden Bell Awards	
2023	Port of Lies	Tong Baoju		
2024	Kill Sera Sera			
2024	Q18	Professor Ko		
2026	Haunted House Secrets	Tseng Kuo-hsiung		

=== Film ===
Year	Title	Role	Notes	Ref.
1995	Love Knows No Bounds	Hong Jie	Television film	
2004	The Best Bet	Lee Yong Shun		
2009	The Wedding Game	Jack Fang		
2010	Kidnapper	Ah Huat		
2012	Forgotten	Luo Pin-Chung	Television film	
2012	Sweetheart Chocolate			
2014	Black and White Episode 2: The Dawn of Justice			
2014	Filial Party	Peh Ah Beng		
2014	When a Peking Family Meets Aupair	Reporter		
2014	Who Is Undercover			
2017	The Fortune Handbook	Soh Hock		
2017	All My Goddess	Gary		
2017	The Long Goodbye	Lee Yu Cheng		
2017	Who Killed Cock Robin?			
2019	Wet Season	Andrew		
2019	Fall in Love at First Kiss	Mr Jiang		
2019	If Thoughts Can Kill			
2021	The Soul	Wan Yufan		
2023	Workers The Movie	Lin Mingqi		

=== Variety show hosting ===
Year	Title	Notes	Ref.
2001	Travel Hunt		
2006	Insiders' Australia		
2008	Life Transformers		
2010	Life Transformers 2		
2011	The Adventures of Chris		
2019	Star Search (season 11)	Mentor	
2022	Dishing With Chris Lee		

=== Music video appearances ===
Year	Artiste	Song title	Notes
2019	JJ Lin	"The Right Time"	
2021	Stefanie Sun	"What Remains"	

== Discography ==
=== Studio albums ===
- Christopher Lee Story (1999)
- Love, No Boundaries (2002)

=== Singles ===
Year	Title	Notes
1997	错爱今生	Theme song from The Choice Partner
1997	和平的代价	Theme song from The Price of Peace
1997	流浪之歌	Theme song from The Guest People
1998	一生太短暂	Insert song from The Return of the Condor Heroes
1999	逃避	Opening theme song from Coup de Scorpio
1999	不告而别	Ending theme song from Coup de Scorpio
2000	义	Ending theme song from Master Swordsman Lu Xiaofeng
2002	平凡	Theme song from Brotherhood
2002	爱，无国界	
2003	英雄好汉	Opening theme song from True Heroes
2003	每一天的思念	Insert song from True Heroes
2003	在你左右	Ending theme song from True Heroes
2004	非一般烦恼	Theme song from To Mum with Love
2005	相信	Theme song from You Are the One
2005	福禄寿	Theme song from My Lucky Stars; performed together with Fann Wong
?	万年红	Chinese New Year song - performed together with Fann Wong
2007	恭喜恭喜07	Chinese New Year song - performed together with Qi Yuwu, Ann Kok and Dawn Yeoh
2008	事如意08	Chinese New Year song
?	运气-阳光系列3	
?	谈何容易	

=== Compilation albums ===
Year	English title	Mandarin title
2007	Mediacorp Lunar New Year Album 07	群星贺岁金猪庆丰圆
2008	Mediacorp Lunar New Year Album Compilation 08	群星贺岁福牛迎瑞年
2012	MediaCorp Music Lunar New Year Album 12	新传媒群星金龙接财神

== Awards and nominations ==
Year	Award	Category	Nominated work	Result	Ref.
1996	Star Awards	Best Newcomer	—N/a	Nominated	
1997	Star Awards	Best Actor	The Price of Peace	Won	
1997	Star Awards	Top 10 Most Popular Male Artistes	—N/a	Won	
1998	Star Awards	Best Actor	The Return of the Condor Heroes	Nominated	
1998	Star Awards	Top 10 Most Popular Male Artistes	—N/a	Won	
1999	Star Awards	Best Actor	Riding The Storm	Nominated	
1999	Star Awards	Top 10 Most Popular Male Artistes	—N/a	Nominated	
2000	Star Awards	Best Actor	Coup de Scorpio	Nominated	
2000	Star Awards	Top 10 Most Popular Male Artistes	—N/a	Won	
2001	Star Awards	Best Actor	Looking for Stars	Nominated	
2001	Star Awards	Top 10 Most Popular Male Artistes	—N/a	Nominated	
2002	Star Awards	Top 10 Most Popular Male Artistes	—N/a	Won	
2003	Star Awards	Best Actor	True Heroes	Nominated	
2003	Star Awards	Top 10 Most Popular Male Artistes	—N/a	Won	
2004	Star Awards	Best Actor	Timeless Gift	Nominated	
2004	Star Awards	Top 10 Most Popular Male Artistes	—N/a	Won	
2005	Star Awards	Best Actor	A New Life	Nominated	
2005	Star Awards	Top 10 Most Popular Male Artistes	—N/a	Won	
2006	Star Awards	Top 10 Most Popular Male Artistes	—N/a	Won	
2007	Star Awards	Top 10 Most Popular Male Artistes	—N/a	Won	
2009	Star Awards	Best Variety Show Host	Life Transformers	Nominated	
2009	Star Awards	Top 10 Most Popular Male Artistes	—N/a	Won	
2010	Star Awards	All-Time Favourite Artiste	—N/a	Won	
2011	Star Awards	Best Actor	Breakout	Nominated	
2011	Star Awards	Favourite Onscreen Couple (Drama) [with Jeanette Aw]	Breakout	Won	
2011	Star Awards	Favourite Onscreen Partner (Variety)	Life Transformers 2	Won	
2011	Asian Television Awards	Best Actor in a Leading Role	Breakout	Nominated	
2012	Star Awards	Best Actor	The Oath	Nominated	
2012	Star Awards	Best Info-Ed Programme Host	The Adventures of Chris	Nominated	
2012	Star Awards	Favourite Male Character	The Oath	Nominated	
2012	Star Awards	Favourite Onscreen Couple (Drama) [with Jesseca Liu]	The Oath	Nominated	
2012	Golden Bell Awards	Best Leading Actor in a Television Series	Forgotten	Nominated	
2013	Star Awards	Best Actor	Show Hand	Won	
2013	Star Awards	Favourite Male Character	Game Plan	Nominated	
2013	Star Awards	Favourite Onscreen Couple (Drama) [with Jesseca Liu]	Game Plan	Nominated	
2014	Star Awards	Star Awards for Most Popular Regional Artiste (China)	—N/a	Nominated	
2014	Star Awards	Star Awards for Most Popular Regional Artiste (Malaysia)	—N/a	Nominated	
2014	Star Awards	Star Awards for Most Popular Regional Artiste (Cambodia)	—N/a	Nominated	
2014	Golden Bell Awards	Best Leading Actor in a Television Series	A Good Wife	Won	
2015	Star Awards	Best Actor	Against The Tide	Nominated	
2015	Star Awards	Most Popular Regional Artiste (China)	—N/a	Won	
2015	Asian Television Awards	Best Actor in a Leading Role	Against The Tide	Nominated	
2016	Star Awards	Best Actor	Crescendo	Nominated	
2016	Star Awards	Favourite Male Character	Crescendo	Nominated	
2016	Asian Television Awards	Best Actor in a Leading Role	Crescendo	Nominated	
2017	Golden Bell Awards	Best Leading Actor in a Miniseries or Television Film	The Long Goodbye	Nominated	
2019	Star Awards	Best Actor	Doppelganger	Nominated	
2021	Golden Bell Awards	Best Leading Actor in a Miniseries or Television Film	Workers	Won	
2022	Golden Bell Awards	Best Supporting Actor in a Television Series	Danger Zone	Won	
2023	Star Awards	Best Programme Host	Dishing With Chris Lee	Won	
2025	Star Awards	Best Programme Host	Dishing With Chris Lee S2	Won	
2025	Star Awards	Best Actor	Kill Sera Sera	Won	
2025	Star Awards	Special Achievement Award	—N/a	Won	
