= When I Fall in Love... with Both =

2000 Hong Kong film by Samson Chiu

- Film poster
- Directed by: Samson Chiu
- Written by: Samson Chiu; Siu Kwan-Hung
- Produced by: Derek Yee
- Starring: Michelle Reis; Theresa Lee; Fann Wong
- Cinematography: Tang Hong-Bong
- Edited by: Cheung Ka-Fai
- Music by: Chiu Tsang-Hei; Lam Chi-Yeung
- Distributed by: Golden Harvest Pictures (China) Ltd. Film Unlimited
- Release date: 1 April 2000
- Running time: 115 minutes
- Country: Hong Kong
- Language: Cantonese

When I Fall in Love... with Both (Chinese: 月亮的秘密; pinyin: Yuèliàng de Mìmì) is a 2000 Hong Kong anthology film consisting of three separate stories. Directed by Samson Chiu, the film stars Hong Kong actresses Michelle Reis and Theresa Lee together with Singaporean actress Fann Wong.

== Cast (in order of appearance) ==
Cast	Role
Fann Wong	Joy
James Lye	Chi Sing
Peter Ho	Sam
Theresa Lee	Cherry
James Chan	Zhiwu
Sean Chan	Zhiwen
Michelle Reis	Cece
Alex Fong Chung-Sun	Nam
David Wu	Tung
Law Kar-ying	

== Plot summary ==
This feminist Hong Kong film comprises three separate stories telling of the predicament of modern women when they have more than one choice of a partner. In Singapore, Fann Wong is a reporter who falls for a shy baker (Peter Ho Yun-Tung) while she's seeing her suave co-worker (James Lye). Meanwhile, in Hong Kong, Theresa Lee is about to marry, but falls for her fiancé's twin brother (the two are played by twins James Chan and Sean Chan). And finally, in Macau, Michelle Reis is stuck between Alex Fong and David Wu, though not in the same way the other two women are.

== Production notes ==
- The film cost HKD$3 million to produce and film.
- The Hong Kong story was shot first, followed by the Macau story, and lastly, the Singapore story.
- While the Hong Kong and Macau stories were filmed using Cantonese dialogue, the actors in the Singapore story relied on Mandarin dialogue.
- In the final scene, Fann Wong and Theresa Lee meet up with David Wu in Macau. The filming of that scene took three days.
