= The Truth About Jane and Sam =

1999 Hong Kong film by Derek Yee

The Truth About Jane and Sam 真心話
- Theatrical poster for The Truth About Jane and Sam.
- Directed by: Derek Yee
- Written by: Derek Yee
- Produced by: Catherine Hun
- Starring: Fann Wong; Peter Ho; Cheng Pei-pei; Chin Kar-lok; Joe Cheung; Wei Wei; James Lye
- Cinematography: Feng Feng-Zhen; Keung Kwok-Man
- Edited by: Kwong Chi-Leung
- Music by: Ken Lim; Zhang Renshu; Li Min; Dawn Lim
- Production companies: Film Unlimited; Raintree Pictures
- Release dates: 8 July 1999 (Singapore); 20 July 1999 (Hong Kong)
- Running time: 100 minutes
- Countries: Hong Kong; Singapore
- Languages: English; Mandarin; Cantonese
- Budget: US$1 million

The Truth About Jane and Sam (Chinese: 真心話; Simplified Chinese: 真心话) is a 1999 Hong Kong film co-produced by Hong Kong's Film Unlimited and Singapore's Raintree Pictures. Directed by Hong Kong director Derek Yee, the movie stars Singapore actress Fann Wong and Taiwanese male singer Peter Ho.

== Plot ==
The main character, Sam, decided to work in Hong Kong after graduating from school in Singapore, as a way to gain a wider exposure in life It was in Hong Kong when he encountered Jane at a movie theater, by chance. Following the encounter, Sam's fascination for Jane led him to discover a lifestyle that is, until now, unknown to him.

== Cast ==
Cast	Role
Fann Wong	Jane
Peter Ho	Sam
Cheng Pei-pei	Sam's mother
Chin Kar-lok	Jane's brother
Joe Cheung	Sam's father
Wei Wei	Jane's grandmother
James Lye	The man in the pet shop
Deborah Sim	The ice-cream seller
Yat Ning Chan	

== Box office ==
- The film grossed SGD$78,261 in Singapore on the sneak preview weekend, making it the top film of the weekend, a rarity for a Hong Kong film in Singapore. (Hong Kong films have suffered declining cinema attendance rates since the mid-90s.) The media widely attributed it to the presence of Fann Wong, a leading Singaporean actress, in the lead role.
- At the end of its five-week run in Singapore, it had grossed SGD$1,057,318 - making it the top Hong Kong film of the year in Singapore.
- In Hong Kong, the film grossed over HKD$5 million.

== See also ==
- List of Hong Kong films

== Nominations ==
- 19th Hong Kong Film Awards Best New Performer Award (Fann Wong)
