= Fann Wong =

Singaporean actress (born 1971)

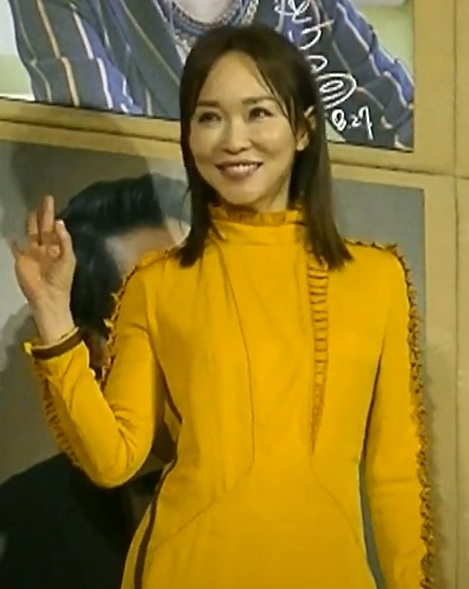
- Fann in August 2019
- Born: Fann Woon Fong (范文芳); 27 January 1971 (age 55); Singapore
- Education: LaSalle International Fashion School
- Occupations: Actress; singer; businesswoman; model
- Years active: 1988–present
- Agents: Huayi Brothers; Catwalk Production House
- Spouse: Christopher Lee (m. 2009)
- Children: 1
- Parents: Fann Chin Khew (father); Wong Siew Toy (mother)
- Awards: Full list
- Musical career
- Genre: Mandopop
- Instrument: Vocals

Chinese name
- Traditional Chinese: 范雯芳
- Simplified Chinese: 范文芳
- Hanyu Pinyin: Fàn Wénfāng
- Pha̍k-fa-sṳ: Fam Vùn-fông
- Jyutping: Faan6 Man4 Fong1
- Hokkien POJ: Hoān Bûn-hong
- Tâi-lô: Huān Bûn-hong

Fann Woon Fong (born 27 January 1971), known professionally as Fann Wong, is a Singaporean actress, singer, businesswoman and model. She has been referred to as one of MediaCorp's Ah Jie for being one of the most successful actresses from Singapore.

At the local Star Awards 1995, Fann became the first actress to snag three prominent awards in the same year: Best Actress, Best Newcomer and Top 5 Most Popular Female Artiste. After gaining regional exposure and popularity in Asia through film and television productions, she became the first Singaporean actress to break into Hollywood, playing Chon Lin in the 2003 film Shanghai Knights. She married actor Christopher Lee on 29 September 2009.

In a career spanning over three decades, Fann's accolades include the Star Awards for Best Actress, Star Awards for All-Time Favourite Artiste, Huading Awards as well as nominations for Hong Kong Film Awards and MTV Movie Awards.

== Early life ==
Born in Singapore to Hakka tailor parents, Fann Chin Khew and Wong Siew Toy, Fann Wong would later derive her English stage name from her parents' surnames. Fann has three siblings — an older sister, as well as a younger brother and a younger sister named Fan Wen Qing (former child actress). She was educated at Temasek Secondary School, where she took her GCE 'O' Level examinations in 1987.

Fann was a child actor while in primary school and featured in several SBC children's programmes. At the age of 16, she won a beauty contest organised by Her World, a Singapore fashion magazine. She started a successful modelling career in Singapore, and spent the next two years modelling part-time while taking her GCE 'A' Level examinations at a private school. She subsequently earned a diploma in fashion merchandising from LaSalle International Fashion School in Singapore.

== Career ==
Fann moved to Taiwan in 1993. One of her earliest successes was in an Oil of Ulan (now Oil of Olay) commercial aired in Taiwan and Singapore. The following year, a Singaporean television producer discovered her and cast her in Dreams Come True, a Singapore drama series. Fann soon starred in two more Singapore television series, The Challenger and Chronicle of Life.

After a year in the Singapore television industry, her role in Chronicle of Life won her Best Actress and Best Newcomer awards at Singapore's 1995 Star Awards. In 1996, her role in The Unbroken Cycle won her first regional nomination at the Asian Television Awards. She continued to star in a large array of drama serials, including A Romance in Shanghai (produced in Shanghai), Wild Orchids (filmed in Sydney) and Brave New World (filmed in Amsterdam and Belgium).

In late 1996, Fann released in Singapore her first Mandarin pop album Fanntasy, which contained a duet (theme song of her TV drama 'Brave New World') with Taiwanese singer Jeff Chang. The album was retitled I Live Alone and repackaged with two additional songs for the Taiwanese market and won 4 IFPI platinum sales awards in Taiwan, marking the start of Fann's regional success.

=== Late 1990s: rise of regional popularity ===
In 1996, Fann starred in the 40-episode blockbuster drama Brave New World alongside Christopher Lee and Hong Kong actor Alex Man. This was the first time ever that Fann would act together with Christopher Lee. Fann also performed the theme song, "Don't let love become hard for us", as a duet with Taiwanese singer Jeff Chang.

In 1998, Fann was named the female lead, Xiaolongnü, in TCS remake of the hit wuxia drama The Return of the Condor Heroes where she once again starred alongside Christopher Lee. The release of this drama, along with her second album, Shopping, further increased her exposure in Taiwan and China. When Hong Kong director Derek Yee saw Fann's "Shopping" music video on Hong Kong's Channel V, he flew to Singapore to cast her as the lead actress in the Hong Kong art film The Truth About Jane and Sam. The movie topped the Singapore box office for three weeks and her role as a gritty wild-child won her a Best New Performer nomination at the 19th Hong Kong Film Awards in 2000. In addition, her role as a self-centred stockbroker in Out to Win attracted a million viewers in Singapore during its finale. It was during this period when Fann acquired many of her die-hard fans, led by the Fann-atic Fan Club (FFC).

In 1999, Fann released her third album, Missing You, recorded "Private Number" with British boyband 911 and performed Moments of Magic, Singapore's official millennium song. These musical successes resulted in her being the first Singapore artiste to stage a solo paying concert ("My Story"—Fann Wong in Concert) at the Singapore Indoor Stadium in 2000. That same year, she released her fourth Mandarin album, No Problem.

During the next few years, Fann focused on her acting career. She played a two-timing television reporter in the omnibus Hong Kong film When I Fall in Love... With Both, acted as a lovelorn insurance agent in the Singaporean romantic drama Looking For Stars, as well as played the title character in the Taiwanese period drama Madam White Snake. She also began hosting travelogue shows, including Travel Hunt: Japan and Fann Adventure, which was filmed in South Africa and Malaysia.

=== 2003: Hollywood ===
In 2002, Fann became the first Singaporean actress to play a major role in a Hollywood production, as Chon Lin in Shanghai Knights. When the film was released in early 2003, Stephen Hunter of The Washington Post stated:

Fann is an enchanting new film presence. Clearly modelled after Zhang Ziyi of Crouching Tiger, Hidden Dragon, she combines a dancer's grace with a fighter's speed, and looks great standing still or whirling.

The Hollywood Reporter's David Hunter noted that Fann was "more than equal to playing the strong woman fighter who's also pretty darn cute", while John Keenan of the Omaha World-Herald stated that "Fann's stunt work is actually more memorable than Jackie Chan's here". In Hong Kong, the South China Morning Post stated that she "seems set to displace Lucy Liu as Hollywood's Asian babe du jour". She was subsequently nominated under the Best Fight category in MTV Movie Awards 2003, and in 2004, won the Singapore Street Festival's Best International Artiste Award.

=== 2004–2007 ===
In 2004, Fann continued acting in China period dramas such as Moon Fairy and My Fair Lady. She also starred in a Singapore serial on the SARS epidemic titled Always on My Mind, which won her a Best Actress nomination at the 2004 Star Awards. In mid-2004, Fann was cast in the lead role in the German-Singapore telemovie, House of Harmony. In late 2004, Fann released her first publication, a semi-autobiographical comic book Girl Illustrated. After a musical hiatus of five years, she released her first compilation, In Love With You.

In April 2005, Fann was invited to the Cannes MIPTV Media Market where she promoted House of Harmony and discussed possible collaborations with European industry professionals. She obtained the All-Time Favourite Artiste, after obtaining the Top 10 Most Popular Female Artistes for ten consecutive years. House of Harmony has since been telecast in Germany, Austria, France and Belgium to a combined prime-time viewership of over 80 million. That same year, Fann took on a lead role in a Taiwanese art-house romance film, Dragon Eye Congee, which was nominated for five categories at the inaugural Asian Festival of First Films.

In August 2005, she made her voiceover debut in Singapore's first 3D animation film, Zodiac, The Race Begins, which was released in early 2006. Furthermore, she also contributed her songs for the soundtracks of the movie. In November 2006, Fann made her first promotional visit to Phnom Penh, Cambodia. She performed at the Tonle Sap Water Festival Mega Concert and visited the Krousar Thmey blind school, where she donated cassette recorders and biscuits.

=== 2007–2012: Focus on the Chinese market ===
In early 2007, Fann signed a management contract with China's Huayi Brothers. Fann also became the first Singaporean artist to release a self-illustrated 3D animation, titled Fanntasy World. The release of her Singapore film Just Follow Law, in which she had to play an uncouth and scruffy man in a woman's body, was a major attraction at the Chinese New Year box office and won her critical acclaim in the Singapore and Malaysian media.

In 2008, she was invited to be a judge at the sixth "spirit of fire" international film festival which was held in Russia. Ah Long Pte Ltd reached No. 1 in both Singapore's and Malaysia's box office during the Chinese new year. Later, the film Dance of Dragon that she paired with Korean hunk Jang Hyuk led her to win her first International Best Actress at West Hollywood International Film Festival.

In 2009, Fann starred with future husband Christopher Lee in The Wedding Game. The movie won the best feature film at the first international comedy film festival held in Thailand. In June, she finished her new Chinese movie In a tangle . In September, she filmed the romantic movie Cornflower blue, starring with Alex Fong and Chang Chen in Hainan. Both of them were on the screen in late 2010. She filmed another comedy film Happy Go Lucky, which was shown during the Chinese New Year.

In 2010, she slowed down her pace and only two dramas were filmed. But she gained her critic praises from many Chinese media for her character "Ren DaiDai" in the drama Jin DaBan De Zuihou Yiye starring with Chinese actress Fan Bingbing. Two more Singaporean dramas followed in 2011.

But 2012 seemed to be a busy year for Fann. At the begin of the year, she played a syren in the series The Legend of Master Ji 3, then she was invited to be a judge for TBS's fashion competition show Asian Ace. Later she flew to ShanDong and played a spicy wife in the movie Ai Shui Shui together with Jaycee Chan, and also a telemovie Han di hu lue zhu gui based on novel Water Margin. Another movie Runaway Woman was filmed in Xinjiang in May. She was awarded the "2012 Huading Most Popular Asian Actress Award" in Beijing Olympic Sports Centre on 4 July. Though she didn't release new album for years, she was still invited to perform at 9th Asia Song Festival which was held in Yeosul, Korea, on 4 August. In October, she flew to Xinjiang again to film the period drama Tun Shu Xi Jiang about revolution occurring in Xinjiang. She worked with Hong Kong actor Bowie Lam (her husband in the drama) and Chinese director Zhang Jizhong.

=== 2013-2014: New beginnings ===
2013 marked a new career beginning for Fann. She set up her own studio at the end of 2012, ended her contract with Huayi Brothers, and signed a new contract with Taiwan management agency Catwalk. In 2014, after working with Fann on a children's charity in Thailand, illustrator Patrick Yee designed and illustrated a nearly wordless picturebook, published by Epigram Books, about the adventures of a girl with the same name.

=== 2014–present: Focus on motherhood ===
After giving birth to her son Zed in 2014, Fann took a step back in her career to focus on motherhood, only taking on acting projects occasionally. In 2018, Fann made her acting comeback in Doppelganger, which marked her first on-screen collaboration with husband Christopher Lee in almost 14 years. The role scored her a nomination for Star Awards for Best Actress at Star Awards 2019.

In 2020, Fann made her Mediacorp English drama debut in the Hokkien opera themed series, Titoudao: Inspired by a True Wayang Star. That same year, Fann turned down an invitation from Zhang Ziyi to appear in the popular Chinese variety show, I Am the Actor. In 2023, Fann was in negotiations to appear in the fourth season of the popular Chinese reality TV show Sisters Who Make Waves. Fann ultimately did not appear in the show. In 2024, Fann was featured in a women-focused exhibition, Goddess: Brave. Bold. Beautiful, at the ArtScience Museum alongside Michelle Yeoh, Zhang Ziyi and Marilyn Monroe.

== Personal life ==
Fann has been romantically involved with Malaysian actor Christopher Lee since late 2002. They went public with their relationship in mid-2005. She had only one prior romance known to the public: an 11-year relationship with businessman Anthony Chan.

Fann and Lee have collaborated eight times in television productions and have played lovers in six of these. After publicly acknowledging their relationship in mid-2005, they were seldom seen together. However, in December 2006, they walked together hand-in-hand down the blue carpet of the 2006 Star Awards ceremony. The gesture was noted by the Singapore media as a rare public acknowledgement of their relationship.

In September 2008, it was rumoured she would be marrying Lee. They were married on 16 May 2009. Costing at S$5 million, their wedding was featured in an infotainment show called The Wedding (范心有李), which was hosted by Michelle Chong, Mark Lee, and Dennis Chew. On 9 August 2014, Fann gave birth to a son named Zed.

In July 2020, Fann alerted her fans to a scammer using her identity to get her fans' personal information. The scam asked fans to register their names on a website in order to receive a giveaway prize. On 5 July 2021, Fann's father died at the age of 81. On 13 October 2021, Fann opened her online pastry shop called Fanntasy. Fann's hobbies include illustrating comics, shopping, and eating.

== Discography ==
=== Studio albums ===
Date of release	Title (Chinese)	Title (English)
1996 October 6	–	Fanntasy
1997 September 12	一個人生活	I Live Alone
1998 July 8	逛街	Shopping
1999 June 2	想你	Missing You
2000 October 3	沒有問題	No Problem
2005 June 17	愛上了你	In Love With You

=== Singles ===
Date of release	Title (Chinese)	Title (English)
1999	–	"Private Number"
"1999 December"	–	"Moments Of Magic"
"2000 May"	文芳的故事 Commemorative CD	My Story In Concert Commemorative CD

=== Soundtrack appearances ===
Date of release	Title (Chinese)	Title (English)	Songs
1995 April	"金枕头电视原声带"	The Golden Pillow OST	"别以为我不懂"、"Just For Fun"
1998 May	"神雕侠侣电视原声带"	Return of the Condor Heroes OST	"缘聚缘散(预言)"、"玉女心经(示情)"、"缘聚缘散(预言)电视版"
1999 June	"真心话电影原声带"	The Truth About Jane and Sam OST	"爱就爱there is no why"、"逛街(粤语版")、"跟随"、"逛街(粤语版)Remix"、"爱就爱there is no why (Remix Version)"
2000 May	"笑傲江湖电视原声带"	The Legendary Swordsman OST	"豪情笑江湖"、"没有江湖哪有情"、"写梦(老唱机版)"、"独思"、"写梦"
2006 January	"生肖传奇电影原声带"	Zodiac: The Race Begins... OST	"寻梦"、I"n My Dreams"

=== Compilations ===
Date of release	Title (Chinese)	Title (English)	Songs Including
1995 April	新视红星歌影集	TCS ALL STAR Compilation	如何对你说
1996 June	晶粹	GEMS	真爱宣言
2000 November	阳光系列 IV	Morning Express IV	月亮的秘密
2001 April	阳光系列 V	Morning Express V	我相信、我来也匆匆去也匆匆
2002 July	阳光系列 VI	Morning Express VI	分享
2002	爱无国界	Love No Boundaries	看电视
2007 November	戏剧情牵25电视金典纪念珍藏版	Celebrating 25 Years of Chinese Drama Collector's Edition	我相信、豪情笑江湖、stay、分享、如何对你说、我来也匆匆去也匆匆、LUV LUV LUV、真爱宣言
2013 January	爱上主题曲	In Love With Drama Songs	向爱奔跑 (duet with 陈汉玮)、忙

=== Other songs ===
Date of release	Title	Info
1996	"牵动"	Episode song of drama 再见荧光兰
1998	"看电视"	Theme song of TCS Channel 8
1999	"Private Number"	Duet with 911
2001	"情"	Theme song of drama Madam White Snake
2003	"找到"	Charity song for SARS
2003	"明天还有更远的路程"	Theme song of drama Always on My Mind
2003	"忘不了你的眼睛"	Episode song of drama Always on My Mind
2003	"相聚"	Theme song of drama Moon Fairy
2005	"路"	Theme song of drama Beautiful Illusions
2007	"我有一个梦想"	Charity song

=== Video compilations ===
Date of release	Title (Chinese)	Title (English)
1997	一个人生活 Karaoke VCD	I Live Alone Karaoke VCD
1999 November	想你 Karaoke VCD	Missing You Karaoke VCD
2006	百代星光传集13范文芳没有问题精选 DVD	No Problem Compilation DVD

=== Concerts ===
- 2000: My Story – Fann Wong in Concert (Singapore Indoor Stadium)
- 2004: Friendship Melody Music Concert (Ho Chi Minh Indoor Stadium, Vietnam)
- 2006: Tonle Sap Water Festival Mega Concert (Phnom Penh, Cambodia)
- 2012: 9th Asia Song Festival (Korea)

== Publications ==
- 2000: In +he Mood (Hong Kong pictorial by William Cheung Suk Ping and Wing Shya) ISBN 981-04-3048-5
- 2004: Girl, Illustrated (personally-illustrated comic book) OCLC 60520589

== Awards and nominations ==
Year	Award	Category	Nominated work	Notes	Ref.
1988	Her World Magazine Cover Girl	—N/a	—N/a	Won	
1995	Star Awards	Best Actress	Chronicle Of Life (as Fang Ling)	Won	
1995	Star Awards	Best Newcomer	Chronicle Of Life (as Fang Ling)	Won	
1995	Star Awards	Top 5 Most Popular Female Artistes	—N/a	Won	
1996	Asian Television Awards	Best Actress	The Unbroken Cycle (as Ye Qin, Li Xiangmei, Zhu Zhiyue)	Nominated	
1996	Star Awards	Best Actress	The Unbroken Cycle (as Ye Qin, Li Xiangmei, Zhu Zhiyue)	Nominated	
1996	Star Awards	Top 5 Most Popular Female Artistes	—N/a	Won	
1996	Singapore Hit Awards	Media Recommendation Award	Local Singer	Nominated	
1997	Star Awards	Best Actress	The Matchmaker's Match (as Xiang-Gu)	Nominated	
1997	Star Awards	Top 10 Most Popular Female Artistes	—N/a	Won	
1997	Star Awards	Best Theme Song	"别让情两难" Brave New World's theme song	Nominated	
1998	Star Awards	Best Actress	The Return of the Condor Heroes (as Xiao Long Nu)	Nominated	
1998	Star Awards	Top 10 Most Popular Female Artistes	—N/a	Won	
1998	YES 933 Hit Awards	Most Popular Local Singer	—N/a	Won	
1999	Star Awards	Best Actress	Out To Win (as Zhang Wenhua Coco)	Nominated	
1999	Star Awards	Top 10 Most Popular Female Artistes	—N/a	Won	
1999	Star Awards	Best Theme Song	Out to Win 《LUV 3》	Nominated	
2000	Star Awards	Special Achievement Award	—N/a	Won	
2000	Star Awards	Best Actress	The Legendary Swordsman (as Ren Yingying)	Nominated	
2000	Star Awards	Top 10 Most Popular Female Artistes	—N/a	Won	
2000	Singapore Hit Awards	Most Popular Female Singer	—N/a	Won	
2000	Hong Kong Film Awards	Best New Performer	The Truth About Jane and Sam	Nominated	
2001	Star Awards	Best Actress	Heroes in Black (as Liu Feiyan)	Nominated	
2001	Star Awards	Best Theme Song	Heroes in Black 《我来也匆匆去也匆匆》	Nominated	
2001	Star Awards	Top 10 Most Popular Female Artistes	—N/a	Won	
2002	Star Awards	Top 10 Most Popular Female Artistes	—N/a	Won	
2003	Star Awards	Top 10 Most Popular Female Artistes	—N/a	Won	
2003	MTV Movie Awards	Best Fight	Shanghai Knights	Nominated	
2003	Singapore Fashion Awards	Celebrity Style Award	—N/a	Won	
2004	Singapore Street Festival	Best International Artiste	—N/a	Won	
2004	Star Awards	Best Actress	Always on My Mind (as Guan Sija)	Nominated	
2004	Star Awards	Best Theme Song	"明天还有更远的路" (Always on My Mind's theme song)	Nominated	
2004	Star Awards	Top 10 Most Popular Female Artistes	—N/a	Won	
2005	Star Awards	All-Time Favourite Artiste	—N/a	Won	
2005	Star Awards	Best Actress	Beautiful Illusions (as Wang Yixin Joe-ann)	Nominated	
2005	Star Awards	Best Theme Song	"下一秒钟" (Beautiful Illusions' theme song)	Nominated	
2006	Star Awards	Best Actress	Women Of Times (as Wang Yixi)	Nominated	
2007	China	White Lotus Award	Popularity Award	Won	
2008	West Hollywood International Film Festival	Best Actress	Dance of the Dragon	Won	
2009	Star Awards	Best Actress	The Defining Moment (as Lin Kexin)	Nominated	
2009	Asian Television Awards	Best Actress	The Defining Moment (as Lin Kexin)	Nominated	
2010	Star Awards	Favourite Female Character	The Ultimatum	Nominated	
2012	Star Awards	Best Actress	On The Fringe 2 (as Liu Jiali)	Nominated (Note: Shared with Li Nanxing.)	
2012	Star Awards	Favourite Onscreen Couple (Drama)	On The Fringe 2	Nominated	
2012	Star Awards	Favourite Variety Show Host	—N/a	Nominated	
2013	Asian Song Festival	Best Asian Artist	—N/a	Won	
2013	Huading Awards	Most Popular Asian Actress	—N/a	Won	
2019	Star Awards	Best Actress	Doppelganger (as Wang Siting)	Nominated	
