= Lim Bo Seng =

Chinese resistance fighter (1909–1944)

- 林謀盛
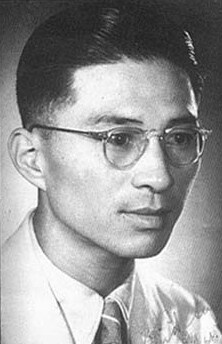
- Lim c. 1930
- Born: 27 April 1909; Houpu Village, Meilin Town, Nan'an, Fujian, China
- Died: 29 June 1944 (aged 35); Batu Gajah Prison, Perak, Japanese-occupied Malaya
- Burial place: Lim Bo Seng Memorial Tomb, MacRitchie Reservoir Park, Singapore; 1°20′31.76″N 103°49′50.6″E
- Other name: Tan Choon Lim
- Alma mater: Raffles Institution and Anglo-Chinese School; University of Hong Kong (BBA)
- Spouse: Gan Choo Neo (m. 1930–1944)
- Children: 4 sons and 4 daughters
- Relatives: Lim Loh (father); Png Bor Tan (mother); Lim Teck Yin (grandson)
- Military career
- Allegiance: Singapore; Allied forces
- Branch: British Indian Army; Special Operations Executive
- Service years: 1942–1944
- Rank: Major-General (awarded posthumously by the Republic of China); Colonel (British Indian Army)
- Unit: Force 136
- Conflicts: World War II; Pacific War (1941–1945); Malayan campaign †
- Memorials: Lim Bo Seng Memorial, Esplanade Park

Chinese name
- Traditional Chinese: 林謀盛
- Simplified Chinese: 林谋盛
Transcriptions
Standard Mandarin
- Hanyu Pinyin: Lín Móushèng
Southern Min
- Hokkien POJ: Lîm Bô͘-sēng

Lim Bo Seng (Chinese: 林谋盛; Pe̍h-ōe-jī: Lîm Bô͘-sēng; pinyin: Lín Móushèng; 27 April 1909 – 29 June 1944) was a resistance fighter who played a crucial role in the anti-Japanese fund raising and movement in Singapore and Malaya during World War II. Born in Fujian, China, he moved to Singapore at a young age and was educated at Raffles Institution (RI) before pursuing engineering at the University of Hong Kong. Following his studies, he returned to manage his family's business ventures and emerged as a respected leader within the overseas Chinese community in Southeast Asia. With the outbreak of the Second Sino-Japanese War in 1937, Lim became deeply involved in patriotic and civic efforts, spearheading boycott campaigns against Japanese goods and raising funds in support of China's war resistance.

Following the fall of Singapore to the Japanese in 1942, Lim fled to the British-controlled territories in India where he was recruited into Force 136, a covert guerrilla task force under the direction of the Special Operations Executive (SOE). Force 136 was formed to carry out espionage, sabotage and reconnaissance operations in Japanese-occupied Southeast Asia. Lim underwent military and intelligence training before being deployed back to Malaya as part of Operation Gustavus, which aimed to establish a spy network and coordinate with local resistance groups. Despite the formidable risks, Lim remained committed to the mission, operating under severe conditions while evading Japanese detection. His efforts contributed to the broader Allied intelligence strategy in the region though the threat of betrayal and capture loomed constantly.

In 1944, Lim was arrested by Japanese forces in Malaya after a fellow operative was captured and tortured into revealing information. Refusing to divulge any details of Force 136's operations, Lim endured prolonged torture and ultimately died in prison on 29 June 1944 due to severe ill-treatment under the Japanese. His body was later returned to Singapore after the war, where he was buried with full military honours near MacRitchie Reservoir. Lim is commemorated as a national war hero in the country, and his sacrifice remains an enduring symbol of courage and patriotism in Singaporean memory.

== Family background and early life ==
Lim was born in Houpu Village, Meilin Town, Nan'an County, Fujian Province (now Manshanhong Village, Shengxin Town, Nan'an, Fujian). His father, Lim Loh (Chinese: 林路; Pe̍h-ōe-jī: Lîm Lō͘; pinyin: Lín Lù; 1852–1929), owned businesses in various industries, including construction, rubber, brick manufacturing and biscuit production, as well as properties in China and Southeast Asia. Lim Loh had six wives and a total of 19 sons and nine daughters; his first ten sons and first two daughters were adopted by his first four wives, while his fifth wife bore him seven sons and six daughters, and his sixth wife bore him two sons and a daughter. Lim Bo Seng was born to Lim Loh's fifth wife Png Bor Tan (Chinese: 方牡丹; Pe̍h-ōe-jī: Png Bó͘-tan; pinyin: Fāng Mǔdān; 1885–1930) and he was Lim Loh's 11th son but the first biological son in the family.

Lim initially attended an English school (now part of the Fujian Xiamen No. 2 Middle School) in Gulangyu, Xiamen before he moved to Singapore at the age of 16 and studied at Raffles Institution. According to an oral interview conducted by the National Archives of Singapore with his brother Lim Bo Yam, Lim Bo Yam shared that Lim Bo Seng shifted to Anglo-Chinese School after Standard Seven and studied at ACS which was located at Cairnhill. In the Malaya Tribune (9 April 1928), it stated the Lim Bo Seng passed his Senior Cambridge Examination while studying at ACS. After graduating, he went on to pursue a degree in business at the University of Hong Kong.

== As a businessman ==
After his father died in 1929, Lim inherited the family businesses and continued running them with his brothers. He was also very active in the overseas Chinese business community in Singapore and Malaya, and had held key positions such as Chairman of the Singapore Building Industry Association, Board Member of the Singapore Chinese Chamber of Commerce and Industry, and Executive Member and Education Director of the Singapore Hokkien Association.

== Anti-Japanese activism ==
On the Double Tenth Day in 1938, Tan Kah Kee and other Chinese business leaders in Singapore established a committee to raise funds to help Chinese refugees affected by the Second Sino-Japanese War. Lim served as the committee's communications director and actively participated in anti-Japanese activities such as boycotting Japanese goods and fund-raising to support the war effort in China.

Towards the end of 1937, hundreds of overseas Chinese working in Japanese-owned industries in Malaya went on strike. At the time, the Japanese government owned an iron mine in Bukit Besi near Dungun, Terengganu, where about 3,000 workers were employed. The iron ore was shipped to Japan and used as raw material to manufacture weapons. Lim believed that if the workers in the Dungun mine went on strike, the Japanese would suffer a huge loss, so he planned to make the workers go on strike. Around February 1938, Lim travelled to Dungun with Chuang Hui Chuan (Chinese: 莊惠泉; Pe̍h-ōe-jī: Chng Hūi-choân; pinyin: Zhuāng Huìquán) of the Anxi clan association to carry out their plan. Chuang went to the mine to persuade the workers to go on strike while Lim contacted the local police and gained their support. By early March, Lim and Chuang achieved success as many workers left the mine and followed them to Singapore. On 11 March 1938, Lim and the Singaporean Chinese community held a welcoming ceremony for the workers, who later resettled and found employment in Singapore.

In December 1941, Lim responded to the British colonial government's call to mobilise Chinese volunteers to join Dalforce (part of the Straits Settlements Volunteer Force) and assist the British in resisting the invading Japanese forces. The volunteers put up a fierce fight against the Japanese during the Battle of Singapore in February 1942.

== Life in Force 136 ==
On 11 February 1942, Lim left Singapore for Sumatra and later travelled by sea to Calcutta, India before taking a flight to Chongqing, where the Chinese government was based during the war. The Chinese government sent him to India to assist the British military forces in logistical operations such as firefighting, medical support and supply transportation. Later, as part of the Allied cooperation between China and Britain, Lim was designated as the Chinese liaison of Force 136, a Sino-British guerrilla task force, and appointed as Force 136's Malaya operations officer with the rank of colonel. Force 136 agents were trained by the British at Sinhagad, Poona, India.

=== Operation Gustavus ===
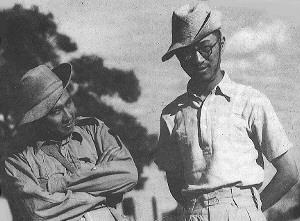
Tan Chong Tee and Lim (right)

Operation Gustavus was aimed at establishing an espionage network in Malaya and Singapore to gather intelligence on Japanese activities, and thereby aid the British in Operation Zipper – the code name for their plan to take back Singapore from the Japanese.

On 24 May 1943, the first group of Force 136 agents, codenamed "Gustavus I" and led by Captain John Davis of the Special Operations Executive, departed the British naval base in Ceylon on board the Dutch submarine O 24 and arrived in Perak, Malaya. The O 24 would rendezvous with "Gustavus I" again in September and November 1943 to transfer supplies and personnel from "Gustavus IV" and "Gustavus V" respectively. Its sister ship, the O 23 under Captain Richard Broome, transported "Gustavus II" and "Gustavus III" to Malaya on 25 June and 4 August 1943 respectively. Lim arrived in Perak on 2 November 1943 as part of "Gustavus V". He travelled under the alias "Tan Choon Lim" (Chinese: 陳春林; Pe̍h-ōe-jī: Tân Chhun-lîm; pinyin: Chén Chūnlín) to avoid identification and claimed to be a businessman when he passed through checkpoints.

In Perak, Davis and Lim re-established contact with Major Freddie Chapman, who was part of a British unit that stayed behind after the Malayan Campaign and had been carrying out small-scale attacks against the Japanese in Malaya. They also met guerrilla fighters of the Malayan People's Anti-Japanese Army (MPAJA), including the Malayan communists Chin Peng and Lai Teck. They reached an agreement that the resistance group would be placed under British command in exchange for weapons, supplies and training. Force 136's head office and command centre was established on a hill in Bidor. One of the Chinese provision shops in Ipoh, Jian Yik Jan (Chinese: 建益棧; pinyin: Jiàn Yì Zhàn; Pe̍h-ōe-jī: Kiàn-ek-chàn), was used as an Allied espionage base. Communication between the agents was done through smuggling messages in empty toothpaste tubes, salted fish and diaries.

Operation Gustavus failed before the agents managed to achieve any results. A communist guerrilla who was captured by the Japanese in January 1944 revealed the existence of the Allied spy network operating on Pangkor Island. In response, the Japanese launched a full-scale counter-espionage operation on the island and by late March 1944, more than 200 Japanese soldiers were on the island. On 24 March, the Kempeitai arrested a fisherman, Chua Koon Eng (Chinese: 蔡群英; Pe̍h-ōe-jī: Chhòa Kûn-eng; pinyin: Cài Qúnyīng), at Teluk Murrek on the Perak coast. Chua was working on Pangkor Island when Li Han-kwong (Chinese: 李汉光; Pe̍h-ōe-jī: Lí Hàn-kong; pinyin: Lǐ Hànguāng) of Force 136 approached him and requested to use his boat for their communications. Chua confessed and implicated Li in the spy ring. The Japanese laid a trap for Li and, using Chua as bait, captured him shortly after. Under torture, Li confirmed Chua's story but managed to avoid revealing more than what the Japanese already knew. The Japanese took Li to Ipoh for further interrogation, but Li managed to escape on 26 March 1944 into the jungle, after which the Japanese started searching for Li and other Force 136 members. The entire spy network was destroyed by 31 March 1944 and was not re-established until February 1945.

== Capture and death ==
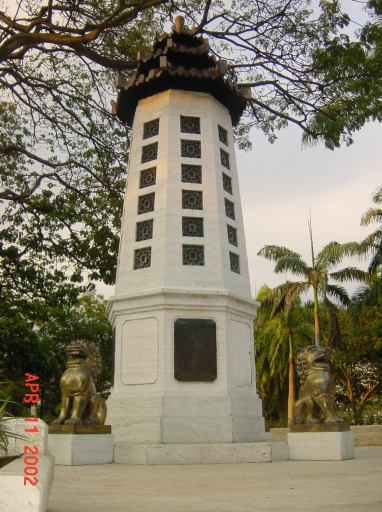
The Lim Bo Seng Memorial in Singapore

Lim was captured by the Kempeitai under Major Ōnishi Satoru (大西覺) at a roadblock in Gopeng, Perak around March or April 1944, and taken to the Kempeitai headquarters for interrogation. He refused to provide the Japanese with any information about Force 136 despite being subjected to torture, and protested against the ill treatment of his comrades in prison. He fell ill with dysentery and was bedridden by the end of May 1944. Lim died in the early hours of 29 June 1944 at the age of 35, and was buried behind the Batu Gajah prison compound in an unmarked spot. After the Japanese surrender, Gan Choo Neo was informed of her husband's death by the priest of St. Andrew's School. She went to Batu Gajah with her eldest son to bring her husband's remains home.

Lim's remains arrived at the Tanjong Pagar railway station in Singapore on 7 December 1945. Upon arrival, the hearse was sent off by a large procession of British officers and prominent businessmen from the station to Hock Ann Biscuit Factory in Upper Serangoon Road via Armenian Street. On the same day, a memorial service for Lim was held at the Tong Teh Library of the Kuomintang Association in Singapore.

A funeral service was held on 13 January 1946 at City Hall. Lim's remains was transported in a coffin to a hill in MacRitchie Reservoir (coordinates: 1°20'31.76"N 103°49'50.60"E) for burial with full military honours. Lim was posthumously awarded the rank of shaojiang (major-general) by the Nationalist government of the Republic of China.

The Lim Bo Seng Memorial was unveiled at the Esplanade on 29 June 1954, the 10th anniversary of his death. There are also places named after Lim, such as Bo Seng Avenue in Thomson, Singapore, and Jalan Lim Bo Seng in Ipoh, Malaysia.

== Personal life ==
In 1930, Lim married Gan Choo Neo (Chinese: 顏珠娘; Pe̍h-ōe-jī: Gân Chu-niû; pinyin: Yán Zhū-niáng), a Nyonya woman from the Lim clan association in Singapore, and converted to Christianity after their marriage. They had four sons and four daughters; one of their daughters died around the age of two. Gan died of cancer on 25 September 1979 at the age of 71.

Lim's eldest son, Lim Leong Geok (Chinese: 林良玉; Pe̍h-ōe-jī: Lîm Liông-gio̍k; pinyin: Lín Liángyù; 1932–2004), was an executive director of the SMRT Corporation and a key figure in the development of the Mass Rapid Transit (MRT) and Singapore's public transport system. He was posthumously awarded the Distinguished Contribution award by the Land Transport Authority on 31 March 2010.

One of Lim's grandsons, Lim Teck Yin, is a former brigadier general in the Singapore Armed Forces and chief executive officer of Sport Singapore.

== Legacy ==
=== Lim Bo Seng Memorial, Esplanade Park, Singapore ===
The Lim Bo Seng Memorial in Esplanade Park was unveiled on 29 June 1954, marking the tenth anniversary of his death. The ceremony was led by Lieutenant-General Sir Charles Loewen, then Commander-in-Chief of the Far East Land Forces, to honour Lim's leadership within the wartime resistance. The foundation stone of the memorial had been laid earlier, on 3 November 1953, by Malcolm MacDonald, the British Commissioner-General for Southeast Asia.

=== Bo Seng Avenue, Thomson, Singapore ===
In Singapore, Bo Seng Avenue in the Thomson area is also named in his honour. The road serves a residential neighbourhood characterised by low-density landed housing, situated near the MacRitchie Reservoir where Lim's remains were eventually interred with full military honours in 1946.

=== Jalan Lim Bo Seng, Ipoh, Perak ===
Jalan Lim Bo Seng is a major thoroughfare in Ipoh, Malaysia, named to honour the wartime contributions and sacrifice of the resistance hero. The street is located near St. Michael's Institution, a prominent school that served as the regional headquarters for the Japanese administration in Perak during the occupation. During this period, the building was utilised as a primary operations centre for the military and the Kenpeitai, the Japanese secret police. The proximity of the road to this former interrogation site serves as a poignant tribute to Lim and other resistance members who endured imprisonment and torture at the hands of the Kenpeitai.

== In popular culture ==
In 1998, Asiapac Books published a comic book (ISBN 981-229-067-2) based on Lim's life. It was written by Clara Show and illustrated by Chu Yi Min.

In 1997, Singapore's Chinese-language television channel, TCS Channel 8, aired a television series, The Price of Peace, about the Japanese occupation of Singapore. Singaporean actor Rayson Tan portrayed Lim as a semi-fictional protagonist in the drama.

In June 2025, Lim was portrayed in a Yue opera titled Marshal Lim Bo Seng (Chinese: 《林谋盛元帅》) by director and playwright Lin Jia, staged during Singapore's first Traditional Chinese Opera Festival. Produced by Tang Renaissance (Chinese: 大唐文化传播), the opera depicted Lim's resistance efforts during the Japanese occupation, incorporating his personal letters adapted into verse. The production used traditional operatic elements to highlight his patriotism and historical significance. The festival was organized by the Singapore Chinese Cultural Centre and the National Arts Council.

== See also ==
- Adnan Saidi
