= Lim Bo Seng Memorial =

War memorial in Singapore

- National Heritage Board
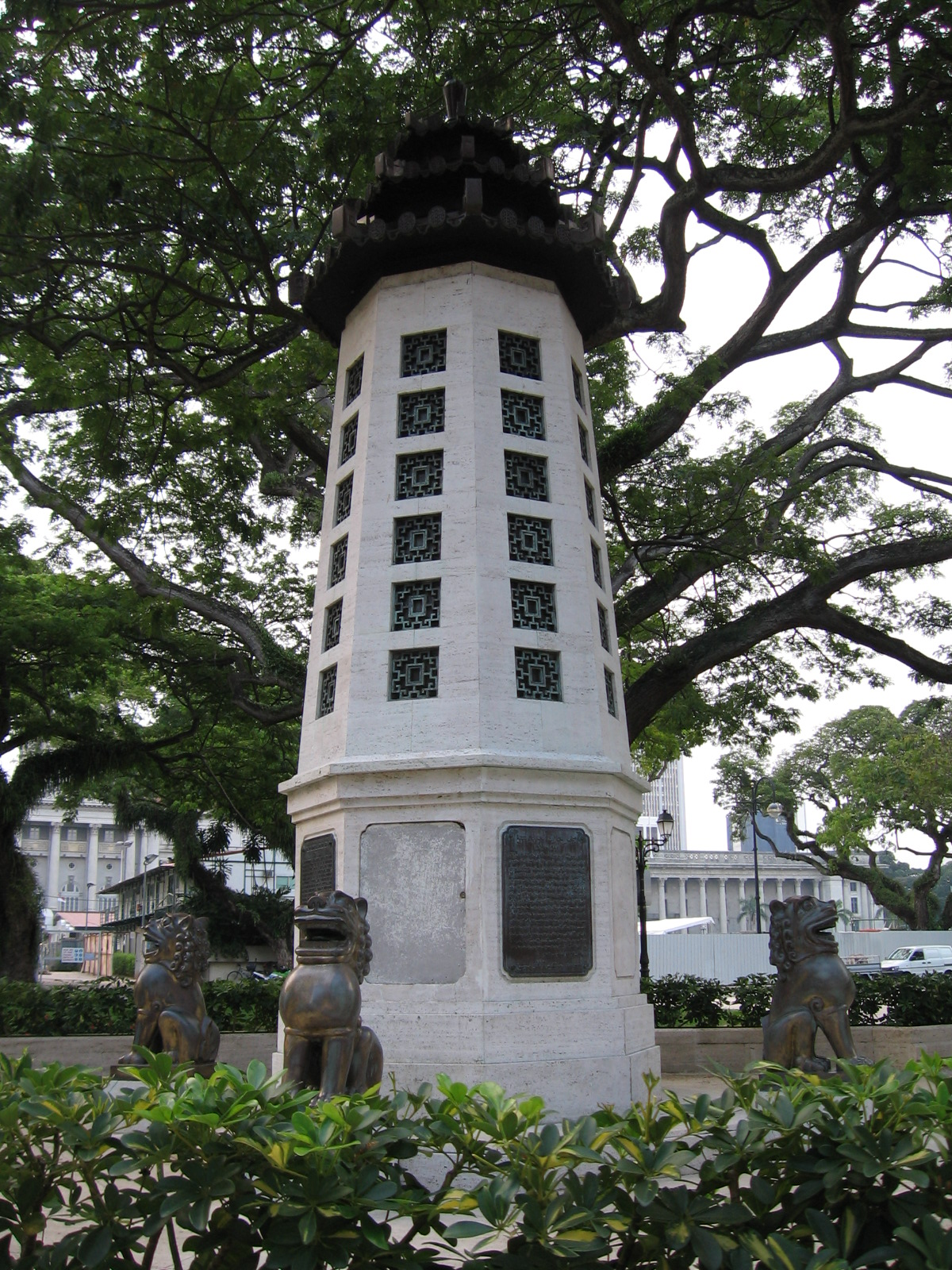
- Lim Bo Seng Memorial
- For Major-General Lim Bo Seng
- Established: 3 November 1953; 72 years ago
- Unveiled: 29 June 1954; 72 years ago
- Location: 1°17′18.6″N 103°51′11.1″E; Esplanade Park near Downtown Core, Singapore
- Designed by: Ng Keng Siang
Inscription
Major-General
Lim Bo Seng
1909-1944
Major-General Lim Bo Seng was born on 27 April 1909 in Nan-an, Fukien, China. He came to Singapore at the age of 16. After studying at Raffles Institution and Hongkong University, he inherited his father's business in Malaya. Since 1937 he became prominent in anti-Japanese activities. When Singapore fell in 1942, he went to Chungking and on instructions from the Chinese government, he joined the underground resistance section of 136 Force under the Supreme Allied Command, South-East Asia, on 2 November 1943 as Commanding Officer of the Malayan Chinese section. He landed from a submarine at Bagan Bator in Perak to join the British and Chinese officers already working in Malaya, with anti-Japanese forces. Later he left the jungle to work in Ipoh, but he was discovered and arrested by the Japanese Military Police on 27 March 1944. He manfully endured repeated tortures to which he ultimately succumbed on 29 June 1944, at the age of 35. He died in the Batu Fajah prison, a martyr to the cause of a liberated Malaya and to his loyalty to his comrades. On 13 January 1946, he was buried with full military honours in Singapore.
Erected by The Lim Bo Seng Memorial Committee
29 June 1954

National monument of Singapore
- Designated: 28 December 2010; 15 years ago
- Reference no.: 63

The Lim Bo Seng Memorial is a war memorial in Esplanade Park, Singapore. It was erected in 1954 in honour of resistance fighter Lim Bo Seng for his acts during World War II. The octagonal pagoda memorial is the only structure in Singapore that commemorates an individual's efforts in World War II.

Plans for a memorial dedicated to Lim were considered by local authorities as early as November 1945. With the establishment of the Lim Bo Seng Memorial Committee in 1946, it proposed a memorial for Lim Bo Seng between 1946 and 1947, though either was rejected or had its plans modified. Its sixth plan, which intended to be the last plan submitted by the committee, was approved by the government in July 1952, where they would built the memorial as part of the proposed Esplanade Park. Works began in September 1953, with its foundation stone laid by British Commissioner-General for Southeast Asia Malcolm MacDonald. The memorial was opened unveiled Commander-in-Chief of the Far East Land Forces Charles Loewen on 29 June 1954, the 10th anniversary of Lim's death. The memorial was also the site for the 15th and 50th anniversaries of his death. The Lim Bo Seng Memorial was collectively gazetted as a National monument alongside The Cenotaph and Tan Kim Seng Fountain as the "Esplanade Park Memorials" on 28 December 2010.

== Background ==
Lim Bo Seng (Chinese: 林谋盛) was a resistance fighter in World War II (WWII). Born on 27 April 1909 in Fujian, China, Lim moved to Singapore at 16 years old. Lim's resistance movements began as early as 1937 when Japan invaded China, where he organised boycotts against Japanese products and raised funds for the Chinese war effort. Before the Japanese captured Singapore, Lim fled to British-controlled India in February 1942, where he joined Force 136. In May 1943, he, along with several members of the group, landed in Japanese-occupied Malaya to set up an intelligence network to prepare for Operation Zipper. However, in March 1944, he was captured by the Japanese in Ipoh after a Force 136 member was tortured to reveal information on Lim's location. Lim refused to tell the Japanese on Force 136's operations, which subsequently led them torture Lim. Lim Bo Seng died on 29 June 1944 in Batu Gajah Jail, Perak. His remains were transported back to Singapore in December 1945 and he was buried at MacRitchie Reservoir in January 1946.

== History ==
Plans for a memorial to Lim Bo Seng were first considered by local authorities in November 1945. With the establishment of the Lim Bo Seng Memorial Committee in 1946, which had representatives from the Chinese Nationalist Government, it proposed a memorial for Lim Bo Seng between 1946 and 1947, with the government rejecting or "trimming" five of the committee's proposals, one of them detailing a memorial park at a spot in MacRitchie Reservoir where Lim spent time with his family. The committee was frustrated with the government's responses, with its secretary Chuang Hui Tsuan declaring that "the delay is a painful blow to the Chinese community. Our efforts and time have been wasted". On 26 September 1951, the committee announced that a sixth proposal will be submitted, which intended to be its final as "[they] will not tolerate any further shabby treatment". The proposal was approved by the committee on 27 February 1952 and an agreement was reached between the committee and the government on 5 June 1952, where the memorial will be built as part of a proposed park in the Esplanade. The government approved the plan on 9 July 1952 and was expected to cost $50,000.

Works for the Lim Bo Seng memorial began on 8 September 1953, with the British Commissioner-General for Southeast Asia Malcolm MacDonald laying its foundation stone on 3 November 1953. By December, its concrete foundation was already up. Originally expected to be ready by the end of 1953, it was delayed until January 1954 as the delivery for its roof and marble work was delayed. Its roof was laid in January 1954, though completion for the memorial was delayed until the end of February due to the rain. On 29 June 1954, the memorial was unveiled by Sir Charles Loewen, the Commander-in-Chief of the Far East Land Forces, in front of a crowd of people including Lim's widow, her children, and some members of the Force 136 present at the 10th anniversary of Lim Bo Seng.

On 29 June 1959, the 15th anniversary of Lim Bo Seng's death was held at the memorial. The 50th anniversary of Lim's death was also held at his memorial on 29 June 1994. On 28 December 2010, Lim Bo Seng Memorial, along with The Cenotaph and Tan Kim Seng Fountain, were collectively gazetted as the "Esplanade Park memorials" by the Preservation of Monuments Board as a National Monument since they "honoured individuals for their contributions to the community".

== Details ==
The Lim Bo Seng Memorial is located in Esplanade Park, which is near Connaught Drive. Designed by Ng Keng Siang, it is modelled after the nationalist-built Victory Memorial in Nanjing, China. The memorial occupies a site donated by the colonial government measuring 100 feet (30 m) by 80 feet (24 m) near The Padang.

The memorial is a 12 feet (3.7 m) high octagonal pagoda made of white marble with a three-tier bronze roof on a marble and concrete pedestal. It is guarded by four bronze lions. Its bronze and marble features are imported from Hong Kong. Four bronze plaques with an account of Lim's life are installed on the pedestal. There are written in English, Chinese, Tamil and Jawi; the four official languages of Singapore.

== Gallery ==
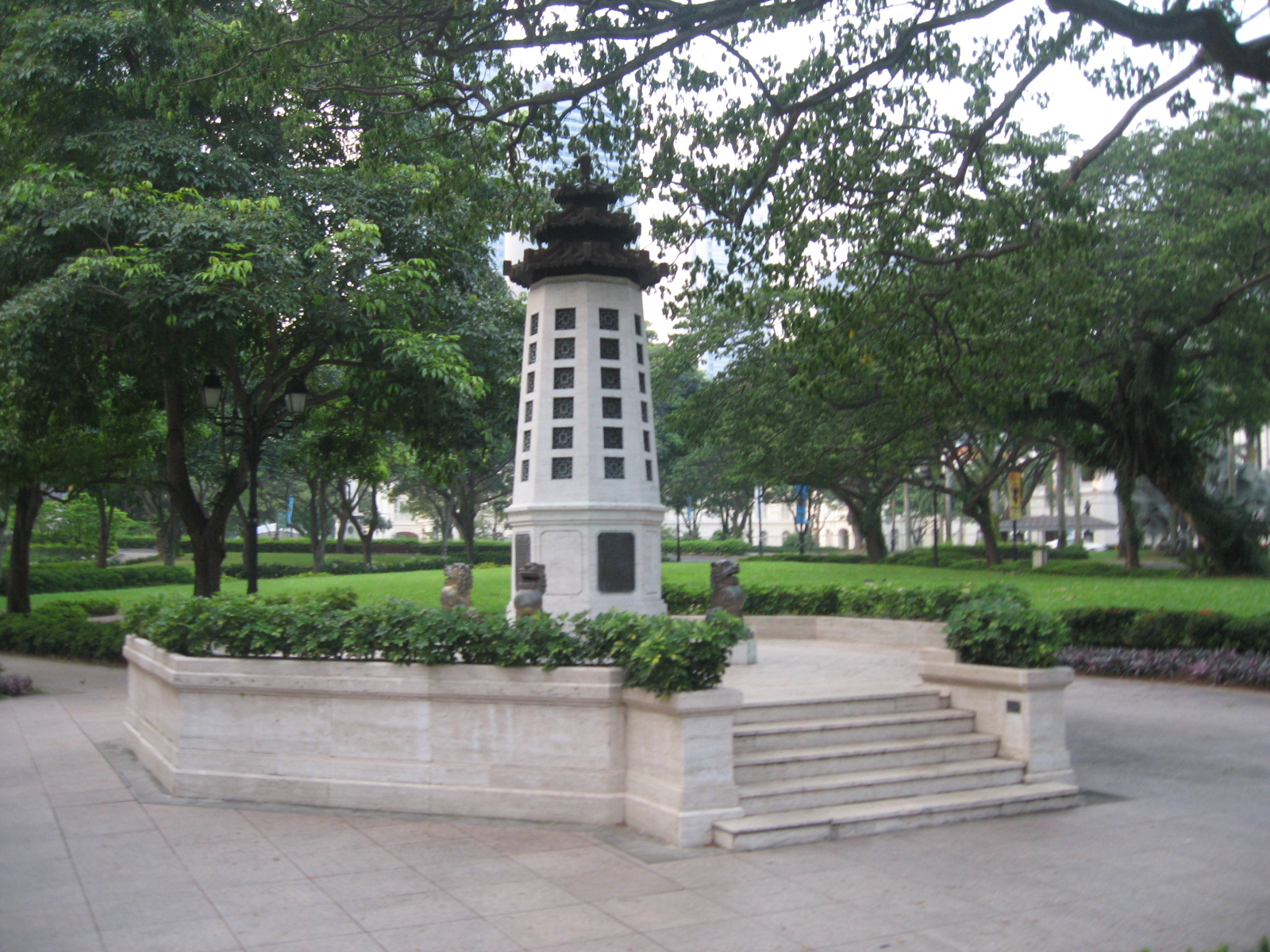

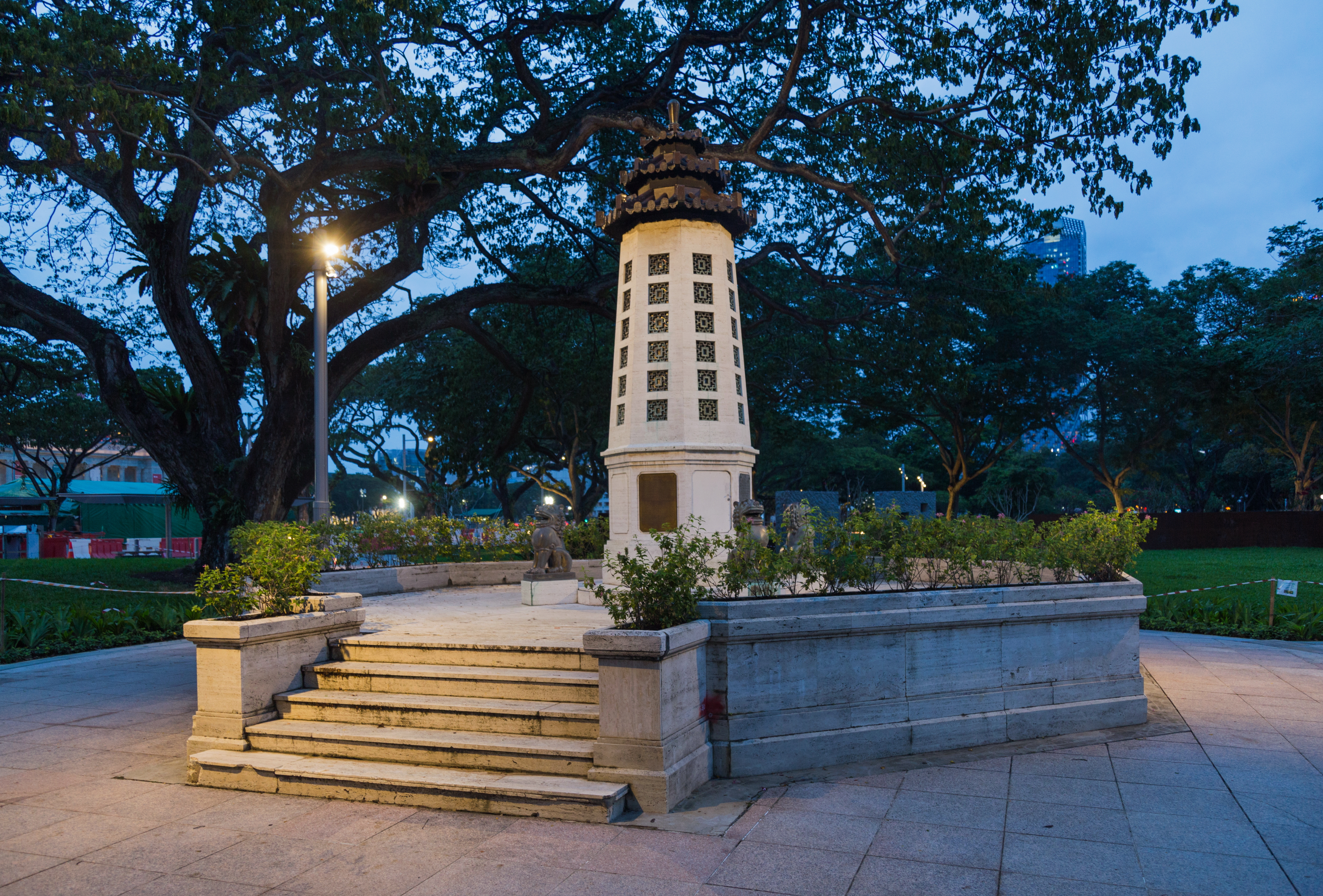
