= Esplanade – Theatres on the Bay =

Performing arts center in Singapore

Coordinates: 1°17′23″N 103°51′19″E

The Esplanade
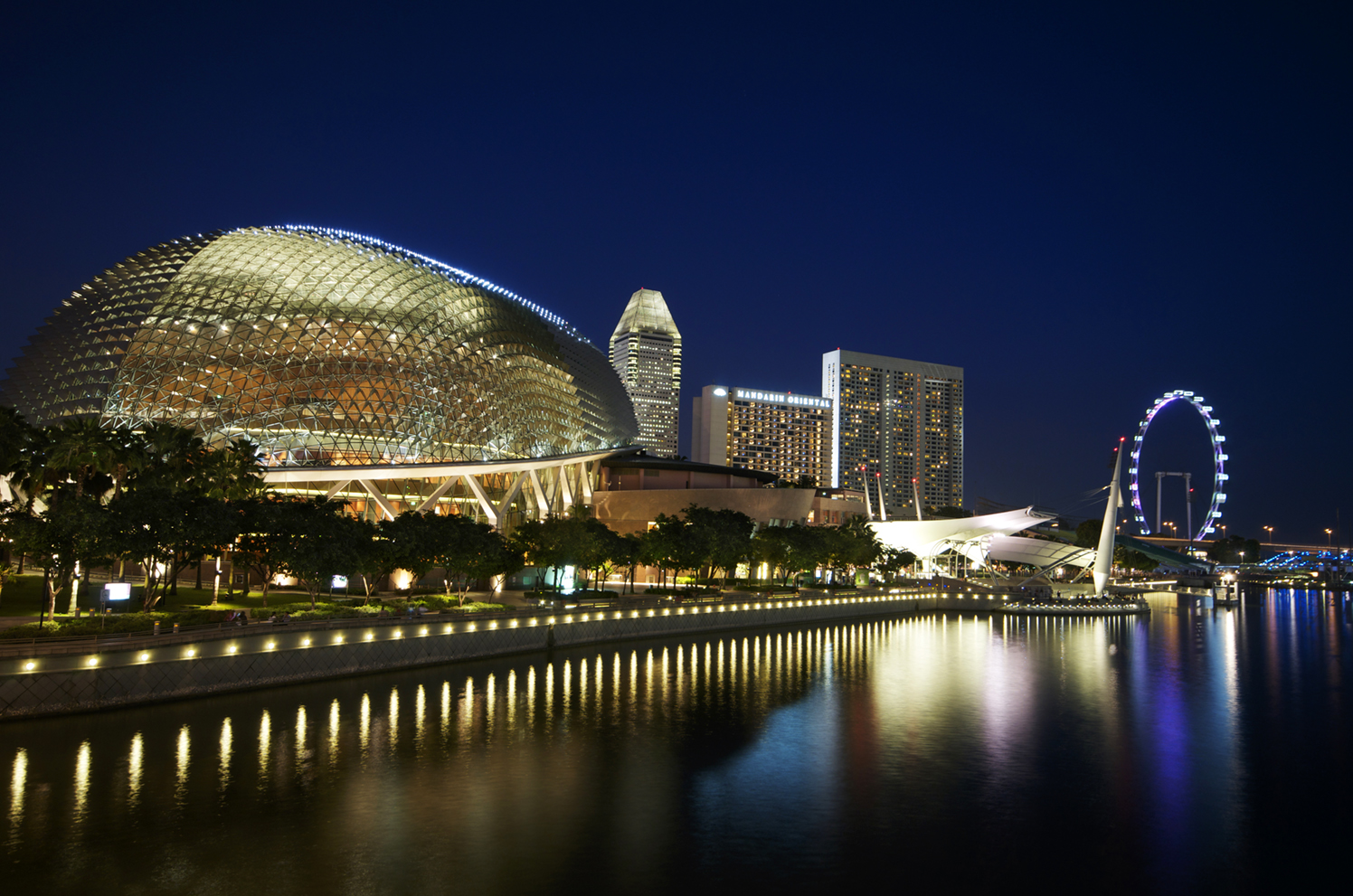
- Exterior of centre, viewed from Marina Bay (c.2010)

General information
- Location: Downtown Core, Singapore, 1 Esplanade Drive; Singapore 038981 (Esplanade – Theatres on the Bay)
- Groundbreaking: 11 August 1996; 30 years ago
- Opened: 12 October 2002; 24 years ago
- Inaugurated: 12 October 2002; 24 years ago
- Cost: S$600 million
- Owner: Ministry of Culture, Community and Youth
- Operator: Esplanade Company, Ltd.

Technical details
- Size: 60,000 m^{2} (6.0 ha)
- Floor count: 4

Design and construction
- Architects: DP Architects; Michael Wilford & Partners
- Developer: PWD Consultants
- Structural engineer: CPG Consultants
- Civil engineer: T. Y. Lin International
- Other designers: ARTEC Consultants; alwitra; Elmich; Theatre Project Consultants; Atelier Group; Mero Raumstruktur
- Main contractor: Penta-Ocean Construction

Other information
- Seating capacity: 1,950 (Lyric Theatre); 1,827 (Concert Hall); 600 (Waterfront Theatre); 600 (Outdoor Theatre); 245 (Recital Studio); 220 (Theatre Studio); 50 (Annexe Studio)
- Public transit: CC3 Esplanade NS25 EW13 City Hall

Website
- Official website

Esplanade – Theatres on the Bay (Note: Teater di Persisiran in Malay; also known as the Esplanade Theatres, or simply The Esplanade.) is a performing arts centre located in the Downtown Core of Singapore near the mouth of the Singapore River. Named after the nearby Esplanade Park, it consists of two rounded structures: one housing a concert hall with about 1,600 seats; and the other a theatre with a capacity of about 2,000 for the performing arts. It is nicknamed "The Durian".

== History ==
In 1989, the Advisory Council on Culture and the Arts, chaired by Deputy Prime Minister Ong Teng Cheong, produced a report assessing the status of arts in Singapore. The report would form the blueprint for cultural policy in Singapore, and led to the establishment of the National Arts Council and National Heritage Board. The report noted a lack of suitable performance arts venues; for example, Victoria Theatre was deemed only suitable for small to medium-sized performances, while Victoria Concert Hall was similarly lacking in its seating capacity and stage size. It recommended that a new performing arts centre be built, and in 1992 the Singapore Arts Centre (now known as "Esplanade Co Ltd") was established to build the Esplanade. The name for the centre was revealed in 1994. It was named after Esplanade due to its significant presence in the Esplanade Park.

Planning began in 1992, headed by the Singapore Arts Centre Co. It was developed at the cost of about SGD 600 million. Construction officially started on 11 August 1996, with a groundbreaking ceremony officiated by then Deputy Prime Minister Dr. Tony Tan. The Esplanade occupies the site of the former "Satay Club", a popular food haunt for Singaporeans which had been discontinued prior to the Esplanade's construction. The "Satay Club" had been relocated next to Sembawang Shopping Centre before moving over to the Gardens by the Bay since 2012, before closing down.

Completed in February 2001, the centre was officially opened on 12 October 2002, by the then President of Singapore S. R. Nathan.

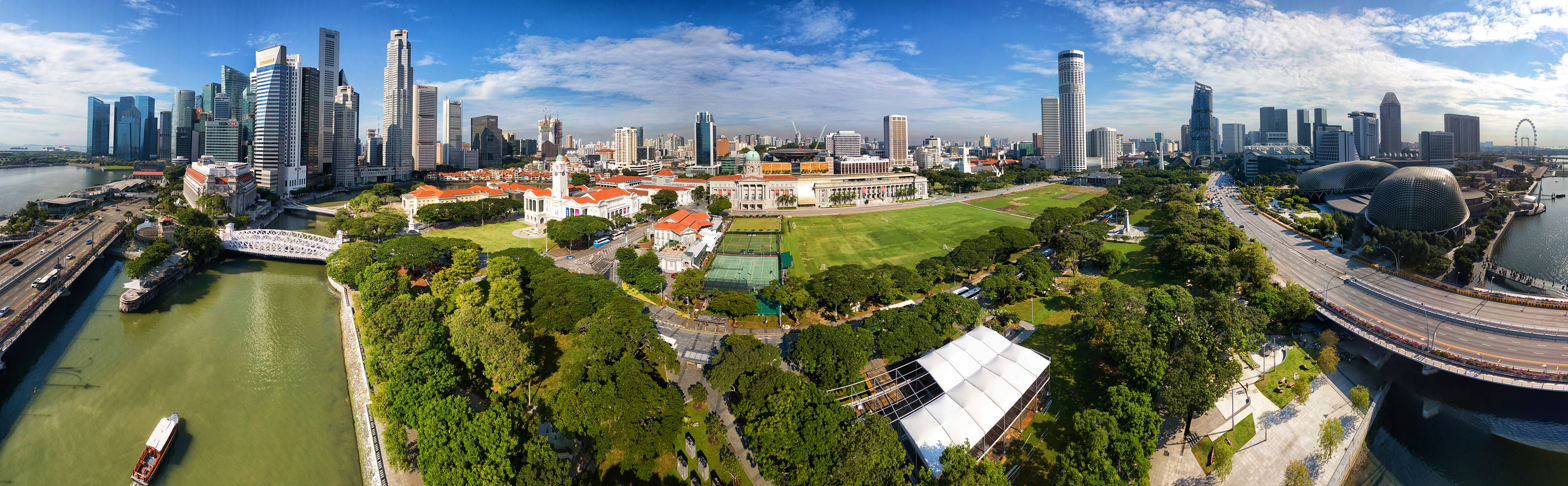
Aerial panorama of Singapore's Downtown Core. The Esplanade Theatre sits to the right of the panorama.

On 5 July 2005, the opening ceremony of the 117th IOC Session was staged in the Esplanade, featuring a 30-minute-long performance aimed at showcasing Singapore's multi-cultural heritage to her international audience.

Since 17 April 2010, Esplanade MRT station was opened, which provides a connection to the island's train system and the station was named after the theatre.

For its last financial year ending March 2014, the Esplanade incurred a loss of S$2.3 million, the first operating deficit since its opening. This loss was despite the Esplanade racking up relatively similar numbers in terms of audience attendance and activities from the previous year and was attributed primarily to the drop in sponsorship and donations.

Exercise Heartbeat 2016, simulating the Nice terrorist attacks, was held at this building on 2 September 2016.

== Design ==
The building was designed by two architectural firms working in conjunction: by DP Architects (DPA) of Singapore and the London-based Michael Wilford & Partners (MWP), although the latter left the project in May 1995. The design consists of two rounded space frames fitted with triangulated glass elements and sunshades, which balance outward views with solar shading.

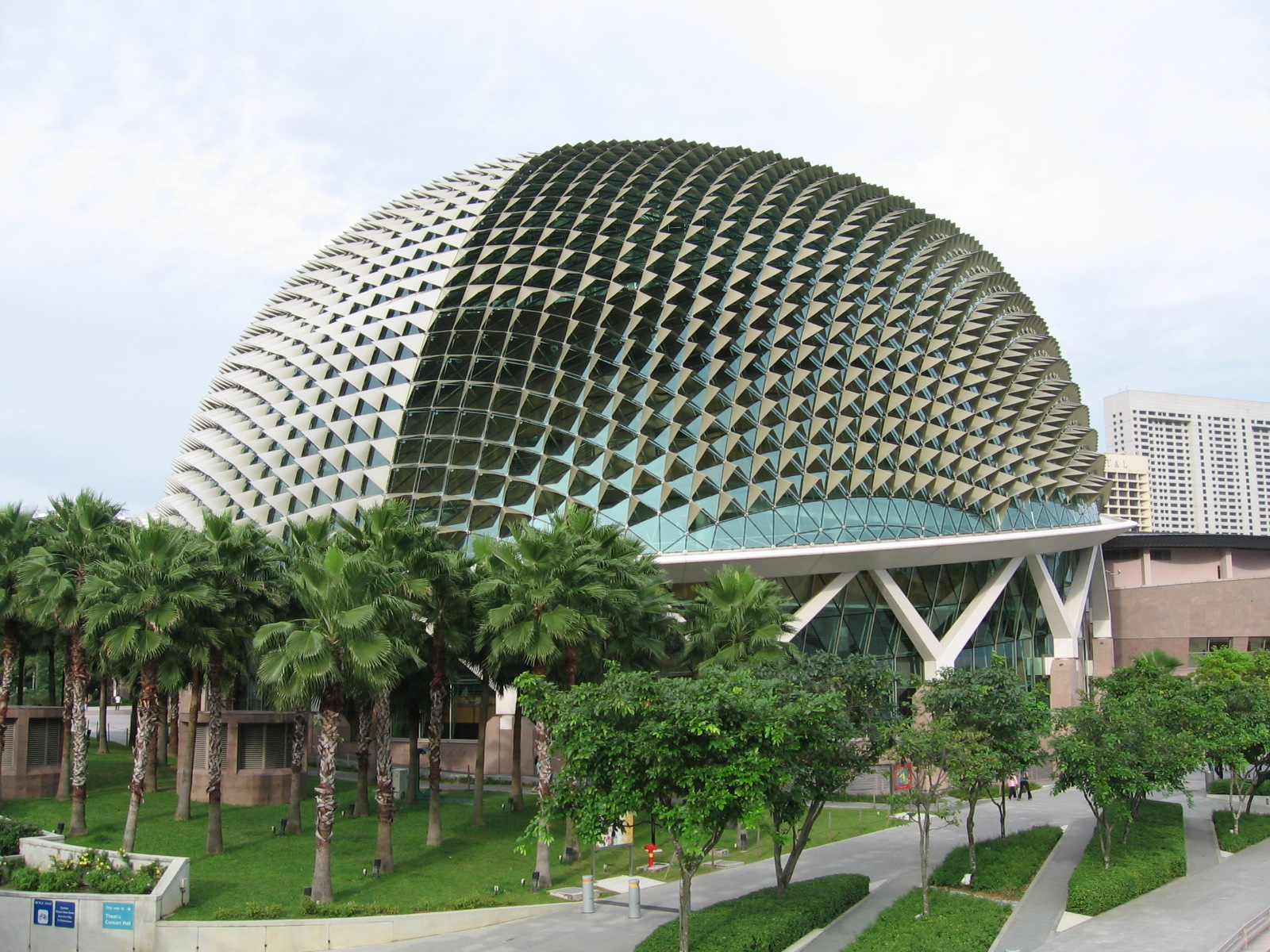
Aluminium sunshades ornament the roof of the Esplanade.

The original design, presented to the public in 1994, consisted of unadorned glass cases over the theatres, and initially elicited criticisms from the public, including calling it "two copulating aardvarks". Critics also accused that the design is insensitive to Singapore's location and climate as it would have created a greenhouse in the tropical climate of Singapore, but according to DPA director Vikas Gore some form of shading was always intended, and a cladding of aluminium sunshades was added to the final design. The unique architectural design has been said to have an appearance similar to either a fruit called durian or to insect eyes. Hence, the building is colloquially known to locals as "the big durian". More than 7,000 triangular aluminium sunshades that cover its two circular glass shell structures looked somewhat like spikes on two halves of the fruit. The structure was not intended to be a durian; it ended up being like that because it seemed to the architects the most interesting way of doing sunshades. They wanted to use glass because the views from Esplanade are beautiful in all directions, but since Singapore is so close to the equator, the structure also had to be protected from the Sun's heat and ultraviolet radiation.

== Performance venues ==
Other than performing venues, the Esplanade also contains meeting venues, as well as other lifestyle and arts related services. The concert hall and theatre are connected to the main concourse via a foyer, while the Esplanade Mall is accessible through an entry point located between these 2 halls.

=== Concert hall ===
Interior of the Concert Hall

The concert hall serves as a venue for concerts, recitals, and other performances. The orchestral platform is able to hold up to 120 musicians.

The concert hall's pipe organ comprises 4740 pipes and 61 stops. It was designed and built by Johannes Klais Orgelbau.

The Concert Hall is able to seat about 1,600 people over four levels.

=== Theatre ===
The Lyric Theatre which has a capacity of about 2,000 seats is a type of an adaptation of the horseshoe form of a traditional European opera house.

=== Recital Studio ===
The fan-shaped Recital Studio is able to contain 245 people and is a venue for small scale chamber musical performances, as well as presentations and meetings.

=== Theatre Studio ===
The Theatre Studio, with a capacity of up to 220, is a small setting for experimental theatre and dance presentations.

=== Singtel Waterfront Theatre ===
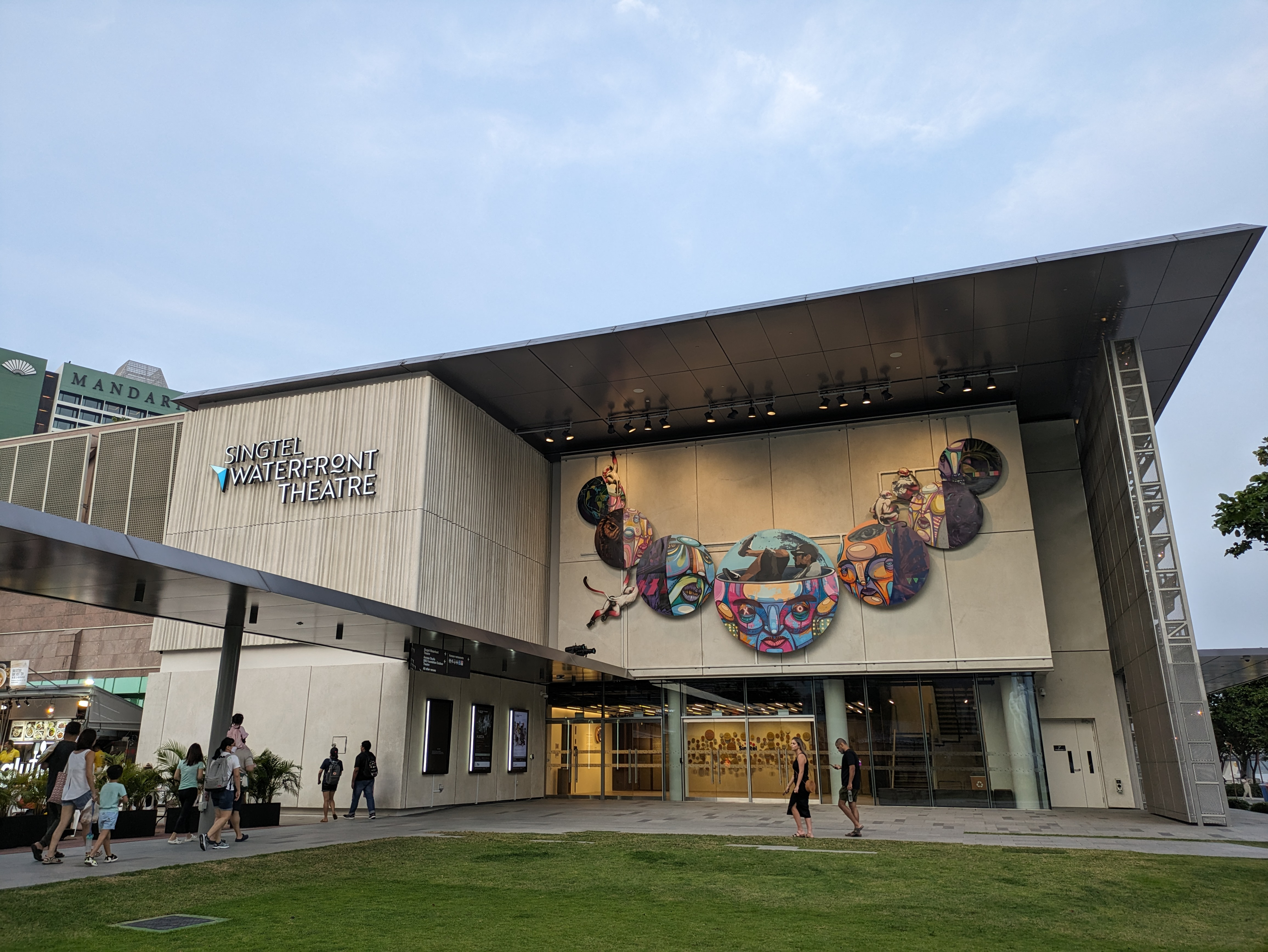
Facade of Singtel Waterfront Theatre taken in 2023

On 10 April 2017, the Ministry of Culture, Community and Youth announced that a new mid-sized waterfront theatre will be constructed at the now closed open-air car park. The theatre would cater for arts groups which require a mid-sized venue, facilitating modern productions which typically accommodate an audience of 500 to 1,000 people, and will feature flexible seating arrangements for future art showcases. Construction on the theatre commenced on 18 June 2019 with a ground-breaking ceremony officiated by Minister of Culture, Community and Youth Grace Fu. Funding for Esplanade's new S$30 million theatre came from government support, corporate sponsorships, and public donations. This included S$10 million from the government and a $10 million donation from Singtel. In recognition of the latter's contribution, the 611-seat venue was named the Singtel Waterfront Theatre for a 15-year period starting from its October 2022 launch.

== Programmes ==
The Esplanade's programmes are broadly organised around key areas – the community and access programmes form the foundation of activities at the centre, collaborations with mainly local arts groups help develop the industry, while leading international productions aim to offer innovative programmes in the major arts genres. These programmes are presented in different festivals and series designed to appeal to a broad range of audiences.

The Esplanade hosts approximately 3,500 performances and activities every year. Acts and performances hosted include the Queen musical We Will Rock You, Avenue Q and the defunct Mosaic Music Festival.

== Gallery ==
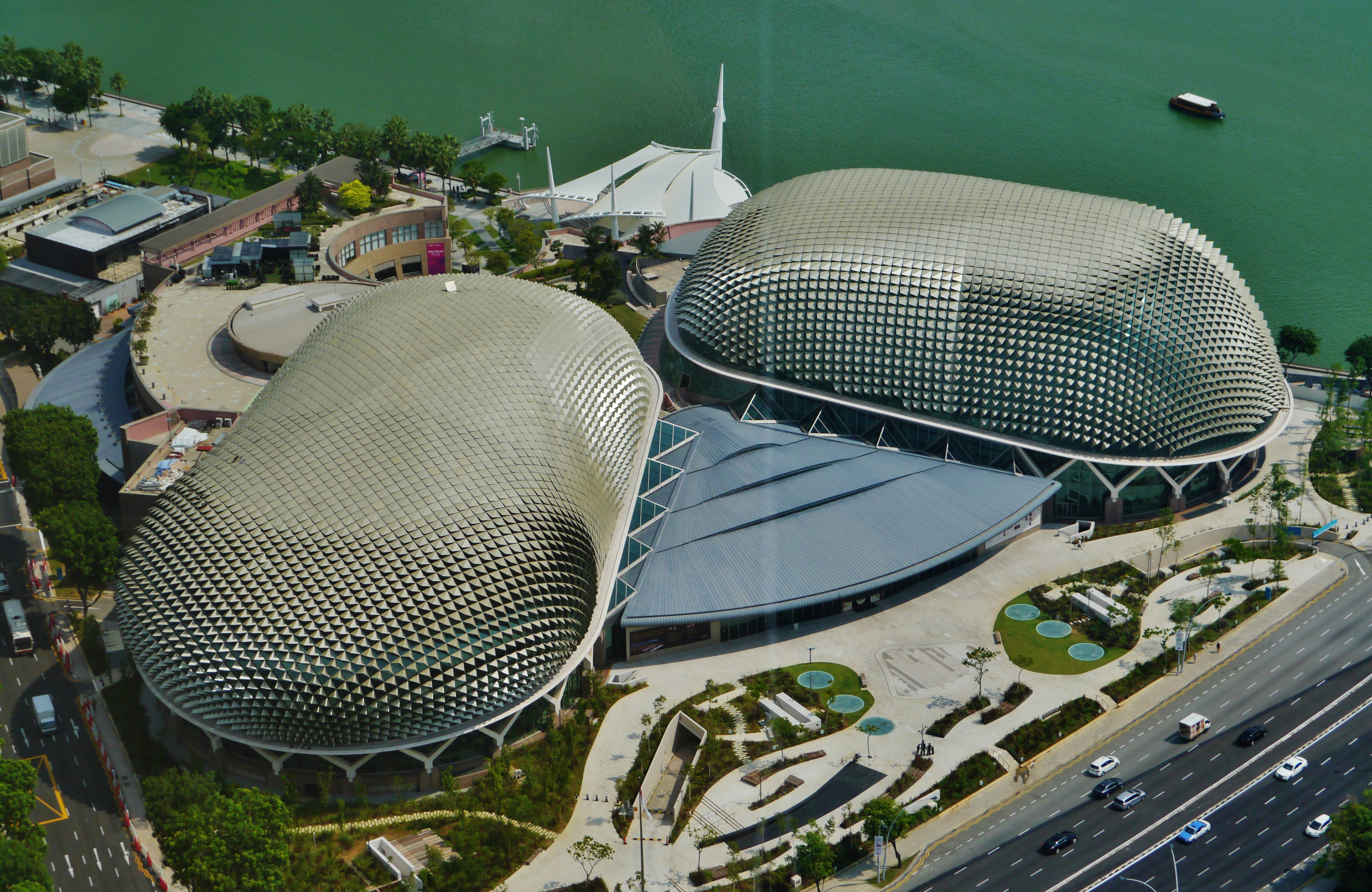
Aerial view of the Esplanade

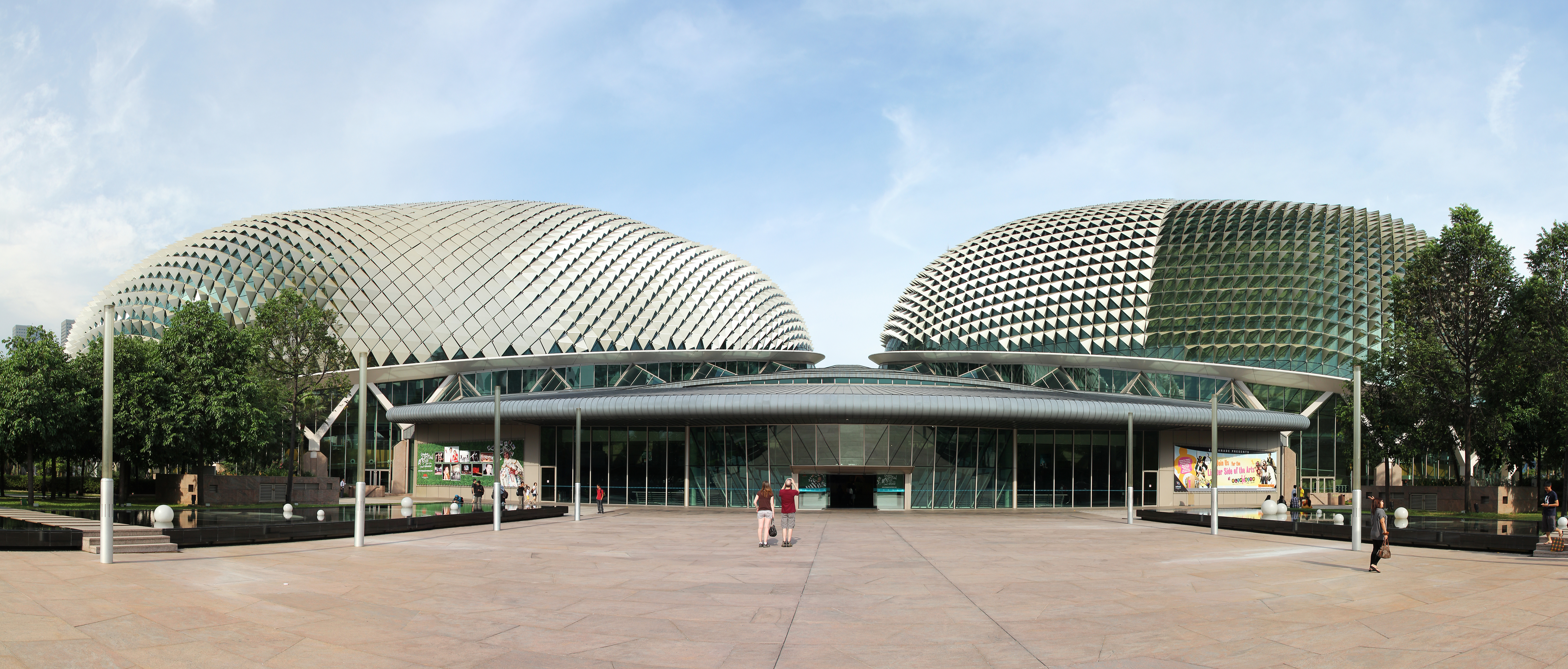
Performing Arts Centre, Esplanade, Marina Bay

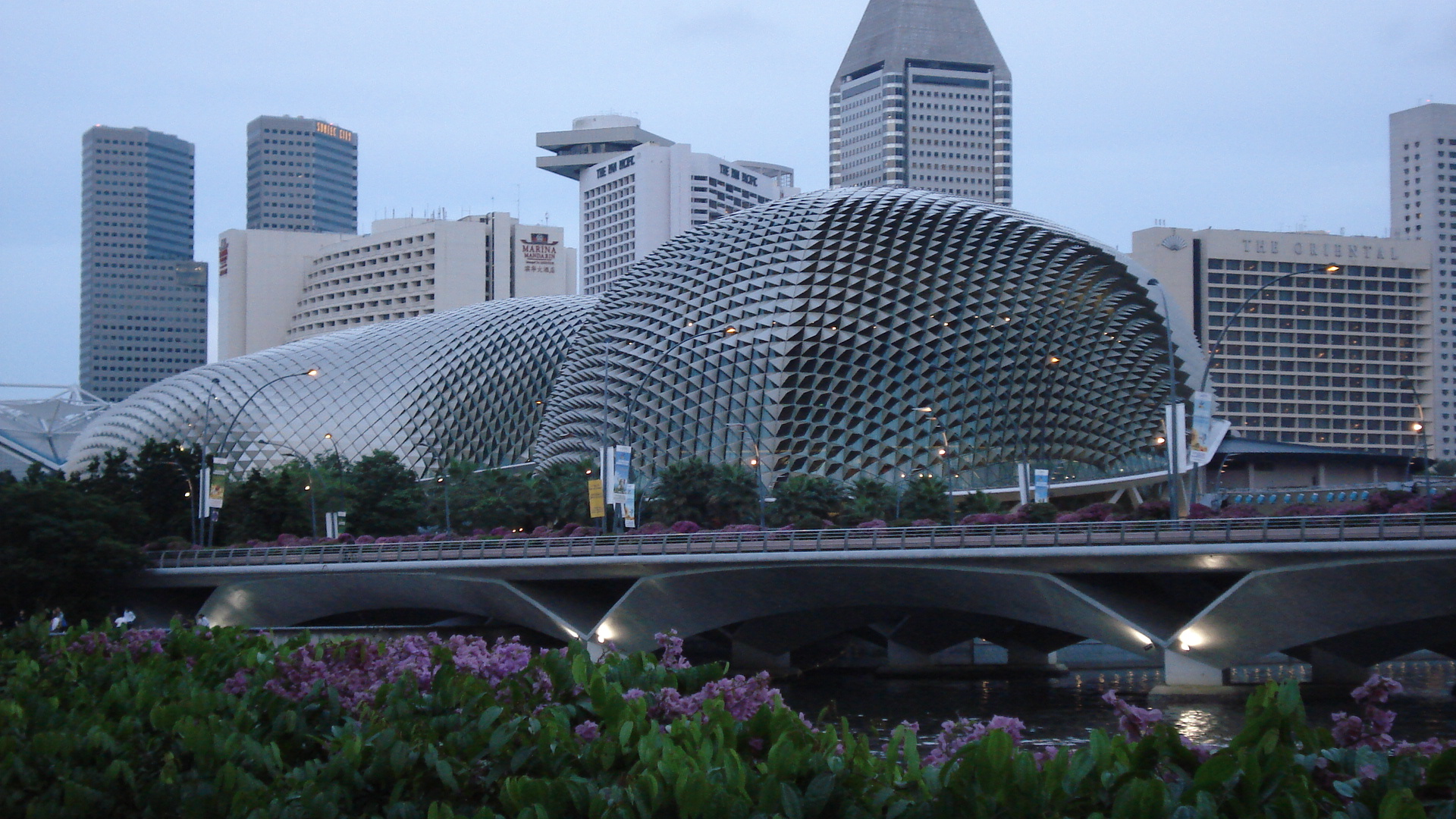
The durian-shaped Esplanade stands out in front of the Marina Square area

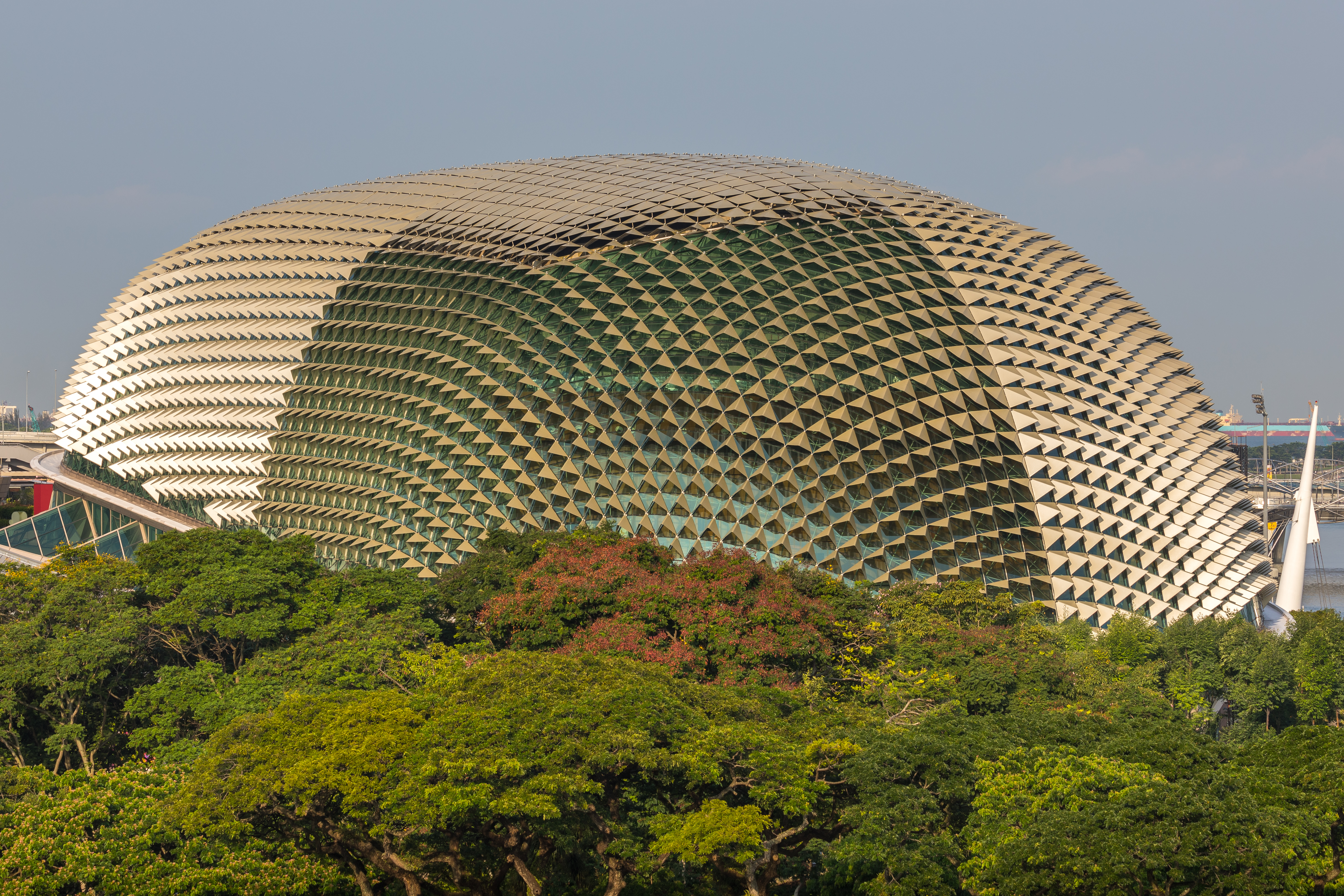
Another view of the performing Arts Centre

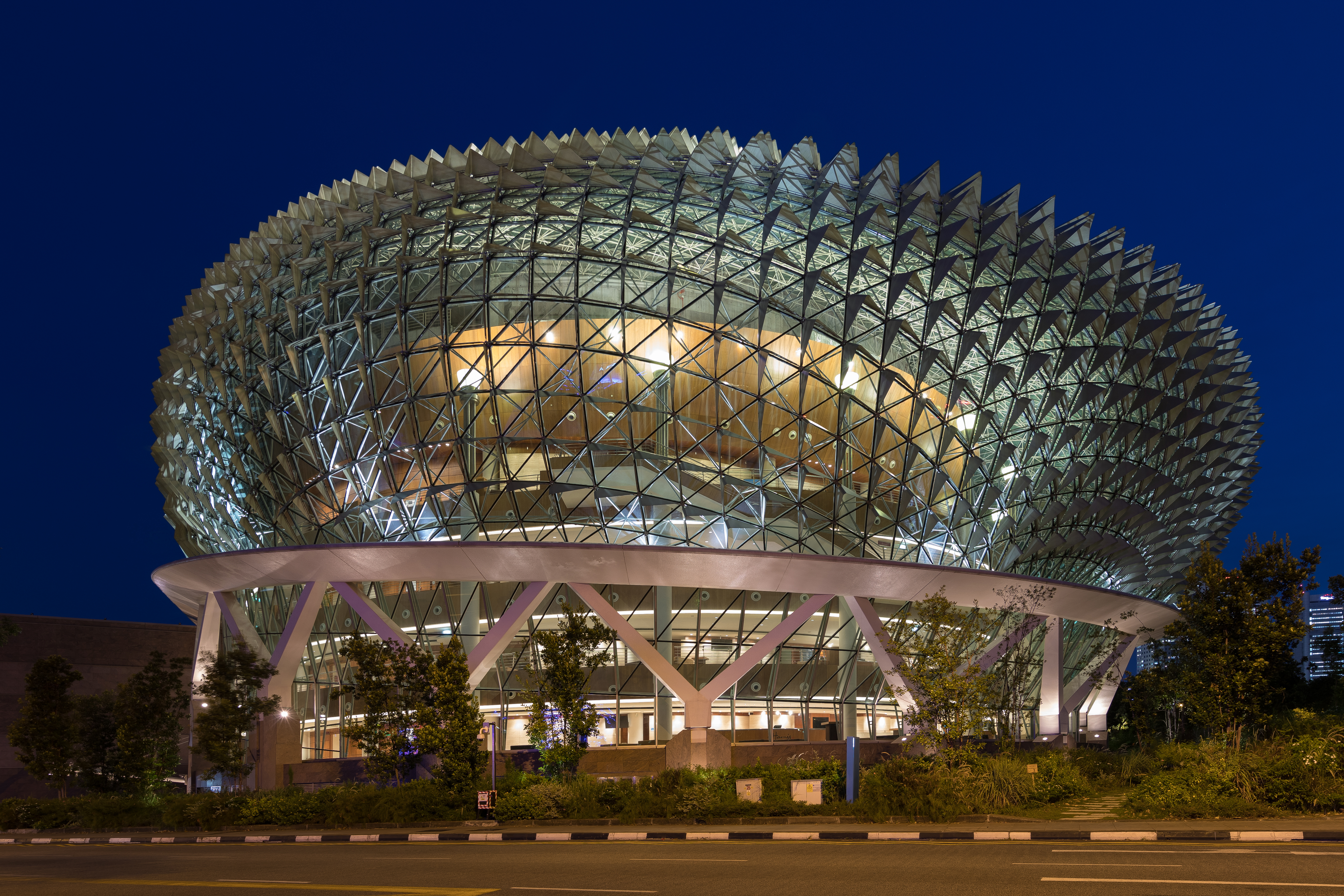
Esplanade Theatres on the Bay at blue hour

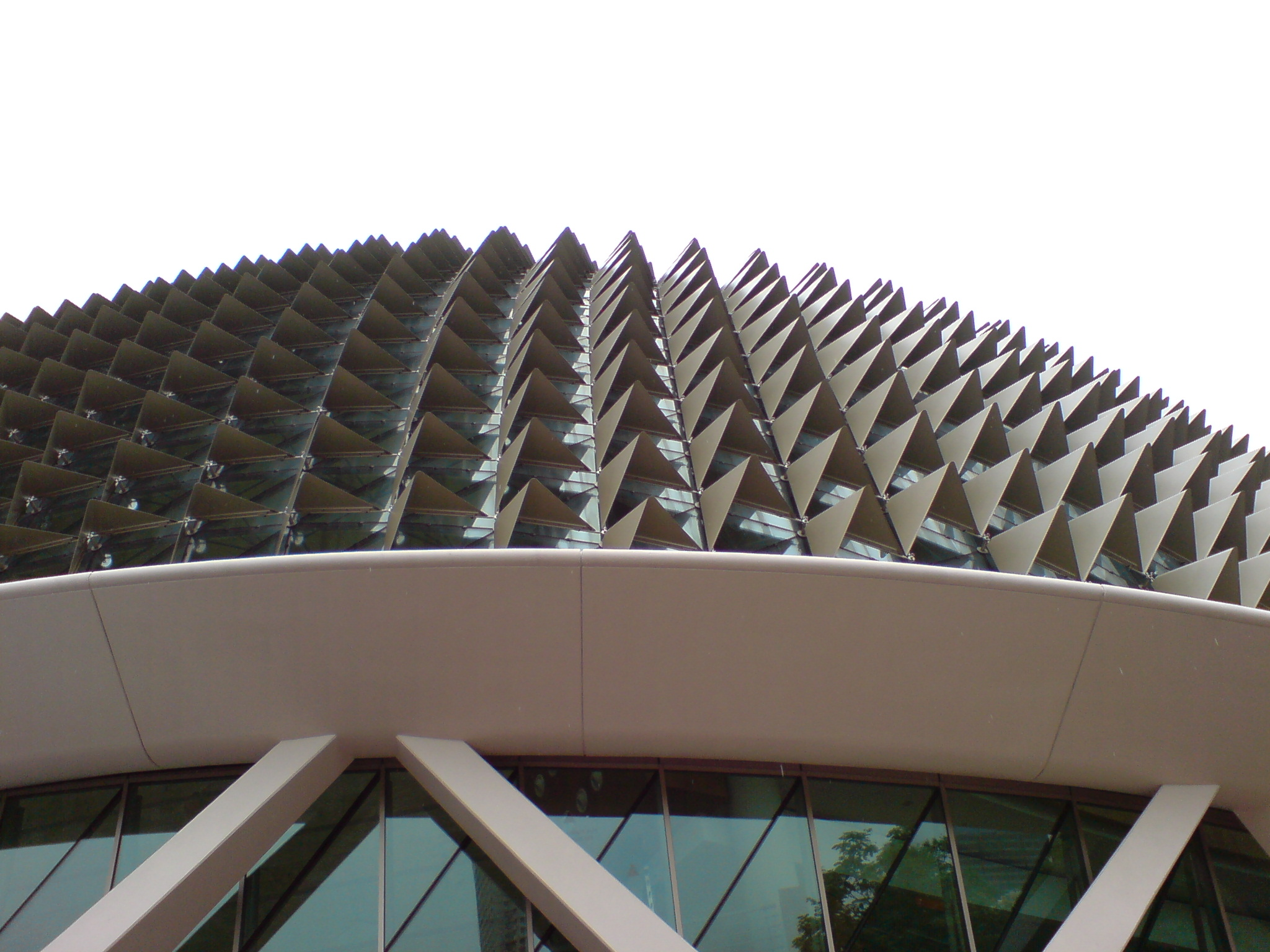
Closeup of the Esplanade shades

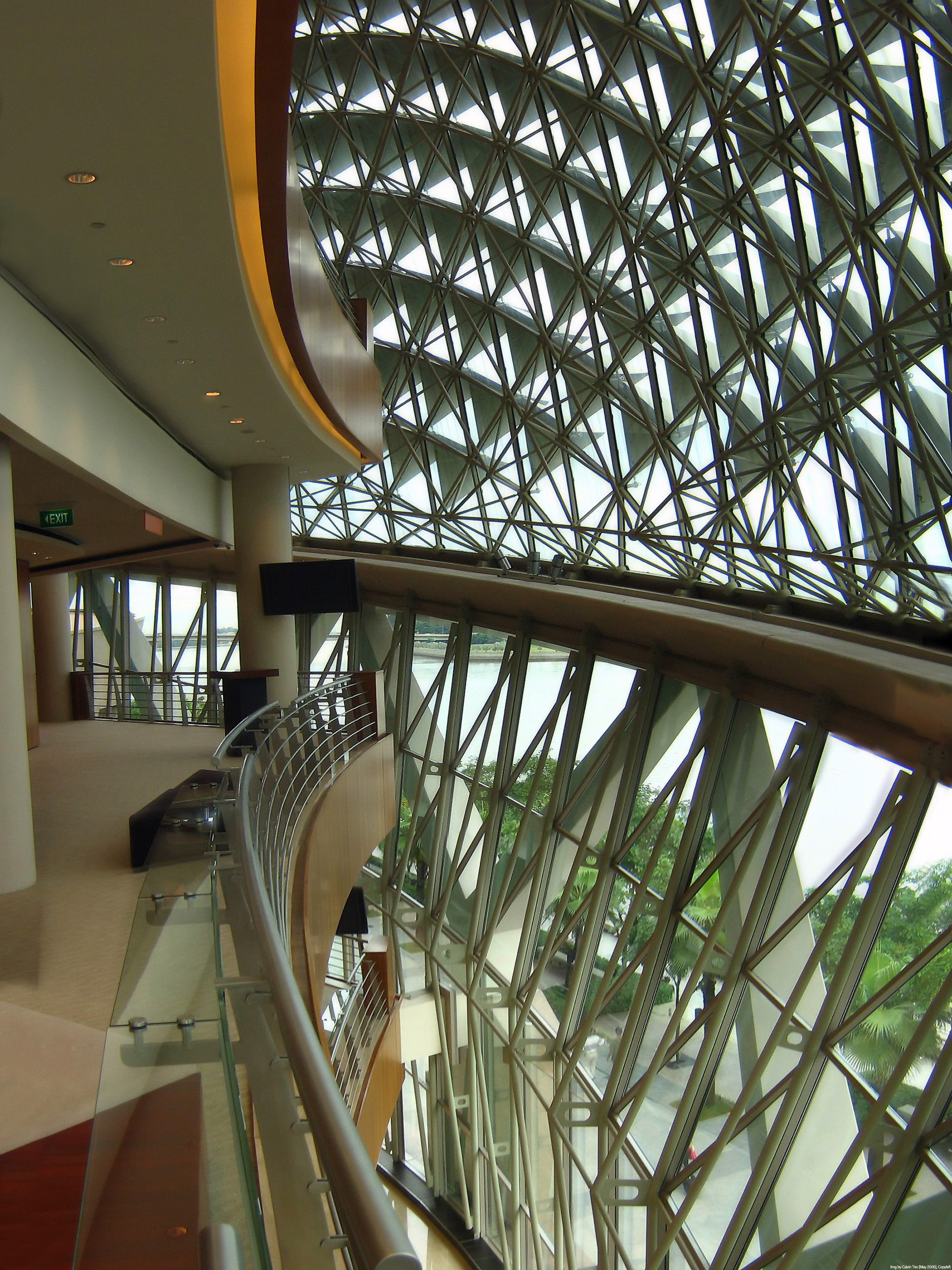
Foyer to the concert hall

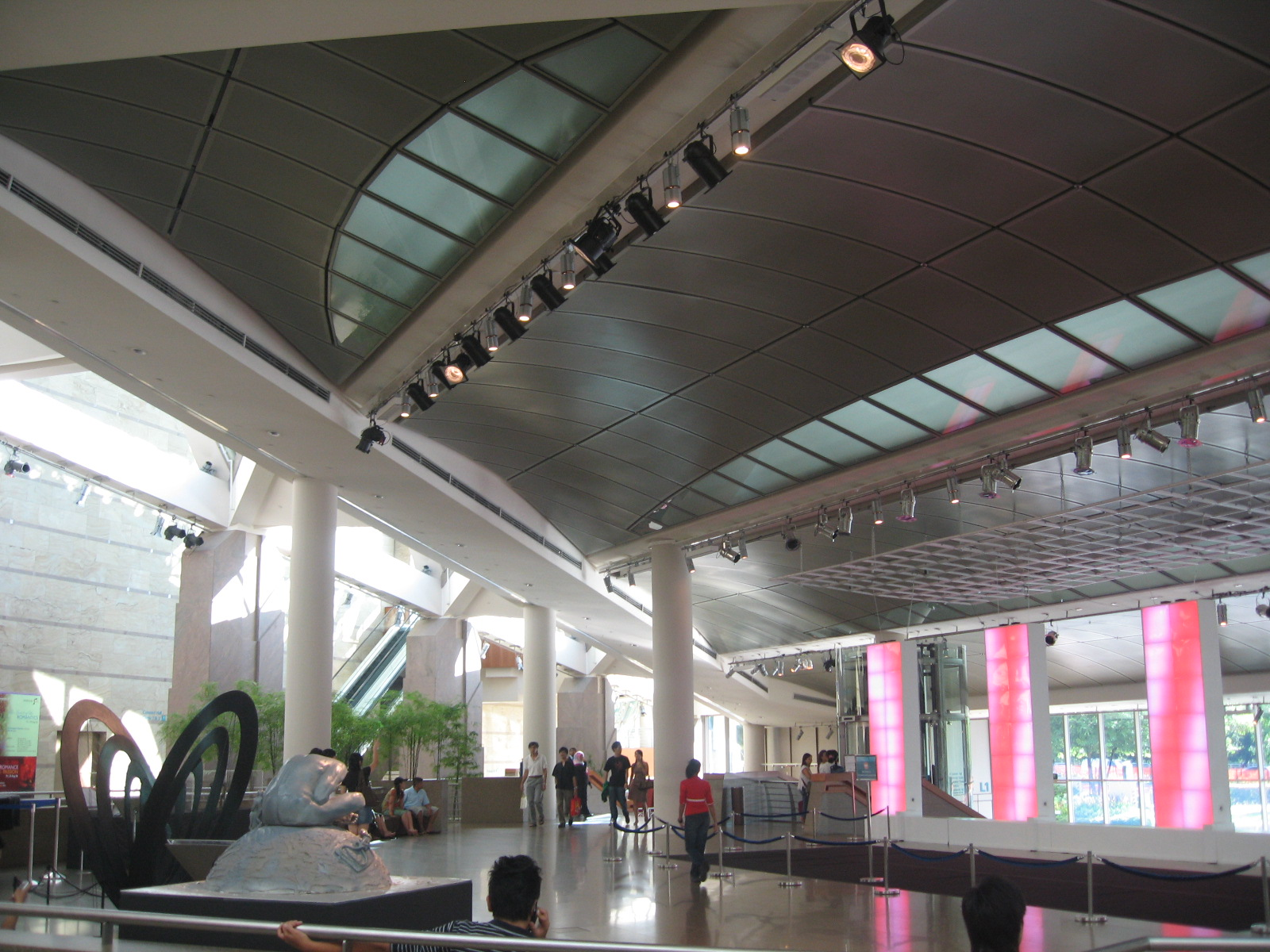
Interior

== See also ==
- List of concert halls
- Architecture of Singapore
- library@esplanade – defunct library in located Esplanade
