= Lim Teck Yin =

Singaporean CEO, athlete and soldier

Lim Teck Yin PPA(P) PPA(E)
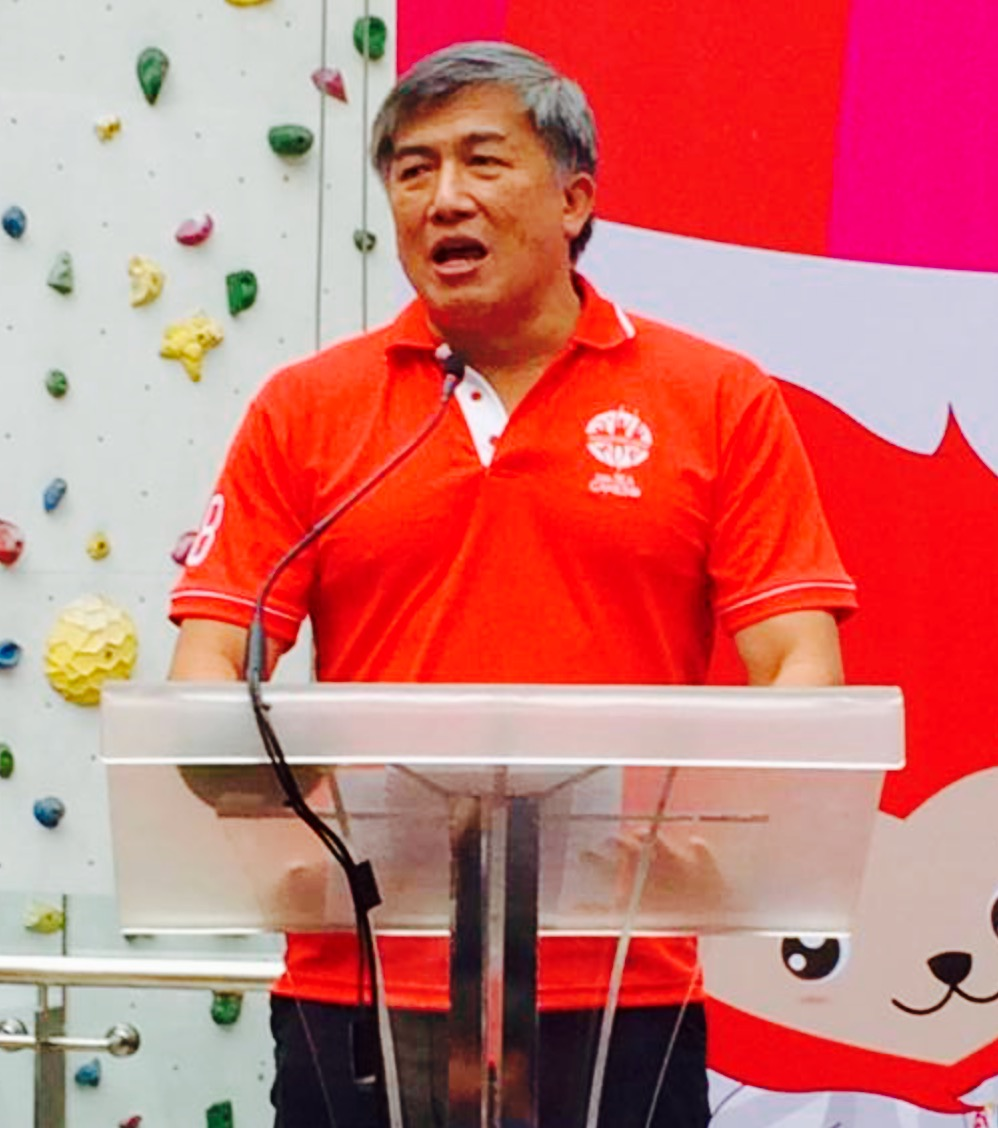
- Lim speaking at the Kallang Wave Mall during the 28th SEA Games, which was held in Singapore.
- Born: 24 December 1962 (age 63); State of Singapore
- Education: National University of Singapore (BBA); London Business School (MSc)
- Relatives: Lim Bo Seng (grandfather)
- Military career
- Branch: Singapore Army
- Service years: 1981–2011
- Rank: Brigadier-General
- Commands: Deputy Division Commander, 9th Division; Commander, 6th Division; Commandant, SAFTI Military Institute; Company Commander, 1st Commando Battalion; Platoon Commander, 1st Commando Battalion; Wing Commander, Combat Tracker Wing

Lim Teck Yin PPA(P) PPA(E) (Chinese: 林德仁; pinyin: Lín Dérén; born 24 December 1962) is a Singaporean public servant and former brigadier-general who served as the chief executive officer of Sport Singapore from 2011 - 2023.

Throughout his career, Lim has been involved in competitive sports as he sought to further his primary job in the army. Lim is also a former national water polo player with seven Southeast Asian Games medals, and a recipient of the Singapore National Olympic Council Team of the Year Award for 1986, 1989 and 1991.

Lim was awarded the Public Administration Medal (Military) (Silver) in 2006, and the Public Administration Medal (Gold) in 2015 for his contributions to Singapore's sports sector.

== Background ==
Lim was born in Singapore. His grandfather, Major-General Lim Bo Seng, was a former resistance fighter during World War II, and is regarded as a war hero in Singapore. Lim attended Anglo-Chinese School (Independent) and Anglo Chinese Junior College before graduating from the National University of Singapore with a Bachelor of Business Administration. He also holds a Master of Science in Management from the London Business School under the SAF Postgraduate Scholarship (General Development). Lim is a board member of the Anglo-Chinese Schools and the Anglo-Chinese School (Independent).

== Career ==
=== Military career ===
Commissioned as an infantry officer in December 1981, Lim converted to a commando officer in September 1982 and was a platoon and company commander in the 1st Commando Battalion. Since then, he rose up the ranks holding various command and staff appointments notably as Commander of the Army Training and Doctrine Command and Commander of 6th Division. His final appointment in the SAF was Commandant of the SAFTI Military Institute. After his retirement from the SAF, Lim was redeployed as Deputy Division Commander of 9th Division, a role created for retired Brigadier-Generals. He was a former board member of the Temasek Defence Systems Institute, a subsidiary of the National University of Singapore.

=== Public service ===
Following his retirement from the SAF, Lim joined Sport Singapore on 1 April 2011 as its chief executive officer, scaling up its operations and strategic significance in the sports sector. Since then, he has gradually become a leading voice in the sports scene in Singapore as head of Sport Singapore as well as the chairman of the Singapore Southeast Asian Games organising committee, where he manages sporting activities and oversees key projects involving sports, sometimes taking rather tough views to put his point across. After the 2016 Rio Summer and Paralympics Olympics, Lim said that Sport Singapore would continue to optimize their resources to balance both high performance sport and those at the grassroots levels.

== Personal life ==
Lim is married to Jane. They have four children.

== Honours ==
- Public Administration Medal (Military) (Silver), in 2006.
- Public Administration Medal (Gold), in 2015.
