= The Cenotaph, Singapore =

War memorial in Esplanade Park, Singapore

The Cenotaph
- Malay: Tugu Peringatan Perang Cenotaph; Chinese: 世界大战阵亡战士纪念碑
- National Heritage Board
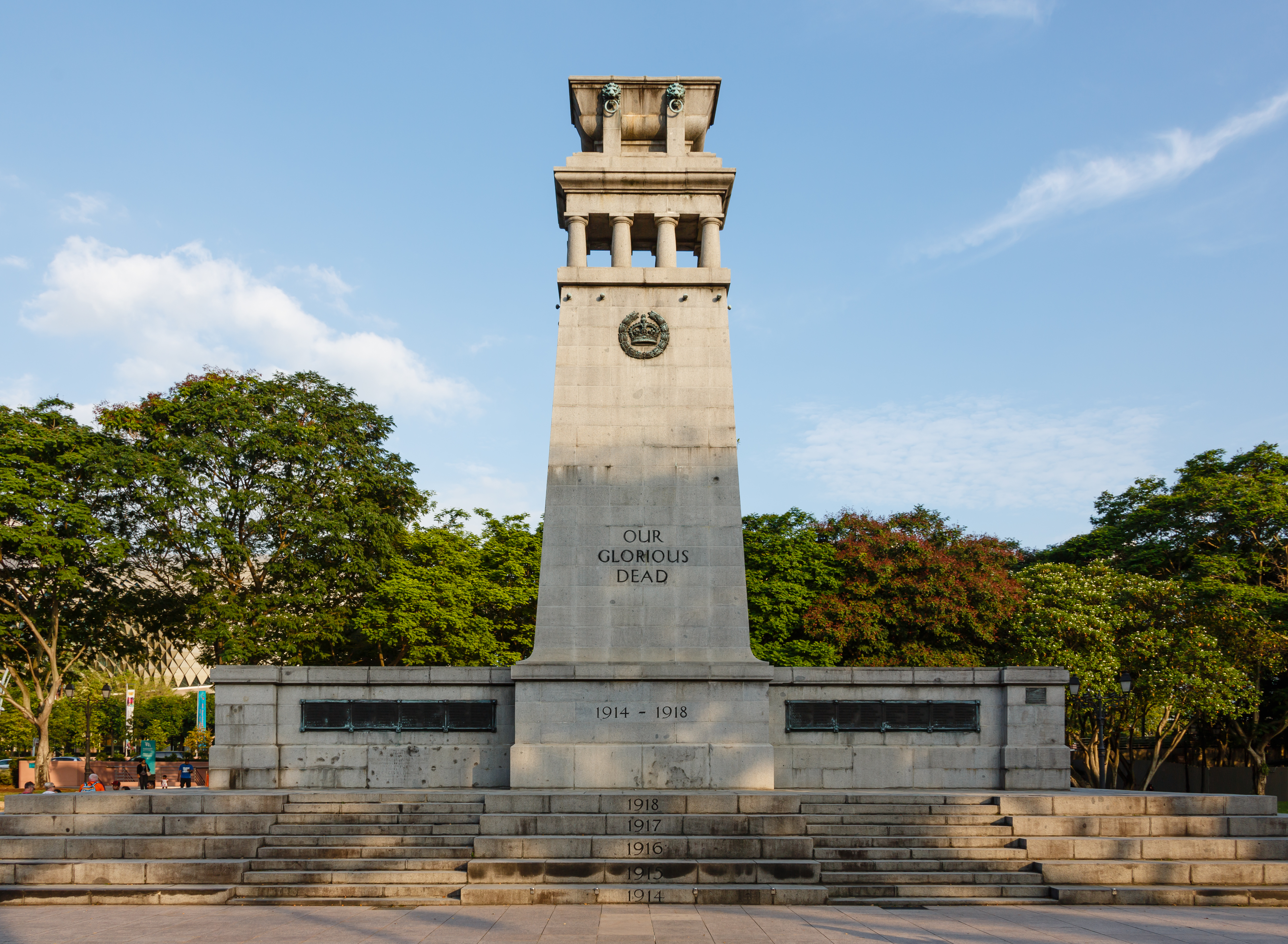
- The Cenotaph in 2015
- For those who died in World War I (WWI) and World War II (WWII)
- Unveiled: 31 March 1922; 104 years ago
- Location: 1°17′25″N 103°51′13.3″E; Esplanade Park
- Designed by: Denis Santry of Swan & Maclaren
- The glorious dead and They died that we might live

National monument of Singapore
- Designated: 28 December 2010; 15 years ago
- Part of: Esplanade Park Memorials (includes Tan Kim Seng Fountain and Lim Bo Seng Memorial)
- Reference no.: 63

The Cenotaph (initially called the Singapore War Memorial and the Straits Settlement Memorial) is a war memorial located in Esplanade Park, Singapore. It is the first war memorial constructed in Singapore and the only one in the country to commemorate those from the Straits Settlements who died in World War I (WWI) and World War II (WWII). Historically, Remembrance Day and ANZAC Day ceremonies have been held at The Cenotaph.

Plans for a memorial to honour those from the Straits Settlements who died in WWI were first considered in 1918. Four designs were submitted to a committee, with the winning design being inspired by London's Cenotaph. Its foundation was laid by Governor of the Straits Settlements Lawrence Nunns Guillemard on 15 November 1920, and was untouched for over a year before construction was expedited with the assistance of Swan & Maclaren, with its last stone laid on 16 March 1922. The Cenotaph opened on 31 March 1922, where it commemorated those from the Straits Settlements who died in WWI.

There were plans to commemorate those who died in WWII introduced in May 1947 by extending and adding urns to The Cenotaph as well as building a public park around it. The extension and urn plans were initially shelved in September 1948 due to a lack of public interest, though were approved in July 1950. Works for those plans began in August and was completed by 29 April 1951. The Cenotaph was collectively gazetted as a National monument alongside the Lim Bo Seng Memorial and Tan Kim Seng Fountain as the "Esplanade Park Memorials" on 28 December 2010.

Designed by Swan & Maclaren, it is a replica of The Cenotaph in Whitehall, London. The front of the memorial commemorates those who died in WWI whilst its back focuses those who died in WWII. Both sides feature inscriptions on the structure in Singapore's four official languages and the years of their commemorated war on the steps leading up to The Cenotaph.

== History ==
Plans for a public memorial to honour those from the Straits Settlements who died in World War I (WWI) were first proposed in December 1918 by the Executive Council of the colony, though progress was slow. It was initially believed that the new memorial was to replace the Dalhousie Obelisk, but its location was later moved to Esplanade Park where it would face the seafront. By May 1920, four designs were submitted to the government committee, with the committee preferring a design that would be modelled after the war memorial in London. It was reported that when the designs were first presented, there were complaints as they came from a private firm, and if picked would harm architects in the public service. A contest was subsequently held, with the original design winning.

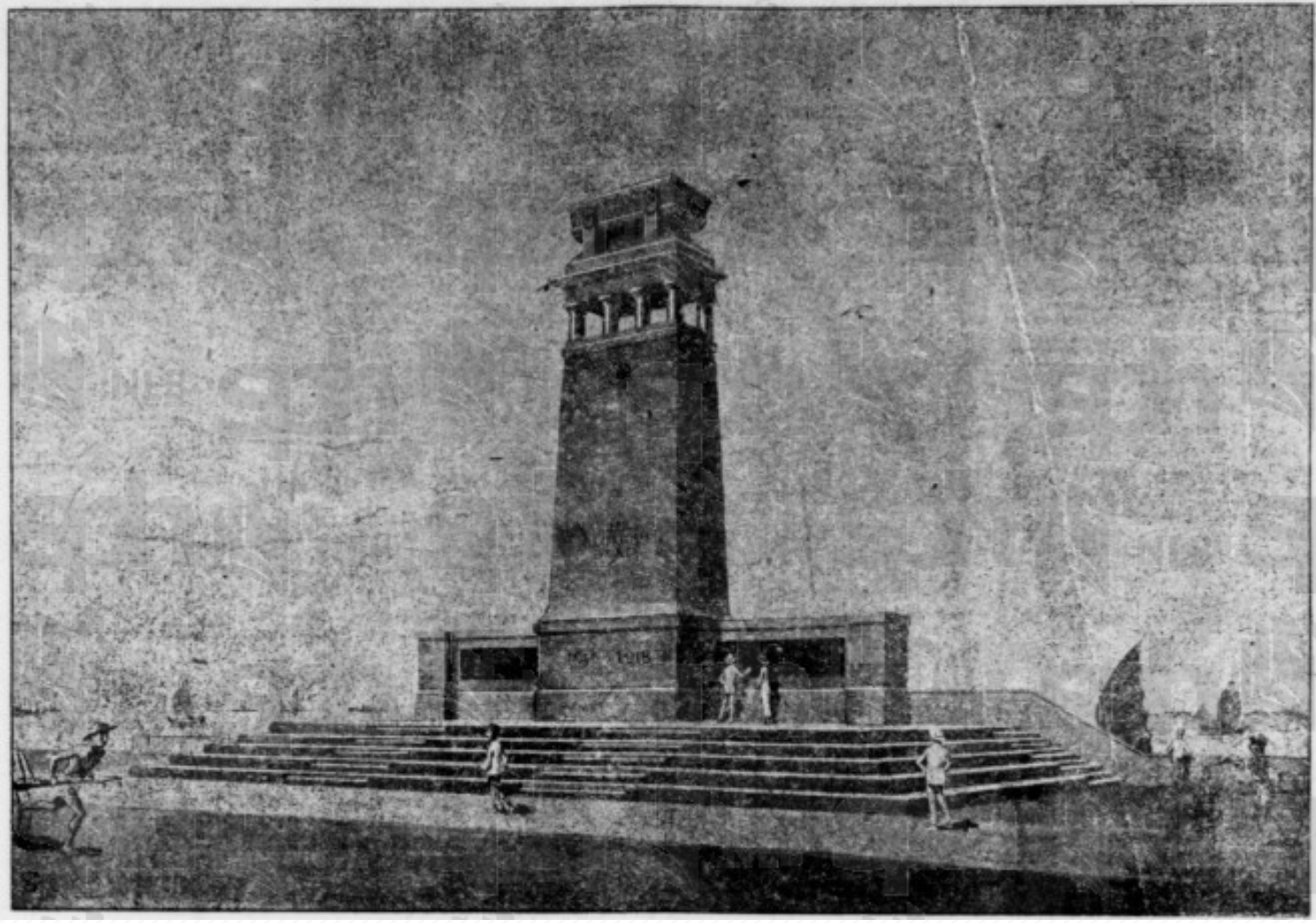
A graphical model of the original Cenotaph, dated 1920

The foundation stone for the memorial was laid by Governor of the Straits Settlements Sir Lawrence Nunns Guillemard on 15 November 1920. In attendance was the visiting French Premier Georges Clemenceau and general officer Major-General Dudley Howard Ridout. During the ceremony, a military chaplain blessed the stone. There was also a brief award ceremony to honour those who fought in WWI. It is noted by Clay Eaton of Columbia University that "for more than a year, the foundation stone stood alone on the waterfront", possibly due to economic issues. The issue, along with the increased cost of the minimum first tender, was raised to Legislative Council in October 1921. Swan & Maclaren offered to build The Cenotaph for $125,000, which was accepted by the council. On 16 March 1922, the last stone for The Cenotaph was laid, though it was reported that there was still remaining work left, such as the steps leading up to the structure, its parapet in the rear, and paving works. As part of his Asia-Pacific tour, Prince Edward of Wales unveiled The Cenotaph on 31 March 1922, with the monument honouring the 124 soldiers from the Straits Settlements who died in WWI. Eaton notes although Singaporeans used the term "Cenotaph" to describe the form of the Straits Settlements War Memorial, after the opening ceremony, the term "'Singapore Cenotaph' superseded the monument’s original name". In the 1920s, a plaque was added to commemorate French police and military who died suppressing uprisings in Cochinchina. Armistice Day ceremonies were held at The Cenotaph from 1922 until 1946 – briefly ceasing during the Japanese occupation of Singapore – with those who died in World War II (WWII) being honoured. After 1946, Armistice Day was replaced by Remembrance Day to commemorate those who died in WWII.

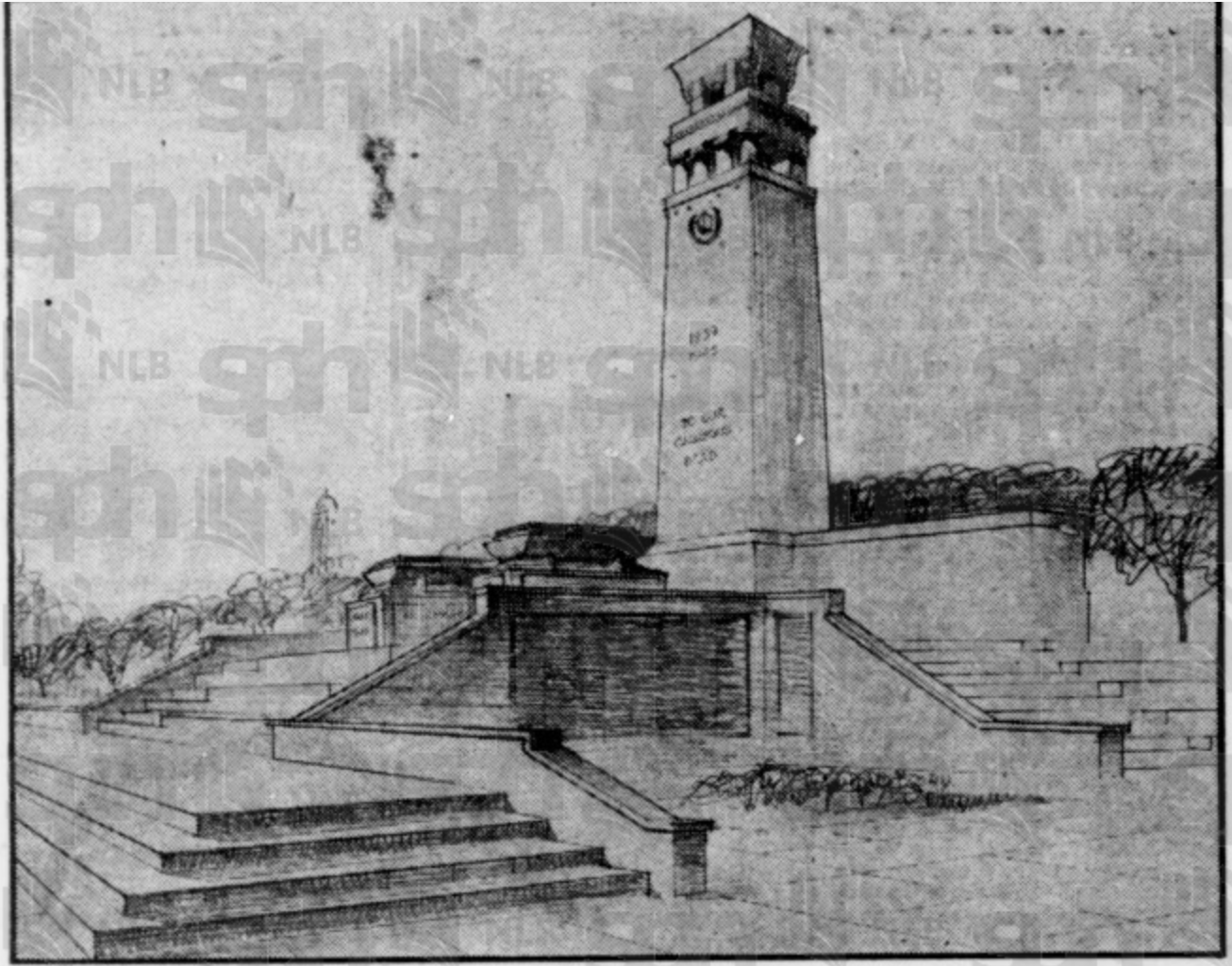
A drawing detailing the 1947 Cenotaph plan. The urns are at the front of The Cenotaph.

By 21 May 1947, there were plans to expand The Cenotaph's base between Connaught Drive and the sea from the Singapore River to the Stamford Canal, along with including two urns containing the ashes of an unknown soldier and an unknown civilian of an unknown race. Plans were also in discussion to establish a public park surrounding The Cenotaph, with it serving as its centrepiece. These plans were subsequently approved by 24 May. However, it was reported that there was a lack of interest in the extension and urn plans, despite publicity in the media and pamphlets handed out detailing said plans, resulting it to be shelved in September 1948. Nonetheless, by 21 July 1950, the plans were subsequently approved, with works beginning on 3 August by tearing down the parapet. The expansion works were finished by 29 April 1951, with the expansion plans costing $400,000 in total. From 1953 onwards, leaders from Singapore's religions started conducting prayers at The Cenotaph.

On 28 December 2010, The Cenotaph, along with Lim Bo Seng Memorial and Tan Kim Seng Fountain, were collectively gazetted as the "Esplanade Park memorials" by the Preservation of Monuments Board as a National Monument since they "honoured individuals for their contributions to the community". On 23 April 2013, The Cenotaph was vandalised with the word "DEMOCRACY" sprayed on it, along with the crossing out of the "1914 to 1918" text, which reportedly caused outrage amongst many Singaporeans. Six days later, security guard Mohamad Khalid Mohamad Yusop was arrested and charged with one count of vandalism under the Vandalism Act. A district court on 26 August ordered Khalid to pay S$208 (2013) (US$166.23) for the cost of repairs, in addition to sentencing him to three months' jail and three strokes of the cane.

== Details ==
The Cenotaph is a war memorial located in Esplanade Park, which is near Connaught Drive. Despite its name, it is technically not considered a "cenotaph". Designed by Denis Santry of Swan & Maclaren, it is a replica of The Cenotaph in Whitehall, London. The Cenotaph is around 60 feet (18 m) tall and made of local granite. Several military remembrance ceremonies have been held at The Cenotaph, such as Remembrance Day (formerly Armistice Day) and ANZAC Day.

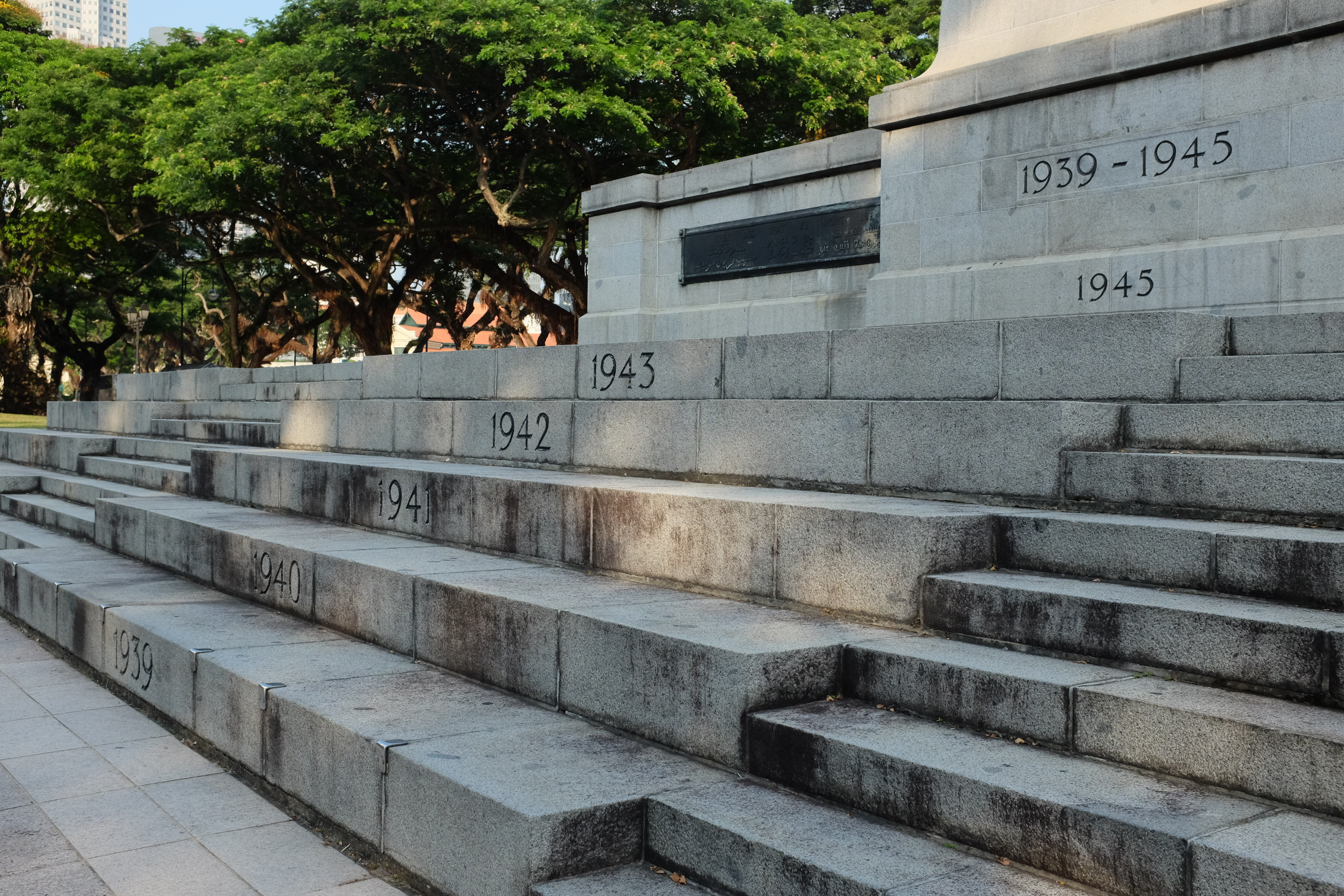
The steps of The Cenotaph, featuring multiple years

It is the first military memorial in Singapore and the only one in the country to commemorate individuals who died in both World Wars. The Cenotaph is described to be simple, yet stately, and was allegedly "wrought with the aid of just one hammer and chisel". The top of The Cenotaph features a bronze sarcophagus with bronze handles modelled after the head of lions. The Cenotaph has two wings, with both sides of the memorial featuring 14 pylons, 4 of which are big and the rest are miniature, depicting prominent WWI battles such as at Gallipoli, France, and Palestine. Each step of the original flight of stairs leading up to The Cenotaph lists a year representing the duration of WWI in chronological order. At both sides, the memorial has an inscription on its base reading:

The Glorious Dead

The front side has bronze plaques on both wings detailing the 124 casualties in WWI who originated from the Straits Settlements, which include 4 catholic priests. The right of the wing has the following inscription in French:

Les Anciens Combatants de Cochinchine a Leurs Commrades Brittainques Tombes au Champ de Honneur Saigon le 21 Mars 1924

When The Cenotaph was expanded as part of the 1950 plan, its back was modified to be dedicated to those from the Straits Settlements who died in WWII. Its steps also have the years of WWII, albeit with the years "1944" and "1945" on The Cenotaph's base. The back has a tablet the following inscription in Singapore's official languages:

They died that we might live.

Unlike the front, the memorial does not have a set of plaques listing the names of those who died in WWII. Both sides features the symbol of the crown colony, a bronze medallion with a laurel wreath enclosing a crown, which is what those soldiers rallied to. Those wreaths, as well as the handles on the sarcophagus, were sculpted with the help of Swiss sculptor Rudolf Wening, who happened to be in Singapore when The Cenotaph was under construction between 1920 and 1922.

== See also ==
- The Cenotaph, London
- National monuments of Singapore
