= Mosaic Music Festival =

Music festival in Singapore

Coordinates: 1°17′23.6″N 103°51′18.3″E

- Genre: Multi
- Dates: March
- Location: Singapore
- Years active: 2005-2014
- Founders: Esplanade
- Website: Official website

Mosaic Music Festival was an annual 10-day-long music festival in Singapore that featured both local and overseas acts. From 2005-2014, the festival showcased a variety of music genres, ranging from indie-folk to hip-hop. It aimed to provide a platform for interaction between Singapore and International artists. The performances were held at various venues at the Esplanade - Theatres on the Bay.

== History ==
Launched by the Esplanade in 2005, the festival has since garnered good reviews in regional newspapers such as Thailand's The Nation, Hong Kong's South China Morning Post and Malaysia's The Star. The 10-day fiesta in March 2007, drew about 90,000 people, compared to last year's 80,000 and 2005's 60,000. The Festival featured over 100 performances and 60 percent of those were free. Headline international acts include singer songwriters Rickie Lee Jones and Rachael Yamagata, jazz band Duke Ellington Orchestra, blues group Buddy Guy and rock musicians Yo La Tengo. - CNA/ms Since its inception three years ago, Mosaic has become an anticipated event in the annual music calendar. Audiences started enquiring about tickets to this third festival as early as October the previous year.

After 10 years, the Esplanade retired the Mosaic Music Festival in 2014, although ad-hoc concerts will still be held under the Mosaic brand.

== Programme ==
Established in 2005 as a soul- and jazz-focused event that primarily attracted an older audience, the festival subsequently expanded its musical programme to include genres such as indie folk, folk rock, Afrobeat, ska, pop and R&B. The March 2007 edition featured approximately 400 artistes from 17 countries.

The festival includes a programme of free music both indoors and outdoors at the Music Station. Both local band such as Beat Lab and Gan Ainm play for the crowds strolling the esplanade as well as regional bands such as Dina (Malaysia) and Tofu (Indonesia). Another new feature is concerts at the 11th hour. This is the first time performances are going to be staged so late - an hour before midnight.

== Venues ==
=== Heineken Music Club ===
The Heineken Music Club is a venue at Esplanade’s annual Mosaic Music Festival.
