= Esplanade Park, Singapore =

Park in Singapore

Esplanade Park
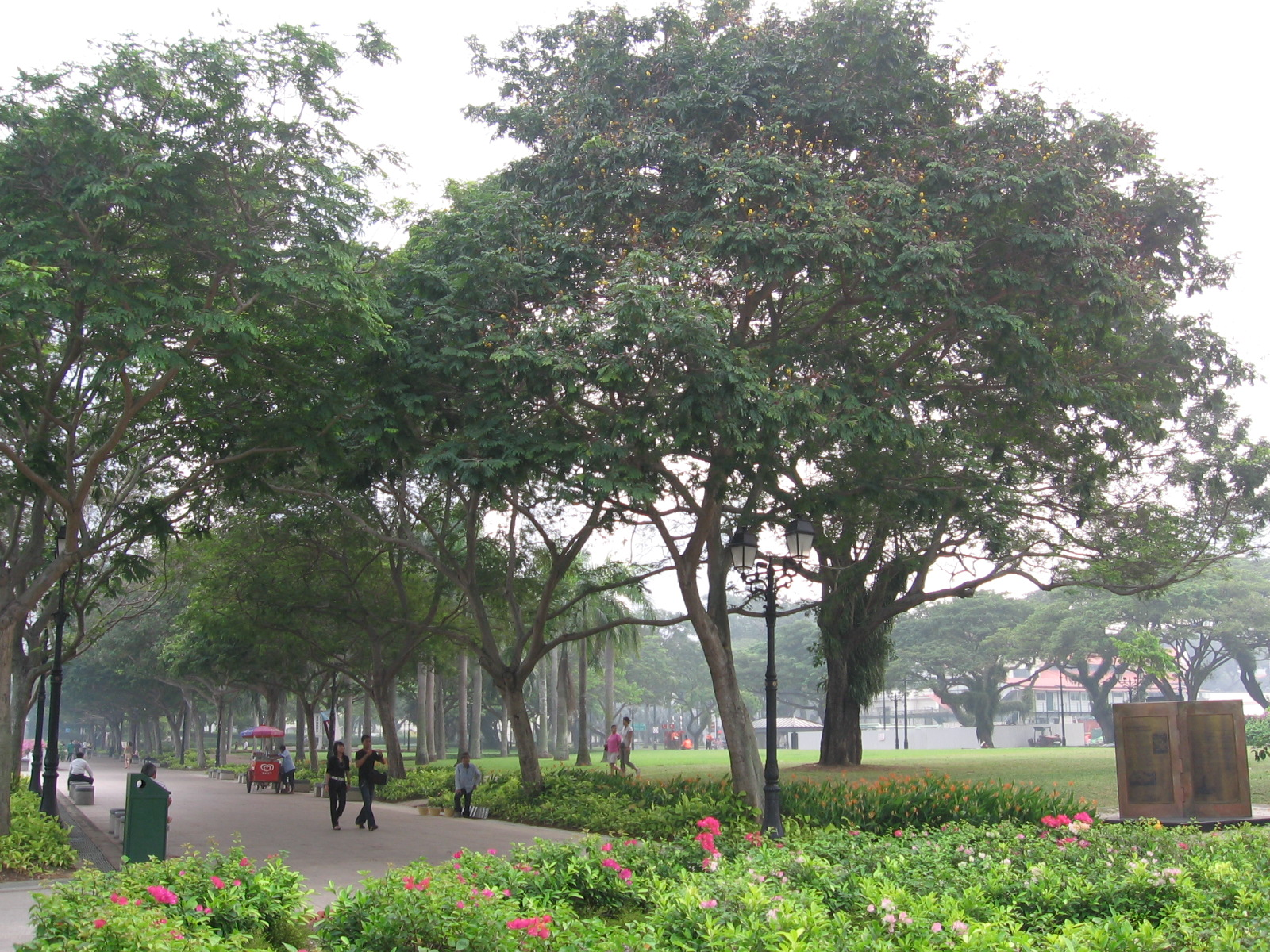
- Esplanade Park, Singapore. The pedestrian promenade on the left is Queen Elizabeth Walk. The plaque on the right, erected by the National Heritage Board, marks the former Indian National Army Monument site.

- Location within Singapore
- Type: City and heritage park
- Location: Esplanade, Singapore
- Coordinates: 1°17′23.65″N 103°51′13.32″E
- Area: 2.4 hectares (24,000 m^{2})
- Created: 1943; 83 years ago
- Operator: National Parks Board
- Status: Opened
- Website: Esplanade Park

Esplanade Park is a park located at the Esplanade area within the Downtown Core district of Singapore.

== History ==
Built in 1943 when Singapore was ruled by Japan, the Esplanade Park is one of the oldest parks in Singapore. The park was redeveloped in 1991. Many historical landmarks are located at the Esplanade Park, including Queen Elizabeth Walk, the former Indian National Army Monument site, The Cenotaph (completed in 1922), Tan Kim Seng Fountain (moved here in 1925 from Fullerton Square), and the Lim Bo Seng Memorial (which was unveiled in 1954).

The Esplanade Park is bounded by Connaught Drive, Stamford Road, Esplanade Drive and the mouth of the Singapore River.

== In popular culture ==
The park is featured in HBO series Westworld, as part of the third season. In recent years, Esplanade Park has become a gathering point for Burmese expatriates based in Singapore, particularly on Sundays.

== See also ==
- Esplanade Bridge
- Esplanade – Theatres on the Bay
- List of parks in Singapore
