= Queen Elizabeth Walk =

Promenade in Singapore

Coordinates: 1.2880°N 103.8508°E

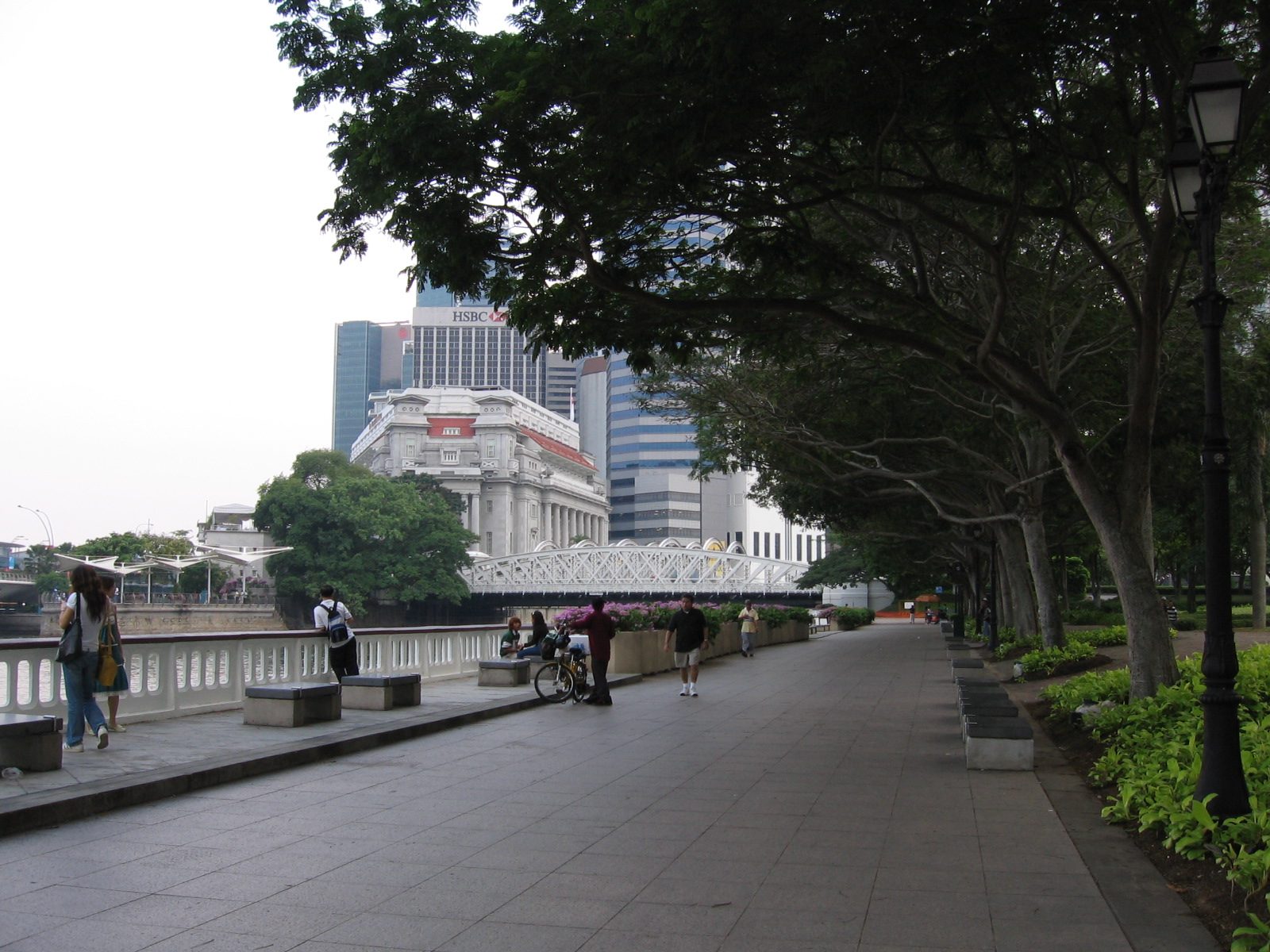
Queen Elizabeth Walk, Singapore

The Queen Elizabeth Walk is a promenade located at the Esplanade Park within the Downtown Core district of the Central Area of Singapore.

== See also ==
- History of Singapore
