= Connaught Drive =

Former road in Singapore

Coordinates: 1°17′24.61″N 103°51′12.82″E

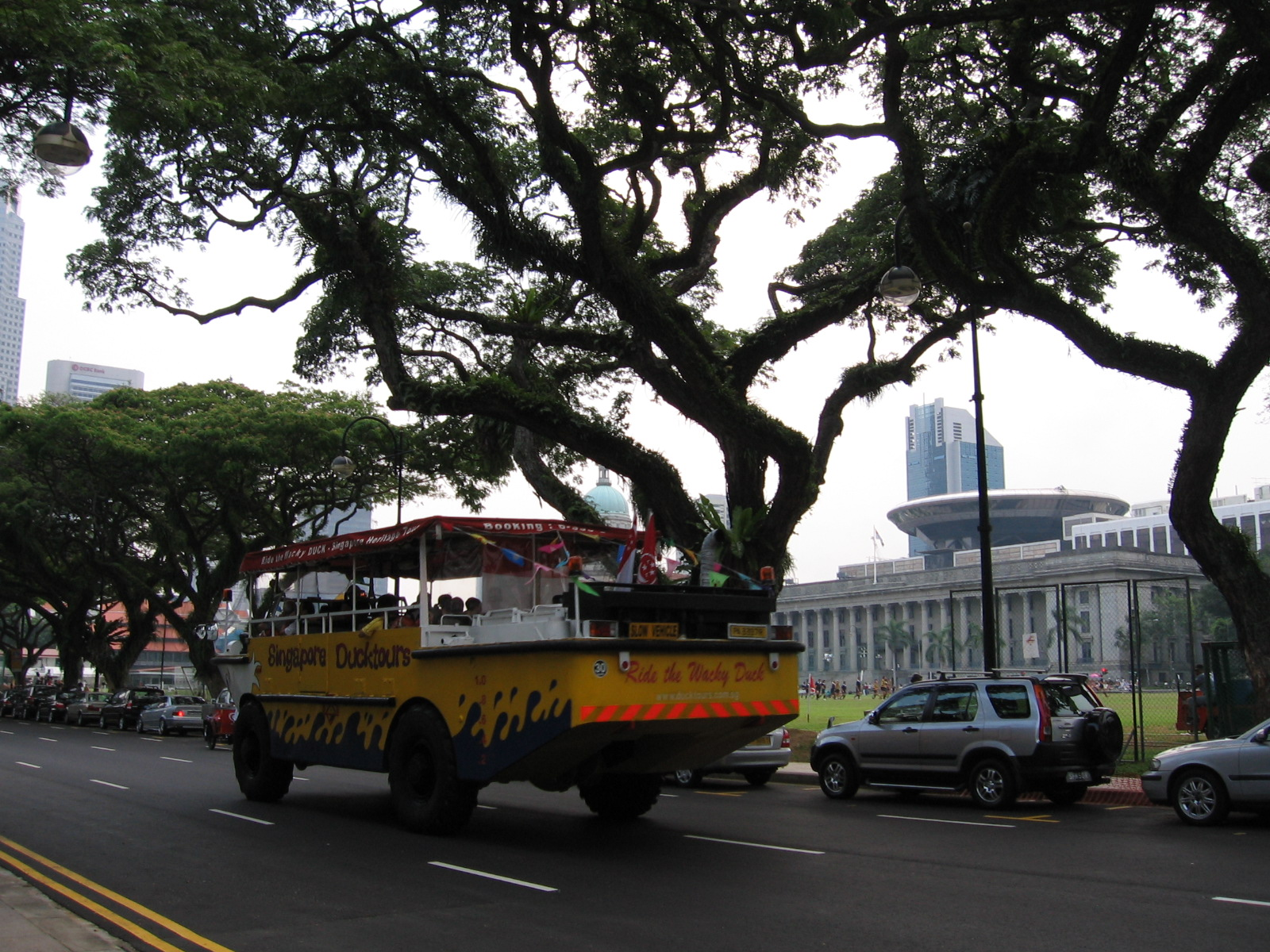
A Singapore Ducktours amphibious vehicle on Connaught Drive in 2006

Connaught Drive (Note: Chinese: 康乐通道; pinyin: Kānglè Tōngdào. There is no official translation in Malay or Tamil, and the English name is retained in its original form in both languages.) was a one-way road situated within the Downtown Core of Singapore, connecting Stamford Road to Fullerton Road along the northern bank of the Singapore River. Flanked by prominent landmarks, Esplanade Park lay to its left while The Padang bordered its right. Prior to the opening of the Esplanade Bridge in 1997, Connaught Drive served as a principal thoroughfare for vehicular traffic travelling from Marina Centre and Nicoll Highway across the river into the civic district.

== History ==
On 5 November 2021, it was announced that Connaught Drive would be fully pedestrianised by the end of that year to facilitate a more walkable civic district. Following its closure to vehicular traffic, all vehicles previously using the route were redirected to the Esplanade Bridge. This change happened on 26 December that year.
