= The Songs We Sang =

- Film poster
- 我們唱著的歌
- Directed by: Eva Tang
- Produced by: Eva Tang
- Distributed by: Golden Village
- Release dates: 29 November 2015 (SGIFF); 24 March 2016 (Singapore)
- Running time: 128 minutes
- Country: Singapore
- Language: Mandarin
- Budget: $35,000
- Box office: $84,000

The Songs We Sang is a 2015 Singaporean documentary directed by Eva Tang. It is about xinyao, Singaporean folk music that was popular in the 1980s.

== Plot ==
The documentary covered the last years of Nanyang University and how it affected the Chinese educated students who graduated from there. It also documented how the poetry club in Nanyang University, before the closure of the institution, branched out to song writing, influenced by Taiwan minyao (民谣), a Taiwanese folk songs movement in the 1970s and their school campus songs (校园民歌). The history of was then chronicled from its birth in educational institutes to local success and then to commercial success.

Interviews were conducted on three different groups of people: local xinyao singers such as Eric Moo, Billy Koh, Koh Nam Seng, Liang Wern Fook, Wong Hong Mok; singers inspired by xinyao such as Stefanie Sun and JJ Lin; and local DJs who helped popularised xinyao.

The film ended with clips of footage of the free xinyao concert, with performances by various xinyao singers, held by the producers.

== Production ==
The documentary film was budgeted at $35,000. It was also supported and partly funded with a grant of 30 per cent of the original budget by the National Heritage Board of Singapore.

As part of the documentary, a free concert was staged on 6 July 2014 at Bras Basah Complex. Various xinyao singers such as Eric Moo, Roy Li, Dawn Gan and Pan Ying performed at the concert for two hours. Footage of the concert was shown in the documentary.

== Release ==
The Songs We Sang premiered at the Singapore International Film Festival on 29 November 2015. The performance was sold-out. Golden Village released it to five Singaporean theaters on 24 March 2016. It grossed $23,508 on the opening weekend and a total of $84,661.

On 8 August 2020, the film was released via Netflix.

== Reception ==
After its festival premiere, the film received positive reviews. In praising Tang's research, Boon Chan of My Paper rated it 4.5/5 stars and wrote, "The Songs We Sang is a labour of love that puts our stories front and centre." Tan Kee Yun of The New Paper rated it 4/5 stars and called it "truly a gem of local cinema", as it avoids the melodrama associated with That Girl in Pinafore.

Her World rated it as one of the best Singaporean films of 2015.
