= Crescendo (TV series) =

Singaporean TV series

- Also known as: Our Story (我們的故事)
- 起飛
- Genre: Musical
- Written by: Wawa Creative Team 哇哇創作組
- Directed by: Canter Chia 謝光華 何恕; Chen Yi You 陳憶幼
- Starring: Christopher Lee; Tay Ping Hui; Darren Lim; Jacelyn Tay; Cynthia Koh; Ann Kok
- Opening theme: 好想告訴你 by A-do
- Ending theme: 1) 夢想起飛 by Olivia Ong; 2) 静静看着你 by Chriz Tong; 3) 快樂年輕人 by Gavin Teo (No commentaries for News Tonight)
- Country of origin: Singapore
- Original language: Mandarin
- No. of episodes: 30

Production
- Producers: Molby Low 劉健財; Canter Chia 謝光華
- Production locations: Singapore; Taiwan
- Running time: approx. 45 minutes
- Production company: Wawa Pictures

Original release
- Network: Mediacorp Channel 8
- Release: 23 October – 3 December 2015

Related
- Live Your Dreams (大大的梦想) (2021)

Crescendo (Chinese: 起飛) is a Singaporean musical drama produced by the production company Wawa Pictures and telecast on MediaCorp Channel 8. It stars Christopher Lee, Tay Ping Hui, Darren Lim, Jacelyn Tay, Cynthia Koh and Ann Kok.

The series is set against the backdrop of the Xinyao Movement, synonymous with the pursuit of dreams of a young generation of Singaporeans in the local music industry, and a part of Singapore culture many still hold dear.

== Cast ==
=== Main cast ===
- Christopher Lee as Yang Yiwei 杨毅伟. One of the members of "Crescendo" in the late 80s who aspires to spread the xinyao movement.
  Brian Ng 黄超群 as Teenage Yang.
- Tay Ping Hui as Jiang Chufan 江楚帆. One of the members of "Crescendo" in the late 80s.
  Xu Bin as Teenage Jiang. Singing voice provided by Elton Lee 李泓伸
- Darren Lim as David Luo Dawei 罗大卫. One of the members of "Crescendo" in the late 80s. Fraser Tiong 张家奇 as Teenage Luo.

Cast	Role	Description
Jacelyn Tay	Irene Lin Meiling 林美玲	Main Villain; Teenage version portrayed by Erika Tan 陈蕙薰; One of the members of "Crescendo" in the late 80s. Arrogant and aggressive, she would unscrupulously utilize all means to attain her goals. She sparked a misunderstanding between Yafang and Chufan, resulting in their breakup, to get close to Chufan herself. Irene took advantage of this to win Chufan's attention, and they eventually got married. They later divorced after three years as Chufan was too focused on chasing his passion and neglected Irene. Returning to Singapore years later as a managing director of a venture capital company, she joined the record company as its largest shareholder. Tried to turn back her mistakes because of love in episode 28 but gave up love for career in episode 30, and sold "Crescendo" to a Chinese company
Cynthia Koh	Wang Yafang 王雅芳	Teenage version portrayed by Bonnie Loo 罗美仪; One of the members of "Crescendo" in the late 80s, gentle and trusting compared to her close confidante, Irene, who has strategically caused Chufan and Yafang to break up in the 80s, in order to get close to him herself. Yiwei, on the other hand, has accompanied Yafang after her breakup with Chufan. Yafang felt grateful and eventually married Yiwei. However, their marriage is on the rocks, following the mishap of their daughter. Helped Yiwei to strive for the local music industry in the end
Ann Kok	Shirley Deng Xueli 邓雪莉	Teenage version portrayed by Tan Chu Xuan 陈楚璇; Starting out as a member of another xinyao duet, she is famous for her performance in Encounter (邂逅). She chose to break up with her boyfriend and moved to Taiwan after she was offered a contract to further her singing career, but experienced several setbacks, and ended up singing in a rowdy restaurant for a living. David, who has kept Xueli closed to his heart since the 80s, found her in Taiwan and persuaded her to return to Singapore. On the other hand, Xueli has always felt grateful, but not love, towards David. Pregnant at episode 29; having Dawei and hers baby Reconciled with Monica in the end Singing voice provided by Chriz Tong (汤薇恩)

=== Supporting cast ===
- Dawn Yeoh as Fang Xinyi 方欣仪, a former singe. Singing voice provided by Sellyne Chai (蔡违玲). Mindee Ong was originally cast to play the role but withdrew from the drama before production starts.

Cast	Role	Description
Olivia Ong	Alixia Ong	Singer contracted under Crescendo. Has strong passion for music. She is determine to release an album, but did not have the opportunity to shine after signing with the record company. Even though she has been unable to release her own album, she has not given up. Later, Chufan helped her develop as a singer, while Yiwei brought her to Taiwan to promote her new album, but she is unable to adapt to the Taiwan's culture. She feels lost and wants to quit. With encouragement from Xueli and Wenjie, Alixia eventually gets re-contracted to an independent record company to continue her music dream. Joined Cute Little Kitty in episode 7 and went to Taiwan to further her music career
Jeffrey Xu	Xu Wenjie 徐文杰	A sound engineer at the record company, he is a cheerful and optimistic enthusiast in music. He is fond of Alixia and is always supportive of her. After knowing that Alixia has a boyfriend, he falls for Carina; Carina's boyfriend in the end
Gavin Teo 赵崇喆	Yang Chengye 杨承业	Yang Yiwei and Wang Yafang's son. He has great passion in music and has a talent for song composition. He is introduced to xinyao when trying to woo Carina. He is one of the four selected during Crescendo's auditions and given three months of training.
Tracer Wong 王裕香	Monica	Dawei's elder sister.
Zen Chong	Zhang Shixin 张世新	Reporter and younger brother of Zhang Hongying, plans to take revenge for his brother's mishap He is destined to kill Deng Xueli and destroy her reputation through reporting fake news and, along with Irene, he destroys Crescendo's reputation and causing Yiwei to quit Crescendo
Hayley Woo 胡佳嬑	Carina Zhang Tongxuan 张彤萱	A bright 18-year-old whom, under the influence of her parents, likes xinyao since young. She joins Crescendo as intern and falls for Wenjie. She is being cast for a TVC that went viral online, becoming a much sought after idol after that. She falls for Wenjie and became his girlfriend in the end Singing voice provided by Natalie Tan (陈佳琦)
Roy Li 黎沸挥	Mentor Li 黎老师	80's version portrayed by Jason Sim 沈辉 is the judge of the singing competition Yiwei, Yafang, Chufan and Xueli participated in. He continues to give advice to Yiwei in the present day.
Mei Xin 美心	Liang Meiqi 梁美琪	One of the four aspiring singers selected through the auditions held by Crescendo and given three months of training. She is later given a contract with Crescendo.
Guo Liang 郭亮	Wei Nian 魏年	Founder of Everest Investment. Intelligent, capable and practical. He grew up in poor living conditions; started his business from scratch and is currently single. He has the gift to identify high return investments. Wei Nian is Irene's boss. He holds high confidence in her abilities and understands her well. He does not want Irene to be emotionally affected at work due to unrequited relationships. Alongside Irene, he plans to take over Crescendo and remove Yiwei's contract with the Crescendo.
Charles Lee 李家庆	Wang Jianwei 王建维	One of the four aspiring singers selected through the auditions held by Crescendo and given three months of training.
Boon Hui Lu 文慧如	Tang Huiru 汤惠茹	One of the four aspiring singers selected through the auditions held by Crescendo and given three months of training.
Danny Yeo 杨君伟	Richard	Carina's father
Boon Ang 洪伟文	Zhang Hongying 张宏鹰	Teenage version portrayed by Rayner Lim 林佳陞; Deng Xueli's ex-boyfriend and Zhang Shixin's elder brother. He suffered a leg injury. Died from a terminal disease in episode 26; Encounter(邂逅) voice provided by Jacky Chew (周玮贤)
Seah Hui Xian	Melody	Dawei's niece and Monica's daughter

=== Special appearances ===
Cast	Role	Description
Samuel Chong 张永权	Master of Ceremonies 大会司仪	Emcee for "Top 10 Outstanding Youths Award"
Alfred Sim 沈志豪	Singing competition host 音乐比赛主持人	Host of a singing competition
何宇珊	Yang Chengxi 杨承喜	Xixi (喜喜); Yang Yiwei and Wang Yafang's daughter. Died while Yiwei was away in China. (Deceased)
Louis Wu 伍洛毅	Reporters	
黄彤	Reporters	
Jo Wu 吴加欣	Reporters	
方宝钏	Reporters	
庄凯喨	Reporters	
Stella Fang 冯琬心	Lounge singer 驻唱歌手	
Elton Lee 李泓伸	Lounge singer 驻唱歌手	
Hu Wensui		

== Original Sound Track (OST) ==
Song type	Song title	Performer (s)	Lyrics	Composer	Arranger	Producer (s)
Theme Song	好想告诉你	A-do 阿杜	Liang Wern Fook 梁文福		James Yeo 杨奋郁	Zennon Goh 吴剑泓
Sub-theme songs	梦想起飞	Olivia Ong	Tan Kah Beng 陈佳明	Olivia Ong & Will Peng	Will Peng	Tan Kah Beng 陈佳明
Sub-theme songs	静静看着你	Chriz Tong 汤微恩 / Natalie Tan 陈佳琦	Jo Heng 邢增华	Li Feihui 黎沸辉	James Yeo 杨奋郁	Zennon Goh 吴剑泓
Sub-theme songs	快乐年轻人	Gavin Teo 崇喆	Veron Ho 何声蕙	Michael Kek 郭渭棋	Michael Kek 郭渭棋	Zennon Goh 吴剑泓
Other songs	遗忘过去	Fraser Tiong, Brian Ng, Elton Lee; Fraser Tiong, Elton Lee; Elton Lee; Li Feihui	Muzi Lee 木子	Eric Moo 巫启贤	Wilson Tan 陈炯顺	Zennon Goh 吴剑泓
Other songs	我不难过	杨梓艺 / Sellyne Chai 蔡违玲 / Tay Ping Hui	James Yeo 杨奋郁	Lee Shih Shiong	Dayn Ng Chee Yao 黄志耀	Zennon Goh 吴剑泓
Other songs	恋之憩	Tay Ping Hui/Bonnie Loo /Olivia Ong/ Elton Lee	Liang Wern Fook		Zennon Goh 吴剑泓	Zennon Goh 吴剑泓
Other songs	遗憾	Chriz Tong 汤薇恩 / 高洁萍	Tan Kah Beng		James Yeo 杨奋郁	Zennon Goh 吴剑泓
Other songs	你的倒影	Brian Ng, Bonnie Loo / Seah Hui Xian, Jacky Chew / Elton Lee, Bonnie Loo	Liang Wern Fook		Zennon Goh 吴剑泓	Zennon Goh 吴剑泓
Other songs	心宇寂星	Brian Ng / Gavin Teo	Ken Huang 黄元成	Billy Koh	Zennon Goh 吴剑泓	Zennon Goh 吴剑泓
Other songs	邂逅	Chriz Tong/Sellyne Chai 蔡违玲 / Chriz Tong/ Jacky Chew	Huang Hui-zhen 黄惠贞	Eric Moo	Wilson Tan 陈炯顺	Zennon Goh 吴剑泓
Other songs	让夜轻轻落下	Elton Lee / Gavin Teo, Charles Lee, Boon Hui Lu, Macy Chen	Liang Wern Fook		Zennon Goh 吴剑泓	—N/a
Other songs	Endless Road	Gavin Teo	JJ Lin		—N/a	Zennon Goh 吴剑泓
Other songs	明知道	Chriz Tong 汤微恩	Mavis Hee / Tan Kah Beng	Tan Kah Beng	James Yeo 杨奋郁	Zennon Goh 吴剑泓
Other songs	写一首歌给你	Elton Lee, Erika Tan / Gavin Teo / Macy Chen / Boon Hui Lu	Liang Wern Fook		James Yeo 杨奋郁	Zennon Goh 吴剑泓
Other songs	说时依旧	Erika Tan/ Bonnie Loo / Cynthia Koh, Natalie Tan 陈佳琦	Sanmao 三毛	Liang Wern Fook 梁文福	Kee Khan Yang 纪康阳, James Yeo 杨奋郁	Zennon Goh 吴剑泓
Other songs	细水长流	Stella Fang 冯琬心/ Elton Lee 李弘伸	Liang Wern Fook		Kee Khan Yang 纪康阳	Zennon Goh 吴剑泓
Other songs	为了你	Natalie Tan 陈佳琦 /Natalie Tan 陈佳琦, Gavin Teo 崇喆 /Gavin Teo / Charles Lee	Tan Kah Beng 陈佳明	Eric Moo 巫启贤	Kee Khan Yang 纪康阳	Zennon Goh 吴剑泓
Other songs	水的话	Erika Tan	Liang Wern Fook		James Yeo 杨奋郁	Zennon Goh 吴剑泓
Other songs	一生的爱	Macy Chen 陈美心	Zennon Goh 吴剑泓	JJ Lin	Wilson Tan 陈炯顺	Zennon Goh 吴剑泓
Other songs	那一段日子	林岳正 / Tay Ping Hui	Eric Moo		Wilson Tan 陈炯顺	Zennon Goh 吴剑泓
Other songs	情谊藏心底	高洁萍, Ng Sze Min 黄丝敏/ Tay Ping Hui, Christopher Lee, Darren Lim	Jo Heng, Eric Moo	Eric Moo	Wilson Tan 陈炯顺	Zennon Goh 吴剑泓
Other songs	从你回眸那天开始	Darren Lim / Darren Lim, Chriz Tong	Liang Wern Fook		James Yeo 杨奋郁	Zennon Goh 吴剑泓

=== Soundtrack ===
Crescendo: Original Soundtrack “好想告诉你”新谣电视剧《起飞》原声歌曲特辑

Soundtrack album by Various Artists
- Released: 16 November 2015
- Genre: Soundtrack
- Length: 68:48
- Labels: Wawa Pictures, Ocean Butterflies
- Producer: Zennon Goh

A compilation album showcasing songs from Crescendo will be pre-released during the Crescendo Concert on 14 November 2015, and was subsequently released in CD-Rama stores on 16 November. It comprises 3 original songs, as well as 19 remakes of Xinyao songs.

No.	Title	Lyrics	Music	Artist(s)	Length
1.	"Longing To Tell You" (好想告诉你)	Liang Wern Fook	Liang Wern Fook	A-do	4:06
2.	"Quietly Watching You" (静静看着你)	Jo Heng	Li Feihui	Chriz Tong	4:22
3.	"Happy Youth" (快乐年轻人)	Veron Ho	Michael Kek	Gavin Teo	2:25
4.	"Forgetting the Past" (遗忘过去)	木子	Eric Moo	Elton Lee, Brian Ng, Fraser Tiong	3:50
5.	"Your Reflection" (你的倒影)	Liang Wern Fook	Liang Wern Fook	Jacky Chew, Seah Hui Xian	3:35
6.	"Encounter" (邂逅)	Huang Hui-zhen	Eric Moo	Chriz Tong, Jacky Chew	3:39
7.	"Write A Song for You" (写一首歌给你)	Liang Wern Fook	Liang Wern Fook	Elton Lee, Erika Tan	3:21
8.	"Like in the Past" (说时依旧)	Sanmao	Liang Wern Fook	Bonnie Loo	4:19
9.	"Water Tales" (水的话)	Liang Wern Fook	Liang Wern Fook	Erika Tan	1:23
10.	"Love's Refuge" (恋之憩)	Liang Wern Fook	Liang Wern Fook	Elton Lee	3:51
11.	"Starting From the Day You Look Back" (从你回眸那天开始)	Liang Wern Fook	Liang Wern Fook	Darren Lim	4:25
12.	"Friendship Lies Within the Heart" (情谊藏心底)	Jo Heng, Eric Moo	Eric Moo	Aly Koh, Ng Sze Min	4:21
13.	"Let the Night Gently Fall" (让夜轻轻落下)	Liang Wern Fook	Liang Wern Fook	Gavin Teo, Charles Lee, Boon Hui Lu, Macy Chen	2:29
14.	"Heart of Universe" (心宇寂星)	Ken Huang	Billy Koh	Brian Ng	3:22
15.	"Friendship Forever" (细水长流)	Liang Wern Fook	Liang Wern Fook	Stella Fang	3:19
16.	"I Know and Yet" (明知道)	Mavis Hee, Tan Kah Beng	Tan Kah Beng	Chriz Tong	4:32
17.	"That Period of Time" (那一段日子)	Eric Moo	Eric Moo	林岳正	2:00
18.	"I'm Not Upset" (我不难过)	Jacky Yang	Lee Shih Shiong	Sellyne Chai	5:08
19.	"For You" (为了你)	Tan Kah Beng	Eric Moo	Gavin Teo, Natalie Tan	1:25
20.	"Regret" (遗憾)	Tan Kah Beng	Tan Kah Beng	Aly Koh	1:31
21.	"Endless Road"	JJ Lin	JJ Lin	Gavin Teo	1:39
22.	"Eternal Love" (一生的爱)	Zennon Goh	JJ Lin	Macy Chen	2:04
Total length:					68:48

== Production ==
Originally, the show title was going to be "Our Story" (我们的故事). The title was changed during pre-production, possibly to avoid confusion with the movie Long Long Time Ago, which has the same Chinese title.

- Boon Hui Lu played Huiru, a singer with the same Chinese name pronunciation but in the musical, she played Irene, a totally different character.

== Crescendo the Musical ==
In 2016, it was announced that a musical based on the series, titled Crescendo the Musical, would be presented at Kallang Theatre.

== Accolades ==
Year	Ceremony	Category	Nominees	Result	Ref
2016	Star Awards	Best Programme Promo 最佳宣传短片	Delon Poh	Nominated	
2016	Star Awards	Best Theme Song	A-do (好想告诉你)	Nominated	
2016	Star Awards	Best Actor	Christopher Lee	Nominated	
2016	Star Awards	Best Drama Serial	—N/a	Nominated	
2016	Star Awards	Favourite Male Character	Christopher Lee	Nominated	
2016	Star Awards	Favourite Onscreen Couple (Drama)	Tay Ping Hui and Ann Kok	Nominated	
