= Chai Yee Wei =

Singaporean film director (born 1976)

- Born: 21 June 1976 (age 50); Singapore
- Education: Catholic High School; Catholic Junior College
- Occupations: Film director; writer; producer; businessman
- Spouse: Diane Chan
- Awards: Grand Prix George Lucas Award

Chinese name
- Traditional Chinese: 蔡於位
- Simplified Chinese: 蔡于位
- Hanyu Pinyin: Cài Yúweì

Chai Yee Wei (born 21 June 1976) is a Singaporean film director, writer and producer. He is also the founder of Mocha Chai Laboratories and A Little Seed, an authorised Apple iTunes aggregator. He also founded production company Hot Cider Films, Japanese curry specialty restaurant Curry Favor, as well as an IT company and wedding photography businesses.

== Career ==
Chai's debut feature film Blood Ties, which premiered on 10 September 2009, was funded under the Singapore Film Commission's New Feature Film Fund. Chai had also made countless comedy shorts, such as Loser, Lau Sai (Diarrhoea) and My Blue Heaven, amongst others.

Twisted, released in Malaysia in 2011, is Chai's second feature film. It won "Best Feature" at the 2012 Detroit Nightmare Film Festival and was selected for the 2012 Rhode Island International Horror Film Festival, 2012 Grimm Up North International Horror Film Festival, and 2012 Focus on Asia Fukuoka International Film Festival.

That Girl in Pinafore is Chai's third feature film released in 2013. Set in the 1990s, it is a comedy-musical starring Daren Tan, Julie Tan, Hayley Woo and Jayley Woo. The film premiered at the 2013 Shanghai International Film Festival and shown at the Festival Nits de Oriental, Taoyuan International Film Festival, and Focus on Asia Fukuoka International Film Festival.

The Voice of China producers watched That Girl in Pinafore in Shanghai and sought Chai to direct a music movie, Voice of China Turn You Around, with the singers from the first two seasons of The Voice of China. The film was pre-sold to the Fox TV Network and had a limited theatrical release in China in January 2014.

In June 2018, Chai was awarded the Grand Prix George Lucas Award at the 20th Short Shorts Film Festival & Asia for his short film Benjamin's Last Day At Katong Swimming Complex, a wistful, nostalgic story about a young boy's sexual awakening, as well as the impact on our heritage triggered by Singapore's rapid urban development. It premiered at the Singapore International Film Festival in November 2018.

That same year, Chai was chosen to be one of 15 Directors to be part of "15 Shorts: Films For Good" organised by the National Volunteer and Philanthropic Centre. His film Sister is based on the friendship between Catholic nun Sister Gerard and convicted murderer Catherine Tan.

== Personal life ==
Chai was educated at Catholic High School and Catholic Junior College. He is a huge fan of Xinyao, and his interest in this influenced him to create the 2013 film That Girl in Pinafore.

== Filmography ==
=== Film ===
- Blood Ties (2009)
- Twisted (2011)
- That Girl in Pinafore (2013)
- Benjamin's Last Day at Katong Swimming Complex (2017; short film)
- Sister (2019; short film)
- Wonderland (2023)

=== Television series ===
- Voice of China - I Want You (2014)
- Mr. Midnight: Beware the Monsters (2022)
- Venus on Mars (2023)
