= Lin Yingxiong =

Lin Yingxiong (林英雄) may refer to:

- Lin Yingxiong, a character in Singaporean television series My Secret App
- Lim Young-woong (born 1991), South Korean ballad, pop and trot singer
