= Blood Ties (2009 film) =

- Directed by: Chai Yee Wei
- Starring: Joey Leong, Cheng Pei-pei, Kenneth Tsang
- Edited by: Yim Mun Chong
- Distributed by: Golden Village Pictures
- Release date: September 10, 2009 (Singapore)
- Country: Singapore
- Language: Chinese

Blood Ties (还魂; Taiwan name:頭七還魂夜) is a Singaporean thriller film in Chinese directed by Chai Yee Wei and released in 2009.

== Plot ==
Gangs bribed policeman Shun's boss Woon sir and friend Shen, then raped his wife Ah Mei and killed both. Within the week after their death, Shun and Ah Mei controlled the bodies of Shun 's younger sister Qing and mother Madam Lee to take revenge on those people involved.

== Cast ==
- Joey Leong as Qing
- Cheng Pei-pei as Madam Lee
- Kenneth Tsang as Woon Sir
- David Leong as Shun
- Vincent Tee Soh Poh as Shen
- Gary Yuen as Toh(Priest)
- Maggie Tan as Ah Mei
- Low Hoong Yee as Chen Ge
- Lee Kwok Toong as Liang Ge
