= Wong Hong Mok =

Singaporean musician

Wong Hong Mok (better known as Huang Hongmo 黄宏墨) is a Singaporean xinyao singer-songwriter, music producer and professional photographer. He, along with Liang Wern Fook and others are seen as pioneers of the genre.

== Career ==
=== Musical career ===
His singing style has been described as bold and unrestrained but, unlike other xinyao singer-songwriters, writes about nature, and self. He has said that this comes from the time in his life when he spent a lot of time near the sea.

Crediting his father for his love of music, Wong is a self-taught musician; his family was too poor for him to be able to take music lessons. As well as playing the guitar, he taught himself how to play the harmonica and the piano.

As he grew up, he found most of the music that was around in the Chinese music scene, meaningless; however, inspired by the music of Lo Ta-Yu from Taiwan, whose writings he found more meaningful, he started to write his own songs and, in 1982, wrote his first song, "Discard" (抛). His songs were first heard on the radio in 1984 on the Chinese radio programme New Voices, New Songs (歌韵新声), which was seen as a gateway for young musicians.

In 1990, Wong won the Best Lyrics Award for the song "Childhood Homeland" (童言故乡). He later released his first album Wild Man's Dream (野人的梦). By 1992, his album sold 30,000 copies which was considered impressive as the Singapore market for local singers are usually around 20,000 copies.

In 1991, following the success of his first album, Wong released his second album The Soliloquy of a Stupid Bird (笨鸟的表白).

In 1996, Wong released his third album, Cherish (惜缘), a compilation of all his works. The album took more than a year to produce as it was self funded and Wong did not have enough funds to produce the album at one go.

He won the “Best Lyrics Award” at the 1999 New Ballad Festival (新谣节). In June 2004, Wong Hong Mok was the first to represent Singapore in the 2nd Asia Music Concert (第二届中新歌会).

In 2012, Wong performed his first solo concert.

=== Other ===
Wong was a photographer for commercials in the 1990s.

== Discography ==
- "Sunset Lake Colours" (夕阳湖色)
- "Mountain Affair" (山情)
- "Final Reminiscence" (最后的惦记)
- "If You Haven't Been Here Before" (如果你不曾来过)
- "No Return" (不能回头)
- "Silence" (沉默)

Studio albums

Title	Album details	Ref
The Wild Man's Dreams (野人的梦)	Released: 1990; Label: BMG Records	
The Soliloquy of a Stupid Bird (笨鸟的表白)	Released: 1991	
Cherish (惜缘)	Released: 1996; Self-published	

Singles

Title	Year	Album	Ref
"Endless Enchantment" (万种风情)	1989	Non-album single	
"Childhood Homeland" (童言故乡)	1990	Non-album single	

Songwriting credits

Year	Credit	Title	Artist	Album	Ref
1991	Lyricist	"现在还算好"	Paula Tsui	文明泪	
