= In the Name of Love (TV series) =

- 最爱是你
- Genre: Romance
- Written by: Lau Ching Poon 刘清盆; Tan Ai Heng 陈海兴; Seah Choon Guan 谢俊源
- Directed by: Su Miao Fang; Doreen Yap
- Starring: Felicia Chin; Pierre Png; Julie Tan; Ann Kok; Bryan Wong; Zhu Houren; Hong Huifang
- Opening theme: 踏破鐵鞋 by Canace Wu
- Ending theme: What I See In Love by Mayu Wakisaka
- Country of origin: Singapore
- Original language: Chinese
- No. of episodes: 20

Production
- Executive producer: Wong Kuang Yong 黄光荣
- Producer: Kwek Leng Soong 郭令送
- Running time: approx. 45 minutes (exc. advertisements)

Original release
- Network: MediaCorp Channel 8
- Release: 25 June – 22 July 2014

Related
- World at Your Feet; Blessings

In The Name Of Love (Chinese: 最爱是你) is a romance drama series produced by MediaCorp Studios and aired on MediaCorp Channel 8. The show aired at 9pm on weekdays and had a repeat telecast at 8am the following day. The series stars Felicia Chin, Pierre Png, Julie Tan, Ann Kok and Bryan Wong as the main characters of the series, it is also a mid year blockbuster drama for 2014. This series repeat telecast every Sunday at 12pm - 2pm.

== Cast ==
- Felicia Chin as Pan Xiaomin 潘小敏
- Pierre Png as Song Xinren 宋信仁, owner of an antiques store
- Julie Tan as Bai Xiaoshan 白小珊
- Ann Kok as Song Chuyun 宋楚雲
- Bryan Wong as Fang Yaoliang 方耀良
- Zhu Houren as Wang Weiguo 王伟国, employee of antiques store
- Hong Huifang as Hong Meidai 洪美黛

Rayson Tan	Lu Zhiguang 陆志光	Song Chuyun's ex Husband; Has an affair with Laura; Yu An and Alice's Father; Laura's husband	1 - 20
Ben Yeo	Wang Jiashu 王家书	Wang Weiguo & Hong Meidai 's eldest Son	1 - 20
Priscelia Chan	Lu Yuchan	Ah-Chan 阿婵; Wang Weiguo & Hong Meidai 's Daughter In Law; Wang Jiashu's Wife	1 - 20
Chen Shucheng	Bai Yongchun 白永春	Bai Xiaoshan's Father; Huang Yanqiu 's Husband	6 - 20
Richard Low	Hong Bo 洪博	Bai Yongchun's Helper	1 - 20
Lin Meijiao	Huang Yanqiu 黄燕秋	Bai Xiaoshan's Mother; Bai Yongchun 's wife	6 - 20
Youyi	Laura	Has an affair with Lu Zhiguang; Lu Zhiguang's husband; Alice's Mother	1 - 20
Li Hong 李弘	Lu Yu'an 陆宇安	Lu Zhiguang & Song Chuyun 's Son; Fang Yaoliang's godson	1 - 20
Zong Zijie	Pan Zhihai 潘智海	Pan Xiaomin's Brother; Brain Damage from fever	7 - 8, 10, 13 - 20
Hong Ling	cameo appearance	Bai Xiaoshan's Cousin	20

== Episodes ==
No.	Title	Original release date
1	"Episode 1"	June 25, 2014
2	"Episode 2"	June 26, 2014
3	"Episode 3"	June 27, 2014
4	"Episode 4"	June 30, 2014
5	"Episode 5"	July 1, 2014
6	"Episode 6"	July 2, 2014
7	"Episode 7"	July 3, 2014
8	"Episode 8"	July 4, 2014
9	"Episode 9"	July 7, 2014
10	"Episode 10"	July 8, 2014
11	"Episode 11"	July 9, 2014
12	"Episode 12"	July 10, 2014
13	"Episode 13"	July 11, 2014
14	"Episode 14"	July 14, 2014
15	"Episode 15"	July 15, 2014
16	"Episode 16"	July 16, 2014
17	"Episode 17"	July 17, 2014
18	"Episode 18"	July 18, 2014
19	"Episode 19"	July 21, 2014
20	"Episode 20"	July 22, 2014

== Accolades ==
Organisation	Year	Award	Nominee	Result	Ref.
Star Awards	2015	Best Supporting Actor	Zhu Houren (as Wang Weiguo 王伟国)	Nominated	
Star Awards	2015	Favourite Female Character	Felicia Chin	Nominated	
Star Awards	2015	London Choco Roll Happiness Award	Julie Tan (as Bai Xiaoshan 白小珊)	Nominated	

== See also ==
- List of programmes broadcast by Mediacorp Channel 8
