= December Rains =

Singapore theatre production

- Music: Liang Wern Fook; Jimmy Ye
- Premiere: Singapore
- Productions: 1996 Singapore; 2010 Singapore; 2015 Singapore

December Rains (Chinese: 雨季; pinyin: Yǔ jì) is the first original Mandarin musical written by veteran songwriter Liang Wern Fook and Jimmy Ye, directed by theatre director Alec Tok and producer James Toh. It was first staged by Brink Creative Company in 1996. The musical was restaged in 2010 and 2015 by Singapore theatre production company, Toy Factory Productions at the Esplanade Theatre by Goh Boon Teck.

== Synopsis ==
December Rains follows a pair of students heavily devoted to their motherland, China during a tumultuous period of social disorder and violent riots in 1950s’ Singapore. Against the backdrop of social unrest, family tension and friendship jealousy, this musical brings theatregoers to the post-Japanese occupation era. Protagonists, Ying Xiong and Li Qing navigate through the aforementioned obstacles in this heartwarming coming-of-age musical as audiences witness their budding, tragic love story. Anchored by an undelivered love letter written by Li Qing, this musical unveils the danger of human desires as Ming Li, the friend of both protagonists who, too, harbours feelings for Li Qing, intentionally failed to hand the letter to Ying Xiong. The unresolved misunderstanding between Ying Xiong and Li Qing caused by Ming Li continued on for 30 years until the pair finally reunited in the 1980s. This time with their daughter, whose existence was not made known to Ying Xiong before his departure three decades ago.

== Cast ==
Character	1996	2010	2015
Li Qing	Xiang Yun	Kit Chan	Chriz Tong
Ying Xiong	Boon Ang	George Chan	Andie Chen
Ming Li	Jiu Jian	Jeffrey Low	Sugie Phua
Wang Mei		Jo Tan	Abby Lai
Ah Ling		Lee Lian	Ann Lek

== Soundtrack ==
1. 我心中的雨
2. 只要你相信
3. 渺小的我
4. 今天
5. 我该怎么做
6. 必须如此
7. 我终于看到
8. 请你告诉他
9. 收起你的眼泪
10. 我以为爱
11. 抉择
12. 最幸福的事

Source :

== Production ==
December Rains is Singapore's first Broadway-style Mandarin musical which costs $500 000 to produce in 1996. Xiang Yun made her theatrical debut as the female lead Li Qing.

Goh Boon Teck of Toy Factory Productions restaged the musical in 2010 with Kit Chan and George Chan as the main lead.

In 2015, Goh restaged the musical as part of Toy Factory Productions' 25th anniversary celebrations. The restaging was done with a new cast, auditioned by Liang and Ye, and Andie Chen made his theatrical debut as Ying Xiong. The set designer was Eucien Chia who was also the set designer in the 2010 restaging. A new song, "《我在等什么》What Am I Waiting For", was also composed by Liang and Ye for the restaging.

== Critical response ==
In the initial staging of the musical, Wong Chee Meng of The Straits Times wrote that the musical "comes close to romanticising the era as a time when men sacrificed themselves for political ideals and women would do anything for love" and "at its most heartwarming, even if a bit corny, in its recreation of bygone days...". Wong concluded that it "gets rather draggy in the end when more moral perspectives are thrown in and it could do with a slicker production" but "a creditable effort in creating Singapore's own epic."

Mayo Martin of Today said the reproduction in 2010 "has an affinity with productions like Miss Saigon and Les Misérables" and Goh Boon Teck had succeeded in "constructing a visually elegant tale".

In 2015, Ng Yi-Sheng of The Straits Times said the second reproduction "holds up magnificently as a classic work of Singaporean theatre" and "arguably more moving than the recent deluge of historical musicals". Yane Usagi of Today reviewed that "themes are easy to follow — without being dumbed down — and the music is easy on the ear." and "this restaging is worth watching, as it will satisfy with its artistic reinterpretation and quality staging."

== Concert ==
In 2022, Ye adapted the musical to a concert, December Rains The Concert. The concert featured Ye, the 2015 cast of Chriz Tong and Qiao Han, Joanna Dong, Sherman Zhuo and Sugie Phua.
