= Koe Yeet =

Malaysian actress (born 1992)

- 高艺
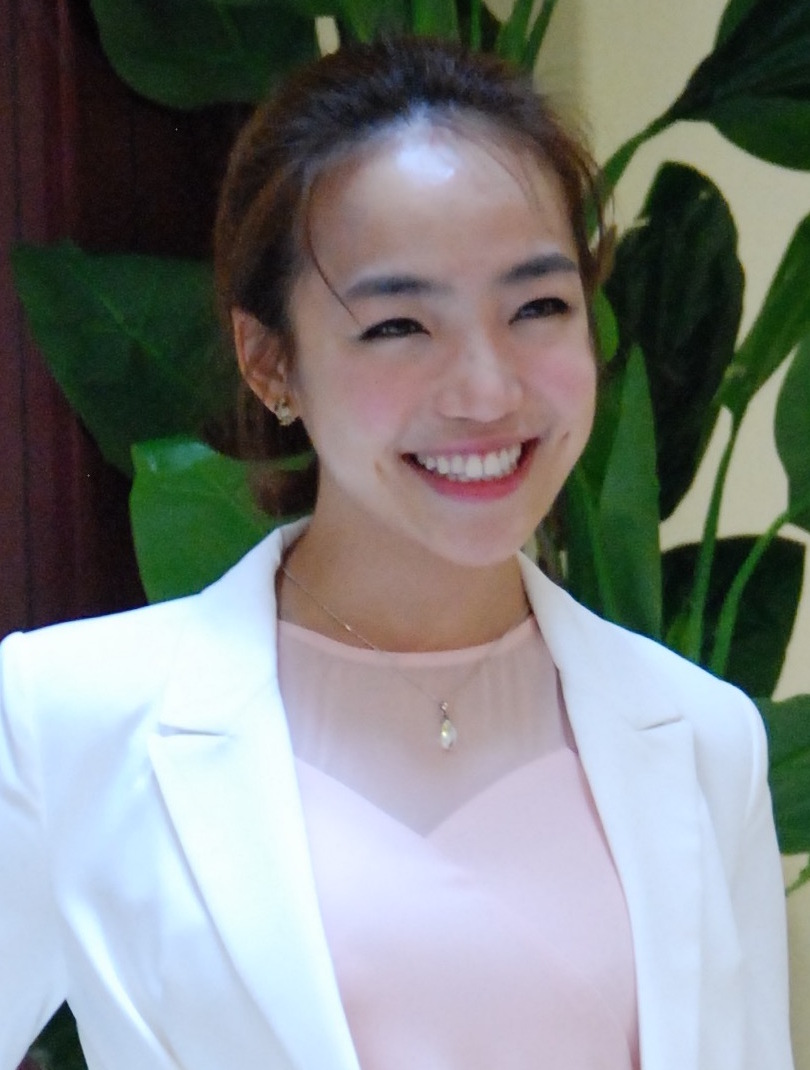
- Koe in 2016
- Born: 17 January 1992 (age 34); Selangor, Malaysia
- Education: SJKC Jalan Davidson; Catholic High School, Petaling Jaya; University of Reading (LLB)
- Occupation: Actress
- Years active: 2006–present
- Known for: Ah Long Pte Ltd; Titoudao; The Ferryman: Legends of Nanyang
- Awards: Asia Contents Awards – Best Newcomer (2021); Ten Outstanding Young Malaysians (2021)
- Website: www.koeyeet.com

Koe Yeet (Chinese: 高艺; born 17 January 1992) is a Malaysian actress. A former child actress, she is known for her role in Jack Neo's 2008 comedy Ah Long Pte Ltd. She is also known for playing the lead role of Chinese opera performer Oon Ah Chiam in the Mediacorp period drama Titoudao (2020) and its sequel Titoudao: Dawn of a New Stage (2023). The first season earned her the Best Newcomer award at the 2021 Asia Contents Awards. Koe is also a law graduate of the University of Reading.

== Early life and education ==
Koe was born in Petaling Jaya, Selangor. She began her education at Jalan Davidson Chinese primary school and completed her secondary education at the Catholic High School, Petaling Jaya.

Koe studied law in the United Kingdom. Yeet earned her law degree from the University of Reading in the United Kingdom before pursuing the Bar Professional Training Course at Manchester Metropolitan University. She was called to the bar at Lincoln's Inn in 2018 and practised law briefly in Malaysia before returning to acting full-time.

== Career ==
=== Early career ===
Koe began performing at the age of five, appearing in a number of television commercials. She made her television drama debut in 2006 with Mother's Heart and appeared in several Chinese-language Malaysian series in the following years, including Days Back Then (2007) and the Goodnight DJ series (2008, 2010).

Koe gained recognition in Singapore for her role in the 2008 action comedy film Ah Long Pte Ltd, directed by actor-director Jack Neo. She later appeared in the 2011 Chinese New Year comedy Homecoming, directed by Lee Thean-jeen, alongside Neo, Afdlin Shauki, singer-songwriter Ah Niu and Rebecca Lim.

In 2013, she starred in Wind Chimes In A Bakery, a web series sponsored by Samsung Malaysia which received a total of 4.7 million views. During this period she also appeared in a number of short films and in the 2014 feature Fantasia, and fronted advertising campaigns for brands including Tourism Malaysia and Shiseido. She has also served as a brand ambassador for Nike.

=== 2020–present ===
In 2020, Koe was cast in the lead role in Titoudao: Inspired by the True Story of a Wayang Star, a 13-episode English-language period drama produced for Mediacorp's Channel 5 and adapted from playwright Goh Boon Teck's 1994 stage play Titoudao. She played Oon Ah Chiam, a Hokkien Chinese opera (wayang) performer based on the playwright's mother. The real Oon had been sold as a child, together with her sister, to Sin Sai Hong, then Singapore's oldest opera troupe, and became best known for playing the comic male servant of the play's title. The series follows the character from a poor kampung childhood to stardom in pre-independence Singapore, through her rise in the troupe and an unhappy marriage. In August 2021 the series began streaming on HBO Go in eight Asian territories, including Malaysia, Singapore, Hong Kong and Taiwan. The series also won awards at the 2021 New York Festivals TV & Film Awards.

For her performance, Koe was nominated for Best Newcomer Actress at the 2021 Asia Contents Awards, organised by the Busan International Film Festival; that year's awards received 163 submissions from 16 countries. She went on to win the award at the ceremony in October 2021.

Also in 2021, Koe appeared in The Ferryman: Legends of Nanyang, a 36-episode supernatural series that was iQIYI's first Southeast Asian original production. A remake of iQIYI's 2014 Chinese series The Ferryman relocated to Singapore, it was co-produced with GHY Culture & Media and premiered on 24 August 2021, with a cast led by Lawrence Wong and Qi Yuwu that also included Jeanette Aw, Tay Ping Hui and Chris Tong.

In late 2022, she appeared as Flora in Kudeta, an eight-episode Malay-language political drama produced by Astro Shaw and broadcast on Astro Ria, starring Vanida Imran as the first female prime minister of the fictional country of Masraya.

Koe resumed her role as Ah Chiam in the second season, Titoudao: Dawn of a New Stage, which premiered on 14 March 2023. The eight-episode season, set from 1969, follows Ah Chiam as she leaves her original troupe and rebuilds her career with a new company led by Suan Jiah, played by Chen Liping; the cast also included Chen Yixin, Joel Choo, and Shrey Bhargava.

== Personal life ==
Koe announced her engagement on 1 December 2024. Her betrothal ceremony, held in line with traditional Chinese pre-wedding customs, took place on 22 August 2025. In September 2025, she married her fiancé, a third-generation member of the family behind the Malaysian conglomerate YTL Corporation, in Kuala Lumpur. On 24 March 2026, she announced that she was expecting her first child.

== Filmography ==
=== Television and web series ===
Year	Title	Role	Notes
2006	Mother's Heart (妈妈的心)		
2007	Days Back Then (一起走过的日子)		
2008	Goodnight DJ (声空感应之幸福玻璃球)		
2008	Exclusive (独家追缉)		
2010	Goodnight DJ 2 (声空感应2 之标本)		
2012	Mining Magnet (半边天)		
2013	Satu Hati (同心齐家)		
2013	The Liars (说谎者)		
2013–2014	Wind Chimes in a Bakery		Web series
2014	本来我应该		Web series
2018	Love At First Swipe	Jess	Web series
2020	Titoudao: Inspired by the True Story of a Wayang Star (剃头刀)	Oon Ah Chiam	Lead role; 13 episodes
2021	The Ferryman: Legends of Nanyang		iQIYI original series
2022	Kudeta	Flora	8 episodes
2023	Titoudao: Dawn of a New Stage	Oon Ah Chiam	Lead role; 8 episodes

=== Television and short films ===
Year	Title	Role
2010	BeautiFool Love (心属于你)	
2012	Sesat (迷河)	
2012	24 Hours of Horror (惊悚 24 小时)	
2013	Fortune Lemon Tree (年年有吉)	
2013	Hi, Girl (援交)	
2014	The Girl from Tomorrow (来自未来的陪伴)	Yen
2014	Goodbye September (再见九月)	
2015	Dalang (影匠)	
2015	Delete (删除)	
2015	Stay With Me (画灵)	

=== Theatrical films ===
Year	Title	Director	Notes
2008	Ah Long Pte Ltd (老师嫁老大)	Jack Neo	
2010	Cycle of Love (摇滚单车梦)		
2011	Homecoming (笑着回家)	Lee Thean-jeen	Chinese New Year film
2013	The Hunter 3D (猎首 3D)		
2014	Fantasia (爱。疯狂)		
2016	Battle Of Hip Hopera (终极舞班)		

=== Music videos ===
Year	Title	Artist
2013	"Kimi To"	Haoto
2014	"I Can" (我可以)	Diana Liu
2024	"See You" (有天会再相见)	DIOR大穎

=== Advertisements ===
Period	Client
2011–	Nike
2013–2017	Cuti-Cuti 1Malaysia (tourism)
2012–2015	Célebre Swiss (skin care)
2011–2015	Celeb Trendz (hair care)
2014–2015	Shiseido (hair care)
2015	Hotlink (telecommunication)
2022–2023	ULike (brand ambassador)
2023–2024	Spritzer (brand ambassador)

== Awards and honours ==
Year	Award	Category	Nominated work	Result	Ref.
2021	Asia Contents Awards	Best Newcomer Actress	Titoudao: Inspired by the True Story of a Wayang Star	Won	
2021	JCI Malaysia Ten Outstanding Young Malaysians	—	—	Won	
2024	McMillan Woods Global Awards	Most Promising Actress of the Year	—	Won	
