= Dawn Gan =

Singaporean singer (1963–2018)

Dawn Gan Lay Beng (Note: Chinese: 颜黎明; pinyin: Yán Límíng; Pe̍h-ōe-jī: Gân Lê-Bêng) (15 April 1963 – 22 September 2018), also known as Yan Liming, was a Singaporean xinyao singer. She was one of the pioneer xinyao singers in Singapore.

== Early life and education ==
Gan was born on 15 April 1963 and studied at River Valley High School and National Junior College.

== Career ==
In 1984, Gan signed a five-year contract with the Tony Wong Company as a singer, one of the first two solo xinyao recording singers.

Gan sang the theme song, Youth 1 2 3, for the 1986 Singapore Broadcasting Corporation (SBC) Channel 8 drama The Happy Trio. In September 1986, the Tony Wong Company ceased operations, and agreed to release Gan from her contract ahead of a clause which abrogated the contract if the company did not release a new album for her within a year from her last release. In March 1987, Gan signed with Ocean Butterflies Music.

In 1988, Gan made her acting debut in the Channel 8 drama, Song of Youth, about aspiring singers. (Note: Both sources have contradictory names for the drama. Song of Youth is the correct translated name.) She received critical acclaim for her role as an undergraduate student whose personality matches her real self and who writes lyrics for other singers. To promote the drama, SBC held a concert in which Gan was a featured performer, along with other cast members.

The same year, Gan left Ocean Butterflies Music and signed with WEA Records (now known as Warner Music Group). Production of her albums, however, continued to be done through Ocean Butterflies Music.

From 2008, Gan performed yearly at the annual Xinyao Reunion Concert series organised by TCR Music Station, until 2018. In July 2014, she performed at a xinyao concert held at the Bras Basah Complex as part of the xinyao documentary film, The Songs We Sang.

== Personal life ==
Gan was married to businessman Lawrence Chia Song Huat. They had two sons and a daughter, and lived in Hong Kong.

Gan was diagnosed with synovial sarcoma in 2013 and then early-stage breast cancer in 2014. She had five surgeries to remove four tumours and a lobe of her lung, and was deemed tumour-free in 2016. She died on 22 September 2018 in Hong Kong.

Two concerts were held in memorial of Gan, one held at the Singapore Chinese Cultural Centre on 10 October 2018 by TCR Music Station and another concert, Embracing Dawn – Farewell for Dawn Gan, at the Capitol Theatre on 15 October 2018, organised by Singapore Press Holdings' Chinese Media Group along with Singaporean record label Ocean Butterflies Music.

== Discography ==
Discography
Year	Title	Native title	Ref
1985	Girl Next Door	偶遇的女孩	
1986	Youth 1 2 3	青春 1 2 3	
1987	Popular Songs	流行歌曲	
1988	After Graduation	毕业以后	
1989	The Heart Of Dawn	黎明的心	
