= Xinyao =

Genre of songs

Xinyao (Chinese: 新謠; pinyin: Xīnyáo) is a genre of songs originating from Singapore. It is a contemporary Mandarin vocal genre that emerged in Singapore between the late 1970s and 1980s. Recurring themes of xinyao songs often include friendships, school life or teenage romance. The term xinyao is a Chinese noun composed of two characters: xīn (新), an abbreviation for Singapore, and yáo (謠), meaning song. The name is itself an abbreviation of a longer term, 新加坡年轻人自创歌謠, which translates to "songs created by young people in Singapore".

Pioneers of the xinyao movement include Wong Hong Mok, Liang Wern Fook, Dawn Gan, Eric Moo and Billy Koh, who helped lay the foundations of the genre. These individuals were also instrumental in discovering and mentoring successful Singaporean artistes who later rose to prominence in the wider Chinese pop music scene, such as Kit Chan, A-Do and JJ Lin. The Lee brothers, Weisong and Sisong, were also key figures in the genre’s development, having written hit songs not only for local talents but also for Asian pop stars including Jam Hsiao and Jacky Cheung.

== History ==
=== Birth ===
The local xinyao movement started in the early 1980s by students from secondary schools, junior colleges and polytechnics. They were influenced primarily by minyao (民謠), a Taiwanese folk songs movement in the 1970s, school campus songs (校園民歌) from Taiwan. The Taiwanese folk genre sought an authentic native Taiwan identity exemplified by songs such as "Grandma's Penghu Bay" (外婆的澎湖灣). The rise in popularity of the campus folk song especially among the Chinese students and schools came at a time of major education reforms led by Deputy Prime Minister and Education Minister Goh Keng Swee which sought to streamline and align Chinese education into the national syllabus.

Xinyao groups had their first exposure on radio and television in April 1982, on the half-hour Chinese radio programme, Our Song Writers, in April 1982. In September the same year, Nanyang Technological University's Chinese-language newspaper, Nanyang Business Daily, organised a seminar titled The Songs We Sing (我們唱著歌). The seminar revolved around discussing the trend of xinyao's emergence.

=== 1980s: Peak ===
The first group registered at Clementi Community Centre in 1983 was Merlion (魚尾獅小組), which comprised Simon Low, Kee Chee Chuan, and Koh Mui Hoe. The group, originally consisting of three people, would include twelve by the April 1985. Merlion's first public performance was during an orientation concert at Singapore Polytechnic, where Simon was a first year marine engineering student. Some of the earliest xinyao groups included The Straws (水草三重唱), which was founded in 1981 by Billy Koh, Ng Guan Seng and Koh Nam Seng. Another group would be Underpass Group (地下鐵小組), consisting of Eric Moo.

Songs such as A Step at a Time (一步一步来） written and sung by xinyao artists were popular with those born in the mid-1960s to 1970s. In 1983, the song Encounter (邂逅), a duet by Moo and Huang Hui-zhen, became the first xinyao song to chart on Yes 933's, Singapore's radio station, "Pick of the Pops" (新加坡龍虎榜) chart. In 1984, the first Xinyao album, Tomorrow We'll be 21 (明天21), launched to then record breaking sales of 30,000 copies. The album eventually led to the creation of Ocean Butterflies Productions.

On 30 July 1985, national newspaper The Straits Times announced that 100 young songwriters would present their own compositions in a two-day concert over 6 and 7 September at the World Trade Centre auditorium. The event was organised by Boon Lay Community Centre Reader's Club. By 30 August, the tickets for the concert had sold out, which would later be known as the Xinyao Festival '85. The Straits Times reported: 'The musical standard... may not have been something to shout about, but the young musicians' talents and their strong urge to create their own songs were good enough to win the day'. By the end of 1985, there were 14 xinyao groups registered with the People's Association, as well as about twenty others not registered. By 1986, groups such as Zebra Crossing, Lucky 13, Equator, Kite, tide, Partners, City, Oasis, Wireless, Compass and other names were active in the xinyao community.

Kwok Kian Chow, the People's Association's role in xinyao was to 'facilitate and co-ordinate. We [People's Association] want to create more opportunities for enthusiasts to perform, meet and grow through activities like concerts, competitions and music camps.' In addition, there was emphasis to provide technical support in management, production and administration.

There were more than 20 xinyao groups registered with a neighbourhood community centre by mid-1987. By 1988, the xinyao movement was described as 'a staple with young Singaporeans'.

=== 1990s: Decline ===
By the 1990s there was concern expressed by mainstream media regarding xinyao's perceived decline. The Young Songwriter's Society, responsible for raising money for the festival, managed only to raise SGD $20,000. This was a sharp decrease from the $60,000 raised the year before. Reports showcased that only 70% of tickets at the 1,800- seat Kallang Theatre were sold, another decrease from the 95% the previous year. This resulted in the scrapping of the Sing Music Awards due to the limited number of album releases. Xinyao was described as getting fantastic newspaper reviews but poor local support, revealing that xinyao festival album sales from 1987 to 1989 had sold below market expectations.

Many factors have been attributed to the decline in xinyao. Some attribute the stagnation and decline to the departure of the pioneers from the music scene. Another reason was attributed to the small market size in Singapore, which did not justify the then $50,000 cost on production, packaging and promotion. In addition, the small market made local talents hesitant to make singing a full-time career.

=== 2000s: Resurgence ===
By the mid-1990s there were reports of re-emergence of the Xinyao movement, alongside a 'different, more mature tone'. However, resurgence began with a reunion concert in March 2002 where xinyao pioneers such as Moo, Liang and Gan were featured. Beginning in 2002, an annual xinyao concert featuring xinyao veterans were organised with Taiwanese singers participating to promote the concert.

The revival of xinyao has been attributed to nostalgia for the era among the generations who grew up listening to that music genre. In recent times, Xinyao stirred the interest of the younger generations as well. Reality competitions such as Project SuperStar and Campus SuperStar were also organised in television with the aim of promoting xinyao culture.

== Legacy ==
=== Academia ===
Lily Kong focuses on xinyao as a construction by the youth of Singapore, by examining the phenomenon via the lens of society and culture. Xinyao was 'by youths, for youths, developed within the space of the school, away from the homogenising influences of the marketplace.' Xinyao lyrics typically have three elements: nostalgia for childhood, youth concerns, as well as social commentary on the world at the time. Kong argues also that the early xinyao groups consisted of teenagers from junior colleges that were largely isolated, that were writing songs without knowledge that there were others with similar interests.

Kong also addresses the decline of the movement, stating that while Xinyao Festival '85 had taken on the style of a school concert ceremony, by 1989 the award presentation had 'become televised and "very glitzy and hyped-up" so as to "inspire more part-time songwriters and singers to go full time, and pave the way for more recording opportunities".'. As such, Kong states that as the xinyao movement became increasingly commercialised, the irony was that xinyao's success eventually resulted in the death of the label.

=== Education ===
In 2015, a school xinyao programme was introduced by Singapore's Ministry of Education. The programme includes a singing, songwriting competition, media appreciation sessions and songwriting workshops. The aim of the programme is to enhance student's Chinese reading and writing abilities. As part of the effort to revive the xinyao spirit and to help participating students, 20 xinyao music appreciation sessions and 2 songwriting workshops were conducted by veteran xinyao songwriters - Jim Lim, Roy Li, Zhang Lesheng and Tan Kah Beng. Over 10,000 students participated in its 2017 iteration. The programme has also led to the production of SPOP Sing!.

=== Media ===
One of the very crucial and deciding factors that pushed xinyao towards its level of popularity was the increased exposure in radio stations as well as television. In 1983, the weekly half-hour radio programme Our Singers and Songwriters (歌韻心聲), started by the Singapore Broadcasting Corporation (SBC), was specially dedicated to hosting local singers. In the same year, SBC broadened its annual Chinese Talentime (鬥歌競藝) programme to include a vocal group section. Following its success, it then further expanded to include a local-composition category in 1985. As an effort to promote xinyao, the SBC also used xinyao songs as theme songs for Chinese television drama serials.

In 2007, xinyao was showcased in the Chinese-language musical If There Are Seasons (天冷就回來). The musical featured 30 of Liang's compositions, of which many were his signature xinyao pieces. In 2015, a xinyao documentary The Songs We Sang produced by Eva Tang premiered at the Singapore International Film Festival on 29 November. It was also shown on Golden Village's cinemas on 24 March 2016.

In 2018, a Singaporean reality-competition series organised by Mediacorp, titled SPOP Sing!, targets local students from Singapore in search of finding a homegrown musical talent as well as promoting local music culture of both mandopop and xinyao, as well as paying tribute to modern singers that rose to fame, such as Sing! China finalists Nathan Hartono and Joanna Dong. A competition with a similar format aired in 2013, the fourth season of Campus Superstar, also use only mandopop and xinyao music during the competition.

=== National Day Parade ===
Xinyao songs such as "Voices from the Heart" (小人物的心聲) were staged and performed during the 2014 and 2017 National Day Parade.

During his Chinese National Day Rally speech in 2014, Singapore's Prime Minister Lee Hsien Loong started off by singing to a popular xinyao tune, Small Stream that Flows Forever (細水長流) by Liang Wern Fook.

== Selected songs ==
| Year | Title | Composer | Lyricist |
|---|---|---|---|
| 1983 | 邂逅 | Eric Moo | 黄惠赬 |
| 1988 | 讓夜輕輕落下 | Liang Wern Fook | |
| 1986 | 小人物的心聲 | 吳佳明 | 溫雪瑩 |
| 1987 | 細水長流 | Liang Wern Fook | |
| 1987 | 我們這一班 | 許環良 | 吳慶康，黃元成 |
| 1987 | 歷史考試的前夕 | Liang Wern Fook | |
| 1981 | 唱一首華初的歌 | Liang Wern Fook | |
| 1981 | 沙漠足跡 | 張家強 | 林有霞 |
| 1984 | 寫一首歌給你 | Liang Wern Fook | |
| 1984 | 水的話 | Dawn Gan | Liang Wern Fook |
| 1988 | 遺忘過去 | Eric Moo | 木子 |
| 1990 | 新加坡派 | Liang Wern Fook | |

== See also ==
- That Girl in Pinafore, a 2013 comedy-musical film directed by Chai Yee Wei inspired by xinyao.
- The Songs We Sang, a 2015 documentary film about xinyao directed by Eva Tang.
- Crescendo the Musical, a 2016 musical inspired by xinyao
- SPOP Sing!, a 2018 reality-singing xinyao/ mandopop themed competition organised by Mediacorp Channel 8
