= My Secret App =

Singaporean television drama series

- 我的宝贝机密
- Genre: Family
- Directed by: 李雄伟
- Starring: Fann Wong; Darren Lim; Eelyn Kok; Hayley Woo
- Opening theme: Reach For Happiness (不平凡的幸福) by Chris Tong & Jasper Lai
- Ending theme: 1) Beautiful World (美丽世界) by Simon Ng & Boon Hui Lu; 2) I understand (我懂了) by Gavin Teo
- Country of origin: Singapore
- Original language: Mandarin
- No. of episodes: 13

Production
- Production location: Singapore
- Running time: approx. 23 minutes

Original release
- Network: StarHub TV
- Release: 2015

My Secret App
- Traditional Chinese: 我的寶貝機密
- Simplified Chinese: 我的宝贝机密
Transcriptions
Standard Mandarin
- Hanyu Pinyin: wó de bâo béi jì mì

My Secret App (Chinese: 我的宝贝机密) is a Singaporean Chinese drama series which is telecast on Singapore's free-to-air channel, StarHub TV. It stars Fann Wong, Darren Lim, Eelyn Kok & Hayley Woo as the main casts in the series. It is shown in 都会 Channel.

My Secret App is a family comedy. It is directed by Sun Junhui (Chinese: 孙俊惠). Each episode is about 30 minutes long. There are 13 episodes in the series.

== Cast ==
Cast	Role	Description
Damien Teo 张值豪	林阳乐	Lin Yangyan's Brother; App app's Owner; Lu Yunfei & Lin Yingxiong 's Son
Fann Wong 范文芳	陆云飞	Lin Yangle and Lin Yangyan 's Mother; Lin Yingxiong's Wife
Darren Lim 林明论	林英雄	Lin Yangyan and Lin Yangle 's Father; Lu Yunfei 's Husband
Hayley Woo 胡佳嬑	林阳燕	Lin Yangle's Sister; Lin Yingxiong & Lu Yunfei 's Daughter
Gavin Teo 趙崇喆	Justin	Lin Yangyan's Boyfriend
Gunalan Morgan	Raja	Lin Yingxiong's Colleague
Eelyn Kok 郭蕙雯	明嫂	陆云飞 & 林英雄 Neighbour

== Plot summary ==
Fann Wong portrays an ambititous gymnastics coach who often reflects on the achievements of her youth. However, she struggles with declining physical strength and a growing lack of self-confidence. To escape her mundane routine and job, she immerses herself in Korean dramas and daydreams about being a princess awaiting a prince's attention. Darren Lim portrays her traditional husband. Hayley Woo acts as their energetic daughter, while Damien Teo acts as their 11-year-old. Teo finds a cell phone that came from the sky. A magical alien is on the phone's app and he befriends it. They work to assist their family with various challenges, and along the way generate many comedic moments.

== Reception ==
Hong Menyan of Lianhe Zaobao said the series was his favourite of StarHub dramas that the Media Development Authority had commissioned. He wrote, "My Secret App is actually shot like a children's play, suitable for the whole family to watch together. It brings out very simple truths through a very simple plot, but the dialogue is interesting, and the alien's appearance is cute, not embarrassing." He noted that there were four primary characters, whom he all praised. He said both Darren Lim and Hayley Woo are "just right". Hong said Fann Wong "rarely plays an unappealing character, which is funny and adds points". He called the acting of Damien Teo, a child, "impeccable". Referring to Teo's interactions with the fictional alien, Hong wrote, "At such a young age, he portrayed various expressions and inner dramas while facing empty space, making it a performance full of appeal."
