= Titoudao =

Singapore theatre play, 1994

Titoudao is a play by Singaporean playwright Goh Boon Teck. It was first staged in Singapore at the Jubilee Hall Raffles Hotel by theatre company, Toy Factory Productions, in 1994. The play was restaged again in 2000, 2007, 2015 and 2024. In 2020, the play was adapted into a TV series on Mediacorp’s Channel 5 and Channel 8.

== Synopsis ==
A play trailing the encounters of a street Wayang performer, one of the few left in that generation, Titoudao is inspired by Madam Oon Ah Chiam, the mother of its scriptwriter, Goh Boon Teck. Titoudao uncovers the struggles of street opera performers in Singapore through a play-within-a-play set in the 1940s. This play reflects the gender inequality coupled with poverty faced by Ah Chiam in that era as she navigates through her career. Titoudao is the name of the most popular character, a male servant.

=== Act one ===
The first act of the show employed the approach of a play within a play to depict the hardships of Ah Chiam's family as her and her younger sister, Ah Dui had to be sent to a street opera troupe for opera training.

This act comprises scenes of Ah Chiam performing in her most successful play — Titoudao. Titoudao is a story about a reputable family's loyal servant, Titoudao and his master, Ti Boon Long. The once-glorious Ti family ended up in shambles after Boon Long's father, a top magistrate's demise. The master-servant duo were forced to embark on a trip to Boon Long's betrothed wife's family, the Teng household to seek financial support for Boon Long's imperial examination in Beijing. However, the duo's fate did not go well after Boon Long's supposed betrothed spouse, Teng Lay Kiao and her mother, Diao Si mistook them for beggars. They despised them after learning Ti family's misfortunes, ruthlessly turning down their pleas. Fortunately, the compassionate older step-sister of Lay Kiao, the complete opposite of her counterpart, Teng Swee Lian extended her benevolence to the desperate man with great ambitions.

The opening act then reverts to the reality of Ah Chiam and Ah Dui in the opera troupe as they start their first day of mentorship.

=== Act two ===
The second act unravels Ah Chiam's budding love story, providing a glimpse into her personal life outside of her wayang times. It showcases the comical romance between Ah Chiam and her friend's older brother, Thiam Hock which started out seemingly awkward and the sad reality of marriage and life with in-laws for women in that era. Despite these, Ah Chiam's undying passion for acting surpasses her obstacles, motivating her greatly in life.

The act includes a scene of the true Madam Oon Ah Chiam appearing on stage, recollecting her wayang experiences and rekindling her love for street opera. This break in fourth wall appeals to the audience, urging them to appreciate this traditional form of street performance unique to Singapore's heritage. The production concluded with a finale of the play within the play, Titoudao, with Madam Oon Ah Chiam joining the casts.

== Stagings ==
Titoudao was first staged from 5 to 8 May 1994 at Jubilee Hall, Raffles Hotel. It then toured to Cairo, Egypt from 2 to 3 September. In the same year, Titoudao was restaged for its second time at Jubilee Hall of Raffles Hotel.

In the year 2000, Titoudao's was restaged for its third time at the Drama Centre Theatre of Fort Canning Park. This third stage was brought to Shanghai, Hangzhou and Beijing in China from 18 to 31 October. It made its fourth stage from 1 to 31 March 2007 at the Drama Centre Theatre in the National Library Building. Its fifth stage was from 5 to 15 March 2015 at the Drama Centre Theatre of the National Library Building.

== First stage in 1994 ==
=== Casts ===
- Nelson Chia Sin Chiat
- Cindy Sim Sze-E
- Katrona Tan Siew Hoon
- Goh Siew Eng
- Doreen Toh Kwee Kee
- Margaret Pang Pong Que
- Matthew Chew Soon Thiam

== Television adaptation ==
In 2020, the stage script of Titoudao was adapted into a full-length English drama series, Titoudao - Inspired by the True Story of a Wayang Star, with a span of 13-episodes, initially available on the English television channel, Channel 5, starring Malaysian actress Koe Yeet, Fann Wong and Shawn Thia. It was later dubbed in Chinese in the same year and was shown on the Chinese channel, Channel 8. The adaptation won awards at the New York Festivals TV & Film Awards 2021 and the Asia Contents Awards 2021. A second season was set to air on 14 March 2023, with Chen Liping, Tay Ping Hui, Chen Yixin, Shrey Bhargava and Jason Goldwin Chang among those new cast members joining the cast, and Koe Yeet among those reprising their roles from the first season.

== Awards ==
=== Stage ===
- Best Play at LIFE! Theatre Awards 2001
- Best Original Script at LIFE! Theatre Awards 2001
- Best Actress at LIFE! Theatre Awards 2001

=== Television adaptation ===
- Program for Best Production Design/ Art Direction at New York Festivals TV & Film Awards 2021
- Best Newcomer at Asia Contents Awards 2021 to Koe Yeet.
