= Jo Heng =

Singaporean lyricist (1960–2020)

- Born: 1960; Singapore
- Died: 9 January 2020 (aged 59); Singapore
- Occupation: Lyricist

Jo Heng (1960 – 9 January 2020), also known as Xing Zenghua, was a Singaporean lyricist. She died from lymphoma, a type of blood cancer, on 9 January 2020 at the age of 59.

== Personal life ==
Heng studied in Bukit Panjang Government High School and Thomson Secondary School, and focused on Chinese composition. She worked in factories before joining Xin He Magazine.

== Career ==
She also wrote the lyrics for Andy Lau's "The Path Winds Through High Peaks" which was released in 1994.
