= Julie Tan =

Singaporean actress and video game streamer (born 1992)

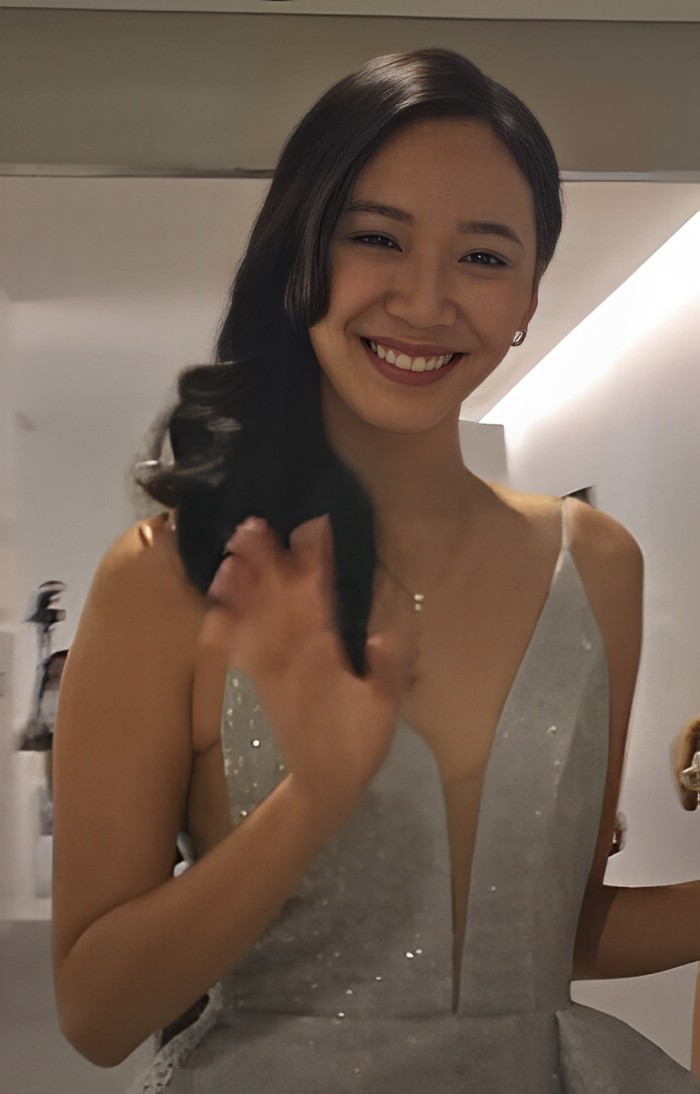
- Tan at the Star Awards 2017
- Born: 22 September 1992 (age 34); Penang, Malaysia
- Education: Nanyang Academy of Fine Arts
- Occupations: Actress; video game streamer
- Years active: 2008−present
- Agent: Li Nanxing Global
- Parent: Doris Khaw (mother)

Stage name
- Traditional Chinese: 陳欣淇
- Simplified Chinese: 陈欣淇
- Hanyu Pinyin: Chén Xīnqí
- Jyutping: Can4 Jan1 Kei4
- Hokkien POJ: Tân Him-kî
- Tâi-lô: Tân Him-kî

Birth name
- Traditional Chinese: 陳紹茵
- Simplified Chinese: 陈绍茵
- Hanyu Pinyin: Chén Shàoyīn

Julie Tan Shao Yin (born 22 September 1992) is a Singaporean actress and video game streamer. She was the female lead in That Girl in Pinafore.

== Early life ==
Tan was born in Malaysia. She received her education in Singapore and studied Drama at the Nanyang Academy of Fine Arts.

== Career ==
In 2008, she debuted in the telemovie The Promise as a girl with intellectual disability. She was also the first runner-up in The New Paper's New Face.

In 2010, Tan starred in television episodes, including The Illusionist, No Limits and New Beginnings. She auditioned for Alpha Entertainment in 2011, and was given a chance to be part of K-pop girl group Skarf, which she turned down. She worked in television dramas A Tale of 2 Cities and A Song to Remember, as one of the female leads.

In 2013, she starred in movies Judgement Day and That Girl in Pinafore. She became the host for A Date with K-pop Stars, which debuted on 21 February 2014, where she travelled to South Korea and spent time with idols.

In 2013, Tan got her first individual lead role starring in 96°C Café. In the same year, she also starred in Gonna Make It. In 2015, Tan starred in The Dream Makers II as the main villain. It was her breakthrough role and she won her first acting award starring as Dong Zihuai in the drama. In May 2016, it was announced that Tan will take a 6-month break from acting in order to take a four-month acting course at New York Film Academy's school of acting.

== Personal life ==
Tan struggled with childhood trauma and self-harm when she was young, and had gone through treatment with her mother when she was between seven and twelve years old.

Tan revealed that she started her oocyte cryopreservation procedure in August 2023, after ending a 4-year relationship.

== Filmography ==
=== Television series ===
Year	Title	Role	Notes	Ref.
2020	Mister Flower (花花公子)	Zou Xiaoman		
2019	True Lies (大话精)	Nadia		
2018	Till We Meet Again (千年来说对不起)	Hua Caiyue		
2018	Till We Meet Again - Prequel (千年来说对不起-前传)	Xiao Hua Xianzi		
2017	The Lead	Fang Anya		
2016	My First School	Xu Leqing		
2016	Peace & Prosperity	Huang Zihong		
2015	The Dream Makers II	Dong Zihuai		
2015	The Journey: Our Homeland	Yao Jiahui		
2015	Tiger Mum	Chen Huixin		
2014	Three Wishes	Zhao Xiaomin		
2014	In The Name of Love	Bai Xiaoshan		
2013	Gonna Make It	Su Xiaoxiao		
2013	96°C Café	Tang Yuchen		
2013	It's a Wonderful Life	Hao Ping'an		
2012	Unriddle 2	Fu Lelin		
2011	A Song to Remember	Liu Jiumei		
2011	Let's Play Love	Isabelle		
2011	Secrets for Sale	Yumi	Cameo	
2011	A Tale of 2 Cities	Pan Lexuan		
2010	Secret Garden	Abby		
2010	No Limits	Liu Xinyu		
2010	New Beginnings	Luan Xiaofang		
2010	The Illusionist	Zhang Ting		

=== Film ===
Year	Title	Role	Notes	Ref.
2009	The Promise (向日葵的约定)	Lee Shanshan	Telemovie	
2013	Judgement Day	Xiaolu		
2013	That Girl in Pinafore	May Sun Xiaomei		
2017	Wonder Boy	Linda		

== Awards and nominations ==
Organisation	Year	Category	Nominated work	Result	Ref
Asian Television Awards	2016	Best Actress in a Supporting Role	The Dream Makers II	Nominated	
Star Awards	2013	Rocket Award	It's a Wonderful Life	Nominated	
Star Awards	2013	Top 10 Most Popular Female Artistes	—N/a	Nominated	
Star Awards	2014	Star Awards for Most Popular Regional Artiste (China)	—N/a	Nominated	
Star Awards	2014	Star Awards for Most Popular Regional Artiste (Indonesia)	—N/a	Nominated	
Star Awards	2014	Top 10 Most Popular Female Artistes	—N/a	Nominated	
Star Awards	2014	Favourite Onscreen Couple (with Xu Bin)	Gonna Make It	Nominated	
Star Awards	2014	London Choco Roll Happiness Award	In The Name Of Love	Nominated	
Star Awards	2015	Star Awards for Most Popular Regional Artiste (China)	—N/a	Nominated	
Star Awards	2015	Star Awards for Most Popular Regional Artiste (Indonesia)	—N/a	Nominated	
Star Awards	2015	Star Awards for Most Popular Regional Artiste (Malaysia)	—N/a	Nominated	
Star Awards	2015	Best Supporting Actress	Three Wishes	Nominated	
Star Awards	2015	Top 10 Most Popular Female Artistes	—N/a	Won	
Star Awards	2015	BottomSlim Sexiest Legs Award	—N/a	Won	
Star Awards	2016	Top 10 Most Popular Female Artistes	—N/a	Won	
Star Awards	2016	Bioskin Flawless Skin Award	—N/a	Nominated	
Star Awards	2016	Rocket Award	The Dream Makers II	Won	
Star Awards	2016	Best Supporting Actress	The Dream Makers II	Won	
Star Awards	2016	Favourite Onscreen Couple (with Zhang Zhenhuan)	The Dream Makers II	Nominated	
Star Awards	2017	Top 10 Most Popular Female Artistes	—N/a	Nominated	
Star Awards	2018	Top 10 Most Popular Female Artistes	—N/a	Nominated	
