= That Girl in Pinafore =

- Theatrical release poster
- 我的朋友, 我的同學, 我愛過的一切
- Directed by: Chai Yee Wei
- Produced by: Lai Wei Jie; Eugene Lee
- Starring: Daren Tan; Julie Tan; Hayley Woo; Jayley Woo; Seah Jiaqing; Kenny Khoo; Kelvin Mun; Xavier Ong
- Cinematography: Derrick Loo
- Edited by: Natalie Soh
- Music by: "The Narrow Stream Flows For A Long Time" by Liang Wenfu
- Production companies: Hot Cider Films; Mm2 Entertainment
- Distributed by: Golden Village Pictures
- Release date: August 1, 2013 (Singapore)
- Running time: 115 minutes
- Country: Singapore
- Language: Chinese
- Box office: 550,000 SGD

That Girl in Pinafore (Chinese: 我的朋友, 我的同學, 我愛過的一切; lit. 'My friend', 'my classmate', 'all that I've ever loved') is a 2013 Singaporean comedy-musical film directed by Chai Yee Wei and starring Daren Tan, Julie Tan, Hayley Woo, Jayley Woo, Kenny Khoo, Seah Jiaqing and Kelvin Mun.

== Plot ==
The story was set in the 1990s. Secondary school student, Jiaming (Daren Tan) was coping with both his O-level examinations and his parents' bar business, the Dream Boat. He and his mates Cao Gen (Seah Jiaqing), Hao Ban (Kenny Khoo) and Xiao Pang (Kelvin Mun) were studying. When a dare to get the numbers of two nearby girls, Jayley and Hayley Woo, went awry, the boys ran away. Jiaming bumped into the twins' friend, May (Julie Tan), while doing so, consequently dropping his Xinyao booklet.

After receiving their O-Level results, Jiaming decided to drop out of school, having already retained for two years, while the rest of the boys moved on. Coincidentally, they were placed in the same Junior College as the three girls they had met earlier. On the first day of school, the boys started a short-lived pornographic magazines business and were suspended from school for a month's time. Meanwhile, Jiaming visited the junior college to hang out with his friends and was attracted by a familiar music tune into an empty school assembly hall. There, he discovered May playing the song on the piano from the Xinyao book that he dropped earlier. He confronted her to repossess his book but was interrupted by three school bullies, whose leader said that May was his. Jiaming left the scene after a conflict with the bullies. Eventually, he met up with his three friends and learned about their suspension.

The boys became aware of Xinyao singing contest with a winner's purse of $5000. Jiaming suggested that they form a band and join the contest. After their auditions, the boys bumped into the girls, who had also tried their luck in the contest but lost because of technical difficulties. They decided to work together with the boys, forming a collaborative band. Subsequently, they were asked to perform at and advertise Dream Boat.

During a gig later on, Jiaming was hounded by a pack of bullies, headed by James (Xavier Ong), for his close relationship with May. They were eventually chased away and the performance goes on as per normal, until May unexpectedly collapsed because of a heart defect. May's mother banned her from seeing Jiaming after the incident but the warning was ignored and their relationship becomes stronger. They got romantically involved, as do the other guys and ladies. Xiao Pang receives Chinese tuition from his driver's daughter Liyana, and they become close. All is well until May announced that she was leaving for the United States.

May skipped school during her birthday and was joined by the boys. Upon realising her daughter's truancy, May's mother detained her in the house and confronts Jiaming, harshly warning him to stop seeing May. Jiaming and his friends had been repeatedly calling her, but her mother refused her to pick up the phone. On the night before leaving for the United States, May ran in the rain to flag a taxi to get to Jiaming's house. Jiaming spent the next few hours with her, and sent her off at the airport together with his friends, as her mother handed her her backpack. Before May entered the departure gate, she whispered to her mother that going to United States to study would be the last time that she would ever listen to her.

Jiaming visited May once in the United States with money pooled together by his friends, and after returning, he and his friends performed during the finals of the Xinyao competition. Months later, May died, and Jiaming, together with his friends, went to mourn her death. However, May's mother gave Jiaming a slap on his face, and drove them out.

18 years later, in the present day, Cao Gen sold cars while Hao Ban owned a kopitiam. Xiao Pang became a dentist and was blissfully married with Liyana and they have 2 sons. Jiaming went on to further his studies in English Literature and became a teacher. He also got married and named his first born, a girl, in memory of May. On the 18th death anniversary of May, Jiaming went to columbarium to offer flowers as his annual practices. There he met an American Chinese girl, Rachel Anderson (Naomi Yeo), who was born and stayed with her foster parents in United States. She identifies herself as May's daughter whom May gave birth to just before she died and she had come to Singapore to find out more about her mother.

Jiaming began to tear during their conversation, realising that Rachel was the surprise (Their fruit of love after he visited her in US) May promised him during an overseas call just months before she died and that May's mother forbids him to mourn at May's funeral probably because he gotten her pregnant out of wed-lock with May's insistence to carry on with the pregnancy despite the toil it could take on her weak heart. May's mother subsequently gave Rachel away to foster parent adoption in the US. After hearing from Rachel that she was living well with her foster parents, Jiaming decides not to identify himself as her biological father or May's boyfriend, so as not to disrupt her lifestyle.

Rachel invited Jiaming to her performance at a bar the next day, and Jiaming invited his old friends to watch her perform. On the day of the performance, Xiao Pang brought Liyana and his two sons along, and Rachel sang a rendition of "The Narrow Stream Flows For A Long Time".

== Cast ==
- Daren Tan as Jiaming, son of a guitarist and a singer at Dream Boat, with no interest in studies
- Julie Tan as May, Jiaming's love interest who was diagnosed with heart disease since birth
- Kenny Khoo as Hao Ban, Jiaming's friend, son of a noodle-stall owner
- Seah Jiaqing as Cao Gen, Jiaming's friend, son of a flower-shop owner
- Kelvin Mun as Xiao Pang, Jiaming's friend, son of a dentist
- Hayley Woo as Hayley, May's friend and Jayley's identical twin sister
- Jayley Woo as Jayley, May's friend and Hayley's identical twin sister
- Sherly Ng as Liyana, Xiao Pang's Malaysian family driver, Ezzam's daughter, Chinese tutor and later wife
- Xavier Ong as James, gang leader who liked May
- Michael Chua as Uncle Chew, May's potential stepfather who lived in the United States
- Naomi Yeo as Rachel, Jiaming and May's daughter who is fluent in English
- Steven Lim as a wannabe singer (cameo)

== Production ==
=== Filming and music ===
That Girl in Pinafore was directed by Chai Yee-wei, who had shooting such a film in mind for a long time. The film features, among others, "The Narrow Stream Flows For A Long Time" by Liang Wenfu.

== Release and reception ==
The film was released in Singapore on August 1, 2013. It was earlier showcased at the Shanghai International Film Festival in Shanghai, China, as a work-in-progress. Derek Elley of Film Business Asia labelled the film as "fairly routine", offering that the director and crew "squander a generally fine cast, and all its accumulated potential, by concentrating on the Jia Ming/May love story to the exclusion of almost everything else". However, he praised the film's "natural and likeable" singing performances. The film grossed an estimated S$550,000 during its run at Singaporean cinemas.

== See also ==
- Xinyao
- List of Singaporean films of 2013
