= Hayley Woo =

Singaporean actress (born 1991)

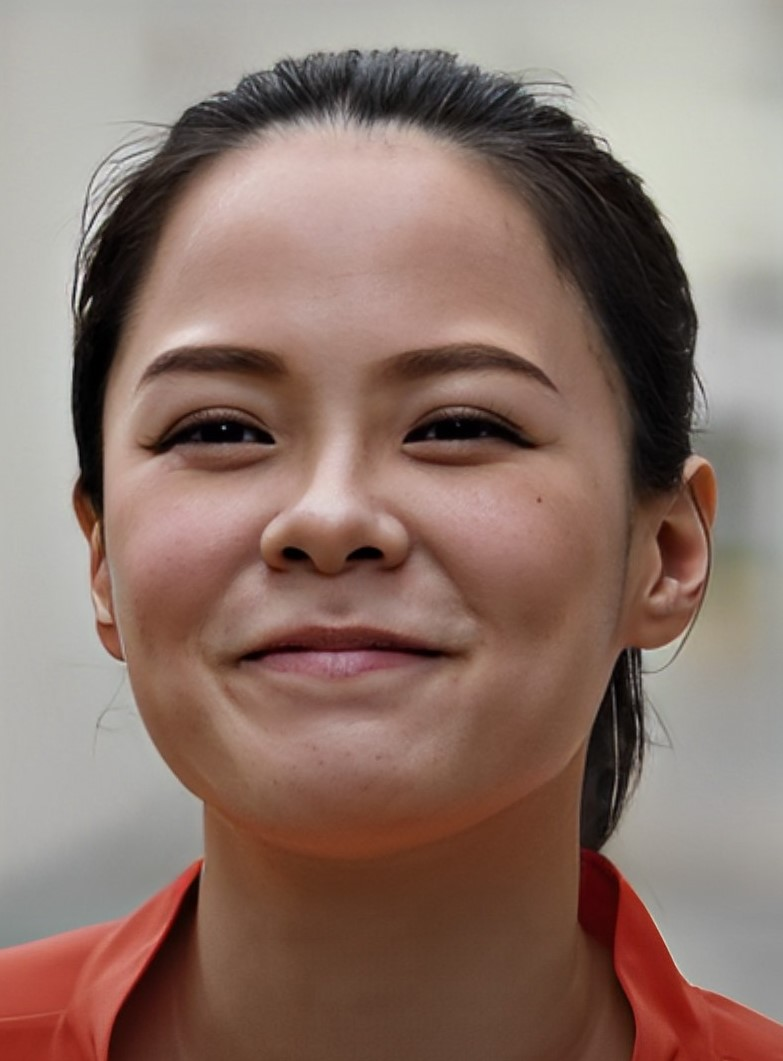
- Woo in 2018
- Education: ITE College West
- Occupation: Actress
- Years active: 2012–present
- Family: Jayley Woo (sister)

Chinese name
- Chinese: 胡佳嬑
- Hanyu Pinyin: Hú Jiāyì
- Yale Romanization: wùh gāai yi
- Jyutping: wu4 gaai1 yik4

Hayley Woo Jia Yi is a Singaporean actress and businesswoman. She was managed by JTeam JM Artiste Network from 2013 to 2017. She has an identical twin sister, Jayley Woo, who is also an actress and she is the elder of the twin.

== Career ==
Woo and her sister joined The New Paper New Face competition in 2011 and started their media career after it.

== Personal life ==
In 2014, Woo achieved a Guinness World Record with the most 360-degree horizontal spins in a wind tunnel in one minute as an individual with 26 horizontal spins.

Woo is in a relationship with fellow actor Richie Koh Woo confirmed she was dating Koh and called him a "romantic boyfriend" on the Valentine's Day on 14 February 2024.

== Filmography ==
=== Television series ===
Year	Title	Role	Notes	Ref.
2013	Dive Into Love (潜入蓝中篮)	Annie		
2013	The Recruit Diaries (阿兵新传)			
2014	Zero Calling	Madeline “Maddy” Wu		
2014	Three Wishes	Winnie Guo		
2015	118	Vivian		
2015	My Secret App	Lin Yangyan		
2015	Zero Calling 2	Madeline “Maddy” Wu		
2015	Crescendo	Carina Zhang Tongxuan		
2016	If Only I Could	He Xiaoqi		
2016	Fire Up	Zheng Xiangfei		
2017	118 II	Isabella Tang Yiyi		
2017	Life Less Ordinary	Liang Wenqing		
2018	Doppelganger	Chen Tianmei		
2022	Hungry Souls (味尽缘)	Meilan		

=== Film ===
Year	Title	Role	Notes	Ref.
2013	That Girl in Pinafore	Hayley		
2014	Filial Party	Yoona Zhuang Peishan		
2015	Ah Boys to Men 3: Frogmen	Amy		
2015	King of Mahjong	Cameo		
2015	Mr. Unbelievable	Omega		
2016	4 Love (爱在小红点)	Ella		
2016	The Moment (此情此刻)	Che Zai		

=== Variety show ===
Year	Title	Notes	Ref.
2015	Family Wanders (带你去吃风)	Host	
2016	My Oh My (大马玩全攻略)	Host	
2016	Take A Break (说走就走短假游)	Host	
2020	Ah Boys No Limits (超越极限)	Ah Girl	

=== Theatre ===
Year	Title	Role	Notes	Ref
2017	Chef: Bibimbap VS Chilli Crab	Cutie Chef	Role shared with Jayley Woo	

== Awards and nominations ==
Year	Ceremony	Category	Nominated work	Result
2018	Star Awards	Top 10 Most Popular Female Artistes	118 II (as Isabella Tang Yiyi)	Nominated
