= Eric Moo =

Malaysian singer-songwriter (born 1963)

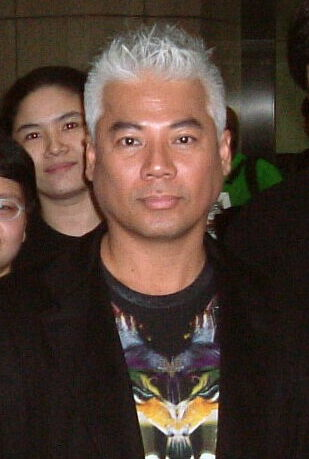
- Moo in 2009
- Born: Moo Chii Yuan; 9 February 1963 (age 63); Kampar, Perak, Federation of Malaya (present-day Malaysia)
- Occupations: Singer-songwriter; record producer; actor
- Years active: 1983–present
- Awards: Hong Kong Film Awards – Best New Performer; 1996 Those Were the Days...

Chinese name
- Traditional Chinese: 巫啟賢
- Simplified Chinese: 巫启贤
Transcriptions
Standard Mandarin
- Hanyu Pinyin: Wū Qǐxián
Yue: Cantonese
- Jyutping: Mou4 Kai2 Yin4
Southern Min
- Hokkien POJ: Bû Khé-hiân
- Musical career
- Also known as: Moo Kai Yin
- Genres: Rock, Mandopop, Cantopop
- Instruments: Vocals, guitar
- Label: EMI Sony Music (2009–present)

Eric Moo Chii Yuan (born 9 February 1963), also known as Wu Qixian, is a Malaysian singer-songwriter and record producer.

== Personal life ==
Moo was born in Mambang Diawan, Kampar, Perak on 9 February 1963. He moved to Singapore with his family when he was 8 years old. Moo is married to model Pang Meijun and they have two daughters. Moo's eldest daughter Yonghuan is attending Berklee College of Music.

== Career ==
Moo studied in Shuqun Primary School, The Chinese High School and Jurong Junior College in Singapore. He started his first band, "Subway Band" (地下铁), in high school and began performing on stage in 1983. A year later, he released his first album, which topped Singapore's record charts for Mandopop. Subsequently, he launched his singing career in the Taiwan. Since then, Moo has released more than 40 albums in Mandarin and Cantonese, and performed in over 40 concerts.

During the 1980s and 1990s, Moo was part of the xinyao movement and his peers included Lee Wei Song, Lee Shih Shiong, Billy Koh and Liang Wern Fook. One of his more memorable songs is "Kopi O" (咖啡乌), which he performed himself for the popular SBC 1985 drama series The Coffee Shop. At the Star Awards 2007 anniversary special, he revealed that he had insisted on using the term "Kopi O" in its original Hokkien rather than transliterating it into Mandarin according to the Speak Mandarin Campaign regulations.

In early 2006, Moo shifted his focus to the mainland Chinese market. He was a judge on four Chinese singing competition TV shows, Super Girl, Happy Girl, The King Returns and Voice Legend.

He held a controversial concert on 27 May 2012 at Suntec City. After having the understanding by the show's organisers that it was an evangelical concert, he sang only two of his own songs and decided to spread Christianity for the rest of his concert, sparking fury in many fans young and old who was not informed that it was an evangelical event. The concert organisers later offered refunds.

From July to August 2014, 12 of his classic hits were featured in the musical Innamorati, directed by Goh Boon Teck and written by Jiang Daini, sung by various Singapore Mandopop singers. Moo most recently performed at the xinyao-themed Tomorrow 32 series of concerts in August 2014, The Songs We Sang showcase in the same year and Eric Moo in Concert in November 2014, which was dedicated to xinyao.

== Discography ==
=== Mandarin albums ===
- 新马：心情 (1985)
- 新马：年輕的心 (1986)
- 新马：何必孤独（1987）
- 新马：唱不完的爱情（1987）
- 新马：城市情歌（1988）
- 新马：作品集（1988）
- 台湾：個性生活寫真集[你是我的唯一] (1988)
- 新马：奇迹（1989）
- 台湾：個性生活寫真集2[何必孤獨] (1989)
- 新马台：為了你[一個像我這樣的男子] (1989)
- 台湾：唱不完的情歌[巫啟賢的柔情之旅] (1990)
- 新马台：傷心情話[傷心的人更傷心] (1991)
- 新马台：赤子心情[是否你曾偷偷的哭] (1992)
- 新马台：我真的要走了[回到自己身邊] (1992)
- 新马台：紅塵來去一場夢 (1993)
- 新马台：这次不是流言（等你等到我心痛） (September 1993)
- 新马台：湊熱鬧 (1994)
- 新马港台: 太傻 Too silly (January 1994) EMI
- 新马台：愛情傀儡 Love Puppet (October 1994) EMI
- 新马台：愛那麼重 (August 1995)
- 新马台：思念誰 (January 1996)
- 新马台：我感覺不到你 (July 1996)
- 新马台：賢言賢語 (August 1997)
- 新马台：啟賢留文正 (March 1998)
- 新马台：我是你的（只愛一點點） (October 1998)
- 新马台：團圓（感動） (November 2000)
- 新马台：都是路彎彎 (March 2002)
- 新马台：好经典 (November 2009)

=== Cantonese albums ===
- 浪子心聲 (1989)
- 心酸的情歌 (23 June 1994)
- 有心[只因你傷心] (1995)
- 風中有你 (1996)
- 因為你 (1996)
- Denon Mastersonic - 巫啟賢 (1997)
- 日语单曲碟 (1998)

=== Compilations/Live albums ===
- 巫啟賢的傻情歌 (December 1996)
- 演唱會精選 (1997)
- 尋賢啟事 (December 1999)
