= Goh Boon Teck =

Singaporean playwright and director

Goh Boon Teck (Chinese: 吴文徳; pinyin: Wú Wéndé) is a Singaporean director, playwright and production designer.

== Early life and education ==
Goh's mother, Oon Ah Chiam, is a Chinese opera performer who performed with Chinese opera troupe, Sin Sai Hong. When Goh was young, he would follow Oon on stage as a performer, playing the roles of handmaiden or eunuch. Goh studied at Si Ling Primary School then Swiss Cottage Secondary School before majoring in Fine Arts at the Nanyang Academy of Fine Arts. He was the first Singaporean recipient of the VISA International Arts Scholarship in 1996 which allowed him to study Theatre Directing at Middlesex University, London, United Kingdom.

== Career ==
In 1990, Goh with 13 students, who had performed in Kuo Pao Kun's Lao Jiu, formed Toy Factory Theatre Ensemble, the predecessor of Toy Factory Productions. Goh would become its artistic director and it first produced a 20-minute play, The Bull Over The Rainbow, by Goh.

In 1994, Goh staged Titoudao, a play based on his mother's life story. Titoudao won five awards, Best Play, Best Original Script and Best Actress at the 2001 The Straits Times Life! Theatre Award, Program for Best Production Design/ Art Direction at New York Festivals TV & Film Awards 2021 and Best Newcomer at Asia Contents Awards 2021.

In 2001, Goh was awarded the Young Artist Award by the National Arts Council of Singapore. In 2007, Goh was appointed the creative director for the 2007 Singapore National Day Parade first held at The Float @ Marina Bay.

Goh is a firm believer in the preservation of Asian heritage, culture and history. His plays such as December Rains (2010), Titoudao (1994), Prism (2003) are a few of such representative works. Other creations such as Purple (2012), The Crab Flower Club (2012), Grind (2016) explore topics on gender and sexuality in contemporary Singapore, often prompting audiences to question morality and humanity.

In 2025, he received the Cultural Medallion for his contributions towards Singapore's art scene.

== International and local projects ==
In 2003, Goh was invited by Japan's Kageboushi Theatre Company to stage Prism as its writer and director. This project involved a 6-countries collaboration, touring Tokyo, Singapore, Bangkok, Manila, Kuala Lumpur and Jakarta. Goh's original show - The Crab Flower Club (2012) toured in Beijing, China in the East Pioneer Theatre during the China International Theatre Festival. His other work - K (2012) was showcased in Shanghai Modern Drama Valley in the International 5 Cities Public Theatre Festival, which he took on the roles of a Playwright, Director and Set Designer. Glass Anatomy (2014) staged in Shanghai Culture Square, Original Mandarin Music Festival was also the first foreign production invited to the festival and second original Singaporean musical presented in China.

== Works ==
Year	Title	Role(s)	Ref
1990	The Bull Over the Rainbow	Director	
1991	Redear	Director	
1992	Posteterne	Playwright, Director and Set Designer	
1993	Osean	Director	
1994	Titoudao	Playwright and Director	
1995	I Have A Date With Spring	Director	
1996	K	Playwright and Director	
1998	Purple	Playwright and Director	
1998	The Phoenix And The Turtle	Director	
1998	Mama Looking For Her Cat	Director	
1998	Storm	Director and Set Designer	
1999	Under	Director	
1999	Guys and Dolls	Director and Set Designer	
1999	A Midsummer Night's Dream by the Theatre Practice	Director	
1999	I Have A Date With Spring	Director	
2000	Titoudao	Director & Playwright	
2000	A Tinted Edge	Director & Playwright	
2000	Oleanna	Director & Set Designer	
2000	Gone With That Thing	Director	
2000	Mee Pok Man by Fiction Farm	Script adaptation playwright & Set Designer	
2001	Shopping & F***ing	Set Designer	
2001	The Eastern Line On My Palm	Director & Playwright	
2001	The Seventh Drawer	Director	
2002	Beautiful Thing (Mandarin)	Director	
2002	K	Playwright	
2002	The Morning People	Director & Set Designer	
2002	Fireface	Set Designer	
2002	Chessmaster	Director	
2003	Mad Phoenix	Director & Set Designer	
2003	Bent	Set Director	
2003	Beautiful Thing (Mandarin)	Director & Set Designer	
2003	Prism	Director & Playwright	
2004	East Side Story	Set Designer	
2004	Mergers and Accusations	Director	
2005	Thunderstorm	Director	
2005	Dangerous Liaisons	Set Director	
2005	Porcelain	Director	
2005	Spirits	Director & Set Designer in Shanghai	
2006	Long House	Playwright	
2006	Army Daze	Director & Set Designer	
2006	Cabaret	Set Designer	
2007	TiTouDao	Director & Playwright	
2009	Asia On The Edge (September)	Creative Director	
2009	Asia On The Edge (November)	Creative Director	
2010	Maha Moggallana	Director & Playwright	
2010	December Rains	Director	
2010	The Crab Flower Club	Playwright, Director & Set Designer	
2011	Equus	Set Designer	
2012	Tin Tan and his Tembusu Tree	Playwright & Director	
2012	K	Playwright & Director	
2012	The Crab Flower Club	Playwright, Director & Set Designer	
2012	Purple	Playwright	
2013	Glass Anatomy	Script Adaptation Playwright, Director & Set Designer	
2013	High Class Musical	Set Designer	
2013	The Penis Society	Playwright	
2014	Glass Anatomy	Director (in Shanghai Culture Square, Original Mandarin Music Festival)	
2014	Ah Boys to Men: The Musical	Script Adaptation Playwright	
2014	Innamorati	Director	
2015	Savage Land	Director & Set Designer	
2015	Titoudao	Director & Playwright	
2015	Upstage	Director	
2015	December Rains (Restage)	Director	
2016	Grind	Director & Playwright	
2016	Kumarajiva	Director	
2016	Innamorati Two	Director	
2017	Prism	Playwright	
2017	Songs of Guidance	Director	
2018	Songs of Liu San Jie	Director	
2018	Sometime Moon	Director & Playwright	
2018	A Dream Under The Southern Bough: The Beginning	Director	
2018	Masters of Comedy	Director	
2018	Oedipus	Director	
2019	The Severing Sword	Director	
2019	A Dream Under The Southern Bough: Reverie	Director	
2019	Infinite Island	Director	
2020	Titoudao (TV version by Mediacorp)	Creative Director & Original Playwright	
2020	7 Sages of The Bamboo Grove	Director & Co-Playwright	
2020	Old songs of Redhill Market (digital)	Director	
2020	Poetry under the Southern Bough	Creative Director	
2021	All The World Is One's Stage	Director	
2021	Masters of Comedy 2	Director	
2021	A Dream Under The Southern Bough - Existence	Director	
2021	Old Songs of Redhill Market	Director	
2022	Roar Talents	Director	
2022	Kwa Geok Choo - Singapore and the Story of Mrs Lee Kuan Yew	Director & Chief Artistic Director	
2023	Quest: The White Hare	Playwright & Director	
2023	Ignite The Sun	Director	

== Accolades ==
- Best Play of the Year (Titoudao) at 2001 The Straits Times Life! Theatre Award
- Best Original Script (Titoudao) at 2001 LIFE! Theatre Awards
- 2001 Young Artist Award by the National Arts Council
- Best Set Design (Fireface) at 2003 DBS LIFE! Theatre Awards 2003
- Arts and Culture Goh Boon Teck at 2005 Singapore Youth Award
- The Elite Director Award for Glass Anatomy at 5th One Theatre Prestige Award 2014 by Shanghai Modern Drama Valley
