= Liang Wern Fook =

- Born: April 1964; Singapore
- Origin: Singapore
- Genres: Xinyao, Mandopop
- Occupations: Writer, musician, singer, researcher
- Years active: 1980–present
- Label: Ocean Butterflies Music

Liang Wern Fook (Note: Chinese: 梁文福; pinyin: Liáng Wénfú) (born April 1964) is a Cantonese Singaporean writer, musician, singer and researcher in Chinese literature and pedagogy. He was one of the pioneer figures in xinyao (Singaporean Chinese folk songs) movement in the 1980s and 1990s.

== Early life and education ==
Liang grew up in a music-loving household, along with his two younger siblings. His father, a journalist, and his mother, an acupuncturist, were always playing the records of singers like Bai Guang and Zhou Xuan.

Liang received his primary and secondary school education at Catholic High School. He started taking piano lessons at the age of 10, and went on to attain a Grade 8 certificate. Liang wrote his first song, "Write A Song For You", at the age of 16, and he became more prolific once he started attending Hwa Chong Junior College (now Hwa Chong Institution), often performing with schoolmates in addition to heading the student council and Chinese society drama club. Many of the songs he wrote then, mainly about friendship and camaraderie, are still popular among the school's students today during gatherings, where different singing groups would often perform together.

Liang later attended the National University of Singapore, where he was the top student for both his major, Chinese studies, and in the Arts faculty in 1988. He graduated with a Bachelor of Arts with Honours in Chinese Literature in 1989 and a Master of Arts in 1992 from the National University of Singapore. In 1999, he received his Ph.D. in Chinese Studies from the Nanyang Technological University.

== Career ==
=== Musical career ===
As a singer-songwriter, Liang's first song "Sing a Song for Hwa Chong" (唱一首华初的歌) was written in 1981 after he lost in an inter-school debating competition at Hwa Chong Junior College. His first commercial song, "A Song for You" (写一首歌给你) was released in 1984 on the Ocean Butterflies (海蝶音乐) label. During his xinyao phase from 1986 to 1992, he released five albums, some of which sold as many as 20,000 copies. Among these, Door (门) was the first Singaporean Mandarin album to be completely composed and written by the same artiste. The song "One Step at a Time" (一步一步来) sat for six weeks at the top of the charts in 1987, while "Love's Refuge" (恋之憩) was at the top for 29 weeks in 1986, an unbroken record for a local pop song.

Liang's particularly iconic composition is the song "Negotiations And Love" (情商). He penned this in the aftermath of the 1989 Tiananmen Square protests and massacre, and Taiwanese singer Wen Zhang recorded it. The song became popular in Singapore, Taiwan and mainland China.

He has composed television serial theme songs for the then Singapore Broadcasting Corporation, now MediaCorp. Since the 1990s, Liang has also written hits for Cantonese and Mandarin pop stars such as Jacky Cheung, Andy Lau, Leon Lai, Tony Leung, Alex To, Eric Moo, Kit Chan, Joi Chua and Stefanie Sun. In 1996, he wrote and composed the songs for Singapore's first Chinese musical December Rains. In the following year, Liang wrote the theme song "Are You Still There" (你是不是还在) for Singapore film Track (轨道). In August and September 2007, Liang's songs were featured in a local Chinese musical If There're Seasons by The Theatre Practice.

In 2004, Liang wrote "Watch The Sunrise With Me" (陪我看日出) for Joi Chua.

In April 2015, Liang held his 1st solo concert For Music, For Life... Liang Wenfu Concert 2015 at The Star Theatre. He also created the theme song for Mediacorp's drama series Life- Fear Not.

In 2016, Liang released his first album in 24 years, I Hear The Sound of Dawn (我听到天开始亮了). It contains 15 tracks and features Singaporean singers such as Stefanie Sun, Joi Chua, Tay Kewei, Alfred Sim and younger performers ShiGGa Shay and Tosh Zhang.

Liang is still involved in the music business through writing one to six songs a year. He would offer his work to the singer whom he thinks is most suitable for the tune. To date, Liang has over 200 musical compositions and songs to his name.

=== Literary career ===
Liang is also a poet, essayist and a former columnist for Lianhe Zaobao. He has over ten publications in various genres of creative writing. His works, such as the essay collection, The Last Years of Kreta Ayer (最后的牛车水, 1998), which is also used as a GCE A Level text in Singapore; poetry collection In Fact I am in Love with Time (其实我是在和时光恋爱, 1989); and short story collection The 21 Dreams of Liang Wern Fook (梁文福的21个梦, 1992) showed a new direction for Singapore Chinese literature. These books recorded the changes in modes of feeling and expression brought about by the peer pressure and complexity of life in a post-modern society.

=== Academic career ===
Liang went into academia in 1990. Liang is an adjunct associate professor at NTU's Division of Chinese. He also lectures at the National University of Singapore and the National Institute of Education.

=== Business career ===
Liang runs a Chinese language enrichment centre for primary and secondary school students, set up in 1997, with his wife.

== Personal life ==
In 1992, Liang married Liu Xiu Mei, a former Chinese language teacher of The Chinese High School, whom he met in university.

== Honours ==
In 1988, Liang received gold medal awards from both the National University of Singapore's Arts and Social Sciences Faculty and the Nanyang Technological University's Chinese Studies Department.

In 1990, Liang was voted "Most Popular Writer" by local students in a poll organised by Lianhe Zaobao. In 1992, he received the National Arts Council's first Young Artist Award. He won the Singapore Book Prize in 1996. In a 2003 poll conducted by the Composers and Authors Society of Singapore (Compass), Liang was voted "Person Who Best Represents the Xinyao Spirit". The same poll placed seven of his songs among "the ten greatest xinyao songs", with "Friendship Forever" (细水长流) in top position.

In music, Liang's achievements include: Sing Music Highest Honour Award (1988), Xinyao Festival Best Lyrics and Music Award (1989), Singapore Hits Highest Honour Award (1994), Singapore Hits Best Local Lyrics Award (1995; 2001; 2003; 2005) and the Meritorious Award from Compass (1999), and Best Original TV Series Theme Song at the Asian Television Awards (2002), Outstanding Achievement Award(Music) at the Singapore Entertainment Awards(2010), Best TV Drama Theme Song Award at the Star Awards(2010).

In 2008, Liang was awarded the Alumni Achievement Award by NTU (of which the NIE is a part of).

In 2010, Liang was awarded the Singapore Cultural Medallion.

In 2012, Liang was honoured as "Special Artist of the Year" when Chingay Parade celebrated its 40th anniversary.

== See also ==
- Literature of Singapore
- Music of Singapore
