= Heartache =

Heartache may refer to:

- Lovesickness, a condition involving romantic obsession or longing
- A broken heart or heartbreak, emotions after loss, disappointment or relationship break-up

== Music ==
=== Albums ===
- Heart Ache, a 2004 EP by Jesu
- Heartache (Erykah Badu album)
- Heartache (Kit Chan album)
- Heartaches (Patsy Cline album), a 1985 compilation album
- Heartaches (Dexter Gordon album)

=== Songs ===
- "Heartache" (song), a 1987 single by Pepsi & Shirlie
- "Heartache", a song by Converge from No Heroes
- "Heartache", a song by Norma Jean from Deathrattle Sing for Me
- "Heartache", a song by ONE OK ROCK from 35xxxv
- "Heartache", a song by Relient K from Air for Free
- "Heartache", a song by Rock Goddess from Rock Goddess
- "Heartache", a song by Stephanie Mills from Something Real
- "Heartache", a track from the soundtrack of the 2015 video game Undertale by Toby Fox
- "Heartaches" (song), a 1931 song by Al Hoffman and John Clenner
- "It's a Heartache", 1972 song by Bonnie Tyler, sometimes referred to as simply "Heartache"

== Other media ==
- Heartaches (1916 film), an American silent film
- Heartaches (1947 film), an American crime film
- Heartaches (1981 film), 1981 movie with Margot Kidder

== See also ==
- Heartbreak (disambiguation)
- Heart attack (disambiguation)
- Heartburn, a burning sensation often caused due to gastric acid in the esophagus
- Herzeleid, an album by Rammstein
