= Eelyn Kok =

Singaporean actress (born 1978)

- Born: 12 August 1978 (age 47); Singapore
- Other name: Guo Huiwen
- Education: Bukit Panjang Government High School; National Junior College
- Alma mater: National University of Singapore
- Occupation: Actress
- Years active: 2001–present
- Children: 1

Chinese name
- Traditional Chinese: 郭蕙雯
- Simplified Chinese: 郭蕙雯
- Hanyu Pinyin: Guō Huìwén
- Hokkien POJ: Kok Hūi-bûn

Eelyn Kok Hui Wen (born 12 August 1978) is a Singaporean actress. She was a full-time Mediacorp artiste from 2001 to 2013.

== Career ==
Kok was first spotted in SPH MediaWorks's talent show Route to Glamour in 2001 and was a contestant alongside Jeanette Aw and Adam Chen. Although she did not win, she was offered a contract with MediaWorks and later joined MediaCorp in 2005 when the two companies merged.

Kok started her acting career playing supporting roles in her starting years, frequently portraying villainous characters such as in The Little Nyonya. She was nominated for the Best Supporting Actress category in 2009 but lost to winners Xiang Yun and Ng Hui.

In August 2009, Kok starred in My Buddy as the first female lead, alongside established actors Christopher Lee and Aileen Tan. In the same year, she played Huang Jinhao in the Channel 8 blockbuster drama, Together. The role of Jinhao was originally intended for Fiona Xie but it went to Eelyn when Fiona was unable to take the role for personal reasons. Kok's performance in Together saw her popularity rise and earned her a Best Actress nomination in Star Awards 2010.

Kok appeared in two dramas in 2010, Precious Babes and The Family Court. She also starred in the 2011 year-end anniversary series A Song To Remember opposite Joanne Peh and Qi Yuwu.

== Personal life ==
Kok studied at Bukit Panjang Government High School and National Junior College, and graduated from the National University of Singapore where she majored in Economics and Japanese.

Kok also has experience as a part-time model, which she earned during her school days.

Kok is a Christian. She has been a guest speaker at Hope Church Singapore, and at All Saint's English.

Kok married Goh, a former IT professional in the auditing industry, on 10 October 2010. She gave birth to a son, Zane, on 1 April 2013.

Kok has been candid about her bout of depression when she was 23 and just starting out her acting career. Her symptoms included seclusion, laying in one place for prolonged periods, crying, and not showering for weeks. She has further stated that she also experienced lethargy, melancholy, had difficulty sleeping, and became antisocial, locking herself in her room for up to six months. Upon doing research online, she realised her condition and sought professional help. She said the close timing of a failed first relationship with her mother's battle with advanced stage cervical cancer was ultimately the trigger. Her mother died of cancer in 2003.

== Filmography ==
=== Television series ===
Year	Title	Role	Ref
2001	Wonderful Life – Pass It Forward (奇妙人生之感冒男女)		
2003	Crunch Time II (转捩点II)		
2002	Cash is King		
2002	Tonight I Will Tell (人生导火线I之无良神琨)		
2004	Perfect Woman (完美女人)		
2004	Zero	Fu Mingzhu	
2004	Project J (水母计划)		
2004	Perceptions	Geri Lee	
2005	A Promise for Tomorrow		
2005	A New Life	Qiurong	
2005	Love Concierge (爱的掌门人)	Irene Chua	
2005	Baby Blues		
2006	The Shining Star	Xuling	
2006	Rhapsody in Blue	Zhao Cuiping	
2006	Women of Times	Wu Yabin	
2007	Man of the House	Tan Yimin	
2007	Kinship Part 2	Zhao Shuiling	
2007	Kinship Part 1	Zhao Shuiling	
2007	The Peak	Lin Shuanghui	
2008	The Little Nyonya	Huang Zhenzhu	
2008	Love Blossoms II	Yu Meiwei	
2008	Love Blossoms	Yu Meiwei	
2008	Beach.Ball.Babes	Mavis	
2009	Together	Huang Jinhao	
2009	My Buddy	Ruyi	
2009	My School Daze	Lin Yuxuan	
2009	The Dream Catchers	Li Shanshan	
2009	First Class	Yvonne Chew	
2010	The Family Court	Zhao Ning	
2010	Precious Babes	Cui Zhiqing	
2011	A Song To Remember	Song Qiao'er	
2011	The Seeds of Life	Su Xiaoyu	
2011	On the Fringe 2011	Ivy	
2012	The Day It Rained on Our Parade	Qiu Yanping	
2012	Yours Fatefully	Song Yiyi	
2014	Yes We Can!	He Yunzhi	
2015	The Dream Makers II	Xu Meiling	
2015	Life - Fear Not	Jane Seah	
2015	Second Chance (流氓律师)	Liu Feifei	
2015	Let It Go (分手快乐)	Mabel	
2015	My Secret App	Ming Sao	
2016	118 II	Shen Jiahui	
2016	Soul Reaper (勾魂使者)	Alice	
2016	Fire Up	Ivy	
2016	Don't Worry, Be Healthy	Cai Shumei	
2017	My Friends from Afar	Xu Xinmei	
2017	Have A Little Faith	Zhou Jiayi	
2017	Patisserie Fighting	Paige	
2018	Say Cheese	Elsie	
2018	Babies on Board	Ann	
2018	Reach for the Skies	Annie	
2018	Doppelganger	Shuntian's Mother	
2018	Star Crossed	Pan May Shu	
2019	After the Stars	Elaine	
2019	Day Break (空渐渐亮)	Fang Chulin	
2019	Last Madame	Madam Lam	
2019	C.L.I.F. 5	Ruby	
2019	From Beijing to Moscow	Lin Meiling	
2019	Dear Neighbours (我的左邻右里)	Alvery	
2019	Hello From The Other Side - Its Time (阴错阳差 — 时辰到)	Wen Qi	
2019	Walk With Me (谢谢你出现在我的行程里)	Janet Wan Siling	
2021	The Peculiar Pawnbroker (人心鉴定师)	Belinda Goh	
2021	The Heartland Hero	Vivian	
2021	Key Witness (关键证人)	Tang Bee Siew	
2021	My Mini-Me & Me (很久以后的未来)	Zhang Zhendong's mother	
2021	Crouching Tiger Hidden Ghost	Emily Tan	
2021	Soul Old yet So Young (心里住着老灵魂)	Ivy	
2021	Mind Jumper (触心罪探)	Pan Ailing	
2022	Love at First Bite (遇见你真香)	Sandra	
2022	Soul Detective (灵探)	Chen Airu	
2022	Healing Heroes (医生不是神)	Fang Ruoxin	
2022	You Can Be An Angel 4 (你也可以是天使 4)	Kimberly Lim	
2022	Truths About Us (别来无恙)	Guo Linlin	
2023	Silent Walls	Rebecca	
2023	Mr Zhou's Ghost Stories@Job Haunting II	Ms. Ko	
2023	Cash on Delivery	Fang	
2023	The Sky is Still Blue	Song Lifen	

== Awards and nominations ==
Year	Ceremony	Category	Nominated work	Result
2007	Star Awards	Best Supporting Actress	Kinship (as Zhao Shuiling)	Nominated
2007	Star Awards	Favourite Screen Sweetheart	—N/a	Nominated
2009	Star Awards	Best Supporting Actress	The Little Nyonya (as Huang Zhenzhu)	Nominated
2010	Star Awards	Best Actress	Together (as Huang Jinhao)	Nominated
2011	Star Awards	Top 10 Most Popular Female Artistes	—N/a	Nominated
