= NTU Music Express =

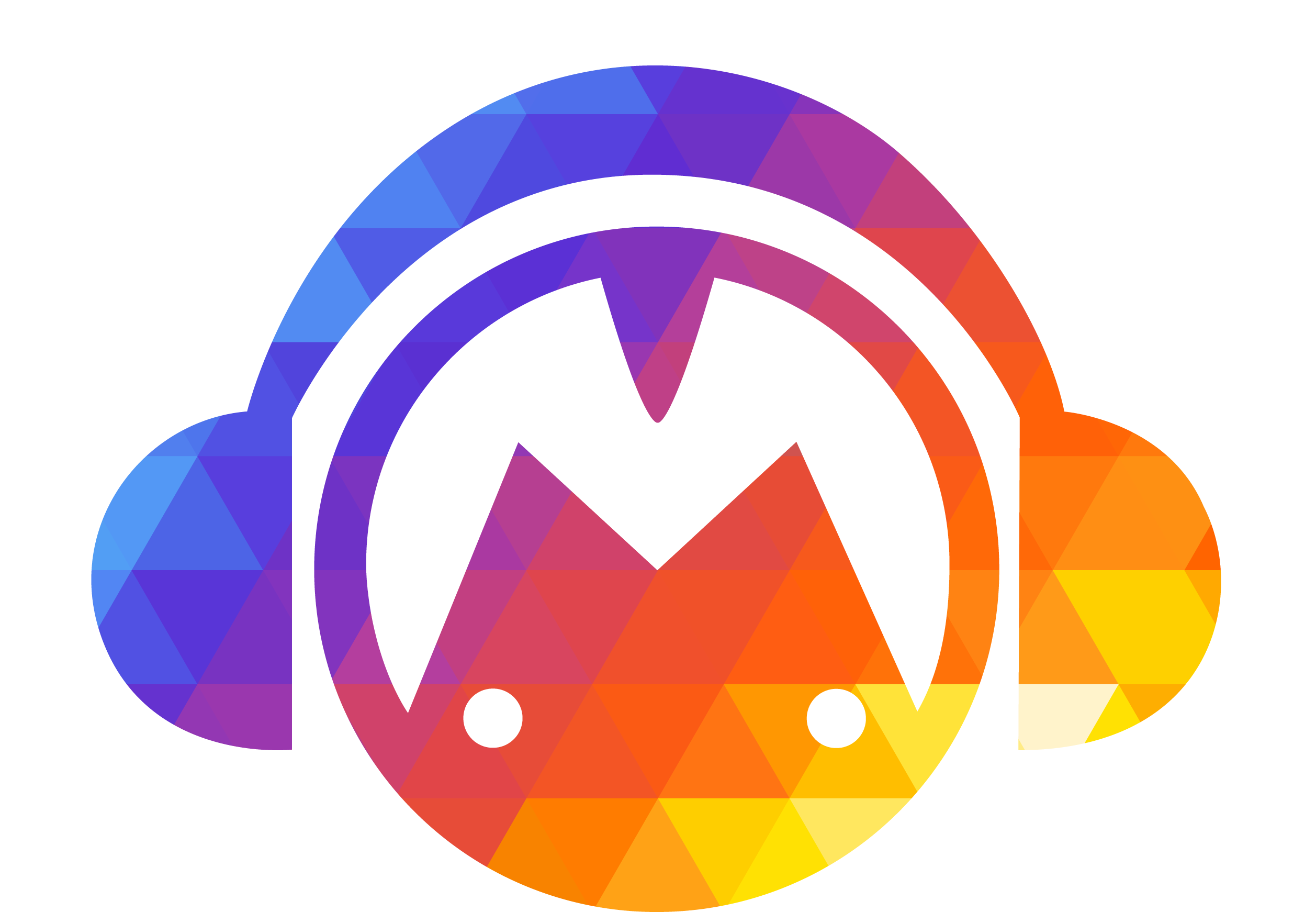
NTU Music Express Logo

NTU Music Express is an annual non-profit Chinese Song Composing Competition organized by Nanyang Technological University (NTU) Chinese Society. Up till now, it has been held for twenty-two years consecutively.

In the past few years, "Music Express" has explored and stimulated the creative potential of many students, and become a platform for NTU students to show their talent. The aim of "Music Express" is to encourage people to participate in the Chinese song writing and express their feelings, views and thoughts.

"Music Express" was originally a non-competitive activity; the majority of participants are NTU students. Now, the competition is opened to any students, residents and citizens in Singapore and Malaysia who are below 35 years old and students above 12. Original songs will be given some comments by professional judges. Eight groups of finalists will be invited to participate in roadshow and workshop section.

== History ==
Previously, Music Express competitions were mainly focusing on Singapore tertiary institution students.

From the 12th to 18th, “Music Express” was divided into two groups which are group A, songwriting (contestants must compose the rhythm and lyric), and group B, lyric writing (contestants must fill in the lyric in the song provided by the organizer). Even though Group B is eliminated in the 19th Music Express, it was divided into Student Group and Public Group. However, Student Group was eliminated in the 20th Music Express. Despite this, Music Express has held its own event roadshows to the public outside NTU in 21st and 22nd Music Express. At the same time, the competition was promoted to Malaysia.

In the "Music Express" of previous years, Singapore's famous songwriters such as Ms Naomi, Mr. Wang Rui Qi, Ms. Xing Zeng Hua, Mr. Liu Guo Ming, Mr. Xu Huan Liang, Mr. Goh Kheng Long, Mr. Eric Ng, Mr Derrick Tham, Ms. Xiaohan, Mr Hong Junyang, Mr. Jim Lim and Mr. Zhang Si Er were invited to be the guest of honor and judges of "Music Express". In addition, famous singers for instance Serene Kong, Ah Du, Zhang Feng Qi, Wu Jia Hui, Joi Chua, Kelvin Tan Wei Lian, Huang Yida, Soda Green and Ling Kai were invited as special guests as well. Singapore singers, Kelly Poon and Stella Seah, were also few of the performing guests who had performed in Music Express.

=== Previous Music Express-22nd Music Express ===
The twenty two Music Express was held successfully in August 2016. The nationwide Chinese Song Composing competition focused on Singapore tertiary institution students, in return numerous good entries were collected. Singapore renowned music recording companies, Touch Music Publishing Pte Ltd and Ocean Butterfly Music Pte Ltd are Music Express's official working partners.

== Timeline ==
=== 20th Music Express ===
Period	Event
24 August 2014	Grand Finale Performance

=== 22nd Music Express ===
Period	Event
20 Dec 2015 to 22 May 2016	Original song submission period
24 March 2016	Music Sharing Session
25 June 2016	Workshop
17 July 2016	Roadshow
20 August 2016	Grand Finale Performance

=== 23rd Music Express ===
Period	Event
12 Dec 2016 to 22 May 2017	Original song submission period
29 March 2017	Music Sharing Session
17 June 2017	Workshop
8 July 2017	Roadshow
26 August 2017	Grand Finale Performance

== Prizes ==
=== 20th Music Express ===
Award	Prizes	Entries	Lyricist	Composer
First Prize	Cash $1200 + Trophy + Certificate	《深夜》	Ong Sanchez	Isaac Yong (Zheng Yu)
First Runner-up	Cash $600 + Trophy + Certificate	《个人Siesta》	Tiffany Kwa, Eddy Sng, Tammy Jeongin, Hanrey Low	Chong Yun Xiang
Second Runner-up	Cash $300 + Trophy + Certificate			
Best Performance Award	Trophy + Certificate			
People's Choice Award	Trophy + Certificate			

=== 21st Music Express ===
Award	Prizes	Entries	Lyricist	Composer
First Prize	Cash $1200 + Trophy + Certificate + Acoustic Guitar	《认输》	Boon Hui Lu	Cheong Waii Hoong
First Runner-up	Cash $500 + Trophy + Certificate + Acoustic Guitar	《转角的微笑》	Wan Li Ying	Guo Wei Qi
Second Runner-up	Cash $300 + Trophy + Certificate + Acoustic Guitar	《傻瓜》	Liu Zhi Huang	Yu Qing Jun
Best Lyrics Award	Cash $150 + Trophy + Certificate	《认输》	Boon Hui Lu	Cheong Waii Hoong
Best Composer Award	Cash $150 + Trophy + Certificate	《转角的微笑》	Wan Li Ying	Guo Wei Qi
People's Choice Award	Cash $100 + Trophy + Certificate	《傻瓜》	Liu Zhi Huang	Yu Qing Jun

=== 22nd Music Express ===
Award	Prizes	Entries	Lyricist	Composer
First Prize	Cash $1200 + Trophy + Certificate + Acoustic Guitar	《时间逆转》	Clover Ng	Grace Teo
First Runner-up	Cash $500 + Trophy + Certificate + Acoustic Guitar	《城市》	Chai Siew Li	Chai Siew Li
Second Runner-up	Cash $300 + Trophy + Certificate + Acoustic Guitar	《不说话了》	Goh Chun Wei	Goh Chun Wei
Best Lyrics Award	Cash $150 + Trophy + Certificate	《时间逆转》	Clover Ng	Grace Teo
Best Composer Award	Cash $150 + Trophy + Certificate	《脱离》	Tee Yao Sheng	Tee Yao Sheng
People's Choice Award	Cash $100 + Trophy + Certificate	《脱离》	Tee Yao Sheng	Tee Yao Sheng

=== 23rd Music Express ===
Award	Prizes
First Prize	Cash $1000 + Trophy + Certificate + Acoustic Guitar
First Runner-up	Cash $500 + Trophy + Certificate + Acoustic Guitar
Second Runner-up	Cash $350 + Trophy + Certificate + Acoustic Guitar
Best Lyrics Award	Cash $250 + Trophy + Certificate
Best Composer Award	Cash $250 + Trophy + Certificate
People's Choice Award	Cash $150 + Trophy + Certificate

== Past finalists and guest performers ==
Event	Finalists	Guest performer
21st Music Express	Steve Soh & Rex Vun; Cheong Waii Hoong; Boon Hui Lu; Zhang Yi Qing; Yu Qing Jun & Liu Zhi Huang; Liu Song Yu; Guo Wei Qi & Wan Li Ying; Wang Jia Yi & Tan Hui Zhen	Serene Koh
22nd Music Express	Chai Siew Li; Tee Yao Sheng; Sally Yiew; Clover Ng & Grace Teo; Goh Chun Wei; Chai Pei Shan; Hannah Pang	Ling Kai
