= My Buddy (TV series) =

Singapore Chinese television drama

- 难兄烂弟
- Genre: Family; Air Conditioning Company
- Written by: Zhao Zhijian (赵志坚）
- Directed by: Lin Mingzhe (林明哲） Wu Yulin (邬毓琳）
- Starring: Christopher Lee; Zheng Geping; Eelyn Kok; Carole Lin; Aileen Tan; Ng Hui
- Opening theme: 总会有一天 by Milubing
- Country of origin: Singapore
- Original language: Chinese
- No. of episodes: 20

Production
- Producer: Wu Yulin (邬毓琳）
- Running time: approx. 45 minutes per episode

Original release
- Network: MediaCorp Channel 8
- Release: 8 July – 4 August 2009

Related
- A New Life; Love Blossoms; Love Blossoms II; The Little Nyonya; My School Daze

My Buddy (Chinese: 难兄烂弟) is a Singaporean Chinese drama which was broadcast on MediaCorp Channel 8 every weekday night at 9pm. It made its debut on 8 July 2009 and ended on 4 August 2009. It consists of 20 episodes and was produced by Matrix Vision Productions.

== Plot ==
Zeng You Quan (Paul Chan), aged 40, is a single and an honest man and works in an air con company as a technician and supervisor. His mother died early and his irresponsible father suddenly went missing. Being the eldest in the family, You Quan had to take care of his two sisters.

His younger sister, Zhi Ling, is already 35 and still single. Zhi Ling is unsociable and stingy, thus You Quan is worried that she will remain single. Hence, he is always trying to matchmake Zhi Ling but is always unsuccessful. Unknown to him, Zhi Ling is actually secretly in love with a guy.

The youngest sister, Zhi Mei, aged 26 is a university graduate. In order to let her pursue her studies in University, You Quan took loans from banks. However, after graduating, Zhi Mei does not take her job seriously and is always changing jobs. Obsessed with her material needs, she often asks You Quan for money.

You Quan have a buddy, so-called ‘Brother’, Chen Ying Bang (Pounds) aged 39. They grew up together in the kampong. When You Quan’s mother was seriously ill, Ying Bang accompanied him to search for his father and got hit on the head by You Quan’s father. You Quan feels guilty over this incident. Since then, whenever Ying Bang gets into trouble, You Quan will go all the way out to help him.

Although Ying Bang is married, he still womanizes and is not down to earth. He is always thinking of earning easy money and will resort to all means. His sister, Chen Mei Jin (US Dollars) aged 33 is ugly but has a kind and pure heart. She runs a stall in the market selling bras with her sister-in-law. Mei Jin likes You Quan since young and will always try to get close to him.

However, You Quan only treats Mei Jin as a sister and though he is not able to endure her entanglements, he cannot bear to reject her. You Quan though has someone in mind, Li Ru Yi, aged 35, the daughter of his boss and CEO of his owned air con company named Li Ji Xiang. 8 years ago, when Ru Yi got married, You Quan was heartbroken and got drunk. When he woke up and found Mei Jin in bed besides him, he feels extremely guilty. It is this guilt that drives You Quan to always help Ying Bang and Mei Jin.

One day, You Quan receives a call from his sister asking him to rush home immediately as an unknown woman appeared at their house. You Quan find out later that this woman is their stepmother, Ye Pei Yi, aged 38. Upon receiving news that their father died, the children felt no sadness as for so many years, he had not been with them.

Pei Yi showed them their father’s will. Their father had willed half his share of his flat to Pei Yi. They immediately rejected her intruding into their house. Despite their rejection, she demanded for half of the money for the house since they do not want her to live in the house. In the end, they let her stay on as they could not fork out the huge sum at that point of time. From then on, You Quan has to put up with the 3 women in the house.

Mei Jin thought that Pei Yi is You Quan’s woman thus resulting in a lot of misunderstanding. She even had a fight with Pei Yi at the market. After the misunderstanding has been cleared up, she suddenly changes her attitude towards Pei Yi and they become best friends. When Mei Jin knows that Pei Yi is preparing to go back to sing at the 7th month getai, she heartily arranged You Quan’s boss, Lee Ji Xiang to meet Pei Yi. Surprisingly, Ji Xiang has a liking for Pei Yi and tries to get close to her.

You Quan’s dream lover, Ru Yi divorced and returns to Singapore with her 6 years old daughter. Although You Quan is happy to see Ru Yi, he still feels inferior and dare not reveals his feelings for her. Meanwhile, You Quan finds out that Zhi Ling is secretly in love with Ying Bang for many years. When Ying Bang’s wife finds out about it, she goes into shock and suffers a miscarriage.

After Zhi Ling’s secret is out, she feels ashamed and her personality changes from a little darling to a rebellious one. She turns to an old man enough to become her father for love. You Quan introduces Ying Bang to work in his company. However, Ying Bang is not a conscientious worker and even commits corporate espionage. When discovered, he makes You Quan a scapegoat and caused You Quan to be fired by Ru Yi. When Mei Jing learns the truth, she tells Ru Yi. She immediately fires Ying Bang and asks You Quan to go back to her company but is turned down by him. You Quan decided to start a business with Ying Bang. They become successful after much hardship.

When You Quan realises Ru Yi’s company is facing a crisis, he lends a helping hand. Can You Quan win over Ru Yi’s heart? Will Ying Bang turns over a new leaf?

== Cast ==
=== Main cast ===
Cast	Character
Christopher Lee 李铭顺	Zeng You Quan / Paul Chan (40 years old)
Zheng Geping 郑各评	Chen Ying Bang / Pounds (39 years old)
Eelyn Kok 郭惠雯	Li Ru Yi (35 years old)
Carole Lin 林晓佩	Chen Mei Jin / US Dollars (33 years old)

=== Supporting cast ===
Cast	Character
Aileen Tan 陈丽贞	Ye Pei Yi / Stepmother (38 years old)
Koh Yah Hwee 许雅慧	Zeng Zhi Mei (26 years old)
Ng Hui 黄慧	Lin Sheng Lian
Zhu Houren 朱厚任	Li Ji Xiang
Adele Wong 王惠姗	Zeng Zhi Ling (35 years old)
