= Forbidden City: Portrait of an Empress =

Forbidden City: Portrait of an Empress is a Singapore musical that tells the story of Empress Dowager Cixi of the Qing dynasty of China. It was staged by the Singapore Repertory Theatre originally on 17–19 October 2002 at the Esplanade - Theatres on the Bay, as part of its opening festival, and back again in 2003 by popular demand and in 2006 as part of the IMF meetings in Singapore. Forbidden City was developed by Stephen Clark, Dick Lee and Steven Dexter. It was staged once again in August 2017 at the Esplanade - Theatres on the Bay.

== Cast ==
Character	2002	2003	2006	2017
Kuang Hsu			Dwayne Tan	Dwayne Tan
Kuang Hsu ( nine years old)			Dillon Ong; Ng Kit Chong; Russell Marino Soh	
Kuang Hsu ( 15 years old)			Luke Kwek	
Prince Tun			George Chan	Benjamin Chow
Prince Tuan			RJ Rosales	
George Morrison			Hal Fowler	Earl Carpenter
Kate Carl			Leigh McDonald	Steffanie Leigh
Yehanara / Empress Dowager	Emma Yong; Kit Chan	Kit Chan	Celine Rosa Tan; Kit Chan; Sheila Francisco	Cheryl Tan; Kit Chan; Sheila Francisco
Emperor			Oliver Pang	
Curator			Cynthia Lee MacQuarrie	
Record Keeper (1)			Hossan Leong	
Record Keeper (2)			Sebastian Tan	
Tung Chih ( four years old)			Joel Ng; Jovan Lee; Presslee Chng	
Tung Chih			Kaylen Chan	
Grand Eunuch			Richard Chia	

== Synopsis ==
=== Act One ===
Kate Carl, an American artist, is invited to paint the portrait of the Empress of China, Cixi. When she arrives in China she hears many rumours about the Empress. She also meets George Morrison, an English journalist on the train to Beijing. He tells her not to be intimidated by the rumours that they heard from the locals. After meeting the Empress, she is asked by the Empress when the work on the portrait can begin. Kate tells her that she must know her before painting the portrait, as art is a two way process. The empress is suspicious of her, but begins her story which unfolds back fifty years ago when she was a young girl.

The empress, known then as Yehenara, yearns to become the Emperor's escort after the then empress becomes pregnant. As is the custom, the Emperor starts to look for a new escort. Yehenara is chosen, and after three months she is pregnant and the emperor is choosing yet another escort. Yehernara is taken to the Summer Palace, which is said to be the best place to give birth to a child. There, she gives birth to a son, Tung Chih. He is the Emperor's first son and thus very important to the dynasty. However, as is the custom, the baby is taken away from Yehenara to be brought up by the court.

Prince Tun, the emperor's scheming brother, is devastated by the birth of Tung Chih as he has plans to take the throne for himself. However, whilst still at the Summer Palace, the British attack and destroy the Palace. The Royal party flee to the Winter Palace. By then, the Emperor is very weak and is dying. Yehenara knows that if he dies without naming Tung Chih as his heir, Prince Tun could claim the throne and her and her son's life would be in grave danger. Although attempts are made to prevent her from finding her son, Yehenara finds her son and rushes to the Emperor's chamber. With his last breath, the Emperor names Tung Chih as his successor and Yehenara as regent.

=== Act Two ===
A few years later, Tung Chih grows up to be a rebellious young man. He is tempted by Prince Tuan, the son of Prince Tun, to go to the brothels. Indulging in his new-found freedom, he becomes ill with syphilis. Yehenara is helpless to do anything but wipe his feverish brow with her handkerchief as he dies. Again, Prince Tun sees a chance for power, but is thwarted when Yehenara quickly names her nephew, Kuang Hsu, as the next Emperor.

Meanwhile, Kate writes to Morrison about these events. He is amazed that the Empress is being so open and notes that the stories the Empress has told Kate contradict all the rumours he has heard. He wonders how he is going to write a book on the Empress.

Meanwhile, the Empress continues her story. She tells Kate that Kuang Hsu became an ambitious Emperor, determined to reform China. But this leads to the Boxer Rebellion and China is crippled by the internal conflict. Despite everything Yehenara has tried to do, she is surrounded by loss and failure.

Kate meets with Morrison. She is falling in love with him, while Morrison continues to be fascinated by everything she tells him about the Empress. The day arrives when Kate is to show the Empress the completed portrait, but the Empress is furious at a newspaper article which claims she is evil and that she killed Tung Chih with a smallpox laden handkerchief. She thinks that Kate has betrayed her, but Kate finds out that Morrison betrayed her instead, with the aim to get a bigger market for opium in China, as the opium war didn't do the trick.

After learning the truth, Kate is devastated, as she had fallen in love in Morrison. Kate returns to the museum, where she unveils her portrait. After seeing the portrait, the museum visitors continue thinking of Empress Cixi as a dragon lady. Although Kate tries to tell her story, nobody wants to listen. The musical ends with both Yehernara and the Empress looking at the portrait and telling her that their real story has been told.

== Songs ==
- Dragon Lady
- Why The Forbidden City
- Starting With The Eyes
- My Only Chance
- I Need Him, Falling In Love
- Summer Palace
- Now China Has A Son
- The Land of Our Fathers
- Gentle Touch
- Blood in the Streets
- Why Dream of Love (New song added in 2003)
- Stories
- My Only Chance (Reprise)
- Why Dream Of Love (Reprise)
- Stories (Reprise)

== Differences between the three runs ==
Some scenes were being altered or deleted as the musical was being extended so as to attract more people to watch it.

- In the original run (2002), Prince Tuan is shot dead but in 2003 and 2006, Prince Tun is the one being shot.
- In 2002, Prince Tun tells the empress to allow him to lead a battle, else the allied troops launch an attack after dusk. But in 2003 and 2006, it was Yehernara as there is another song to be sung by her, Why Dream of Love, which was added in 2003.
- In 2002, it did not show the stages where Kuang Hsu were growing up, but in 2003 and 2006, there is a scene where Kuang Hsu was reading a book when he was a little boy, before becoming a teenager and finally, an adult.

== Critical response ==
Discussing the 2017 reproduction, Candy Choo of felt that "the 15-year-old production is spectacular" but "the repetitive songs cause the play to drag, leaving viewers less than satisfied."
