= My School Daze =

- 书包太重
- Genre: Education; Badminton; Violin; Culinary Arts
- Starring: Chen Hanwei; Ann Kok; Rui En; Terence Cao
- Opening theme: 书包太重 by Daren Tan
- Ending theme: 给别人多一点时间 by 杨佳盈
- Country of origin: Singapore
- Original language: Chinese
- No. of episodes: 20

Production
- Producer: Soh Bee Lian
- Running time: approx. 45 minutes per episode

Original release
- Network: Mediacorp Channel 8
- Release: 29 April – 26 May 2009

Related
- Table of Glory (2009); No Limits (2010)

My School Daze (Chinese: 书包太重) is a Singaporean Chinese drama which was telecasted on Singapore's free-to-air channel, Mediacorp Channel 8. It made its debut on 29 April 2009 and ended on 26 May 2009. This drama serial consists of 20 episodes, and was screened on every weekday night at 9p.m. It reflects the education system in Singapore.

== Plot ==
Tan Xiangchun is a traditional, Chinese-educated senior teacher who deeply feels unappreciated at work because of his poor command of the English language. The younger generation no longer sees the importance of their mother tongue and moral education. As such, they despise and disrespect him. Gradually, Xiangchun becomes disillusioned with education and upon facing some health issues, dejectedly leaves the teaching line.

Xiangchun's wife, Kang Qiaozhen, used to compile textbooks with the Ministry of Education. She left her high-paying job for more flexibility in juggling her children and career, and sets up a tuition centre in the heartlands, hoping to carve out a great career in the education business. Not wanting to be a loafer, Xiangchun joins her tuition centre.

Xiangchun's younger brother, Tan Xiangfeng, is free-spirited and uninhibited by nature. A trend-setter, he is a freelance Radio DJ, model and because of his travel articles, is a celebrity of sorts. Their father died young and Xiangchun had been shouldering the responsibility of caring for Xiangfeng. As a doting elder brother, he even attends match-making sessions with his wife in tow, in the hope of finding Xiangfeng a suitable other-half. Because of this, Xiangfeng becomes involved with sassy teacher Zhang Luoyun and the two later become an item.

Luoyun belongs to the new generation of teachers who is skilful at using innovative methods (like bringing students for a ride in her sports car, giving them CDs of their idols, etc.) to bring her students close to her. Wildly popular with her students, she manages education like a career, with lofty ambitions of scaling the career ladder. Overly eager for success, she spoke harshly to her student, Ma Jialing, because the latter's grades were below expectations, a move which hurt Jialing's pride, thus many students started feeling uncomfortable with her. She had always been confident of being promoted to head-of-department, and upon not getting selected for promotion, she leaves teaching in disappointment.

Through Xiangfeng, Luoyun joins Qiaozhen's tuition centre. To raise the standards of the centre, Luoyun suggests the starting of elitist classes, much to Xiangchun's objection as it contravenes his philosophy that education should be non-discriminatory. The difference in ideologies causes Luoyun to leave the centre, and she brings Xiangfeng along with her. Together with Yuxuan (her friend who had just graduated and returned from abroad) and Xiangfeng, she starts a premium tuition centre that accepts only outstanding students.

Tuition centres proliferate with parents’ over-anxiousness for their children to get ahead in life through academic excellence. Regardless of their children's needs, "kiasu" parents usually jam-pack their schedules with courses and classes. Qiaozhen's neighbour, Tang Andi, is a typical example. Due to his wife Tao Guijuan's wish to groom their son for success, the two become a money-grubbing couple who think of all means to raise money for their son Dehua's tuition fees. Andi, a hawker, even piggy-backs his wife for a medical drug test, causing much hilarity. A quarter through the events of the story, Andi and Guijian take 13-year-old student Jiang Jun in as a boarder of sorts, the latter having come from China with his 'peidu (study) mother'.

Dehua, affectionately nicknamed Fatty Bon Bon, is an average student, but has a flair for cooking. He is "force-fed" with tuition so much so that he feigns spirit-possession, then runs away from home. Fatty Bon Bon's talent gets discovered by a celebrity chef, who gives his parents a talking-to. Enlightened, Andi and Guijuan finally come to terms that their son is not academically inclined, and no longer subtract the possibility of letting him pursue his career in the food & beverage industry.

A dedicated and hands-on parent, Qiaozhen never suspects anything amiss with her teaching methods. Her daughter, Tan Yixin, is a star pupil who excels in studies, badminton and music. Unfortunately, she loses out to Jiang Jun, who joins her class mid-term. Unable to face her own failure, Yixin completely loses it, much to her parents’ shock. It is only then that Xiangchun and Qiaozhen realise that their daughter has high IQ, but near-to-no EQ. Their son, Yijie, lies to wriggle out of tuition classes because of his passion for badminton. Upon deliberation and co-ordination, the couple finally instil correct values in their children and acknowledging Yijie's aptitude in sports, lists the Sports Academy as one of the choices for the latter's secondary education.

Luoyun's preoccupation with elitist education causes a rift in her relationship with Xiangfeng. Troubled, she gets to know that Jialing is suffering from depression because of her poor studies (for which her mother pressures her) and parents’ divorce. Luoyun wholeheartedly helps Jialing. In the process, she comes to identify with Xiangchun's belief that education should be non-discriminatory and subscribing to it, gives up upon her tuition centre's elitist education, returning to becoming a down-to-earth teacher with MOE again.

== Cast ==
Cast	Character
Chen Hanwei 陈汉玮	Tan Xiang Chun 谭向春
Ann Kok 郭舒贤	Kang Qiao Zhen 康巧珍
Cynthia Koh 许美珍	Tao Gui Juan 姚贵娟
Rui En 瑞恩	Zhang Luo Yun 张洛芸
Terence Cao 曹国辉	Tan Xiang Feng 谭向风
Darren Lim 林明伦	Tang Andi 唐安迪

=== Supporting cast ===
Cast	Character
Chen Tianwen 陈天文	Ma Guo Liang 马国良
Lin Meijiao 林梅娇	Huang Li Qin 黄丽琴
Eelyn Kok 郭惠雯	Lin Yu Xuan 林羽萱
Apple Hong 洪乙心	Tracy
Boon Hui Lu 文慧如	Ma Jialing 马嘉玲
Jarren Ho Jin Yang 何俊扬	Rain 'Fatty Bon Bon' Tang Dehua 唐德华
Fang Rong 符芳榕	Tan Yixin 谭艺欣
Zong Zijie 宗子杰	Jiang Jun 江军
Steven Liuyu 刘宇	Tan Yijie 谭艺杰

== Reception ==
Average viewership for each episode is 986,000.

=== Accolades ===
Organisation	Year	Award	Nominee(s)	Result	Ref.
Star Awards	2010	Best Screenplay 最佳剧本	Chen Sew Koon 陈秀群; Seah Choon Guan 谢俊源	Nominated	
Star Awards	2010	Young Talent Award	Jarren Ho 何俊扬	Nominated	
Star Awards	2010	Young Talent Award	Boon Hui Lu	Nominated	
Star Awards	2010	Favourite Female Character	Rui En	Nominated	
Star Awards	2010	Best Supporting Actor	Darren Lim	Nominated	
