= Boon Hui Lu =

Singaporean singer-songwriter and actress

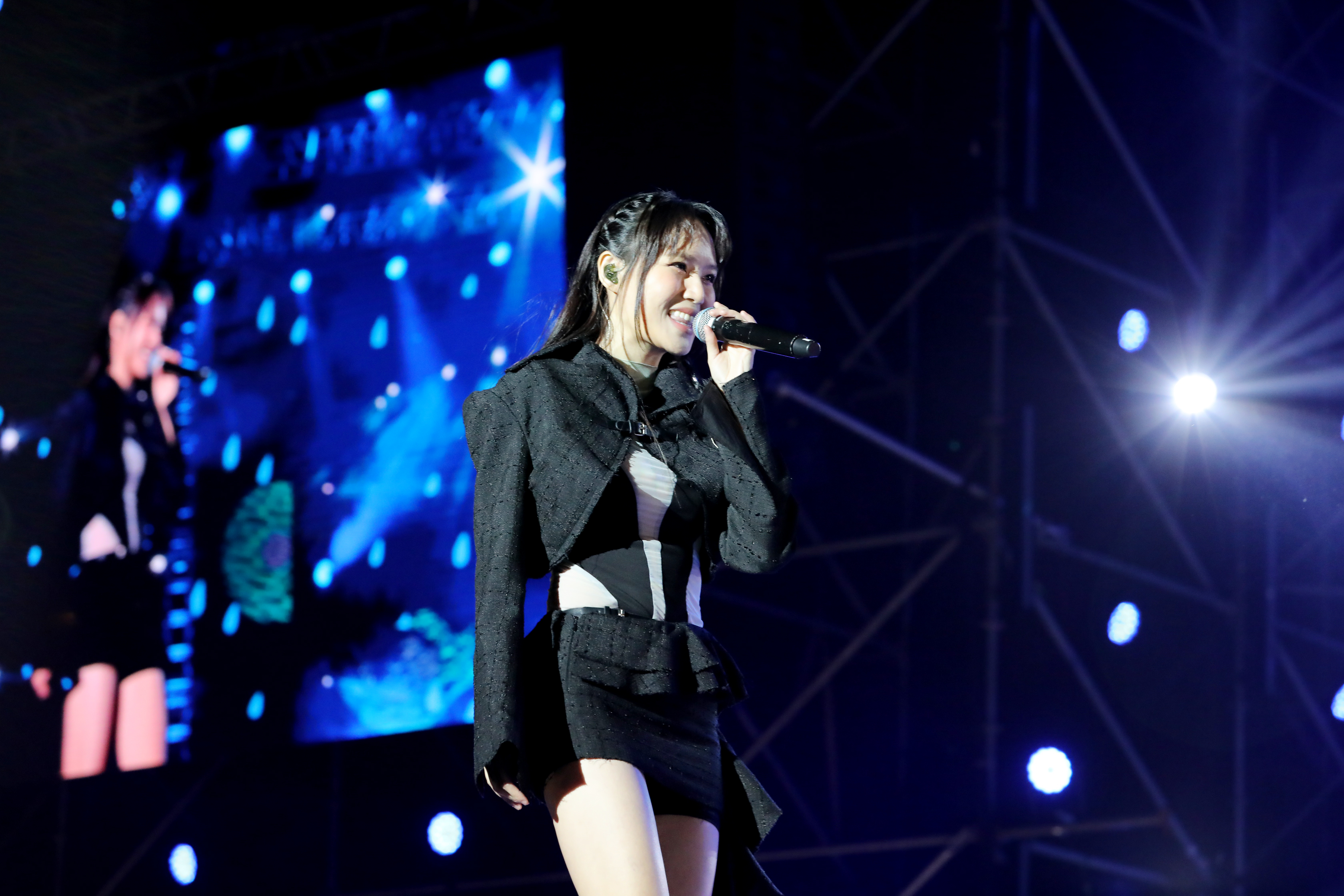
- Born: Boon Hui Lu; 11 December 1993 (age 32); Singapore
- Other names: Boonie; Wen Huiru; Boon Boon
- Education: Anglican High School; Victoria Junior College
- Alma mater: Nanyang Technological University
- Occupations: Singer-songwriter; actress
- Musical career
- Origin: Singapore; Taiwan
- Genre: Mandopop
- Instruments: Vocals; guitar; keyboard
- Years active: 2006–present
- Labels: HIM International Music; Sony Music Entertainment; Epic Records; Mediacorp
- Spouse: Cheong Waii Hoong (m. 2023)

Chinese name
- Traditional Chinese: 文慧如
- Simplified Chinese: 文慧如
- Hanyu Pinyin: Wén Huìrú

Boon Hui Lu (born 11 December 1993) is a Singaporean singer-songwriter and actress.

== Early life and education ==
Boon was born on December 11, 1993, in Singapore。

Boon studied at Anglican High School. While studying at the Victoria Junior College, Boon had joined the school choir as she knew "she wanted to sing professionally". In 2015, she graduated from Nanyang Technological University's Nanyang Business School with an Accountancy degree. She was offered a job at a big accounting firm but had turned it down to pursue her music dreams.

== Career ==
Boon started her career as a child actress. She won the Star Awards for Young Talent for her role in the television drama Rhapsody in Blue in 2006.

In 2012, she represented Singapore in the popular Taiwanese reality TV singing competition Million Star. She also participated in the Channel 5 reality TV singing competition The Final 1 (2013) and was among the top 40 finalists.

Since she started writing songs in 2014, she has won awards at songwriting competitions such as National Environment Agency's Eco Music Challenge and the national talent competition Impresario. In June 2016, she took part in the Workplace Safety and Health Council's songwriting competition and was picked as one of the three finalist with her song titled Safety. Your Word, Your Life.

In 2016, her compositions Every day is a Miracle and Your Body Speaks were featured on Taiwanese singer Hebe Tien's album, Day by Day. In April 2016, she signed on with Taiwanese record label HIM International Music.

She starred in the Crescendo The Musical, which was performed at the Kallang Theatre, in December 2016. In 2017, Boon participated in 'Taiwan Hopestar' talent show. Boon released her first album on 4 January 2019, Honestly Me (親愛的你__怎樣的我; Qīn'ài de nǐ _ _ zěnyàng de wǒ).

In 2019, Boon was the guest star in Namewee's Song Never Give Up (不想放開; Bùxiǎng fàng kāi), which she also covered complete. and performed live in Singapore. Boon also won the Media's Recommended Female Songwriter of the Year award at the 2019 Global Chinese Golden Chart Awards.

In 2024, Boon did not renew her contract with HIM International Music and left the agency to be her own agent.

== Personal life ==
In 2020, Boon suffered from Steatocystoma multiplex.

In August 2021, Boon announced her engagement to music producer Cheong Waii Hoong, with whom she has been in an ongoing relationship since February 2021. The couple held their wedding ceremony on 7 October 2023.

== Filmography ==
=== Television series ===
| Year | Title | Role | Notes | Ref. |
|---|---|---|---|---|
| 2006 | Rhapsody in Blue | Doudou | | |
| 2009 | My School Daze | Ma Jialing | | |
| 2012 | Joys of Life | | | |
| 2014 | Served H.O.T | | | |
| 2015 | Crescendo | Tang Huiru | | |
| 2016 | Don't Worry, Be Healthy | Mavis Wu | | |
| 2016 | My First School | Teacher Kate | | |
| 2023 | Till the End | Lin Huiqi | | |
| 2023 | Venus on Mars | Zhu Weiwei | | |

=== Film ===
| Year | Title | Role | Notes | Ref. |
|---|---|---|---|---|
| 2003 | Homerun | Seow Fang's Schoolmate | Bit part | |

== Discography ==
=== Studio albums ===
| Album information | Track listing | Ref |
|---|---|---|
| Honestly Me (親愛的你__怎樣的我): Studio Album; Released: 4 January 2019; Label: HIM International Music | Track listing: 1. Honestly Me (怎样的我); 2. I Wonder Why (愛情十萬個為什麼); 3. Better When It's Worse (有害); 4. Tears (只有眼淚); 5. About Your Guitar (你的吉他); 6. The Superwoman League (女超人聯盟) (feat. Janice Yan); 7. The Scientists (大人的科学); 8. Between Dust and Dreams (夕阳); 9. Wrong but Right (错对了); 10. Dear, (亲爱的你) | |
| Reset: Studio Album; Released: 24 June 2022; Label: HIM International Music | Track listing: 1. Reset (还原); 2. Crush on You; 3. Losing Myself (全放空) (feat. GBOYSWAG); 4. Game of Love (玩意); 5. Messed Up (feat. Qiu Feng Ze); 6. I'm Lost; 7. Better Left Unsaid (不可言说); 8. By Your Side (同行); 9. Don't Be Afraid (feat. 黃祝賢儒); 10. Be Your Sunshine (做你的太阳) | |
| Project EP - 回到那天: Extended Play; Released: 18 January 2025; Label: Independent | Track listing: 1. Echoes of Yesterday (回到那天); 2. HER GUIDE TO LOVE (女孩戀愛手冊); 3. Everytime It Hurts; 4. Love In The Abandoned Galaxy (我的愛在遺落的銀河) | |

=== Soundtrack contributions ===
| Year | Song title | Series title | Ref |
|---|---|---|---|
| 2018 | Give me (给我一个) | Mind Matters | |
| 2018 | Hang Around (走走) | Jalan Jalan (带你去走走) | |
| 2020 | Good to Have You (有你就足夠) | Dr. Cutie (萌医甜妻) | |
| 2020 | By Your Side (同行) | Loving You (爱没有距离) | |
| 2020 | Not Anymore (不讓你再) | The Wonder Woman (跟鯊魚接吻) | |
| 2020 | Show A Little More Care (feat. Nicole 赖淞凤) (多一点关心) | Social Playlist (声音猎人) | |
| 2023 | Till the End (陪你到最后) | Till the End (陪到最后) | |
| 2024 | Wait with Me (想等到你) | KIDS (小子) | |
| 2024 | oink (你是猪) | The Accidental Influencer (何百芮的地獄毒白) | |
| 2024 | PSYCH! (海龜湯) | Urban Horror (都市懼集) | |

=== Singles ===
| Year | Title | Ref |
|---|---|---|
| 2017 | My Present Is Not A Dream (我的現在不是夢) | |
| 2017 | Unaccomplished (一事無成) | |
| 2019 | Story of my grandma (外婆的大海) | |
| 2020 | Losing Myself (feat. GBOYSWAG) (全放空) | |
| 2024 | Call Me Baby (feat. Nine Chen) (可是他叫我寶A) | |
| 2024 | Glowing Prevage® Girl (feat. 鱼闪闪BLING & Feng Timo) (橘灿女孩) | |

== Theatre ==
| Year | Title | Role | Ref |
|---|---|---|---|
| 2016 | Crescendo The Musical (起飞) | Deng Xueli | |

== Concert ==
=== Ticketed concert ===
| Date | Location | City | Country | Concert name |
|---|---|---|---|---|
| 22 July 2018 | Syntrend Clapper Studio | Taipei | Taiwan | Boon Boom Live Concert |
| 15 Jan 2022 | Capitol Theatre | - | Singapore | Sing, My Love |
| 14 Feb 2025 | Esplanade Annex Studio | - | Singapore | Hey Dear, Time to Go Back Again with Me |

== Awards and nominations ==
=== Star Awards ===
The Star Awards are presented by Mediacorp.

| Award | Category | Nominated work | Result | Ref |
|---|---|---|---|---|
| Star Awards 2006 | Young Talent Award | Rhapsody in Blue (as Doudou) | Won | |
| Star Awards 2010 | Young Talent Award | My School Daze (as Ma Jialing) | Nominated | |
| Star Awards 2019 | Best Theme Song | Mind Matters 《给我一个》 | Nominated | |
| Star Awards 2021 | Best Theme Song | Loving You 《同行》 | Nominated | |
| Star Awards 2024 | Best Theme Song | Till The End 《陪到最后》 | Nominated | |
| Star Awards 2024 | Favourite CP | Till The End (with Richie Koh) | Nominated | |
| Star Awards 2024 | Top 10 Most Popular Female Artistes | —N/a | Nominated | |
