= Kit Chan =

Singaporean singer (born 1972)

- 陈洁仪
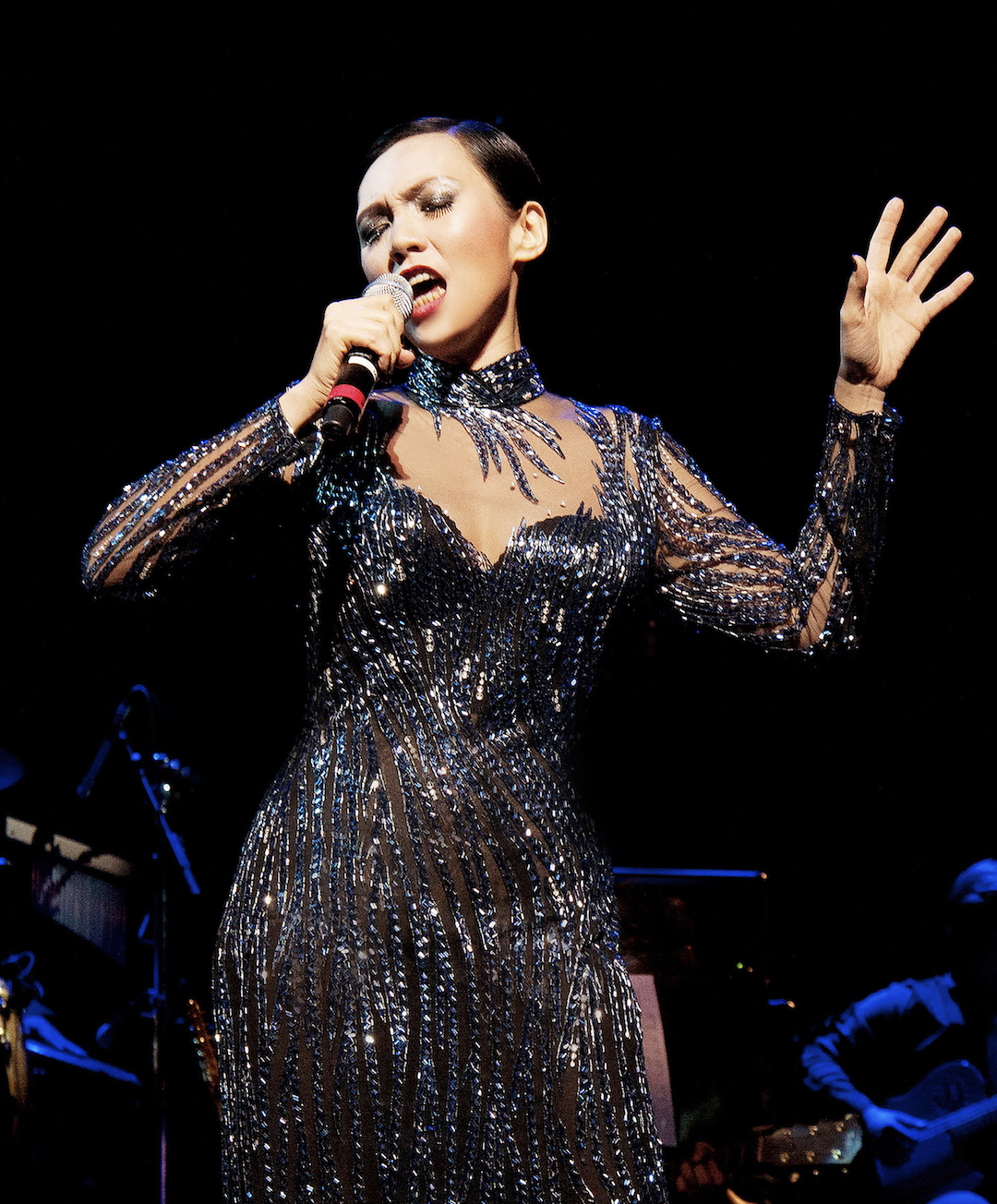
- Chan in concert in 2011
- Born: 15 September 1972 (age 54); Singapore
- Other name: Chen Jieyi
- Education: Raffles Girls' School; Raffles Junior College; Lasalle-SIA College of the Arts
- Occupations: Singer; actress; businesswoman; former public relations executive
- Years active: 1993–present
- Height: 1.64 m (5 ft 5 in)
- Awards: Star Awards 2000 : Best Theme Song; Star Awards 2012 : Best Theme Song; Star Awards 2016 : Best Theme Song; Star Awards 2026 : Best Theme Song
- Musical career
- Genres: Pop; Mandopop; Cantopop
- Labels: Ocean Butterflies (1993–2004); Banshee Empire (2010–Present); Taihe Music Group (2015–Present)

Chinese name
- Traditional Chinese: 陳潔儀
- Simplified Chinese: 陈洁仪
- Hanyu Pinyin: Chén Jiéyí
- Bopomofo: ㄔㄣˊ ㄐㄧㄝˊ ㄧˊ
- Jyutping: can4 git3 ji4
- Website: kitchan.com

Chan Kit Yee (Chinese: 陈洁仪; Jyutping: Can^{4} Git^{3} Ji^{4}; born 15 September 1972), known professionally as Kit Chan, is a Singaporean singer and actress.

== Early life and education ==
Born on 15 September 1972 in Singapore, Chan is the third daughter in a family of four sisters.

Chan studied in Fairfield Methodist School, Raffles Girls' School, Raffles Junior College and Lasalle-SIA College of the Arts. During Chan's six-year hiatus from the music scene from 2004 to 2010, she returned to LaSalle as a mature student. She wrote a thesis on the psychology of performance and graduated with first-class honors.

== Career ==
When Chan was 17, she sang during a songwriting competition and was spotted by music producer Billy Koh of Ocean Butterflies. She then became a studio singer singing jingles and cover versions.

In 1993, Chan launched her debut album Do Not Destroy The Harmony in Singapore. In 1994, Chan released the album Heartache, which contains six tracks from Do Not Destroy The Harmony for the Taiwanese market. She subsequently released more albums regionally including Liking You (喜欢你), Dazzling (炫耀), and Worried (担心), performing in parts of Asia, the United States, Korea, and New Zealand, as well as collaborating with symphonies and orchestras in Hong Kong, Taiwan and Singapore.

Chan performed a song, Home, during the 1998 Singapore National Day Parade which became very popular in Singapore. It was subsequently performed in various editions of the National Day Parades.

In 2000, Chan published a collection of her English poems, Cork out of my Head, in Taiwan, re-titled I Write a Page in Singapore, and in 2006 a fiction book (together with her friend, Siew Fern Yong) titled Cathy and Jodie: The Princess and the Flea.

Kit Chan's "That's Kit" concert poster

In June 2001, Chan staged her debut Singapore concert, presented by DBS Bank, at the Singapore Indoor Stadium.

Chan took a hiatus in 2004 from her performing career to further her studies and joined international PR consultancy Hill & Knowlton as a campaign specialist in 2007. She worked on the Ministry of Defence's 2009 Total Defence campaign, 'What Will You Defend?'. She left the company after 19 months.

Chan has also worked across languages, with her Cantopop and English albums, and theatrically. She has held lead roles in the Hong Kong musical Snow.Wolf.Lake with Jacky Cheung – both the Cantonese version in 1997 and the Mandarin production in 2005 – followed by The Legend (where she played the late Teresa Teng), and Forbidden City: Portrait of An Empress (where she played the young Empress Dowager Cixi) – first performed in 2002 as part of the Esplanade's opening programme, and again in 2003. Chan has also played the lead in the Dutch-Hong Kong production of East Meets West, and the Taiwanese musical What's Love Got to Do with It?.

In September 2006, Chan reprised her role in Forbidden City: Portrait of an Empress, as part of a plan to make this musical internationally recognized, in the hope of going on a world tour. Chan later fronted the first Singapore Day in New York City in 2007. After her corporate sojourn, Chan performed the commissioned theme song One World at the APEC 2009 Gala Night and returned the theatre as leading lady (Li Qing) in the Mandarin musical December Rains at Esplanade Theatre in 2010. In the same year, she sang Home for the third time at the National Day Parade. Chan was also a member of the cast of the television drama Healing Hands II, the sequel to TVB's medical drama Healing Hands in 2000. She was the female lead in SPH MediaWorks Channel U's drama serial Cash is King. Chan also acted in the 2010 film Lover's Discourse.

In 2011, Chan released her first studio album Re-interpreting Kit Chan (重譯 陳潔儀) since 2004 and staged two solo concerts in collaboration with the Singapore Chinese Orchestra at Esplanade Concert Hall, as the anchor performance of the Huayi Chinese Festival of Arts 2011. In the same year, she held her three-night solo concert The Music Room at the Marina Bay Sands Grand Theater. Also in 2011, Chan worked with Nexus, Ministry of Defence as Creative Director for the Total Defence "Home – Keeping It Together" Campaign 2011. She was also executive producer for the remake of the Home MV, which featured 39 local artistes spanning different genres, eras and races, including Max Surin, Dick Lee, Taufik Batisah, JJ Lin, and Stefanie Sun. She wrote the theme song 倔强 for the MediaCorp Channel 8 anniversary drama Devotion, which won Best Drama Theme Song award at the 2012 Star Awards. Concerts themed An Enchanted Evening with Chiu Tsang Hei (傾城) were also held in Hong Kong.

In 2014, Chan performed in her first leading film role in Jason Lai's Miss J Contemplates Her Choice as the titular Miss J, who offers advice to callers on a radio talk show. The film premiered at the Singapore International Film Festival in December. In the same year, Chan reportedly underwent a surgical procedure that left her barely able to speak, though she eventually completed her "Spellbound" concert in 2015 at the Star Theatre.

In 2015, Chan competed in the China reality singing contest I Am A Singer. Eliminated in the first round, her participation drew mixed reviews, but paved the way for her entry to the China market with her signing to China’s Taihe Music Group. She announced her retirement from performing at the National Day Parades after making her last NDP performance. In the same year, she also sang the theme song for Channel 8 blockbuster The Dream Makers II.

In July 2016, she released her first album of original material in 12 years, titled The Edge of Paradise (天堂边缘). In September, Chan ended her "Spellbound" concert tour with a finale at Singapore Indoor Stadium to a 7,000-strong audience.

IN 2017, Chan returned to acting in Mediacorp Toggle web-series Patisserie Fighting as See Yu Tin.

In 2018, Chan marked her 25th anniversary as a singer with an acoustic live sessions album in which she also penned the lyrics for the title track “A Time for Everything”. She also staged “25 Years On: A Time For Everything” concerts in Singapore and Taipei.

In 2022, Chan performed in The LKY Musical as the late Madam Kwa Geok Choo, the wife of Singapore’s founding Prime Minister Lee Kuan Yew.

In 2023, Chan celebrated the 30th anniversary of her career with a three-night concert in Singapore titled Little Things.

In 2024, Chan performed in the musical adaption of Chinese animated film I Am What I Am.

In 2025, Chan sang the theme song for the TV series Emerald Hill - The Little Nyonya Story, "Echoes Of Petals". The song won her and its composer-producer Li Si Song the Best Original Song award at the Star Awards 2026.

In 2026, Chan held her "Atrium Live Tour" with solo concerts in various cities in China and her first show in Singapore in three years, on 19 September at the Singapore Indoor Stadium.

== Community involvement ==
In 1998, Chan was appointed as the first National Youth Ambassador for Singapore's National Youth Council. She served for two years. From 2001 to 2005, she served as a council member with the National Youth Council. In 2002 the Commonwealth Youth Programme Asia Centre awarded her an Award for Excellence in Youth Work.

In 2007, Chan was appointed to the board of the National Heritage Board over a two-year period, reaching out to the Singapore audience and linking with the creative industries.

She is also the ambassador to the Christian relief organization "World Vision".

== Business ventures ==
Chan has invested in two boutiques in Singapore, Flowers in the Attic and Roses in the Loft.

In 2010, Chan set up her own record label, named after her singing group Banshee Empire from when she was in secondary school.

== Personal life ==
It was reported that Chan married her long-time boyfriend in 2012 and divorced in 2017.

However, during an interview on The Assembly, aired on news network CNA in January 2025, Chan clarified that although she held a "wedding dinner", she was never legally married and hence, was never divorced.

== Discography ==
=== Studio albums ===
Title	Album details	Notes
Do Not Destroy the Harmony (不要傷了和气)	Released: 1993; Label: Formats:	Mandarin (Singapore release only)
Heartache (心痛)	Released: 1994; Label: Formats:	Mandarin (Taiwan debut album)
Cornered (逼得太紧)	Released: 1995; Label: Formats:	Mandarin
Sadness (伤心)	Released: 1996; Label: Formats:	Mandarin
Don't Let Me Hate You (别让我恨你)	Released: 1996; Label: Formats:	Mandarin
Revelation (揭晓)	Released: 1997; Label: Formats:	Cantonese
Dreams and Memories (有你愛过)	Released: 1998; Label: Formats:	Cantonese
Too Deep in the Act (入戏太深)	Released: 1998; Label: Formats:	Cantonese
Dazzling (炫耀)	Released: 1999; Label: Formats:	Mandarin
That Day, That Night 那天那夜	Released: 2000; Label: Formats:	Mandarin
Best 最好	Released: 2000; Label: Formats:	Cantonese
Lola 萝拉	Released: 2000; Label: Formats:	Mandarin
Numbness 麻醉	Released: 2001; Label: Formats:	Cantonese
Dreamscape 异想世界	Released: 2002; Label: Formats:	Mandarin
Understand 懂得	Released: 2003; Label: Formats:	Mandarin
East Toward Saturn 东弯土星	Released: 2004; Label: Formats:	Cantonese
Re-interpreting Kit Chan 重譯 陳潔儀	Released: 2011; Label: Formats:	
Re-interpreting Kit Chan (Version 2) 重譯 陳潔儀 . 重奏	Released: 2011; Label: Formats:	
The Edge of Paradise 天堂邊緣	Released: 2016; Label: Formats:	
A Time for Everything	Released: 2018; Label: Formats:	

=== Compilation albums ===
Title	Album details	
Like Kit (喜歡.潔儀.喜歡)	Released: 2002; Label: Formats:	Mandarin
Love Again (再愛一回 - 精選集)	Released: 2008; Label: Formats:	Mandarin / Cantonese
Kit Chan Selections (私房歌) (2CD)	Released: 2008; Label: Formats:	Mandarin / Cantonese
Kit Chan Selections (私房歌) (24K Gold Edition)	Released: 2009; Label: Formats:	Mandarin / Cantonese
Wait and Wait (等了又等)	Released: 2009; Label: Formats:	
Songs From The Heart (心頭歌)	Released: 2010; Label: Formats:	

=== Live albums ===
Title	Album details
"The Music Room” Concert Live Recording 想像空間 Live	Released: 2011; Label: Formats:
An Enchanted Evening with Kit Chan & Chiu Tsang Hei featuring the HKCITYPOPS 傾城 - 陳潔儀 X 趙增熹音樂會 Live	Released: 2012; Label: Formats:

=== Extended plays ===
Title	Album details
Wait (等)	Released: 2016; Label: Formats:
In Parallel (平行线)	Released: 2022; Label: Formats:

=== Singles ===
Title	Year	Album	Notes
"Home" (家)	1998	—	English / Mandarin
安	2023	—	Cantonese
愿爱鉴定	2023	—	Mandarin
"Home"	2023	—	English (25th Anniversary Remake)
"Echoes Of Petals" (落花如雨)	2024	—	Mandarin (Mediacorp drama Emerald Hill - The Little Nyonya Story theme song)
笑容	2024	—	Cantonese (Musical I Am What I Am 雄狮少年音乐剧)

== Concerts ==
Year	Title	Location
2001	That's Kit 就是陳潔儀	Singapore
2009	Join Love Club Concert 情牽女人心演唱會	Hong Kong
2011	My Musical Journey 我的音乐之旅	Singapore
2011	The Music Room 想像空间	Singapore
2012	An Enchanted Evening with Chiu Tsang Hei 傾城	Hong Kong
2015	Kit Chan Spellbound 著迷·陳潔儀	Hong Kong, Singapore, China
2018	Kit Chan 25 Years On：A Time For Everything	Singapore
2019	Kit Chan 25 Years： A Time For Everything	Taiwan
2019	MOOV Live Kit x Gin x Aga Love Encounter 網上行夢想系MOOV Live 陳潔儀 x 李幸倪 x 江海迦”	Hong Kong
2021	Reignite 'Live' in Concert	Singapore
2023	Little Things - Kit Chan 30th Anniversary Concert	Singapore

== Filmography ==
=== Film ===
Year	Title	Role	Notes	Ref.
1999	Eating Air	Mysterious Girl		
2010	Lover's Discourse	Mrs. Lai		
2014	Miss J Contemplates Her Choice	Miss J		

=== Television series ===
Year	Title	Role	Notes	Ref.
2000	Healing Hands II	Dorothy Yuen		
2004	Cash Is King	Huang Jin Hao		

=== Web series ===
Year	Title	Role	Notes	Ref.
2017	Patisserie Fighting	See Yu Tin	Mediacorp Toggle web-series	

=== Theatre ===
Year	Title	Role	Notes	Ref.
1997	Snow.Wolf.Lake	Ling Yuk-Fung	Cantonese	
1998	The Legend 漫步人生路	邓小君		
2002	East Meets West 千里情牽			
2002	Forbidden City: Portrait of an Empress	Yehanara / Empress Dowager		
2003	What's Love About? 愛情有什麼道理			
2003	Forbidden City: Portrait of an Empress	Yehanara / Empress Dowager		
2005	Snow.Wolf.Lake	Ling Yuk-Fung	Mandarin	
2006	Forbidden City: Portrait of an Empress	Yehanara / Empress Dowager		
2010	December Rains	Li Qing		
2017	Forbidden City: Portrait of an Empress	Yehanara / Empress Dowager		
2019	Matteo Ricci The Musical 利瑪竇音樂劇			
2020	Matteo Ricci The Musical 利瑪竇音樂劇			
2022	The LKY Musical 光燿建國路	Kwa Geok Choo		
2024	I Am What I Am	Xu Hui Zhen	Musical adaption of animated film	
2024	Matteo Ricci The Musical 利瑪竇音樂劇			

== Awards and nominations ==
Year	Award	Ref.
1996	RTHK 18th Top 10 Mandarin Hit Awards, Best Vocalist - Best Newcomer	
1997	8th Gold Awards, World Best Chinese Female Artiste	
1997	Hit Radio Pop Music Awards, Outstanding Female Artiste	
1997	8th Golden Melody Awards, World Best Chinese Female Artiste	
1998	TVB Pearl Channel Top 10 Hit Awards, Outstanding Performance (Gold)	
1998	Hit Radio Pop Music Awards, Outstanding Female Artiste	
1999	Her World Young Woman Achiever	
2000	Singapore Hit Awards, Best Local Artiste	
2000	COMPASS Award, Top Local Artiste of the Year	
2000	Hit Radio Awards 2000, Best Chinese Artiste Outside Hong Kong & Taiwan Territories	
2009	COMPASS Award, Artistic Excellence Award	
2011	Singapore Entertainment Awards, Outstanding Achievement Award – Music	
2012	Global Chinese Music Awards, Pop Music Outstanding Achievement Award	
2012	12th Chinese Music Media Awards, Best HIFI Artiste	
2015	QQ Music Awards, Special Achievement Award	
2015	Inaugural Voice of ELLE, Style Music Achievement Award of the Year	
2016	23rd Oriental Billboard Awards, Most Popular Artiste: Singapore Region & Best Asia Style Artiste	
2016	KU Music Asian Music Awards, Artiste of the Year	
2016	Inaugural Fresh Asia Music Awards, Media Recommended Artiste of the Year	
2017	Oriental Billboard Awards, Most Popular Artiste: Singapore Region & Influential Artist of the Year	

Organisation	Year	Category	Nominated work	Result	Ref
Singapore Hit Awards	1994	Media Recommendation—Best Newcomer		Won	
Singapore Hit Awards	1995	Best Local Artiste		Won	
Singapore Hit Awards	1999	Best Local Artiste		Won	
Singapore Hit Awards	2003	Decade of Outstanding Achievement Award		Won	
Star Awards	1998	Best Theme Song	Myths & Legends of Singapore	Nominated	
Star Awards	2000	Best Theme Song	My Home Affairs	Won	
Star Awards	2012	Best Theme Song	Devotion	Won	
Star Awards	2016	Best Theme Song	The Dream Makers II	Won	
Star Awards	2026	Best Theme Song	Emerald Hill - The Little Nyonya Story	Won	
