= Heart attack (disambiguation) =

Myocardial infarction, often known as heart attack is when the blood supply to a part of the heart is interrupted or stops.

Heart attack may also refer to:

- An inaccurate reference to cardiac arrest (sudden cardiac death)

== Film and television ==
- Heart Attack (1960 film), an Australian TV play
- Heart Attack (2014 film), an Indian film
- Heart Attack (2015 film), a Thai film
- "The Heart Attack", a 1991 episode of Seinfeld
- "The Heart Attack" (The Golden Girls), a 1985 television episode
- Heart Attack 2, Hindi title of the 2013 Indian Telugu-language film Gunde Jaari Gallanthayyinde
- Heart Attack 3, Hindi title of the 2012 Indian Kannada-language film Lucky

== Music ==
- Heart Attack (band), a New York hardcore band started in the early 1980s
- The Heart Attacks, a glam punk band from Atlanta, Georgia
- Heart Attack (EP), an extended play by AOA, along with the title track
- Heart Attack (Krokus album), 1988
- Heart Attack (Man Overboard album), and the title track, 2013
- Heartattack, a music magazine by Kent McClard

=== Songs ===
- "Heart Attack" (Demi Lovato song), 2013
- "Heart Attack" (Enrique Iglesias song), 2013
- "Heart Attack" (Noizy song), 2022
- "Heart Attack" (Olivia Newton-John song), 1982
- "Heart Attack" (Trey Songz song), 2012
- "Heart Attacks", by Alkaline Trio from Is This Thing Cursed?
- "Heart Attack", by the Asteroids Galaxy Tour from Out of Frequency
- "Heart Attack", by Beenie Man from Undisputed
- "Heart Attack", by Bronson featuring Lau.ra, from Bronson, 2020
- "Heart Attack", by Darren Hayes from Spin
- "Heart Attack", by the Eric Burdon Band from Power Company
- "Heart Attack", by Flight Facilities featuring Owl Eyes from Down to Earth, 2014
- "Heart Attack", by Grave Digger from Heavy Metal Breakdown
- "Heart Attack", by Loona from Chuu
- "Heart Attack", by Manafest from Fighter
- "Heart Attack", by One Direction from Take Me Home, 2012
- "Heart Attack", by Raven from Architect of Fear
- "Heart Attack", by Scarlxrd
- "Heart Attack", by Sleater-Kinney from Call the Doctor
- "Heart Attack", by Steve Walsh from Glossolalia
- "Heart Attack", by Sum 41 from All Killer No Filler
- "Heart Attack", by Thin Lizzy from Thunder and Lightning
- "Heart Attack", by Toxik from World Circus
- "Heart Attack", by Tune-Yards from I Can Feel You Creep Into My Private Life

== See also ==
- "This Heart Attack", a 2007 song by Faker
- Hard Attack (disambiguation)
