= Patisserie Fighting =

- 我的甜蜜革命
- Starring: Kit Chan; Chris Lee
- Country of origin: Singapore
- Original language: Chinese
- No. of episodes: 8

Production
- Production location: Singapore

Original release
- Network: Mediacorp Toggle
- Release: April 17, 2017

Patisserie Fighting (Chinese: 我的甜蜜革命) is a 2017 Singaporean web-drama series by Toggle. An eight-episode drama about baking, it stars Singaporean singer-actress Kit Chan and Taiwanese actor Chris Lee.

After more than a decade-long acting hiatus, this drama also marks Chan's first drama after the 2002's Cash Is King.

== Synopsis ==
See Yu Tin (Kit Chan), a biomedical researcher, quits her job of 20 years to fulfil her dream of being a pastry chef. One day, she chances upon a mystery pastry. Determined to discover the recipe, she tracks down the gifted yet reclusive pastry chef from Taiwan, Wu Wen Di or Hsiao D (Chris Lee), and asks to be his apprentice.

== Cast ==
- Kit Chan as See Yu Tin (施语恬)
- Chris Lee as Wu Wen Di (吴文迪) / Hsiao D (小 D)
