= Chris Lee Chih-cheng =

Taiwanese actor and model

Chris Lee
- Born: Lee Chih-cheng; November 11, 1981 (age 45); Keelung, Taiwan
- Education: Chung Yuan Christian University (BA); Hsing Wu University (MA)
- Occupations: Actor model

Chinese name
Transcriptions
Standard Mandarin
- Hanyu Pinyin: Lǐ Zhì Zhèng
Southern Min
- Hokkien POJ: Lí Chì-chèng

Chris Lee Chih-cheng (Chinese: 李至正; pinyin: Lǐ Zhì Zhèng; Pe̍h-ōe-jī: Lí Chì-chèng; born November 11, 1981) is a Taiwanese actor and model.

In 2004, he acted in Singapore's first action crime thriller film re:solve directed by Randy Ang.

== Filmography ==
=== Film ===
Year	English title	Original title	Role
2010	In Case of Love	街角的小王子	Chieh
2010	The Tempests of First Love	初戀風暴	
2014	re:solve	决义案	Chen Shaoqiang
2016	Sentence Me Guilty	判我有罪	Jiang Lihang
2016	10,000 Miles	一萬公里的約定	Ellie's boyfriend
2017	The Post Office Of Love	爱情邮局	

=== Television series ===
Year	English title	Original title	Role	Network
2006	The Graduate			PTS
2006	Mico, Go!	米可，GO！	Tien Yu-ming	PTS
2007		驚異傳奇 (第22單元: 巫毒娃娃)		StarTV
2009	Fighting Spirit	熱血青春		PTS
2010	Channel-X	國民英雄		TTV
2011	Sisters	姊妹		TTV
2011	Soldier	勇士們		TTV
2011	Inborn Pair	真愛找麻煩	Wang Ke-fan	SETTV
2012	Miss Rose	螺絲小姐要出嫁	Ah-zhe	TTV
2012	Dong-Huachun Barbershop	東華春理髮廳		TTV
2013	Second Life	幸福選擇題		SETTV
2016	Rock Records In Love	滾石愛情故事	Huang Chia-ta (episode 3)	PTS

=== Web series ===
Year	English title	Original title	Role	Network
2016	Trapped Minds	心魔	Derek	Mediacorp Toggle
2017	Patisserie Fighting	我的甜蜜革命		Mediacorp Toggle
