= Rhapsody in Blue (TV series) =

Singaporean Chinese TV drama

- 蓝色仙人掌
- Directed by: Li Ning Qiang
- Starring: Jesseca Liu; Christopher Lee; Guo Liang; Phyllis Quek; Eelyn Kok; Chen Hanwei
- Opening theme: 风铃 by Joi Chua
- Ending theme: 只因为你 by Nicholas Teo 左右为难 by Joi Chua

Original release
- Network: MediaCorp

Rhapsody In Blue (Simplified Chinese: 蓝色仙人掌) (Pinyin: lán sè xiān rén zhǎng, literally translated means "Blue Cactus" with "lán sè" meaning blue) is a Singaporean Chinese drama which is being telecast on Singapore's free-to-air channel, MediaCorp TV Channel 8 every weekday at 7 p.m. in June, 2006. The show stars Jesseca Liu, Christopher Lee, Guo Liang, Phyllis Quek, Eelyn Kok and Chen Hanwei.

== Cast ==
- Jesseca Liu as Ding Yirou
- Chen Hanwei as Guo Yongtao
- Christopher Lee as Lan Ziyuan
- Boon Hui Lu as Doudou
- Eelyn Kok as Zhao Cuiping
- Guo Liang as Ding Yixing
- Phyllis Quek as Alice
- Ong Ai Leng as Ya Er
- May Phua as Doudou's mother
- Zhu Houren as Ding Zhengda
- Hong Huifang as Guiying
- Zhang Zhenhuan as Hao Nan (Ep. 20)

== Story ==
24-year-old teacher Ding Yirou (Jesseca Liu) decides to marry 40-year-old divorcee Guo Yongtao (Chen Hanwei) despite vehement objections from her parents and disapproval from Yongtao's 11-year-old daughter Doudou (Boon Hui Lu). The stubborn and wilful girl runs away from home as a sign of protest and during the frantic search, Yongtao is killed instantly in a hit-and-run accident. Traumatised, Doudou loses her ability to speak. Yirou, out of guilt and love for Yongtao, decides to be Doudou's guardian and takes the child into her family home.

The entire Ding family is against the idea of the anti-social Doudou moving into the household. However, Doudou hates Yirou for causing her father's death and resents living with the ‘murderer’, thus deliberately causing chaos in the family.

Despite that, Yirou still takes on the role of a mother and brings Doudou for counselling, standing up to protect her when she is bullied at school and at home, even going great lengths to get Doudou transferred to the school where she teaches. Still, the girl is unmoved.

Cuiping (Eelyn Kok) and her boyfriend music therapist Ziyuan (Christopher Lee) are facing a crisis of their own: Cuiping had hit a man during a fight with Ziyuan in his car and had driven off in shaking fear when they realized the man is dead. The accident haunts Cuiping, escalating wildly when she discovers the deceased is her colleague Yirou's fiancé!

She has no courage to own up to the accident and so tries her best to be a better person to Yirou and Doudou to make up for it. Ziyuan also helps out by giving Doudou music therapy. Under his guidance and care, Doudou begins to open up about her hatred for Yirou. Ziyuan tries his best to let Doudou see the many things her guardian does for her behind her back.

Meanwhile, Alice (Phyllis Quek), Yixing's (Guo Liang) guileful wife, often disrespect and henpeck him. Yixing only find solace when he is with her secretary, Ya Er (Ong Ai Leng). When Alice stumbles upon the truth, she vents her frustrations on her maid, Timmi, with an iron. A scalded Timmi runs off to the police and Alice was arrested for maid abuse.

Yirou does not let up on trying to track down the driver who killed Yongtao. Her determination causes Cuiping such panic that the latter develops a mental disorder and turns suicidal.

On the other hand, Ziyuan has been giving Yirou a lot of moral, spiritual and physical support and both begin to develop affections for each other. Nevertheless, both withhold their feelings out of guilt and obligations to Yongtao and Cuiping respectively.

Meanwhile, Doudou's estranged mother (May Phua) has arrived from the United States. Decides to take her to the States with her and to start a life anew with her mum and a new stepfather. Unfortunately, this pressures Doudou to stay with Yirou instead, while Ziyuan ends up in prison and finally Doudou forgives him.

Alice was about to leave, but is prevented by her mother-in-law who tries her best to console her and to reconcile with Yixing.

== Awards and nominations ==
Rhapsody In Blue has been nominated for four awards at Star Awards 2006. However, only Boon Hui Lu (Doudou) managed to bag an award. The other dramas that are nominated are The Shining Star (星闪闪), C.I.D. (刑警2人组), Love at 0 °C (爱情零度C), and Measure of Man (大男人，小男人).

Awards
Award	Category	Recipients (if any)	Result
Star Awards 2006 Part 1 红星大奖 上半场	Young Talent Award 青平果奖	Boon Hui Lu 文慧如	Won
Star Awards 2006 Part 1 红星大奖 上半场	Best Theme Song 最佳主题曲	Joi Chua 蔡淳佳	Nominated
Star Awards 2006 Part 2 红星大奖 下半场	Best Actress 最佳女主角	Jesseca Liu 刘子绚	Nominated
Star Awards 2006 Part 2 红星大奖 下半场	Best Drama Serial 最佳电视剧	—N/a	Nominated

== Trivia ==
- The opening theme 风铃 was adapted from Punch's single Ying Gwah Sia Jai.
- The name of the show is based on the famous Jazz ballad, "Rhapsody in Blue".

== See also ==
- List of MediaCorp Chinese series (2006)
