= Yu-Gi-Oh! Duel Monsters =

Japanese anime television series

- Cover of the first DVD volume, featuring the protagonist Yugi Mutou in the foreground and the Duelist Kingdom arc's antagonist, Maximillion Pegasus (Pegasus J. Crawford) in the background
- 遊☆戯☆王デュエルモンスターズ
- Genre: Adventure; Fantasy; Science fiction
- Based on: Yu-Gi-Oh! by Kazuki Takahashi and Studio Dice
- Developed by: Junki Takegami (#1–121); Atsushi Maekawa (#122–144); Shin Yoshida (#145–184, #199–224); Akemi Omode (#185–198)
- Directed by: Kunihisa Sugishima
- Music by: Shinkichi Mitsumune
- Country of origin: Japan
- No. of episodes: 224 (list of episodes)

Production
- Producers: Hidetaka Ikuta; Naoki Sasada; Noriko Kobayashi
- Animator: Studio Gallop
- Production companies: TV Tokyo; NAS

Original release
- Network: TXN (TV Tokyo)
- Release: April 18, 2000 – September 29, 2004

Related
- Anime television series

Yu-Gi-Oh! Capsule Monsters
- Studio: Gallop
- Licensed by: NA: 4Kids Entertainment (2006–2012); Konami Cross Media NY (2012–present)
- Original network: AU: 9Go!; US: Fox (4Kids TV); ZA: SABC South Africa, SABC 1, SABC 2, SABC 3
- Original run: September 9, 2006 – November 25, 2006
- Episodes: 12
- Anime films
- The Movie; Yu-Gi-Oh! Bonds Beyond Time; Yu-Gi-Oh! The Dark Side of Dimensions
- Other series
- List of all Yu-Gi-Oh! series; Yu-Gi-Oh! R
- Other media
- Video games; Trading card game

Yu-Gi-Oh!, known in Japan as Yu-Gi-Oh! Duel Monsters (Japanese: 遊☆戯☆王デュエルモンスターズ, Hepburn: Yū Gi Ō Dyueru Monsutāzu) and alternatively subtitled Rulers of the Duel in the United States and Canada, is a Japanese anime series animated by Studio Gallop based on the Yu-Gi-Oh! manga series written by Kazuki Takahashi. It is the second anime adaptation of the manga following the 1998 anime television series produced by Toei Animation. The series revolves around a young high school boy named Yugi Muto who battles opponents in the Duel Monsters card game. The series begins from chapter 60 in volume 7 before loosely adapting the remaining chapters of the original manga by making story changes that conflict with the events of the manga canon.

Yu-Gi-Oh! Duel Monsters originally aired in Japan on TV Tokyo from April 2000 to September 2004, running for 224 episodes. A remastered version, highlighting certain duels, began airing in Japan in February 2015. An English-language localization of the anime series was produced by 4Kids Entertainment, and aired in the United States from September 29, 2001, to June 10, 2006, on Kids' WB. Twelve extra episodes, which are American-produced, aired exclusively for the Western audience in mid-late 2006 shortly after the conclusion of the main series.

The series has since spawned its own metaseries. Duel Monsters would be succeeded by Yu-Gi-Oh! GX, Yu-Gi-Oh! 5D's, Yu-Gi-Oh! Zexal, Yu-Gi-Oh! Arc-V, Yu-Gi-Oh! VRAINS, Yu-Gi-Oh! Sevens, and Yu-Gi-Oh! Go Rush!!. Three films based on this anime series have also been produced: Pyramid of Light (2004), Bonds Beyond Time (2010) and The Dark Side of Dimensions (2016).

== Plot overview ==
=== Season 1 ===
The story follows Yugi Muto, a boy who completed an ancient Egyptian artifact known as the Millennium Puzzle, which led him to inherit an alter-ego spirit. After defeating his rival, Seto Kaiba, in a game of Duel Monsters, Yugi is approached by Maximillion Pegasus, the creator of Duel Monsters, who uses the power of another Millennium Item, the Millennium Eye, to kidnap the soul of Yugi's grandfather. Joined by his friends Joey Wheeler (Katsuya Jonouchi in the English manga and in Japanese versions), Tristan Taylor (Hiroto Honda), and Téa Gardner (Anzu Mazaki), Yugi enters Pegasus' Duelist Kingdom tournament in order to defeat Pegasus and free his grandfather's soul.

=== Season 2 ===
Yugi learns that the spirit dwelling within him is a nameless Pharaoh from ancient Egyptian times, who does not remember anything of his past. Yugi enters Kaiba's Battle City tournament in order to obtain the three Egyptian God cards needed to unveil the Pharaoh's past. Along the way, Yugi encounters more Millennium Item wielders, including Marik Ishtar, the wielder of the Millennium Rod, and his elder sister Ishizu Ishtar who possesses the prophesying Millennium Necklace.

=== Season 3 ===
The first twenty-four episodes of the season form an original story arc that sees Yugi and his friends get sucked into a virtual world run by Noah, the son of Seto and Mokuba's adoptive father, Gozaburo. After returning to the real world, the finals of the Battle City tournament commence.

=== Season 4 ===
Produced during the time Millennium World was being written, in a new, original story arc, the Orichalcos drains the power from the Egyptian God cards and begins gathering souls in order to revive the ancient dragon monster serpent, Leviathan. Yugi, Joey and Kaiba are each given a legendary dragon card to fight the Orichalcos, its leader, Dartz, and his henchmen.

=== Season 5 ===
The final season is equivalent to Millennium World in the manga. However, the first half focuses on anime-original story arcs released during the time the final chapters of the manga were being written.

After the Orichalcos has been eliminated, in another original story arc, Yugi and his friends battle in the KaibaCorp Grand Championship to face off another of Kaiba's rivals, Zigfried. Then, Yugi, his friends, and Solomon travel to India only to be taken to the world of Capsule Monsters.

The latter half of the season sees Ryo Bakura, the owner of the Millennium Ring, overcome by the dark spirit within the Ring. When Yugi and his friends go to Egypt, they find themselves sucked 5,000 years into the past, where the Pharaoh must battle Bakura and his evil essence, Zorc the Dark One. After returning to the present day, Yugi and the Pharaoh duel each other in the ultimate test.

== Localization ==
The English Yu-Gi-Oh! logo

In April 2001, 4Kids Entertainment obtained the merchandising and television rights to the series from Nihon Ad Systems. In its adaptation, character names, settings, and other aspects were changed. The show's visuals and sound effects were replaced, and a new music score was used. In addition to explaining these changes, 4Kids' senior vice president of digital media, Mark Kirk, also explained during an interview with Anime News Network that U.S. television broadcast laws under the FCC dictated that the "Duel Monster" cards in the anime were not allowed to look exactly like the real cards that are sold; otherwise, the show would legally be considered an infomercial rather than an animated television series, and thus the cost to air it during daytime hours would become exponentially higher.

An album containing some tracks from the English dub music entitled Yu-Gi-Oh! Music to Duel By was released on October 29, 2002, on DreamWorks Records on Audio CD and Compact Cassette.

An uncut version, featuring an all-new English dub track and the original Japanese audio, began release in October 2004, in association with Funimation Entertainment. Only three volumes, comprising the first nine episodes, were ever released. 4Kids would later release the uncut Japanese episodes on YouTube in March 2009, but were forced to stop in August of that same year, due to rights issues.

On March 24, 2011, TV Tokyo and Nihon Ad Systems, owner of the anime series, filed a joint lawsuit against 4Kids, accusing the company of underpayments concerning the Yu-Gi-Oh! franchises and allegedly conspiring with Funimation, and have allegedly terminated their licensing deal with them. This led to 4Kids filing for protection under Chapter 11 of the U.S. Bankruptcy code. Although 4Kids had managed to settle the case in March 2012, they ended up selling their rights to the franchise, among other assets, to Konami. Konami currently distributes the series and its spin-offs, in addition to producing English dubs through its subsidiary, Konami Cross Media NY.

=== Streaming ===
In July 2009, 4Kids announced plans to release the original, Japanese version of the anime series with subtitles on their YouTube channel. However, in August 2009, these episodes were removed due to legal issues with ADK (NAS' parent company and owner of the anime) and Shunsuke Kazama, the Japanese voice of Yugi. On July 11, 2015, the Japanese version of the series began streaming on Crunchyroll. The news came over a week after an earlier announcement that streaming of subtitled episodes of Yu-Gi-Oh! GX would begin on August 1, 2015.

== Cast ==
Major cast
Role	Japanese		English		
Role	Japanese		4Kids Entertainment (2001–2006)		Voiceovers Unlimited (2001–2002)
Yugi Muto/ Yami Yugi	Shunsuke Kazama	Shunsuke Kazama	Jay Snyder	Jay Snyder	Chuck Powers
Katsuya Jonouchi	Hiroki Takahashi	Hiroki Takahashi	Joey Wheeler		
Katsuya Jonouchi	Hiroki Takahashi	Hiroki Takahashi	Vinnie Penna	Vinnie Penna	Dwayne Tan
Anzu Mazaki	Maki Saitou	Maki Saitou	Téa Gardner		
Anzu Mazaki	Maki Saitou	Maki Saitou	Amy Birnbaum	Amy Birnbaum	Alison Lester
Hiroto Honda	1–51	Takayuki Kondou	Tristan Taylor		
Hiroto Honda	1–51	Takayuki Kondou	1–10	Sam Riegel	Brian Zimmerman
Hiroto Honda	52–224	Hidehiro Kikuchi	11–224; uncut	Greg Abbey	Brian Zimmerman
Seto Kaiba	Kenjirou Tsuda	Kenjirou Tsuda	Eric Stuart	Eric Stuart	Christian Lee
Mokuba Kaiba	Junko Takeuchi	Junko Takeuchi	1–184	Tara Sands	Christian Lee
Mokuba Kaiba	Junko Takeuchi	Junko Takeuchi	185–224	Carrie Keranen	Christian Lee
Ryo Bakura/ Yami Bakura	1–40	You Inoue	Ted Lewis	Ted Lewis	Chuck Powers
Ryo Bakura/ Yami Bakura	41–224	Rica Matsumoto	Ted Lewis	Ted Lewis	Chuck Powers
Suguroku Mutou	Tadashi Miyazawa	Tadashi Miyazawa	Solomon Muto		
Suguroku Mutou	Tadashi Miyazawa	Tadashi Miyazawa	Maddie Blaustein	Maddie Blaustein	Chuck Powers
Pegasus J. Crawford	Jirou Jay Takasugi	Jirou Jay Takasugi	Maximillion Pegasus		
Pegasus J. Crawford	Jirou Jay Takasugi	Jirou Jay Takasugi	Darren Dunstan	Darren Dunstan	Brian Zimmerman
Mai Kujaku	Haruhi Nanao	Haruhi Nanao	Mai Valentine		
Mai Kujaku	Haruhi Nanao	Haruhi Nanao	1–144	Megan Hollingshead	Alison Lester
Mai Kujaku	Haruhi Nanao	Haruhi Nanao	145–224	Erica Schroeder	Alison Lester
Mai Kujaku	Haruhi Nanao	Haruhi Nanao	uncut	Kathleen Delaney	Alison Lester
Shizuka Kawai	Mika Sakenobe	Mika Sakenobe	Serenity Wheeler		
Shizuka Kawai	Mika Sakenobe	Mika Sakenobe	Lisa Ortiz	Lisa Ortiz	Alison Lester
Dinosaur Ryuzaki	2–59	Kin Fujii	Rex Raptor		
Dinosaur Ryuzaki	2–59	Kin Fujii	1–144	Sam Riegel	Brian Zimmerman Christian Lee
Dinosaur Ryuzaki	131–224	Yuichi Nakamura	145–184	Sebastian Arcelus	Brian Zimmerman Christian Lee
Dinosaur Ryuzaki	131–224	Yuichi Nakamura	185–224	Tony Salerno	Brian Zimmerman Christian Lee
Insector Haga	Urara Takano	Urara Takano	Weevil Underwood		
Insector Haga	Urara Takano	Urara Takano	James Carter Cathcart	James Carter Cathcart	Brian Zimmerman
Ryota Kajiki	Daisuke Namikawa	Daisuke Namikawa	Mako Tsunami		
Ryota Kajiki	Daisuke Namikawa	Daisuke Namikawa	Andrew Rannells	Andrew Rannells	Dwayne Tan
"Bandit" Keith Howard	Hajime Komada	Hajime Komada	Ted Lewis	Ted Lewis	Brian Zimmerman Christian Lee
Shadi	Nozomu Sasaki	Nozomu Sasaki	Vinnie Penna	Vinnie Penna	Brian Zimmerman Chuck Powers
Rebecca Hawkins	Kaori Tagami	Kaori Tagami	Kerry Williams	Kerry Williams	Alison Lester
Arthur Hawkins	Saburou Kodaka	Saburou Kodaka	Mike Pollock	Mike Pollock	Chuck Powers
Ryuji Otogi	Ryou Naitou	Ryou Naitou	Duke Devlin		
Ryuji Otogi	Ryou Naitou	Ryou Naitou	Marc Thompson	Marc Thompson	
Ishizu Ishtar	Sumi Shimamoto	Sumi Shimamoto	Nell Balaban	Nell Balaban	Alison Lester
Marik Ishtar	Tetsuya Iwanaga	Tetsuya Iwanaga	Jonathan Todd Ross	Jonathan Todd Ross	Christian Lee
Rishid Ishtar	Konta	Konta	Odion Ishtar		
Rishid Ishtar	Konta	Konta	J. David Brimmer	J. David Brimmer	Brian Zimmerman
Noa Kaiba	Chisa Yokoyama	Chisa Yokoyama	Noah Kaiba		
Noa Kaiba	Chisa Yokoyama	Chisa Yokoyama	Andrew Rannells	Andrew Rannells	Taaz Gill
Gozaburo Kaiba	Tetsuo Komura	Tetsuo Komura	98–184	Richard Will	Chuck Powers
Gozaburo Kaiba	Tetsuo Komura	Tetsuo Komura	185–224	Ted Lewis	Chuck Powers
Saruwatari	Masahiro Okazaki	Masahiro Okazaki	Kemo		
Saruwatari	Masahiro Okazaki	Masahiro Okazaki	Eric Stuart	Eric Stuart	Brian Zimmerman
Isono	Masami Iwasaki	Masami Iwasaki	Roland		
Isono	Masami Iwasaki	Masami Iwasaki	1–127; 149–224	David Wills	Brian Zimmerman Chuck Powers
Isono	Masami Iwasaki	Masami Iwasaki	128–148	Vinnie Penna	Brian Zimmerman Chuck Powers
Dartz	Yuu Emao	Yuu Emao	Vinnie Penna	Vinnie Penna	
