= Till the End (TV series) =

2023 Singaporean television series

- Promotional poster
- Traditional Chinese: 陪你到最後
- Simplified Chinese: 陪你到最后
- Literal meaning: "With You Til the End"
- Hanyu Pinyin: Péi nǐ dào zuì hòu
- Genre: Supernatural; Romantic comedy; Drama
- Screenplay by: Ang Siew Hoong
- Story by: Ang Siew Hoong
- Directed by: Kok Tzyy Haw
- Starring: Boon Hui Lu; Richie Koh; Romeo Tan; Kym Ng; Bonnie Loo; Zhu Houren; Ryan Lian
- Opening theme: "Péi dào zuì hòu 陪到最后" by Boon Hui Lu
- Ending theme: "Shì bù shì wǒ bù gòu hǎo 是不是我不够好" by Yo Lee
- Country of origin: Singapore
- Original language: Mandarin
- No. of seasons: 1
- No. of episodes: 20

Production
- Executive producer: Jasmine Woo
- Cinematography: Hong Shunmei; Peng Jinchen
- Editor: Huang Yuping
- Running time: 45 minutes
- Production company: Mediacorp

Original release
- Network: Channel 8
- Release: 30 October – 24 November 2023

Till the End (Chinese: 陪你到最后) is a 2023 Singaporean romantic comedy drama series starring Boon Hui Lu, Richie Koh, Romeo Tan, Kym Ng, Bonnie Loo, Zhu Houren and Ryan Lian. The series revolves around the lives of undertakers and the subject of death and separation. It airs on weeknights 9pm on Mediacorp Channel 8 from 30 October 2023.

== Cast ==
- Boon Hui Lu as Lin Huiqi
  - Charlotte Yue as young Lin Huiqi
- Richie Koh as Peng You
  - Zhou Jiele as young Peng You
- Romeo Tan as Sun Haoming
- Kym Ng as Yang Kehua
- Bonnie Loo as Lu Zixuan
- Zhu Houren as Li Zhiyin
- Ryan Lian as Chen Xiaolong
- Priscelia Chan as Fan Youqing
- Bernard Tan as Peng Tiancheng
- Zhu Xiufeng as Cuifang
- Rayson Tan as Xie Weiye
- Belle Chua as Tracy

== Production ==
Filming began on 2 May 2023 and was scheduled to last till August 2023. Kym Ng, who played a ghost character for the first time in her career, suffered a fall and broke her wrist while filming a possession scene with Boon Hui Lu, who played her daughter in the series. Ng was given five weeks of medical leave and resumed filming in early July 2023.

== Marketing ==
In October 2023, it was reported that there would only be telephone interviews to promote Till the End, deviating from Mediacorp's usual practice of holding a media press conference for every Channel 8 local prime time dramas. The television station did not specify a reason for the change.

== Accolades ==
Organisation	Year	Category	Nominees	Result	Ref
Star Awards	2024	Best Director	Kok Tzyy Haw	Nominated	
Star Awards	2024	Best Screenplay	Ang Siew Hoong	Nominated	
Star Awards	2024	Best Theme Song	"Pei Dao Zuihou" by Boon Hui Lu	Nominated	
Star Awards	2024	Best Drama Serial	—N/a	Nominated	
Star Awards	2024	Best Supporting Actor	Zhu Hou Ren	Nominated	
Star Awards	2024	Best Actress	Kym Ng	Won	
Star Awards	2024	MY PICK Favourite CP	Richie Koh & Boon Hui Lu	Nominated	
