= Dwayne Tan =

Singaporean actor

- Occupations: Actor; singer

Dwayne Tan is a Singaporean actor and singer.

== Biography ==
Tan graduated from the American Musical and Dramatic Academy in New York. He began his training at the Singapore Armed Forces Music and Drama Company (SAF MDC). He is also a Singapore Repertory Theatre Young Company (SRT YC) alumnus and a member of the Association of Singapore Actors.

He began acting in Singapore with Theatreworks' musical, Beauty World and has worked with many other theatre companies.

His work occasionally extends into TV and radio. Tan was one of the top 30 contestants in the 1st season of Singapore Idol. Tan has also lent his voice to many characters in cartoons like One Piece, the second Yu-Gi-Oh! anime series (Yu-Gi-Oh! Duel Monsters), and Machine Robo Rescue. For 5 years, he hosted the Sunday morning show on the arts radio station Passion 99.5FM.

He became a finalist on Singapore Idol; due to this he produced his Moments Alone, an EP.

He also released his novel, "My Cup of Teh-O: A Singaporean Boy's Search for Home in America", which is a narrative loosely based on his life in New York City. On his official website, there are links to sample chapters of his work.

On film, Tan has appeared in Cyber Wars (starring Joan Chen) and was involved in a scene as a New York tourist with Susan Sarandon, in Disney's Enchanted.

Tan has been trained in puppeteering.

== Voice acting credits ==
(For Singaporean dubs only)

- Joey Wheeler (Katsuya Jonouchi) in Yu-Gi-Oh!.
- Mr. 2, Mr. 3, Dalton and Portgas D. Ace in One Piece
- Katsutoshi Hayashibara in Zipang
- Makoto Fujitani in Karin (American dub)
- Dylan Yuki, Sasuke, Peter, Jirou, Shirou, Chai, Mr. Tsuchida and Otome in Mirmo!
- Ace, Jay, Ken, Sasaki, SubmarineRobo and GyroRobo in Machine Robo Rescue
- Noda in Gokusen
- Satoshi Horio in The Prince of Tennis
- Kodoh Kuraki, Teruma Kamioka [Crash B-Daman]

== Television acting credits ==
- Singapore Shakes
- Incredible Tales – Banana Tree Spirit
- Behind Closed Doors – Toy Boys
- Sunshine Station
- Heartland Hubby
- HBO's Serangoon Road

== Performance credits ==
- Junie B. Jones US National Tour 2007
- Magicbox
- Much Ado About Nothing
- Romeo and Juliet
- Army Daze

== Musical credits ==
- Thoroughly Modern Millie
- Beauty World
- Snow White and the Seven Dwarfs
- Pinocchio
- Spring Awakening
