= Hard Attack =

Hard Attack or hard attack may refer to:

- Hard Attack (Sirius XM), a radio channel now called Liquid Metal
- Hard Attack (Dust album), 1972
- Hard Attack (MX-80 album), 1977
- Hard attack, a phonetic feature
