= Workplace safety and health in Singapore =

The Singapore Ministry of Manpower is the responsible authority for occupational safety and health in Singapore. The Workplace Safety and Health Act (WSH) 2006 addresses requirements for safety and health in workplaces in Singapore and replaced the Factories Act as of 1 March 2006. The Workplace Safety and Health Council is an industry-led Statutory Body that was formed on 1 April 2008.
