= Incredible Tales =

Supernatural horror documentary series in Singapore

- Also known as: I.T. 信不信有你 (Chinese season 1) 灵异怪谈 (Chinese season 2-present)
- Genre: Supernatural Horror; Documentary
- Starring: Utt Panichkul
- Country of origin: Singapore
- Original languages: English; Chinese
- No. of seasons: 8
- No. of episodes: 104

Production
- Production location: Singapore
- Camera setup: Multiple-camera setup
- Running time: 22 minutes (approx.)

Original release
- Network: Mediacorp Channel 5 Mediacorp Channel 8 TV3 (Malaysian TV network)
- Release: 2004 – 12 August 2017

Incredible Tales (I.T.) is a 2004 Singaporean anthology supernatural horror documentary television series released by MediaCorp. The series primarily revolves around supernatural stories set in Southeast Asia and is hosted by Thai actor and model Utt Panichkul, or simply known as Utt during the episodes.

A total of eight seasons were broadcast with the recent season airing on 13 May 2017 and ending on 12 August 2017. A Mandarin dubbed series (Chinese: 灵异怪谈; pinyin: Língyì guàitán; Season 1 as Chinese: 信不信有你; pinyin: Xìn bùxìn yǒu nǐ) was also aired after the English version. As of 2019, all eight seasons (as well as the Mandarin dubbed series) were archived in MediaCorp's video on demand website meWATCH.

== Premise ==
The series features the stories of paranormal encounters by ordinary people in Singapore, inspired by actual encounters submitted directly to the show by viewers, intriguing urban legends with uncertain origins, and published materials by prolific best-selling authors such as Russell Lee (best known for True Singapore Ghost Story) and Goh Sin Tub.

Each half-hour episode features a story or two on the recount of paranormal occurrences in Asia, though the episodes aired that revolve around this episode are reenactment, similar to the other horror anthologies such as Tales from the Crypt and Are You Afraid of the Dark?.

The fifth season marked the first season to air in High-definition television, using a revamped theme tune while the title logo of IT was redesigned to look more transparent from white, and the show's title, Incredible Tales were placed on the bottom left for the first time together. Additionally, filming took place in Philippines for the first time.

== Series overview ==
Season	Episodes	Originally aired	
Season	Episodes	First aired	Last aired
1	13	2004	2004
2	13	2005	2005
3	13	2006	2006
4	13	2007	2007
5	13	2008	2008
6	13	2010	2010
7	13	31 August 2013	30 November 2013
8	13	13 May 2017	12 August 2017
