= Heartache (Kit Chan album) =

心痛 (Heartache)

Studio album by Kit Chan
- Released: November 18, 1994
- Genre: C-Pop
- Label: 立得唱片; Cinepoly Records; PolyGram; Ocean Butterflies
- Producer: Billy Koh

Kit Chan chronology
| 不要傷了和氣 Do Not Destroy The Harmony (1993) | 心痛 (Heartache) (1994) | 逼得太緊 Push Too Far (1995) |

Heartache (Chinese: 心痛; pinyin: Xin Tong) is Singaporean singer Kit Chan's first album in Taiwan. It consists of 10 tracks, of which six are from her debut album, Do Not Destroy The Harmony.

== Track listing ==
| No. | Title | Length |
|---|---|---|
| 1. | "Heartache" (心痛 Xin Tong) |
| 2. | "Quarreled" (傷了和氣 Shang Le He Qi) |
| 3. | "Love let me make mistakes" (愛讓我犯錯 Ai Rang Wo Fan Cuo) |
| 4. | "Somewhere" |
| 5. | "You in Deep Sleep" (沉睡中的你 Chen Sui Zhong De Ni) |
| 6. | "No" (不要 Bu Yao) |
| 7. | "Soar with Me" (帶我飛 Dai Wo Fei) |
| 8. | "Dinosaur Class" (恐龍族 Kong Long Zu) |
| 9. | "All said in the Dream" (都說在夢裡 Dou Shui Zai Meng Li) |
| 10. | "Walk out of the Darkness, My Friend" (走出黑暗的世界吧!朋友 Zou Chu Hei An De Shi Jie Ba Peng You) |
