= Cash is King (TV series) =

- 勝券在握
- Genre: Dramedy
- Written by: Ella Chan
- Starring: Chin Han; Michelle Yim; Kit Chan; Darren Lim; Adam Chen; Xia Chuan
- Opening theme: 握住我的手 by Liang Wern Fook, sung by Kit Chan
- Countries of origin: Singapore; Hong Kong
- Original language: Chinese
- No. of episodes: 40

Production
- Running time: approx. 45 minutes

Original release
- Network: Channel U (Singapore) aTV (Hong Kong)
- Release: 2004

Cash is King (勝券在握) is a 40-episode drama produced by Hong Kong (aTV) and Singapore (SPH MediaWorks). It was completely filmed in Singapore and aired in 2002. The series title refers to the term "cash is king" and the story centers on how the characters are each affected by stock market crisis, most likely a reference to the financial aftermath of the September 11 attacks.

The series was re-run in 2007, and again in early 2010 on Mediacorp Channel 8.

== Synopsis ==
Is cash really king? The plot revolves around the Qi family, the Tao family and those associated with them. As each of them go through life, they discover in their own way that wealth does not equate true happiness.

== Cast ==
=== Qi family ===
Actor	Character	Description
Ong Xiu Ping	Xian Yanzhu 冼燕珠	齊仁之繼母 齊孝，齊來之母 齊光輝之祖母
Chin Han	Qi Ren 齐仁	前電視主持人 洗燕珠之繼子 齊光輝之父 梁冰冰之前夫 黃金好之男友
Michelle Yim	Liang Bingbing 梁冰冰	齊仁之前妻 齊光輝之母 曾背叛齊仁，與飛機師Albert離開; Albert之妻，後Albert離世; Alfred之女友
Darren Lim	Qi Xiao 齐孝	同性戀 洗燕珠之子 暗戀好友Morgan
Bryan Wong	Qi Lai 齐莱	患有自閉症 洗燕珠之子
Zhu Jun'en (younger)	Qi Guanghui 齐光辉	齊仁梁冰冰之子 後為丁小一之男友
Adam Chen (older)	Qi Guanghui 齐光辉	齊仁梁冰冰之子 後為丁小一之男友

=== Tao family ===
Actor	Character	Description
Xia Chuan	Tao Dafu 陶大富	C陶安，陶思思，黃金好之父 黃分之舊情人
Ix Shen	Tao An 陶安	陶大富之子
Wallis Pang	Tao Sisi 陶思思	陶安之妹; Jason之前女友; Duncan之妻，後反目，後和好
Wang Yuqing	Peter Shen 沈彼得	陶大富之女婿

=== Other characters ===
Actor	Character	Description
Kit Chan	Huang Jinhao 黃金好	齊仁之女友 黃芬之女
Tammy Chow	Huang Fen 黃芬	陶大富之情婦 黃金好之母
Marco Lo Hing-Fai	Deng Shiqin 邓世勤	陶思思之夫，後反目，後和好 與蘇美卿搞婚外情，後蘇美卿懷孕
Cecilia Lai	Su Meiqing 苏美卿	鄧世勤之初戀情人兼情婦，後為鄧世勤產下一名女兒後離世
Shirley Yee	Qiu Xiaoling 邱少玲	Stockbroker
Chan Fu Ning	Tang Guosen 唐国森	Economics graduate from Harvard University 陶思思之前男友
Jeanette Aw	Ding Xiaoyi 丁小一	財經記者 齊光輝之女友
Erica Lee	Gao Meijun 高美君	黃金好之老師
Dai Chin-Kwok	Mo Taijin 莫泰瑾	A dentist
Zhang Xinxiang		
